= A Trip to the Dentist =

- Veronica Mars episode
- Veronica (Kristen Bell) finds the hidden cameras in the Echolls' pool house.
- Episode no.: Season 1 Episode 21
- Directed by: Marcos Siega
- Written by: Diane Ruggiero
- Production code: 2T5720
- Original air date: May 3, 2005

Guest appearances
- Jonathan Bennett as Casey Gant; Alona Tal as Meg Manning; Corinne Bohrer as Lianne Mars; Lisa Thornhill as Celeste Kane; Amanda Noret as Madison Sinclair; Christopher B. Duncan as Clarence Wiedman; Sam Huntington as Luke; Kevin Sheridan as Sean Friedrich; Erica Gimpel as Alicia Fennel; Leighton Meester as Carrie Bishop; Kyle Gallner as Cassidy Casablancas; Ryan Hansen as Dick Casablancas; Daniel Bess as Cole; Jennifer Gareis as Deborah Collins; Harry Hamlin as Aaron Echolls

Episode chronology
| ← Previous "M.A.D." | Next → "Leave It to Beaver" |
- Veronica Mars season 1

"A Trip to the Dentist" is the twenty-first and penultimate episode of the first season of the American mystery television series Veronica Mars. Written by Diane Ruggiero and directed by Marcos Siega, the episode premiered on UPN on May 3, 2005.

The series depicts the adventures of Veronica Mars (Kristen Bell) as she deals with life as a high school student while moonlighting as a private detective. In this episode, Veronica resolves the mystery of her sexual assault a year earlier by talking to previous acquaintances and learning about the details of what happened at Shelly Pomroy's party a year earlier while she was under the influence of GHB. Meanwhile, Duncan (Teddy Dunn) returns from running away earlier, and Veronica and Logan's relationship matures as she reacts to the news that he had roofies the night of the party.

The episode, which resolved Veronica's date rape, one of the main story arcs of the first season, was critically acclaimed.

== Background ==
Although the first season primarily deals with the murder of Veronica's best friend, Lilly Kane (Amanda Seyfried), and the murder is resolved in "Leave It to Beaver", another arc running throughout the season is the story of Veronica's mysterious rape a year earlier. At that time, Veronica went to a party at a wealthy student, Shelly's, house. There, she was slipped a mysterious drink, and the next thing she knew, she woke up in an unidentified bed missing her underwear, indicating that she had been raped. The next day, she walked into the sheriff's department and reported the crime, where Sheriff Don Lamb (Michael Muhney) mocked her predicament and refused to conduct an investigation, leaving Veronica in tears.

== Synopsis ==
The episode opens in Havana, Cuba. Keith (Enrico Colantoni) surprises a now-bearded Duncan (Teddy Dunn), who denies killing Lilly (Amanda Seyfried). At school, Veronica avoids Logan, but that night, Logan shows up at Veronica's door. Logan apologizes for owning GHB before Veronica informs him about her rape. Logan denies being her rapist, but Veronica says she'll punish whoever it is, even if it's Logan. Veronica talks to Meg (Alona Tal) about the party, and she mentions seeing Veronica being harassed by some boys before she left. Keith returns Duncan to the Kanes before threatening Clarence Wiedman (Christopher B. Duncan). Veronica approaches Luke (Sam Huntington) about a trip to Tijuana to pick up some GHB; he admits getting the drugs, but he says that he gave them to Dick Casablancas (Ryan Hansen). Luke states that Madison Sinclair was seen writing "slut" on Veronica's car after the party. Veronica confronts Madison, who says that she defaced Veronica's car because she made out with Dick, her boyfriend. However, Veronica doesn't remember this incident due to the effects of the drugs. Veronica attempts to barge in on a fight between Keith and Alicia over Wallace's involvement in the Wiedman case, but her intervention does nothing to defuse the situation. Veronica talks to Casey, who confirms the make out sessions with Dick and Cassidy and tells her that Veronica was also forced to make out with Shelly for the boys' amusement.

Veronica talks to Sean Friedrich and tells him about the girl-on-girl event and that Dick and Beaver took her over to a bed and argued about who should have sex with her. Veronica talks to Dick, who presents a different account of events, saying that he didn't drug her and that he found Beaver with Veronica already. Veronica approaches Beaver, who gives a set of events more similar to that of Sean. However, after Dick and Sean leave, he purports to have run away and vomited before he could bring himself to rape her. Keith says that he has to leave for an engagement in Vegas. Logan talks to Aaron, but Aaron does not even know Logan's birth date. Veronica talks to Carrie Bishop (Leighton Meester), who says that she saw Veronica having sex with Duncan. Veronica confronts Duncan, who denies the rape accusations and remembers comforting Veronica in her drugged state. Duncan says that the sex was consensual but was nevertheless ashamed of it because he knew that—confirming Veronica's fears—they were siblings. Distraught, Veronica finally shares with Wallace everything she knows. Keith calls a prostitute in Vegas for an unknown reason, while Veronica apologizes to Logan and tells him about the situation with Duncan. Back in Vegas, Keith talks to the prostitute, Cheyenne, about Abel Koontz, as Cheyenne and Koontz were together at the time of Lilly's murder. Veronica and Logan go into his darkened house, kissing, only to realize too late that Aaron is throwing a surprise party for him—meaning that virtually the entire high school now knows that they are dating.

In response to rudeness from Dick, Logan announces that anyone who has a problem with Veronica can leave; to Logan's surprise, Duncan abruptly exits the party. Madison acts friendly and gives Veronica a cocktail, but Meg warns Veronica against drinking it because Madison has likely spat in it—a treatment Madison calls "A Trip to the Dentist." Veronica confronts Madison, who admits that at Shelly Pomroy's party she gave Veronica A Trip to the Dentist with her own (unbeknownst to her) drugged drink. Unable to unlock his car, Duncan flies into a rage and starts smashing it; coming upon him engaged thus, Meg chastises him and accuses him of still loving Veronica. Logan and Veronica start kissing but Logan stops to admit his role in Veronica's rape: at Shelly Pomroy's party, hoping simply to get him to relax, he gave Duncan a drugged drink. When Logan leaves Veronica alone to get some alcohol, she notices a camera in the ceiling fan. She investigates further and finds a hidden monitor and recorder, suggesting that Logan was in the habit of using them secretly to record his sexual conquests, and perhaps had planned to film Veronica. She leaves and Weevil gives her a ride home. Arriving home, she discovers her mother has returned and is sitting with her father.

== Arc significance ==
Keith finds Duncan in Cuba. After a lengthy investigation, Veronica concludes that she and Duncan had consensual sex when they were both drugged. The Kanes believe that Veronica is Duncan's sister, and Keith learns that Abel Koontz couldn't have killed Lilly. Veronica goes public with her relationship with Logan before finding a series of cameras in his bedroom.

== Production ==
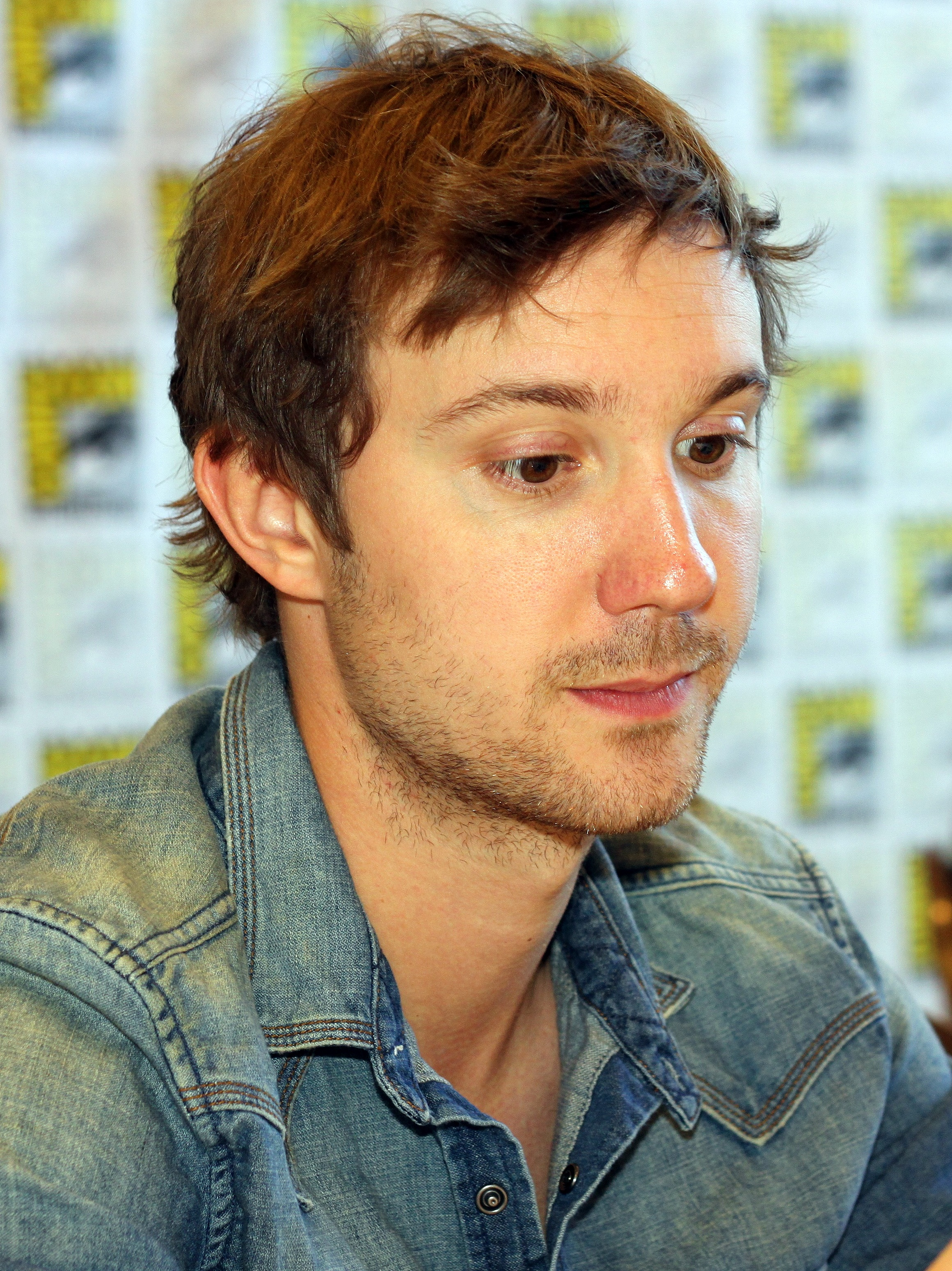
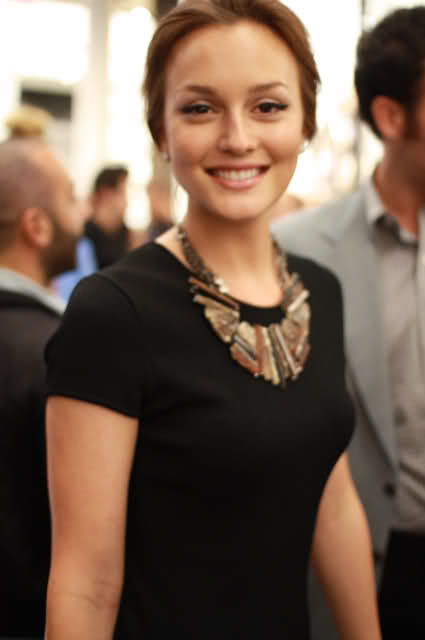
"A Trip to the Dentist" features the reappearance of many guest-starring characters featured in one previous episode, including Luke (Sam Huntington, left) and Carrie Bishop (Leighton Meester, right).

The episode was originally called "Up on the Roofie", referencing the episode's theme of roofies, before being changed to the final title of "A Trip to the Dentist". "A Trip to the Dentist" has the return of several guest stars from a previous single episode, including Luke (Sam Huntington) from "You Think You Know Somebody", Cole (Daniel Bess) from "Like a Virgin", Casey Gant (Jonathan Bennett) from "Drinking the Kool-Aid", Sean Friedrich (Kevin Sheridan) from "An Echolls Family Christmas", and Carrie Bishop (Leighton Meester) from "Mars vs. Mars". Within the context of the episode, these characters reappeared so that Veronica could ask them what they knew about the party where she was raped.

This episode reintroduces and resolves Veronica's rape, introduced earlier in the season. However, it had been largely ignored until this point in the series. The episode was the third and final episode of the series directed by Marcos Siega, after "Drinking the Kool-Aid" and "Mars vs. Mars". In addition, the episode marks regular writer Diane Ruggiero's sixth writing credit for the show. After the episode aired, Rob Thomas called the episode "our high-water mark". Commenting on Ruggiero writing the episode, he stated, "She was really my right hand writing the series, and it felt good to have someone who knew the voices as well as I did. We were both in a comfort zone, both writing this show and writing with each other."

In one scene of "A Trip to the Dentist", Weevil (Francis Capra) accuses Logan (Jason Dohring) of having hit Lilly during their relationship. The series' writers were planning to develop that plot strand into a storyline, with it eventually being revealed that Duncan had hit Lilly during an epileptic seizure. However, the storyline was abandoned in order to make time for other story arcs. Thomas commented, "At the end of the day, I don't want people thinking that Logan hit Lilly. I did, however, want Weevil to believe it." Although Veronica concludes in this episode that she had consensual sex with Duncan while they were both under the influence of roofies, more information about the night is later revealed in the show's second-season finale, "Not Pictured", in which it is revealed that Cassidy "Beaver" Casablancas raped her. When asked whether the writers knew that Beaver would be eventually revealed as the rapist when writing "A Trip to the Dentist", Thomas responded, "I wish I could claim that we were that clever." The writers realized that there was a moment in the episode's script where Beaver could have raped Veronica roughly a month after its airing.

== Themes ==
The narrative style of "A Trip to the Dentist", in which Veronica's fate unfolds through flashbacks focalized through her various peers, establishes in fact the opposite — that everyone bears guilt for the season-long exploitation of the heroine. Meg describes a drunk Veronica receiving body shots…from various classmates. Sean narrates a particularly vile vignette in which Dick Casablancas drags an unconscious Veronica into the guest bedroom and invites his younger brother Beaver to rape her. […] In effect, while "no one" raped Veronica, everyone bears responsibility for an evening in which she was repeatedly violated. Had the sympathetic Meg, the affable Casey, or even the odious Sean handled any portion of their interaction with her differently, she would not have been so abused.

— Sarah Whitney, in Investigating Veronica Mars: Essays on the Teen Detective Series

The episode, and particularly its treatment of rape, has been discussed in books of essays on Veronica Mars and elsewhere. Victoria E. Thomas, writing for In Media Res, opined that Veronica frequently distances herself from her rape, noting a scene in the pilot in which she states, "I'm no longer that girl." She regarded "A Trip to the Dentist" as a way for Veronica to heal from her rape, writing "Her healing is tied to finding out who raped her; a simple solution to a complex issue. This choice could mirror our present day stigma and lack of support for survivors of sexual assault, or it could simply allow the producers to erase her identity as a sexual assault survivor, leading the audience to believe that the strength of the character is not tied to her rape."

Sarah Whitney, in Investigating Veronica Mars: Essays on the Teen Detective Series, found the episode's portrayal of rape "troubling". She wrote, "One of the reasons this ending has always been problematic for me as a viewer is that it is a too-familiar script. Women are frequently told (or tell themselves) that they have "misinterpreted" sexual situations by missing cues ("leading men on") or by being "unclear" about their lack of consent. Furthermore, the episode leaves us bereft of a villain that can be nailed to the wall for forcible rape." The writer went on to state that instead of placing the blame on a single person, "A Trip to the Dentist" blamed several people for Veronica's rape. Whitney also wrote that despite that the "official resolution of the rape narrative denies a traditional 'whodunit' ending," it makes a statement that she was raped by an "unfeeling class of people."

James and Mona Rocha argued that while "Veronica showed poor judgment in the episode, the blame for her rape should not be put on her—instead, Dick, Logan, Sean, Dick, and Cassidy (Beaver) should take the blame. Responsibility and blame aren't zero-sum reckonings, such that adding to one person's blame automatically subtracts it from someone else's." Regarding Logan, they stated that "she wouldn't have been raped, if not for Logan's buying the GHB." On Dick, they wrote that "Dick didn't intend to drug Veronica, but he did intend to drug someone." The pair argued that Veronica made some choices that were causally related to her rape, but they concluded that she did not deserve blame. "If someone like Veronica makes a bad prudential choice that causes her harm, then maybe she should blame herself, but we can't blame her for any moral wrong done to her as a result. She may have acted foolishly, but that was within her rights."

== Reception ==
=== Ratings ===
In its original broadcast, "A Trip to the Dentist" received 2.85 million viewers, marking a decrease from the previous episode and ranking 100th of 114 in the weekly rankings.

=== Reviews ===
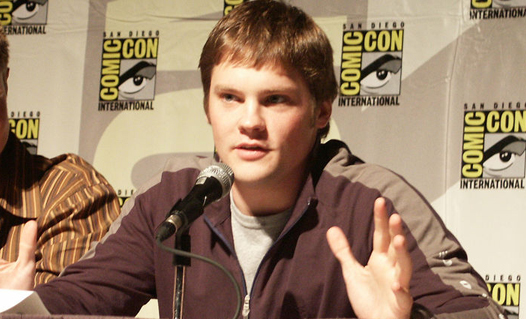
Many reviewers commented on the plot twist involving Duncan Kane (Teddy Dunn, pictured).

The episode received critical acclaim. Kenneth Nguyen from The Age commented "'A Trip to the Dentist', is perhaps the most complex, confronting installment thus far of a series that prides itself on being complex and confronting." The reporter went on to praise the "expertly scripted" reveal and thought Diane Ruggiero's "command of the tightrope high-school milieu seems pretty much spot-on. It is Ruggiero's resolution of the mystery, however, that will keep fans talking. Like the best resolutions, I suppose, it raises more questions than it answers."

Complex gave the episode a positive review, writing that it was overshadowed by "Leave It to Beaver", but that it was also a good episode by itself as well. "[The date rape mystery] all comes to a head in the penultimate episode, which puts Veronica on the emotional rollercoaster until she gets to the uncomfortable truth." The magazine also praised the reappearances of guest stars: "what really makes the episode special is the way it trots out every supporting player and case-of-the-week guest star." IGN ranked the episode 4th on its list of the top ten Veronica Mars episodes, saying that "'A Trip to the Dentist'" is a heavy episode that expertly shows how different people remember the same situation. The fact that Veronica has to threaten people who were at the party into telling her the truth is frakking painful. It's made even more sad when you realize that the version she believed to be the truth actually wasn't."

Rowan Kaiser of The A.V. Club gave a positive review, stating that the reveal was "an effective narrative, and one which creates a "satisfying" resolution for the viewer as well as the character. Veronica Mars has done a good job of subverting expectations on a regular basis, but it's still a TV show, with requirements for satisfying resolutions. [...] Which is my roundabout way of saying that while I wasn't surprised by the reveal that it was Duncan Kane, I was impressed by how well it worked up to that point. It had to be Duncan or someone totally irrelevant and shocking." Television Without Pity gave the episode an "A+", its fourth such rating for the series, after "An Echolls Family Christmas", "Clash of the Tritons", and "M.A.D.".

Conversely, Price Peterson, writing for TV.com, gave a more mixed review, heavily criticizing the resolution to Veronica's rape case. While calling it an "entertaining episode", he said that it had an "appalling message." He explained by writing that "[r]egardless of Duncan having been drugged, Veronica could not give consent to him any more than she could to the dudes who were playing puppet-girl with her during the party. Regardless of the retroactive comfort of knowing that she'd lost her virginity to someone she liked, Veronica did not remember it...That kind of psychological trauma goes away immediately?" Kimberly Roots of TVLine called the episode "cathartic" and that "we get a huge reveal from Duncan, some unintentionally very public LoVe PDA and a say-it-ain't-so-Logan! cliffhanger that swings us right into the season finale."

BuzzFeed ranked the episode 3rd on its complete ranking of Veronica Mars episodes, comparing it to Buffy the Vampire Slayer—"both these shows have always managed a perfect balance between high school drama (gossip, futile betrayals, and short-lived romances) and extremely powerful and dark themes (sexism, rape, harassment, addiction, and domestic violence)." TVLine ranked the episode 2nd on a similar list, only below "Pilot". Wired called the episode a necessary episode if one binge-watched the show, writing that "The information she uncovers is staggeringly heartbreaking, and the way in which the show handled the arc pays off with complex, difficult confrontations."
