= M.A.D. (Veronica Mars) =

- Veronica Mars episode
- Episode no.: Season 1 Episode 20
- Directed by: John Kretchmer
- Written by: Phil Klemmer; John Enbom
- Production code: 2T5719
- Original air date: April 26, 2005

Guest appearances
- Daran Norris as Cliff McCormack; Tina Majorino as Cindy "Mac" Mackenzie; Christopher B. Duncan as Clarence Wiedman; Jeff D'Agostino as Tad Wilson; Erica Gimpel as Alicia Fennel; Natalia Barron as Carmen Ruiz; Kyle Gallner as Cassidy Casablancas; Robert Clark as Seth Rafter; Ryan Hansen as Dick Casablancas; Harry Hamlin as Aaron Echolls

Episode chronology
← Previous "Hot Dogs"	Next → "A Trip to the Dentist"
- Veronica Mars season 1

"M.A.D." is the twentieth episode of the first season of the American mystery television series Veronica Mars. Written by Phil Klemmer and John Enbom and directed by John Kretchmer, the episode premiered on April 26, 2005 on UPN.

The series depicts the adventures of Veronica Mars (Kristen Bell) as she deals with life as a high school student while moonlighting as a private detective. In this episode, Veronica investigates a situation involving a girl, Carmen (Natalia Barron), who is being blackmailed by her boyfriend with an explicit and revealing video. Meanwhile, Veronica and Logan's (Jason Dohring) relationship slowly becomes public, and Veronica receives some important information regarding her sexual assault case.

== Synopsis ==
A girl named Carmen breaks up with her long-term boyfriend, Tad (Jeff D'Agostino). However, before he leaves, Tad shows her a phone which has some embarrassing video of her that she does not even remember when she was drunk. Veronica agrees to help retrieve her phone. Later, Veronica and Logan make out in the bathroom. Veronica and Tad both have their phones confiscated, but only Veronica gets hers back, indicating that Veronica stole it, which she did. Keith (Enrico Colantoni) notices an ad for $50,000 for the whereabouts of Duncan Kane (Teddy Dunn). The two start on the project of finding Duncan before Keith has to leave on a date. Carmen enters Mars Investigations and smashes Tad's phone, but Tad instant messages Veronica with the video again. Tad and Carmen get back together (though it is strongly implied that he is blackmailing her). A student mocks Tad for his supposed homosexuality, even though he wants to join the Navy (referencing Don't Ask, Don't Tell, which was in effect at the time). Veronica talks to Carmen again, and she has a new plan, which involves Carmen inviting Tad to a romantic walk on the beach.

Weevil (Francis Capra) informs Veronica that Duncan bought a cheap car shortly before he ran away. Logan and Veronica go back to his house before Aaron Echolls (Harry Hamlin) awkwardly comes in. While Veronica is in the bathroom, Logan's friends Dick (Ryan Hansen) and Beaver (Kyle Gallner) come, leading Veronica to escape. Aaron attempts to be helpful by giving her a ride home and returning her purse, and Aaron is generally supportive of Veronica and Logan's relationship. At the boardwalk, Carmen asks Tad to talk to Seth, an openly gay student, while Veronica takes pictures. Keith gets a lead on Duncan's stolen car, which is in Tijuana, Mexico, but Duncan does not have it. Veronica talks to Mac (Tina Majorino) and asks her to create a "sexually explicit website" involving Tad. Veronica and Carmen talk to Tad, who show him the recently created website, and Veronica says she will send the website to the Naval Academy if he does not break up with Carmen and deletes the video of Carmen. Logan invites Veronica on a date out, indicating that he wants to make their relationship public. Logan also says that he thinks that Aaron likes her. Veronica notices an ad in the newspaper, which says that they are seeking Lianne Mars (Corinne Bohrer), who has just been put under a notice of legal proceedings in the classified section.

Veronica looks up how soon the situation with her mother is happening (which is in under an hour). Veronica tracks Keith in order to find out what the ad was for, and she follows him to a hotel before finding him with Alicia on the ballroom dance floor. At school the next day, Veronica and Carmen find out that Tad has released the video of Carmen. Veronica suggests sending the incriminating email in retaliation, but Carmen refuses to oblige with her request. Veronica takes a look at a screenshot from the video and notices the same lanterns as Shelly Pomroy's house, where she was drugged and raped a year earlier. Mac talks to Veronica about a passport she found of Roberto Nalbandion, who lives in Argentina and is likely an alias for Duncan. Veronica enlists Mac's help in time-stamping the date of the video, and it turns out that it was the same night of Veronica's rape. Clarence Wiedman (Christopher B. Duncan) confronts Alicia Fennel (Erica Gimpel) about her relationship with Keith, who tells her about Wallace's (Percy Daggs III) bugging of his office. Veronica gets Weevil and the biker gang to tie Tad to the flagpole, and she tells him that she knows about the roofies the night of Shelly Pomroy's party, where she was raped. He says that Logan gave him the drugs, which were not roofies, but GHB. At their date, Logan waits alone.

== Cultural references ==
The episode's cultural references include:

- A stuffed figure of Garfield can be seen.
- Veronica says jokingly that Keith and Alicia play Bingo at Veterans of Foreign Wars on their dates.
- Veronica says "Okely-dokely," a reference to the character Ned Flanders from The Simpsons.
- Veronica's teacher mentions a tin can telephone.
- Keith says "money for nothing," referencing the Dire Straits song of the same name.
- The episode mentions the website eBay.
- Carmen and Veronica reference the action drama film Top Gun.
- Tad calls Seth Boy George.
- Carmen compares her situation to that of the Star Wars Kid.
- The episode mentions that Duncan aced his PSATs.
- The episode makes strong references to Don't ask, don't tell.

== Arc significance ==
- Keith discovers the Kanes are offering $50,000 to find Duncan.
- Mac finds out that Duncan bought an Argentinian passport for himself.
- Keith runs a missing persons notice in the paper for Lianne Mars, so that he will be eligible for divorce, which Veronica notices.
- Clarence Wiedman shows Alicia Fennel the bug Veronica planted in his office and tells her to break-up with Keith or she will be fired.
- Carmen can't remember the night of the party where Tad taped her. It was the same night that Veronica was raped.
- Tad Wilson, while taped to the flagpole, admits that he used GHB on Carmen Ruiz and that he got it from Logan.

== Music ==
The following songs can be heard in the episode:

- "Gold Rush" by Kissinger
- "Me and You and a Dog Named Boo" by Lobo
- "Finding Out True Love is Blind" by Louis XIV
- "Tu Abandono" by X. Herrera
- "Let's Sail Away" by Josh Kramon and Jeff D'Agostino
- "Love Is Here to Stay" by George and Ira Gershwin (performed by Louis Armstrong and Ella Fitzgerald)
- "Crimson and Clover" by Tommy James and the Shondells

== Production ==
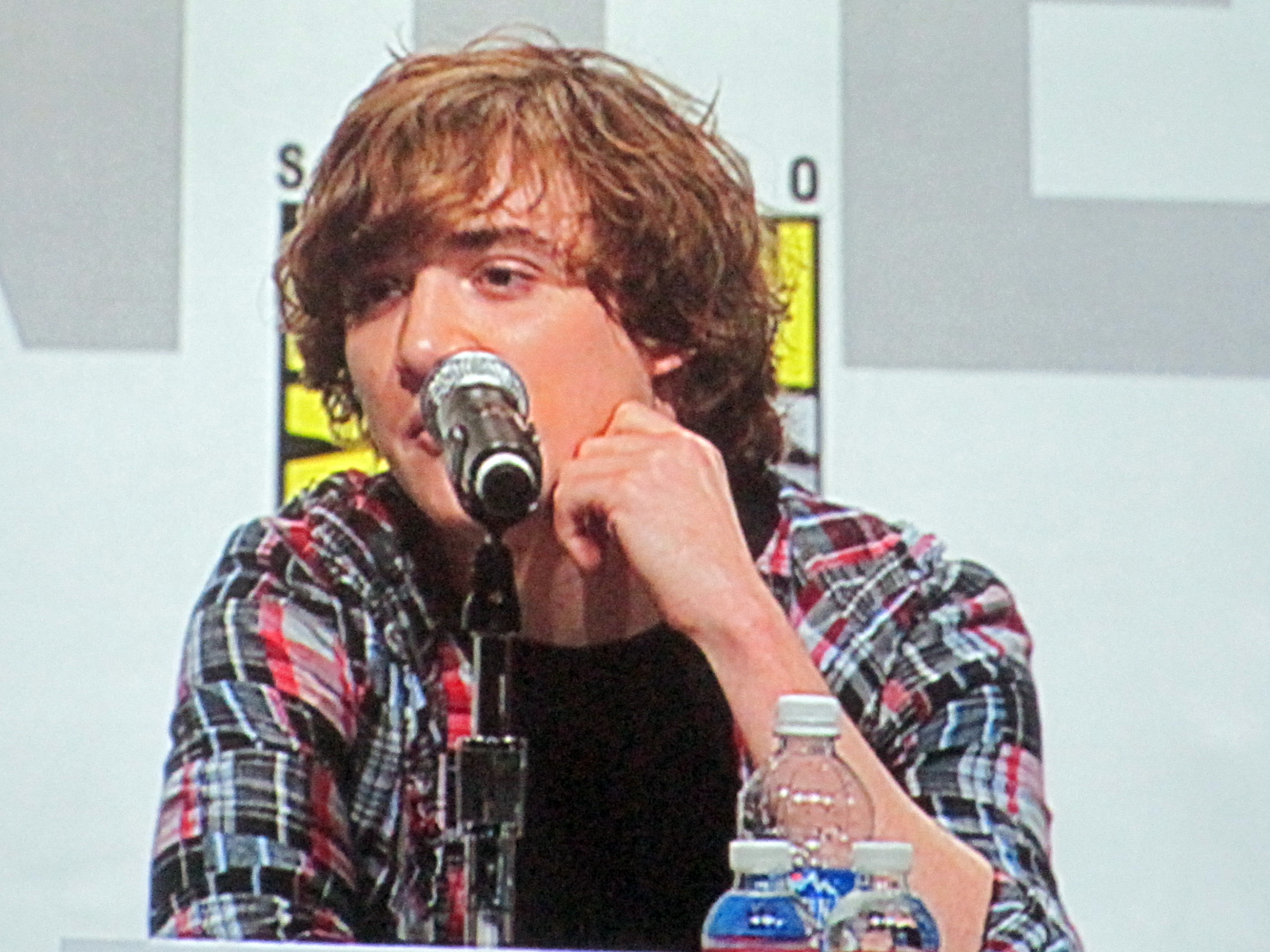
"M.A.D." features the first appearance of Cassidy Casablancas, portrayed by Kyle Gallner (pictured), who would later become a series regular in the second season.

This episode was originally titled "Tit for Tad" before being changed to the current title of "M.A.D." This episode features the first appearance of character Cassidy "Beaver" Casablancas, portrayed by Kyle Gallner, who was later promoted to starring status in the show's second season along with his brother, Dick Casablancas (Ryan Hansen), who also appears in the episode. The character was created so that Dick would have a younger brother who was the complete opposite of him. In the episode, Carmen likens her situation to that of Paris Hilton, who guest starred earlier in the season (the episode "Credit Where Credit's Due") as Logan's then-girlfriend, Caitlin. The episode's title is an acronym for Mutually assured destruction, a military doctrine that two sides who have stockpiles of weapons of mass destruction will be hesitant to attack each other in fear of a Nuclear holocaust.

The character of Duncan (Teddy Dunn) does not appear in this episode despite being in the opening credits. The episode was co-written by Phil Klemmer and John Enbom. The episode marks Klemmer's fourth writing credit and Enbom's third writing credit (after "Lord of the Bling" and "Ruskie Business"). The episode was directed by John Kretchmer, featuring his third directing credit for the show (after "Silence of the Lamb" and "Weapons of Class Destruction".) Among the episode's many guest stars are several of the important recurring characters of the season, including Mac (Tina Majorino), Clarence Wiedman (Christopher B. Duncan), Alicia Fennel (Erica Gimpel), and Aaron Echolls (Harry Hamlin).

== Reception ==
=== Ratings ===
In its original broadcast, "M.A.D." received 3.04 million viewers, ranking 100th of 113 in the weekly rankings. This episode marked an increase in 550,000 viewers from the previous episode, and it also is the second-highest rating of the series's first season (after "The Wrath of Con").

=== Reviews ===
Rowan Kaiser, writing for The A.V. Club, gave the episode a positive review, praising Veronica's involvement in the main storyline. "Veronica is a few steps ahead of everyone in the main investigation. Going into the show, I figured that Veronica would be fairly active as a character—you'd have to be to investigate mysteries—but I am a bit surprised by how much she is the driving force of the main plot." However, she also wrote that "There is no moral judgment attached by the show to Carmen's inaction, unlike Mandy last week." Television Without Pity gave the episode an "A+", its third such rating for the series (after "An Echolls Family Christmas" and "Clash of the Tritons").

Conversely, Price Peterson of TV.com gave a negative review, criticizing the episode's treatment of homosexuality. "Are you effing kidding me with this homophobic B.C.? I realize this was 2005 which is definitely OLDEN TIME, but to have our heroine use homosexuality as a weapon against someone? […] Honestly, this was irresponsible writing and I hope credited writers Phil Klemmer and John Enbom are embarrassed about it."
