= Veronica Mars season 1 =

Veronica Mars
- Season 1
- DVD cover
- Starring: Kristen Bell; Percy Daggs III; Teddy Dunn; Jason Dohring; Sydney Tamiia Poitier; Francis Capra; Enrico Colantoni
- No. of episodes: 22

Release
- Original network: UPN
- Original release: September 22, 2004 – May 10, 2005

Season chronology
- Next → Season 2

The first season of Veronica Mars, an American drama television series created by Rob Thomas, premiered on UPN in the United States on September 22, 2004. The series was produced by Warner Bros. Television, Silver Pictures Television and Rob Thomas Productions, and Joel Silver and Thomas served as the executive producers.

The season revolves around Veronica Mars (Kristen Bell), a high school student and private investigator in the fictional Southern California seaside town of Neptune. When Veronica's best friend, Lilly Kane (Amanda Seyfried), is murdered, her life falls apart. Her father, County Sheriff Keith Mars (Enrico Colantoni), accuses Lilly's father of being involved in the murder. This provokes Neptune's wrath and Keith's ousting as sheriff in a recall election. Veronica's mother, Lianne (Corinne Bohrer), develops a drinking problem and leaves town. Veronica's "09er" friends—wealthy students from the fictional 90909 ZIP code—force her to choose between them and her father; she chooses her father. Keith opens a private investigation agency, Mars Investigations, where Veronica works part-time.

The series was critically acclaimed, and appeared on several fall television best lists. The first season garnered an average of 2.5 million viewers per all 22 episodes in the US. Out of all regular primetime programming that aired during the 2004–2005 American television season, Veronica Mars ranked #148 out of 156, according to the Nielsen ratings system. The pilot was watched by 2.49 million viewers, while the finale was watched by 2.99 million viewers.

== Cast ==
The main characters of the first season include (from left to right): Mallory Dent, Wallace Fennel, Eli "Weevil" Navarro, Duncan Kane, Veronica Mars, Logan Echolls, and Keith Mars.

The first season features a cast of seven actors who receive star billing. Kristen Bell portrays the titular Veronica Mars, a high school junior and skilled private detective. Teddy Dunn plays Duncan Kane, Veronica's ex-boyfriend and Lilly's brother. Jason Dohring plays Logan Echolls, the "bad-boy" 09er son of an A-list actor. Percy Daggs III portrays Wallace Fennel, Veronica's best friend and frequent partner in solving mysteries. Francis Capra portrays Eli "Weevil" Navarro, the leader of the PCH Biker gang and Veronica's friend. Enrico Colantoni plays Veronica's father Keith Mars, a private investigator and former Balboa County Sheriff. Sydney Tamiia Poitier plays Mallory Dent, Veronica's journalism teacher at Neptune High. Although she was given series regular billing, Poitier appeared in only four episodes, but was given credit for seven.

Kristen Bell was chosen to play Veronica Mars from more than 500 women who auditioned for the role. Bell felt that it was "just luck" that Rob Thomas saw that "I have some sass to me, and that's exactly what he wanted". Bell thought that it was her cheerleader looks and an outsider's attitude that set her apart from the other women who auditioned. Jason Dohring, who played Logan Echolls, originally auditioned for the role of Duncan Kane. Teddy Dunn originally auditioned for Logan, but ended up portraying Duncan Kane. Dohring felt that his audition for Duncan "was a little dark", and he was told by the producers that it was "not really right". The producers asked Dohring to read for the role of Logan, which involved reading Duncan's lines. Dohring acted one scene from the pilot, in which he shattered the headlights of a car with a crowbar. During the final auditions, Dohring read two times with Bell and met with the studio and the network. When reading with Bell, Dohring acted the whole scene as if he had raped her, and tried to give the character an evil and fun feel. At the time of Dohring's audition for Logan, the character was only going to be a guest star in the pilot.

Thomas described Amanda Seyfried, who portrayed the murdered Lilly Kane, as "the biggest surprise of the year". When casting a series regular, he was able to see all the best actors in town, mainly because they all wanted to be a series regular. When casting Lilly Kane, who would only appear from time-to-time as "the dead girl", Thomas did not receive the same standard of actors. Thomas said that he had "never had a more cut and dry audition" than he did with Seyfried. He said that she was "about 100 times better than anyone else that we saw, she was just spectacular". He continued by saying that she ended up being so good in the series that he used her three or four more times than he initially planned.

== Episodes ==
When Veronica discovers new evidence that suggests that Lilly's convicted killer is innocent, she decides to investigate the case. As Veronica delves deeper into the murder, she also works on other investigations, seeks her mother's whereabouts and deals with the aftermath of being drugged and raped during an 09er party. Veronica, no longer part of the school's wealthy in-crowd, makes some new friends: Wallace, Neptune High basketball star; Weevil, leader of the PCHers, a biker gang; and Mac, Neptune High's resident computer genius. Using her friends' resources, as well as those provided by her father and his contacts, Veronica gains a reputation for sleuthing and finds her skills in increasingly high demand at her school. Things get more complicated when Veronica falls into a relationship with Lilly's ex-boyfriend Logan, who for a time held Veronica partly responsible for Lilly's death and went out of his way to harass her.

No. overall	No. in season	Title	Directed by	Written by	Original release date	Prod. code	U.S. viewers (millions)
1	1	"Pilot"	Mark Piznarski	Rob Thomas	September 22, 2004	475258	2.49
Veronica starts her junior year at Neptune High by freeing new student Wallace Fennel, who had been duct-taped to the school flag pole as retribution for calling the police on two PCH bikers shoplifting alcohol. Celeste Kane hires Keith to follow her husband Jake, and Veronica stakes out a seedy motel, where she photographs Jake meeting an unseen woman. Flashbacks depict last year's murder of Veronica's best friend, Lilly Kane, and Veronica's date rape at an 09er party.
2	2	"Credit Where Credit's Due"	Mark Piznarski	Rob Thomas	September 28, 2004	2T5701	2.21
When Weevil is accused of credit card fraud, Veronica sets out to prove him innocent. At school, Veronica is put into Ms. Dent's journalism class, and finds she has a flat tire after class. Veronica accepts a car ride with her ex-boyfriend Duncan, which turns out to be very awkward. Troy Vandegraff arrives in town and enrolls in Neptune High. Veronica also discovers that a red light camera picture proves Lilly was alive hours after her official time of death. Paris Hilton guest stars as Caitlin Ford, Logan's girlfriend.
3	3	"Meet John Smith"	Harry Winer	Jed Seidel	October 12, 2004	2T5702	2.71
A student hires Veronica to find his father, whom he believes is dead. Veronica and Troy's relationship deepens, Keith meets Veronica's guidance counselor, Rebecca James, and Veronica begins looking for her mother. Duncan temporarily stops taking his antidepressants, and hallucinates about his dead sister, Lilly, telling him that her secret will be revealed.
4	4	"The Wrath of Con"	Michael Fields	Diane Ruggiero	October 19, 2004	2T5703	3.12
Veronica helps Wallace's new girlfriend, Georgia, after she is cheated out of $6,000 by a couple of college students running a Nigerian scam. Veronica and her friends defeat the students' technology-heavy security system and hold their data hostage to force the return of Georgia's money. Logan assembles what is supposed to be a serious video memorial of Lilly, but includes some wilder footage Veronica provided. Logan's compilation is well received by the students at the dedication of Lilly's fountain on the Neptune High grounds.
5	5	"You Think You Know Somebody"	Nick Gomez	Dayna Lynne North	October 26, 2004	2T5704	2.73
Troy's father's car is stolen and Veronica has only a limited amount of time to find it before Troy is shipped off to a Catholic boarding school. Veronica finds a set of photographs in her mother's safe deposit box which depict Veronica centered in telescopic sights. Lianne calls Veronica and says that she is fine, and that everything will make sense when the time is right.
6	6	"Return of the Kane"	Sarah Pia Anderson	Story by : Rob Thomas; Teleplay by : Phil Klemmer	November 2, 2004	2T5705	2.86
Logan pressures Duncan to run for class president against Wanda Varner's anti-09er platform. Duncan wins, but Veronica suspects that the election was rigged. Logan's father, A-list movie star Aaron Echolls, catches his son organizing Bumfights-like street fights. Abel Koontz fires his public defender, and Veronica discovers that Lilly's shoes, which were in her room after her murder, were found on Abel's houseboat.
7	7	"The Girl Next Door"	Nick Marck	Story by : Jed Seidel; Teleplay by : Jed Seidel & Diane Ruggiero	November 9, 2004	2T5706	2.74
When her pregnant neighbor Sarah disappears, Veronica tries to find out if Sarah's boyfriend killed her. Logan and Weevil get detention together, and Logan discovers that Lilly was secretly seeing Weevil before her death. Veronica learns that her mom and Jake Kane were dating in high school, and a flashback shows Veronica trying to find out why Duncan broke up with her. Sarah is revealed to be a victim of incest. Her pregnancy was the result of sexual assault committed by her own stepfather. When Sarah finally confesses this trauma to her mother, a violent altercation breaks out. Keith Mars rushes in and shoots the stepfather to protect Sarah and her mother. Sarah is ultimately hospitalized and survives the traumatic ordeal, while her stepfather is taken away.
8	8	"Like a Virgin"	Guy Bee	Aury Wallington	November 23, 2004	2T5707	2.76
A purity test circulating around Neptune High has a negative impact on both Meg Manning, Veronica's last 09er friend, and Veronica herself. Veronica recruits Mac, a computer genius, to figure out who is publishing the fake purity tests. Abel Koontz tells Veronica that Jake Kane is probably her biological father. Keith helps out Mrs. Fennell, who is having doubts about Wallace hanging out with Veronica.
9	9	"Drinking the Kool-Aid"	Marcos Siega	Story by : Rob Thomas; Teleplay by : Russell Smith	November 30, 2004	2T5708	2.40
Veronica investigates Clarence Wiedman, the head of Kane Security who took pictures of her and sent them to her mother, on her own initiative. Concurrently, she investigates the Moon Calf Collective, a peace-loving cult that 09er Casey joined. Veronica takes a DNA test to find out if Keith is actually her biological father, but she destroys the results without looking at them.
10	10	"An Echolls Family Christmas"	Nick Marck	Diane Ruggiero	December 14, 2004	2T5710	1.90
When the money from a poker game between Logan, Weevil, and others disappears, Veronica is called in to investigate. Keith investigates a mysterious stalker whom Aaron fears will ruin his Christmas party. When Aaron is stabbed by his former lover, his wife Lynn learns of his infidelity.
11	11	"Silence of the Lamb"	John Kretchmer	Jed Seidel & Dayna Lynne North	January 4, 2005	2T5709	2.84
Students hire Veronica to dig up dirt on their parents, and she discovers that Mac was switched at birth with 09er Madison Sinclair, who was among those at the party where Veronica was raped. Keith and Sheriff Lamb work together to solve the E-String Strangler case.
12	12	"Clash of the Tritons"	David Barrett	Phil Klemmer & Aury Wallington	January 11, 2005	2T5711	2.91
When Veronica is arrested for selling fake IDs, she tries to find out who framed her, suspecting members of a secret society at Neptune High. Aaron hires Keith to find out who is causing him bad publicity. Weevil confesses during a grief counseling session that he had secretly dated Lilly, but she had gone back to Logan. Aaron threatens Lynn with a divorce, and her car is later shown abandoned on the Coronado Bridge.
13	13	"Lord of the Bling"	Steve Gomer	John Enbom	February 8, 2005	2T5712	2.97
Yolanda, an old friend of Veronica's, is kidnapped. Yolanda's father, rap producer Percy "Bone" Hamilton, hires Keith to find her. Aaron tries to grieve after Lynn's suicide, but Logan thinks that he is faking, and that she is still alive. Logan asks Veronica to help find his mother.
14	14	"Mars vs. Mars"	Marcos Siega	Story by : Rob Thomas; Teleplay by : Jed Seidel & Diane Ruggiero	February 15, 2005	2T5713	2.70
When 09er gossip queen Carrie Bishop claims she had an affair with Mr. Rooks, Veronica's favorite teacher, Veronica sets out to prove his innocence. Keith, however, has been hired to prove Mr. Rooks' guilt. Veronica finds a video that shows Lynn plunging into the river from the bridge, and learns that Abel Koontz is terminally ill.
15	15	"Ruskie Business"	Guy Bee	Phil Klemmer & John Enbom	February 22, 2005	2T5714	2.34
Veronica is hired by a Russian Internet order bride to find the groom that she abandoned. Meg and Veronica uncover the identity of Meg's secret admirer, who turns out to be Duncan. Logan discovers that his sister Trina is back in town, and Veronica finds her mother in a bar.
16	16	"Betty and Veronica"	Michael Fields	Diane Ruggiero	March 29, 2005	2T5715	2.33
When someone steals Neptune High's mascot, Polly the Parrot, Veronica goes undercover at Neptune High's rival school, Pan High. Veronica checks her mother into an inpatient alcohol rehabilitation program, using her college savings to fund the cost. Lianne admits that she does not know whether Veronica's father is Keith or Jake.
17	17	"Kanes and Abel's"	Nick Marck	Carolyn Murray	April 5, 2005	2T5716	2.78
Veronica finds Abel Koontz's daughter, Amelia DeLongpre, and searches for evidence that Jake Kane paid Abel to falsely confess to Lilly's murder before Clarence Wiedman gets to Amelia. Veronica is hired to find out who is mysteriously harassing a classmate.
18	18	"Weapons of Class Destruction"	John Kretchmer	Jed Seidel	April 12, 2005	2T5717	2.30
Veronica discovers that Neptune High has been receiving bomb threats, and is kidnapped by a suspect while investigating the case. Logan intervenes to save Veronica, and they end up kissing. Duncan learns that Veronica is still investigating Lilly's death, and leaves town.
19	19	"Hot Dogs"	Nick Marck	Dayna Lynne North	April 19, 2005	2T5718	2.48
When Mandy's dog vanishes, Veronica agrees to investigate and ventures into Neptune's seedy underbelly of dognapping rings. Weevil breaks into Lilly's room to steal a pink "spy pen", which she used to hold secret messages. Keith secretly takes hair samples from Veronica and sends them in for a DNA test. Veronica and Logan begin secretly dating.
20	20	"M.A.D."	John Kretchmer	Phil Klemmer & John Enbom	April 26, 2005	2T5719	3.04
When Carmen's boyfriend Tad blackmails her using a compromising video, Carmen turns to Veronica for help. Veronica devises a logical way to solve Carmen's problem, but Tad is functioning on emotion rather than logic. Tad admits to Veronica that he used GHB on Carmen, and that he received the drug from Logan. Veronica is shocked, as it was the same drug used on her before her rape at Shelly Pomroy's party.
21	21	"A Trip to the Dentist"	Marcos Siega	Diane Ruggiero	May 3, 2005	2T5720	2.85
New information gives Veronica a lead on what happened to her the night of Shelly Pomroy's party, where she was drugged and raped. Veronica's mother returns to town, and Logan's 09er friends find out that he is dating Veronica. Flashbacks reveal that Duncan dumped Veronica because his mother told him that Veronica was his half-sister.
22	22	"Leave It to Beaver"	Michael Fields	Story by : Rob Thomas; Teleplay by : Rob Thomas & Diane Ruggiero	May 10, 2005	2T5721	2.99
Dick's brother Cassidy admits Logan's whereabouts the day of Lilly's murder to Veronica, and her investigation concludes. Keith receives the DNA test results and tells Veronica that he is definitely her father. Veronica discovers that her mother left the alcohol rehabilitation program and asks her to leave town. Lianne does so, but steals Veronica's settlement check — which would have replaced the college funds she spent on Lianne's rehab — on her way out.

== Reception ==
=== Critical response ===
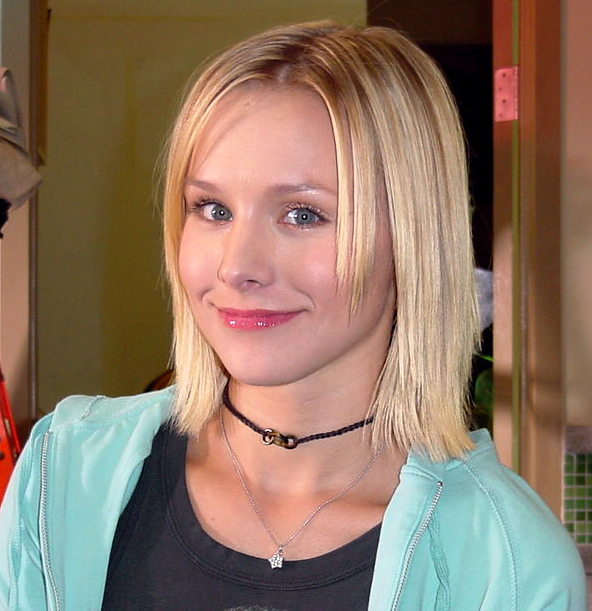
Kristen Bell's performance as the protagonist generated critical acclaim.

The review aggregator website Rotten Tomatoes reported an approval rating of 97% with an average score of 7.97/10, based on 30 reviews. The website's critics consensus reads, "Veronica Mars is geared towards teens, but its sharp writing, excellent acting and thoughtful subject matter make for an entertaining and attractive drama for TV fans of all ages". Metacritic gave the season a score—a weighted average based on the impressions of a select fifteen critical reviews—of 81, signifying "universal acclaim".

James Poniewozik of Time labeled the series as one of the six best dramas on television. He praised Bell as "a captivating star," and said that the series "uses its pulp premise to dramatize a universal teen experience: that growing up means sleuthing out the mystery of who you really are." Kay McFadden of The Seattle Times called Veronica Mars an update to the "classic California film noir". She felt that Veronica Mars was the best new series on UPN, and that the title character was potentially "this season's most interesting character creation". McFadden described the series as "Alias in its attitude, Raymond Chandler in its writing and The O.C. in its class-consciousness." James South of Paste praised the "crisp, clever writing", and noted the supporting characters were more than just plot devices. He commended Bell's portrayal of Veronica as "simultaneously smart, vulnerable, tough and injured", and found the guest stars were well-utilized. South wrote the remaining cast was "uniformly good", but gave Dohring a special mention for his acting. Stephanie Zacharek of Salon.com praised the first-season finale for being "just the sort of satisfying capper you look for in a series that, week after week, keeps you asking questions".

Robert Abele of LA Weekly said that "in this smart, engaging series about a former popular girl turned crime-solving high school outcast, the hard-boiled dialogue comes from its teen protagonist's mouth in a way that stabs any potential cutesiness in the heart with an ice pick." Joy Press of The Village Voice saw the series as "a sharp teen noir in the making", "[pulsing] with promise". However, Press felt that the series paled somewhat compared to the television series Wonderfalls. Filip Vukcevic of IGN gave the season a positive review, particularly praising the amount of audience participation. However, the reviewer felt that several of the main characters were undeveloped, and that Daggs III and Dunn, as well as their respective characters, were "boring". Vukcevic wrote that while the ultimate resolution to the murder was satisfying, it was not "world-shattering".

=== Awards ===
The first season was nominated for seven awards, winning one. In 2005, Veronica Mars received the American Film Institute Award for Television Programs of the Year, and was nominated for the Teen Choice Award for Choice TV Breakout Show, and the Television Critics Association Awards for Outstanding New Program of the Year. Kristen Bell was nominated for the Saturn Award for Best Television Actress, the Satellite Award for Outstanding Actress in a Series, Drama, the Teen Choice Award for Choice TV Breakout Performance, Female, and the Television Critics Association Awards for Individual Achievement in Drama.

== Distribution ==
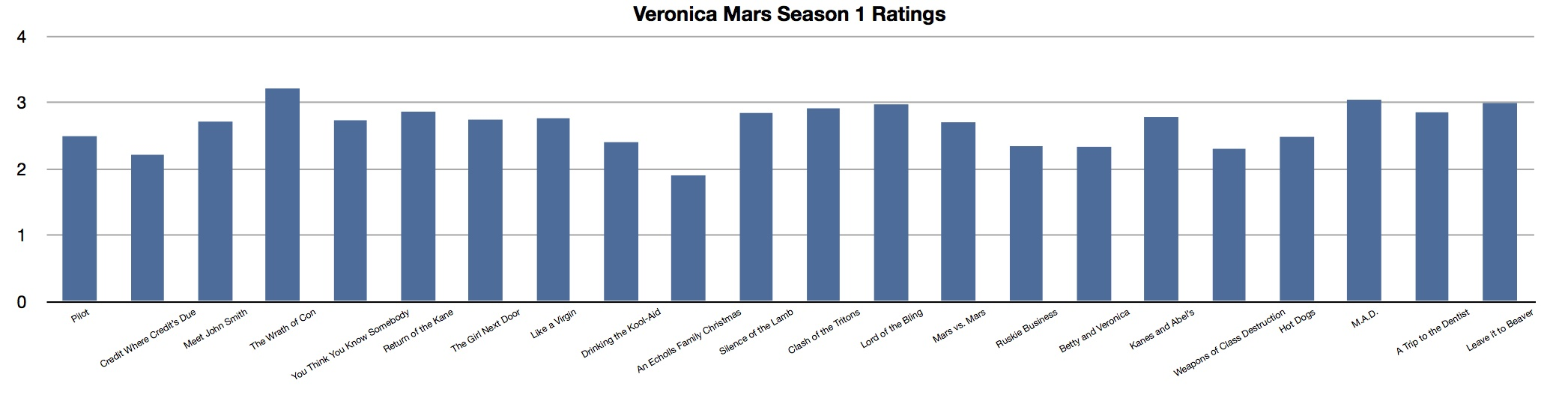
The ratings for the first season of Veronica Mars in its original United States airing.

The CTV Television Network began airing Veronica Mars in Canada as a mid-season replacement on May 30, 2005. Living began showing the series in the United Kingdom in October 2005, averaging 50,000 viewers per episode for its first season. Veronica Mars premiered in Australia by Network Ten on November 28, 2005, where the series saw erratic airings. TV2 began showing the series in New Zealand on July 15, 2005.

The first season of Veronica Mars was released in the US under the title Veronica Mars: The Complete First Season as a widescreen six-disc Region 1 DVD box set on October 11, 2005. In addition to all the episodes that had been aired, DVD extras included an extended "Pilot" episode, over 20 minutes of unaired scenes and an unaired opening sequence. The same set was released on May 16, 2008, in Region 2, and on June 4, 2008 in Region 4. Ben Fritz of Variety criticized the DVD for a lack of special features, but noted that the producers were forced to release the set early to attract more viewers. Fritz believed that Warner Bros. owed fans a better DVD set "chock full of commentaries, interviews and deleted scenes in context". Likewise, Anita Srikamswaren of the Pittsburgh Post-Gazette was surprised by the minimal number of extras. Srikamswaren pointed out that despite the early release, it was still two weeks after the second-season premiere.
