= Silence of the Lamb (Veronica Mars) =

- Veronica Mars episode
- Cindy "Mac" Mackenzie (Tina Majorino) puts her hand on her mother's car window after she watches her daughter with her adopted family.
- Episode no.: Season 1 Episode 11
- Directed by: John Kretchmer
- Written by: Jed Seidel; Dayna Lynne North
- Production code: 2T5709
- Original air date: January 4, 2005

Guest appearances
- Tina Majorino as Cindy "Mac" Mackenzie; Michael Muhney as Don Lamb; Max Greenfield as Leo D'Amato; Aaron Paul as Eddie LaRoche/"The Worm"; Steve Monroe as Gabe; Christopher B. Duncan as Clarence Wiedman; Amanda Noret as Madison Sinclair; Carlie Westerman as Lauren Sinclair

Episode chronology
← Previous "An Echolls Family Christmas"	Next → "Clash of the Tritons"
- Veronica Mars season 1

"Silence of the Lamb" is the eleventh episode of the first season of the American mystery television series Veronica Mars. Written by Jed Seidel and Dayna Lynne North and directed by John Kretchmer, the episode premiered on UPN on January 4, 2005, as the series' first episode in the new year.

The series depicts the adventures of Veronica Mars (Kristen Bell) as she deals with life as a high school student while moonlighting as a private detective. In this episode, Veronica helps Cindy "Mac" Mackenzie (Tina Majorino) find and reconnect with her birth parents and siblings. Meanwhile, Keith (Enrico Colantoni) is temporarily reassigned to the sheriff's department in order to help with a case involving a serial killer.

== Synopsis ==
One morning, Veronica talks to Keith about an old case involving a serial killer, the E-String Strangler, who has made a reappearance. Wallace (Percy Daggs III) also complains to her about the panic that's been going throughout the town because of the killer. At Neptune High, Madison Sinclair (Amanda Noret), a blonde cheerleader, celebrates her birthday in haughty, regal style and invites only her rich friends to her upcoming party. Meanwhile, another student, Jackson, asks Veronica to research his parents' past indiscretions to gain leverage in their criticisms of him. Sheriff Don Lamb (Michael Muhney) and the mayor of the town meet with Keith. After the conversation, Keith comes out and tells Veronica gleefully that he is going to start working at the sheriff's department again. But Keith says that it is only temporary, but he is getting paid his regular salary. Later, another student asks Veronica to find "dirt" on his parents. Sheriff Lamb and Keith explain the case to other police officers, but they have conflicting styles. Meanwhile, Veronica's kompromat business takes off, and Cindy "Mac" Mackenzie (Tina Majorino) notices. Mac proposes taking Veronica's efforts nationwide as a web-based business so they will both eventually have enough money for retirement savings. Veronica says she'll think about it. At Mac's request, Veronica discovers that Mac's parents once successfully sued the Neptune hospital for one million dollars because Mac was switched at birth with another baby. Keith and Sheriff Lamb visit a record shop, but they find nothing. Veronica visits Mac's house, and after refreshments are served by her blonde mother, shows Veronica her room. Veronica tells her that she was switched at birth with the popular cheerleader, Madison Sinclair.

Keith and Sheriff Lamb start their investigation at a local guitar shop, where the clerk mocks them by revealing that the murder weapon is just a normal E-string. They then interrogate the bartender from the nights of the abductions, who leads them to a man called "The Worm" (Aaron Paul), who responds hesitantly. Both of them think he is the killer given that he has a guitar. Veronica, Mac, and Wallace invite themselves over and crash Madison Sinclair's 09er party. Mac looks around the house and meets her biological sister (Carlie Westerman), with whom she connects. The new deputy, Leo, tells Keith and Sheriff Lamb that "The Worm's" guitar strings match the strings which were used to strangle the victims. Veronica ingratiates herself with Leo and steals the Crimestopper recordings from the Lily Kane murder files with the help of Weevil (Francis Capra). Veronica listens to the tapes she stole, and doesn't find anything until she hears a suspicious synthesized voice. Keith and Sheriff Lamb talk to "The Worm", who had photographed both the victims. "The Worm" demands a lawyer. Veronica contacts Mac about the synthesized voice and tells her that there was a reason why she was not switched back to the right parents.

Mac goes to Madison Sinclair's house under the guise of looking for her purse. Meanwhile, a woman runs screaming into the Sheriff's department reporting her missing daughter. Keith tracks Veronica out of fear for her. He finds Veronica with Deputy Leo and his rock band and tells her about the new missing girl. Keith and Leo break into the guitar shop, which has a soundproof recording room, and find the missing girl and the killer, the store clerk from before. Mac tells Veronica that she decoded the message. Veronica eventually says that she knows whose voice it is. Mac sees her biological mom waiting in the car outside with tears in her eyes. She puts her hand on the window and touches her mom's hand before her mom drives away. It turns out that the voice belongs to Clarence Wiedman, the man who took the surveillance photos of Veronica. Veronica takes pictures of Wiedman and his family and sends them to him as a message.

== Cultural references ==
Many cultural references are made in the episode:

- The title of the episode is a direct reference to the novel The Silence of the Lambs by Thomas Harris
- Madison's parents send her a string quartet which plays "Birthday" for her birthday.
- Veronica mentions Rod Serling.
- Sheriff Lamb compares the E-String Strangler case to the Hillside Strangler murders, a real life incident in which two men strangled tens of girls to death.
- Veronica references the Internet Movie Database.
- Keith is surprised that Sheriff Lamb has never seen This Is Spinal Tap.
- Mac and Veronica mention Fievel Mousekewitz, a character in the 1986 animated film An American Tail.
- Mac's blood sister is reading The Westing Game.
- Mac derides Madison's art appreciation by saying that she wouldn't recognize Claude Monet's Water Lilies unless Revlon created and named a nail polish after it.
- Keith and Sheriff Lamb decide whether or not to play "Good cop/bad cop" with their suspect.
- Mac's adoptive father references the 2000 memoir A Heartbreaking Work of Staggering Genius.

== Music ==
Several songs are played in the episode:

- "Birthday" by The Beatles
- "Brilliant Sky" by Saybia
- "Fireflies" by Amy Cook
- "The Way You Are" by 46bliss

== Production ==
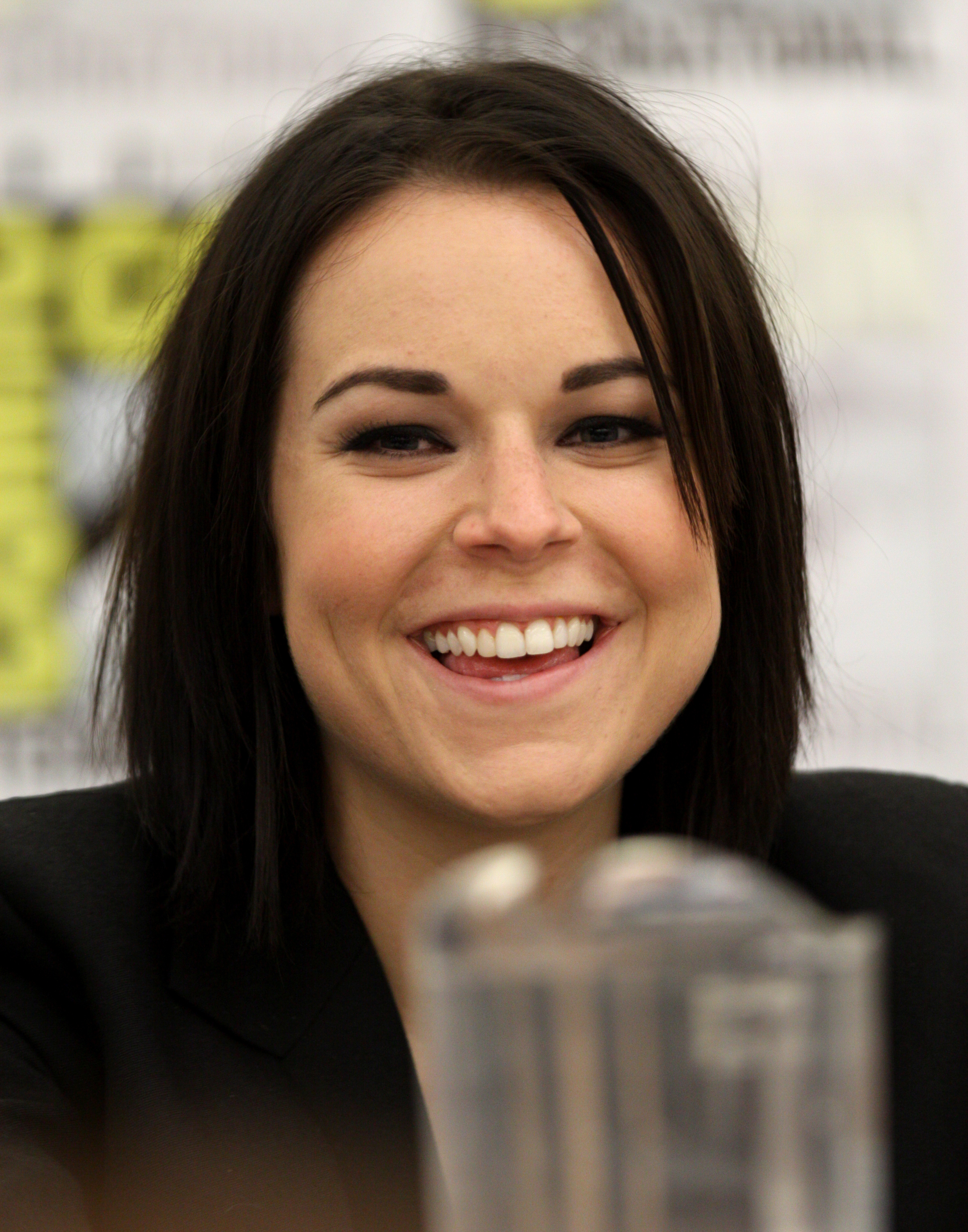
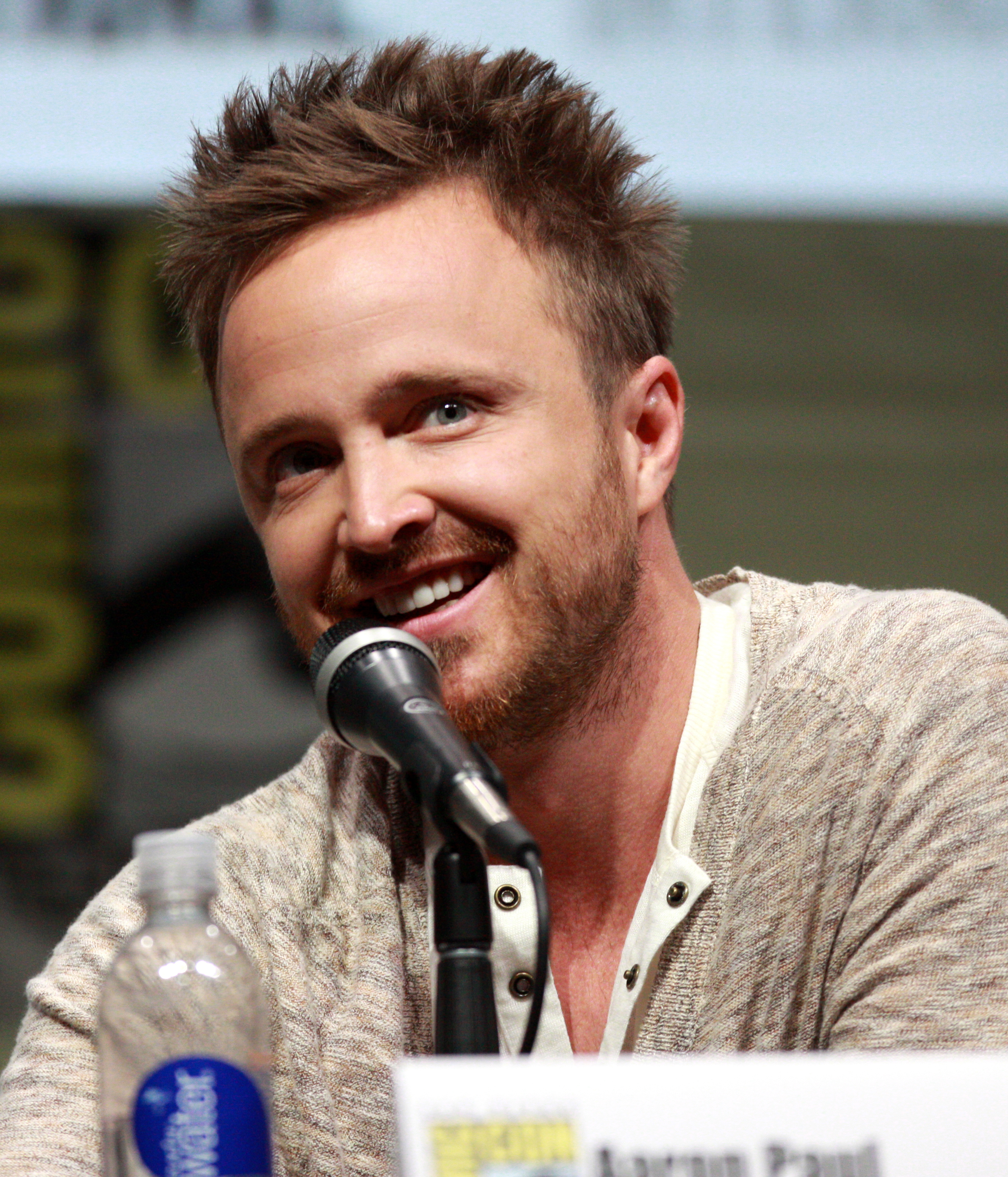
"Silence of the Lamb" featured the second appearance by Tina Majorino's (left) character, Cindy "Mac" Mackenzie, as well as a guest appearance by Aaron Paul (right).

Series regulars Jason Dohring and Teddy Dunn, who play Logan Echolls and Duncan Kane, respectively, do not appear in the episode, despite being credited. This episode is also the first to air in 2005 as opposed to 2004. However, this (and the previous episode) are the only episodes of the series to be aired out of production order. The previous episode, "An Echolls Family Christmas" was produced after this episode, but was aired before, due to "An Echolls Family Christmas" being a Christmas-themed episode which aired as season's final episode of the year in December 2004. In addition, UPN also aired this episode later because executives believed that the material was too dark for the holidays.

The episode's title is a semi-joking reference to the 1991 horror thriller The Silence of the Lambs and the 1988 novel of the same name on which the film was based. The film, the novel, and the episode all deal with serial killers and the brave female detectives who hunt them down (in the case of The Silence of the Lambs, this character is Clarice Starling). Among this episode's guest stars include Tina Majorino, who makes her second appearance on the show (after "Like a Virgin") and Aaron Paul, who would later receive three Primetime Emmy Award wins for his performance as Jesse Pinkman on Breaking Bad.

== Reception ==
=== Ratings ===
In its original broadcast, "Silence of the Lamb" received 2.84 million viewers, ranking 98 of 107 in the weekly rankings. This episode's rating marked an increase of almost 1 million viewers from the previous episode, An Echolls Family Christmas.

=== Reviews ===
Price Peterson of TV.com wrote positively of the episode. In his episode verdict, the reviewer wrote, "that driveway scene between Mac and her birth mom was some great television, and the serial killer plot line was surprisingly intense for this show…Fortunately both plot lines were balanced pretty well. Great episode." Television Without Pity gave the episode a "B+".

Rowan Kaiser, writing for The A.V. Club, gave the episode a more mixed review, mainly criticizing the plot involving Veronica and Mac. "Veronica's plot, on the other hand, is the one that zigs where it should zag. Or to be more accurate, it neither zigs nor zags when it could have done either." However, the reviewer also wrote that "What Mac's story does is create a fulfilling emotional arc for Mac."
