= Clash of the Tritons =

- Veronica Mars episode
- Lynn Echolls's (Lisa Rinna) car is found off the road on a bridge, hinting that she committed suicide.
- Episode no.: Season 1 Episode 12
- Directed by: David Barrett
- Written by: Phil Klemmer; Aury Wallington
- Production code: 2T5711
- Original air date: January 11, 2005

Guest appearances
- Lisa Rinna as Lynn Echolls; Michael Muhney as Don Lamb; Daran Norris as Cliff McCormack; J.D. Pardo as Rick; Paula Marshall as Rebecca James; Harry Hamlin as Aaron Echolls

Episode chronology
← Previous "Silence of the Lamb"	Next → "Lord of the Bling"
- Veronica Mars season 1

"Clash of the Tritons" is the twelfth episode of the first season of the American mystery television series Veronica Mars. Co-written by Phil Klemmer and Aury Wallington and directed by David Barrett, the episode premiered on UPN on January 11, 2005.

The series depicts the adventures of Veronica Mars (Kristen Bell) as she deals with life as a high school student while moonlighting as a private detective. In this episode, Veronica is framed for creating fake IDs, and she sets out to find out who the culprit is. Meanwhile, the school guidance counselor, Rebecca James, interviews the people who were most affected by Lilly Kane's (Amanda Seyfried) murder, and Logan's (Jason Dohring) family dramas continue.

== Synopsis ==
School counselor Rebecca James (Paula Marshall), who used to date Keith, has gotten Veronica to come in for a grief therapy session because of a study she is doing. During the session, Veronica plants a stapler with a microphone on the desk. Meanwhile, Sheriff Lamb questions a student, Rick (J.D. Pardo), on his fake IDs. When questioned further, Rick says that Veronica made the IDs, although she did not. During a locker check, Sheriff Lamb (Michael Muhney) finds blank fake IDs spilling out of her locker, as well as four in her purse. Veronica is arrested and taken down to the station. At the station, Veronica confronts Rick. Rick says that an unspecified "they" forced him to blame Veronica. Later, Logan walks through the hallway and faces scorn and stares from the other students because of the incident with his father. Weevil (Francis Capra) talks to Rebecca while Veronica listens through her car radio. Rebecca shows proof that Weevil and Lilly were dating. Veronica wonders why Lilly didn't tell Veronica about her relationship with Weevil. Veronica meets with Rick in secret, and Rick tells her that a secret society called the Tritons decided to blame her. He is a recent inductee who was trying to get on their good side. Rick also tells Veronica that Duncan (Teddy Dunn) is part of the group.

Veronica puts a tracker on Duncan's car. Logan is suspended for a fight that broke out in school. Keith (Enrico Colantoni) and Cliff (Daran Norris) tell Veronica that Rick's friend Tim's family is suing Veronica and Keith because they believe that Veronica created the fake IDs. Later, Wallace tells Veronica that he heard that a mystery locker at school dispenses fake IDs if the participant pays $250. Veronica positions a camera in order to watch the locker 24/7. Rebecca talks to Logan, and Veronica hears over the radio. Logan says that he blames Veronica for Lilly's death. Veronica and Wallace track Duncan to a mysterious location, which turns out to be a club. Veronica finds Duncan and asks him who the leader is, but he doesn't give anything up. Soon afterwards, Duncan brings Veronica a message from "The Great Triton," and she has to do karaoke onstage in order to elicit a response from the Triton leader. After the song, she meets with the supposed leader, but it is actually an impostor who reveals that a prank has been played on Veronica. Meanwhile, Rick has become targeted by the Tritons, who threaten him. Veronica hears Duncan's conversation with Rebecca. Duncan states that he has forgotten the days leading up to Lilly's murder.

Veronica is abducted and locked in her trunk. After being rescued by Wallace, she hears a Triton chant through her car radio. Veronica goes into the school and sees a ritualistic initiation meeting. She reveals herself and snaps a few photos. The Tritons give chase, but Veronica escapes before they can catch her. Veronica tries to match one of the Tritons to a person who operated the mystery locker, but finds nothing. Veronica visits Sheriff Lamb and makes him a deal—if she doesn't catch the thief by that day, she will plead guilty to any charges. She then asks Lamb to put a student's name into a locker and see what happens. Logan's parents have an argument that becomes increasingly heated before Logan blows up at his dad. Rick goes down to the station and Veronica explains the situation. Rick has been collecting the money from the locker through a hatch. He has been running his own fake IDs, and blamed the Tritons because he was angry at them for not asking him to join. When Veronica asks Rick why he blamed her, he states that it was because Keith's investigations made his family lose money and his parents get a divorce. Meanwhile, we hear a police report that Logan's mother, Lynn (Lisa Rinna), has just committed suicide.

== Arc significance ==
- During Rebecca James' grief counseling sessions, Logan confesses that he and Lilly Kane were broken up when she died and it was because Veronica saw him kissing someone else.
- Weevil also confesses, during a grief counseling session, that he had secretly dated Lilly, but she had gone back to Logan.
- During Duncan's session, he says that he blacked out for three days after Lilly's murder and can't remember anything about it. He mentions his medication, leading Veronica to wonder about what is wrong with him.
- After Aaron finds out his wife, Lynn, was the one giving him bad press, he threatens her with divorce. Later, her car shows up on a bridge and it is implied that she committed suicide.

== Music ==
The following music can be heard in the episode:

- "All They Ever Do Is Talk" by Earlimart
- "Army Of One" by Adam Hamilton
- "One Way or Another" by Blondie (sung by Kristen Bell as a karaoke song)
- "Feel So Free" by Ivy

== Cultural references ==
A variety of cultural references are made in the episode:

- Veronica jokingly wonders whether the principal is looking for Al Capone or the Lindbergh baby in her locker.
- Wallace calls Veronica "La Femme Veronica", which references the 1990 action-thriller film Nikita.
- The episode references John Shaft.
- Wallace compares his basketball skills to that of Michael Jordan.
- Wallace talks to Veronica about Dave Chappelle.
- Aaron complains to Logan that the press surrounding his personal life is making him look like Kevin Costner.

== Production ==
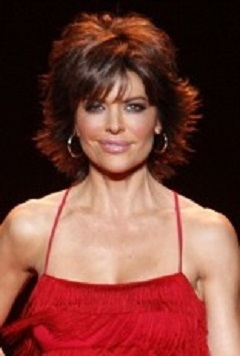
Recurring guest star Lisa Rinna makes her last appearance in this episode after her character, Lynn Echolls, is killed off.

This episode was co-written by Aury Wallington and Phil Klemmer. "Clash of the Tritons" is the second writing credit for the series for both screenwriters. Wallington had previously written "Like a Virgin", while Klemmer had co-written "Return of the Kane". The episode's title refers to the fantasy adventure film Clash of the Titans, and its related media. Actor Harry Hamlin, who portrays Aaron Echolls in the series, played a starring role in the original 1981 film. This episode also features the last appearance of recurring character Lynn Echolls, portrayed by Lisa Rinna, after her character is killed off under mysterious circumstances that imply suicide.

== Reception ==
=== Ratings ===
In its original broadcast, the episode was viewed by 2.91 million viewers, ranking 100 of 112 in the weekly rankings.

=== Reviews ===
Upon airing, the episode received positive reviews. Television Without Pity gave the episode an "A+," its second such rating for the series, after "An Echolls Family Christmas". Price Peterson, writing for TV.com, wrote in his episode verdict that "Despite the increasingly weird behavior of this school's in-crowd, Veronica's fearless takedown of a very feared club was a thrill to watch."

Rowan Kaiser of The A.V. Club praised the episode. "I'm very happy to see that Veronica Mars is maintaining the comedy/drama mix that it managed to get just right in "An Echolls Family Christmas". “Clash of the Tritons” isn't quite as great a piece of character work as the Christmas episode, but it's as or more fun." However, the reviewer criticized the case-of-the-week. "The case itself…is a bit of a trifle and the final result ascribes too much forethought to the culprit."
