= The Girl Next Door (Veronica Mars) =

- Veronica Mars episode
- Episode no.: Season 1 Episode 7
- Directed by: Nick Marck
- Story by: Jed Seidel
- Teleplay by: Jed Seidel; Diane Ruggiero
- Production code: 2T5706
- Original air date: November 9, 2004

Guest appearances
- Amanda Seyfried as Lilly Kane; Jessica Chastain as Sarah Williams; Adam Kaufman as André; Steven Williams as Mr. Daniels; Bonita Friedericy as Evelyn Bugby; Eve Gordon as Emily; Cameron Bender as Nathan; Deborah Zoe as Joanna

Episode chronology
← Previous "Return of the Kane"	Next → "Like a Virgin"
- Veronica Mars season 1

"The Girl Next Door" is the seventh episode of the first season of the American mystery television series Veronica Mars. Co-written by Jed Seidel and Diane Ruggiero and directed by Nick Marck, the episode premiered on UPN on November 9, 2004.

The series depicts the adventures of Veronica Mars (Kristen Bell) as she deals with life as a high school student while moonlighting as a private detective. In this episode, Veronica looks into the mysterious disappearance of her neighbor, Sarah (Jessica Chastain). Meanwhile, Logan (Jason Dohring) and Weevil (Francis Capra) have to deal with each other in detention.

== Synopsis ==
The episode begins in medias res. Veronica sits outside of an apartment building, and we see a stretcher being carried off. Through voiceovers, Veronica tells that she was in some way connected to the crime. The episode then flashes back to one week earlier. Then, Veronica meets Sarah, a heavily pregnant neighbor, who asks her for help with a missing journal that she believes her boyfriend stole. In newspaper class, Mallory Dent (Sydney Tamiia Poitier) shows a woman, Evelyn Bugby (Bonita Friedericy) to Veronica and asks for her help with a project on the class of '79. She eventually agrees to help with the project. Veronica looks through the old yearbook and sees a photo of her mother, Lianne. During a test, a teacher, Mr. Daniels (Steven Williams) fails both Logan and Weevil for talking. They are placed in detention, during which the two bicker and eventually play poker. The teacher comes in and sentences them to a full week of detention. Veronica returns home and views Sarah and her boyfriend, André (Adam Kaufman), arguing. That night, Veronica is awakened by a woman's scream overhead and a body falling. The next morning, Veronica goes to Sarah's door to take her to a doctor's appointment, but there is no response. She looks through the window to see the room in disarray, and Sarah's dog alone, barking.

In the bathroom one day, another student talks to Weevil, and it is heavily implied that Weevil was carrying out an affair with Lilly Kane. Veronica talks to Duncan (Teddy Dunn) about something she found in the yearbook—that Veronica's mother, Lianne (Corrine Bohrer) and Jake Kane (Kyle Secor) were once a couple in high school. A flashback details Veronica's breakup with Duncan, which was abrupt and mystified Veronica. At Sarah's workplace, her boss says that he doesn't know where Sarah is either. He also gives Veronica the information that she fights with her boyfriend a lot. Veronica goes to find André. She questions him, but he dismisses it as a simple fight and nothing serious. She doesn't believe him, and these suspicions are heightened when it turns out that André is painting a portrait of a female nude who is not Sarah. Veronica sneaks into Sarah's apartment and finds some mysterious things, including Sarah's phone and a gun. André comes in and finds Veronica. She manages to escape with minimal conflict. In another flashback, Veronica asks Lilly Kane (Amanda Seyfried) why Duncan broke up with her, but she is vague and unspecific. In detention, Weevil states that he has a plan to get the teacher back, which involves stealing the teacher's car and putting it on the flagpole.

Weevil is told by the principal that he is expelled in the aftermath of the prank. After Veronica gives Sarah's parents Keith's card, they visit Keith. Afterwards, Keith tells Veronica that he does not want her on the case. However, she convinces him otherwise as long as she stays away from André. She finds out that Sarah's baby is not André's. Logan confesses to the prank as well. Veronica visits Sarah's boss again, and she finds out from the boss that Sarah was raped and that the baby might be the child of the rapist. Veronica calls Weevil's motorcycle gang, and they come in order to convince the boss to give Veronica Sarah's journal, which he stole. This works successfully. Weevil is un-expelled and they are both sentenced to a punishment of removing graffiti. Logan notices that Weevil has a tattoo with Lilly's name in it, but Weevil claims it is not because he was involved with her before her death. Veronica reads Sarah's notebook and upon visiting a beach highlighted in the journal, finds Sarah there near her parked car. Sarah goes back to André.

Over dinner, Keith muses that Andre must truly care for Sarah as a man who would help a mother raise a child who is not his own. The comment makes Veronica suddenly wonder if this assessment might possibly describe Keith as well, given the recent revelation that her own mother had been deeply attached to Jake Kane decades before. She snaps out of her reverie when Keith continues his conversation to wonder who the true father of Sarah's baby could be. Meanwhile, upstairs Sarah's mother finds out that she was raped, with the actual father of the child being Sarah's stepfather. Keith and Veronica come and help, and Keith ends up shooting and wounding the stepfather to protect Sarah. We then return to the point at which the episode began.

== Arc significance ==
- While gathering information on the Class of '79 reunion, Veronica finds out that her mom and Jake Kane dated in high school.
- In a flashback, Veronica asks Lilly to find out why Duncan broke up with her. The next day, Lilly had apparently found something out and tells Veronica to forget Duncan and move on.
- Vice Principal Clemmons tells Logan to remind his father the offer he made about donating his boots from one of his hit movies to the school.
- Logan finds out that Weevil has a tattoo of "Lilly". When questioned, Weevil says that his sister's name is Lilly.
- Weevil and Logan put their English teacher's car on the flagpole. Only Weevil gets in trouble (he gets expelled), and later on, Logan admits to Clemmons that he was an accomplice. Clemmons lowers the punishment and brings Weevil back to the school.

== Music ==
In addition to the series' theme song, "We Used to Be Friends", by The Dandy Warhols, the following music can be heard in the episode:

- "The Trial of the Century" by French Kicks
- "La Femme D'Argent" by Air
- "Yellow Butta Sunshine" by Pop

== Production ==
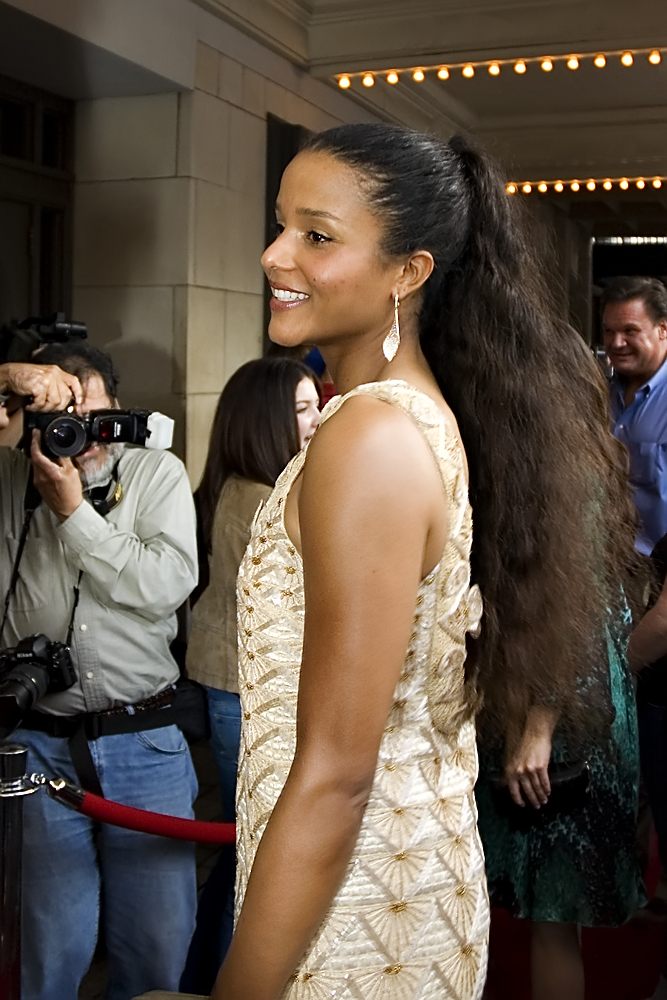
"The Girl Next Door" features the final regular appearance of actress Sydney Tamiia Poitier (pictured), who portrayed Mallory Dent.

This episode is the final episode for actress Sydney Tamiia Poitier, who portrayed Mallory Dent in a total of four episodes. Her abrupt departure from the show was due to her pregnancy in real life. She continued to be credited as starring until the ninth episode of the first season, "Drinking the Kool-Aid". In addition, series regular Percy Daggs III, who portrays Wallace Fennel, is absent from "The Girl Next Door".

Among the episode's many guest stars is Jessica Chastain, who would later rise to fame with her performances in The Tree of Life, Interstellar, The Martian and It Chapter Two, her Oscar-nominated roles in The Help and Zero Dark Thirty, and her Oscar-winning role in The Eyes of Tammy Faye. Another one of the episode's guest stars is Adam Kaufman, whom series creator Rob Thomas later called on to play an unconnected FBI agent role in the unaired fourth season pilot of the show before Veronica Mars was cancelled altogether.

== Reception ==
=== Ratings ===
In its original broadcast, "The Girl Next Door" was watched by 2.74 million viewers, marking a slight drop from the previous episode, "Return of the Kane". The episode ranked 100 of 103 in the weekly rankings.

=== Reviews ===
The episode received a lukewarm critical reaction. Price Peterson of TV.com wrote in his episode verdict, "I gotta admit, I found the main plot more interesting than the case of the week. Not my favorite episode, but still totally watchable." Television Without Pity gave the episode a "B−".

In a fairly negative review, Rowan Kaiser, writing for The A.V. Club, commented negatively on both the case of the week and the B-story. She wrote, "The whole thing also had the negative effect of making Veronica seem passive. As a character, this is probably her least interesting episode." However, the reviewer went on to praise the C-story involving Weevil and Logan, stating that, "On the bright side, the C-plot, involving Weevil and Logan in detention together, is simply magical, and makes the whole episode worthwhile." TVLine ranked "The Girl Next Door" as the worst episode of the series, placing it last on its ranking of all Veronica Mars episodes.
