= An Echolls Family Christmas =

- Veronica Mars episode
- Episode no.: Season 1 Episode 10
- Directed by: Nick Marck
- Written by: Diane Ruggiero
- Production code: 2T5710
- Original air date: December 14, 2004

Guest appearances
- Lisa Rinna as Lynn Echolls; Lisa Thornhill as Celeste Kane; Kevin Sheridan as Sean Friedrich; Travis Schuldt as Connor Larkin; Emmanuelle Vaugier as Monica Hadwin; Harry Hamlin as Aaron Echolls; Kyle Secor as Jake Kane

Episode chronology
← Previous "Drinking the Kool-Aid"	Next → "Silence of the Lamb"
- Veronica Mars season 1

"An Echolls Family Christmas" is the tenth episode of the first season of the American mystery television series Veronica Mars. Written by Diane Ruggiero and directed by Nick Marck, the episode premiered on UPN on December 14, 2004.

The series depicts the adventures of Veronica Mars (Kristen Bell) as she deals with life as a high school student while moonlighting as a private detective. In this episode, Veronica investigates when someone steals Logan's (Jason Dohring) money at a poker game. Meanwhile, Keith investigates a mysterious person who is stalking Aaron Echolls (Harry Hamlin). Despite ranking low in the ratings and marking a season low in terms of number of viewers, the episode was critically lauded.

== Synopsis ==
Veronica and Keith decorate their Christmas tree. Meanwhile, Duncan (Teddy Dunn) dances around drunkenly at a poker party with Logan, Weevil (Francis Capra), and two others, Sean (Kevin Sheridan) and Connor (Travis Schuldt). Weevil wins $5,000 from Logan when they both go all in. However, when Logan opens his money box, he finds that the money is missing. Weevil grows angry and asks each of the other members for $1,000. The next day at school, Duncan confronts Weevil, who stole his laptop. Veronica approaches him, and Duncan tells her about his problem. Duncan tells Veronica that his computer contains some private information regarding their past relationship. Veronica asks Weevil for the computer back, but he refuses. Weevil explains why he was at the card game and says that Logan had an opportunity to hide the money during the game. Logan's mother, Lynn (Lisa Rinna), visits Keith and tells him about threatening letters that a mysterious person sent to her husband. Later, Veronica talks to Duncan, who gives his side of the story. Duncan also blames Logan. Later, Duncan confronts Logan about stealing the money, but he refuses to give any details. When Keith visits the Echolls' house, he finds a pumpkin outside their front door with Aaron's face on it and a knife through it. Veronica stops by the Echolls' house and talks to Logan, and he says that he thinks that Connor stole the money.

Veronica visits Connor's movie set, and she questions him about the poker game. However, he does not know who could have stolen the money. Veronica attempts to visit Sean, but his father turns her away. After deducing that the pumpkin probably has something to do with a halloween encounter or incident, Keith goes to the caterer of the party Aaron was at that day. The caterer tells him that Aaron was having an affair at that party. The next day, Veronica talks to Sean, who tells her that he thinks that Weevil stole the money. Keith talks to Aaron, who admits to the affair and says that it was with his agent's wife, Monica Hadwin (Emmanuelle Vaugier). Veronica frets about Duncan's diary before she makes a deal with Logan: he will host another poker game so Veronica can determine who the thief is. At the poker game, Veronica reveals her findings: Duncan was faking being drunk in order to win the money, not steal it, Connor was simply using a muscle enhancer, and Logan is not the thief because he had tossed his room, and Veronica figures that if he hid the money, he wouldn't tear apart his room looking for it. So, having narrowed the suspects to Sean and Weevil, Veronica reveals that Sean's father was not the owner, but the butler at the palatial home he resides in, and so actually did need the money. Sean stuffed the money into the wide-mouthed beer bottles he'd been drinking from and picked it up the next morning with the recycling. Sean and Weevil go off by themselves, presumably so Weevil can punish him.

Keith talks to the caterer again and asks her to describe the woman she fired. The poker guests then go to Aaron Echolls' party. Veronica, off by herself, finds Jake Kane and confronts him about the pictures of her taken by his security chief, Clarence Wiedman. Jake screams at her that he doesn't know, and Keith views the scene. Jake then angrily talks to his wife, Celeste (Lisa Thornhill), who actually sent Clarence to take the pictures. The majority of the guests go outside to sing Christmas carols while Aaron is confronted by his stalker, the woman whom the caterer fired. The stalker stabs Aaron, but the other guests do not notice because they aren't there. Keith tackles the stalker, and Lynn calls for an ambulance as Logan looks on, ending the episode on a cliffhanger.

== Arc significance ==
- Veronica confronts Jake Kane at the party about the surveillance photos sent to her mom. Jake denies knowing about them, but leaves while grabbing Celeste and saying, "What did you do?" to her.
- Aaron Echolls is stabbed by a jealous former lover, which results in his wife learning of her husband's infidelity with other women.

== Music ==
In addition to the series' theme song, "We Used to Be Friends", by The Dandy Warhols, the following music can be heard in the episode:

- "Little Bit More" by Tony C. and The Truth
- "Slow Hands" by Interpol
- "Saturday Night" by Ozomatli
- "Camp-Fire" by Starling Electric
- "Little Drummer Boy" by The Dandy Warhols

== Production ==
The episode was written by Diane Ruggiero and directed by Nick Marck. "An Echolls Family Christmas" marks Ruggiero's third writing credit for the series (after "The Wrath of Con" and "The Girl Next Door"). In addition, this episode is Marck's second directing credit for Veronica Mars (after "The Girl Next Door"). All series regulars appear in the episode. Also, recurring characters Aaron and Lynn Echolls as well as Jake and Celeste Kane appear in the episode after not appearing for several episodes. Some fans of the show cite this episode as one of the best episodes of the series as a whole. This (and the following episode) are the only episodes of the series to be aired out of production order. The following episode, "Silence of the Lamb" was produced before this episode, but was aired after, due to "An Echolls Family Christmas" being a Christmas-themed episode which aired as season's final episode of the year in December 2004.

== Reception ==
=== Ratings ===
In its original broadcast, "An Echolls Family Christmas" received 1.90 million viewers, ranking 109th of 111 in the weekly rankings. This episode is the lowest-rated episode of the first season.

=== Reviews ===
The episode was critically acclaimed. In a glowing review, Rowan Kaiser, writing for The A.V. Club, stated that "this episode works at every level: it's tense, it's funny, it's light, it's dark, it stands alone, it builds up the plot, it's plausible, and it's surprising." The reviewer also wrote that "It also allows for some wonderful bits of dramatic irony." She also praised the poker game, the guest stars, Keith's storyline, and the episode's Christmas feel. Television Without Pity gave the episode an "A+," its first such rating for the series.

Price Peterson of TV.com also gave a positive review. In his episode verdict, the reviewer wrote that "This episode WORKED. There are few things better than seeing a bad person get reformed…Plus I just love me a Christmas episode, you know?"
