= Sarah Pia Anderson =

English television and theatre director

- Born: St Albans, UK
- Occupations: Television director, theatre director, professor emerita University of California.
- Years active: 1979–present

Sarah Pia Anderson (born 1952) is an English born television and theatre director, and Professor of Cinema and Digital Media at University of California, Davis.

Her career in the theatre included work for the National Theatre: Rosmersholm, the Royal Shakespeare Company: Mary and Lizzie and the Abbey Theatre: Carthaginians. Her early television work included Prime Suspect 4: Inner Circles (1995), starring Dame Helen Mirren.

She has worked mainly in the United States since the mid-1990s, directing episodes of E.R, Gilmore Girls, Dead Like Me, Grey's Anatomy, Veronica Mars and other series. In 2011, she directed the opening episodes of Scott & Bailey produced by RED Production Company for ITV1. Her recent work includes opening episodes of Sneaky Pete (Amazon), Berlin Station (Epix), This Is Us (NBC), Truth Be Told (Apple) and The L-Word:Generation Q (Showtime).

== Television directing credits ==
- Alert: Missing Persons Unit (TV series)
- Tommy (TV series)
- The L Word: Generation Q (TV series)
- Truth Be Told (miniseries)
- Good Girls (TV series)
- Awake (TV series)
- Scott & Bailey (TV series)
- Dead Like Me (TV series)
- Big Love (TV series)
- Ugly Betty (TV series)
- Huff (TV series)
- Veronica Mars (TV series) (Episode: "Return of the Kane")
- Grey's Anatomy (TV series)
- Ed (TV series)
- Ally McBeal (TV series)
- Dark Angel (TV series)
- The Division (TV series)
- Gilmore Girls (TV series)
- Plastic Man (TV series)
- Profiler (TV series)
- ER (TV series)
- Prime Suspect 4: Inner Circles (1995) (TV film)
- Doctor Finlay (TV series)
- Alleyn Mysteries (TV series)
- Pity in History (1985) (TV film)
- A Woman Calling (1984) (TV film)
- Summer's Awakening (1983) (TV film)
