= Like a Virgin (Veronica Mars) =

- Veronica Mars episode
- Veronica Mars (Kristen Bell) sobs after Abel Koontz (Christian Clemenson) tells her that she is probably not Keith's (Enrico Colantoni) biological daughter.
- Episode no.: Season 1 Episode 8
- Directed by: Guy Bee
- Written by: Aury Wallington
- Production code: 2T5707
- Original air date: November 23, 2004

Guest appearances
- Daran Norris as Cliff McCormack; Alona Tal as Meg Manning; Tina Majorino as Cindy "Mac" Mackenzie; Anastasia Baranova as Lizzie Manning; Joel Bissonnette as Jeremy Masterson; Erica Gimpel as Alicia Fennel; Christian Clemenson as Abel Koontz; Daniel Bess as Cole; Annie Abrams as Kimmy; Shanna Collins as Pam

Episode chronology
← Previous "The Girl Next Door"	Next → "Drinking the Kool-Aid"
- Veronica Mars season 1

"Like a Virgin" is the eighth episode of the first season of the American mystery television series Veronica Mars. Written by Aury Wallington and directed by Guy Bee, the episode premiered on UPN on November 23, 2004.

The series depicts the adventures of Veronica Mars (Kristen Bell) as she deals with life as a high school student while moonlighting as a private detective. In this episode, when someone publicly releases the results of an online purity test and causes chaos at the school, Veronica goes on the case. Meanwhile, Veronica attempts to obtain information from the confessed killer of Lilly Kane (Amanda Seyfried), Abel Koontz.

== Synopsis ==
Veronica looks at photos of Lilly Kane's murder site that she found earlier. Cliff McCormack (Daran Norris) enters and Veronica asks for his help to visit Abel Koontz (Christian Clemenson) but Cliff refuses. Veronica sends a letter to Abel, pretending to be a criminology student who wants to interview him.

At school, after gym class, Veronica finds that her clothes have been stolen and stuffed into a toilet. A kind cheerleader, Meg Manning (Alona Tal), loans her uniform to Veronica and then finds her friends at lunch.

Her friends are discussing a popular purity test that has been circulating online. Meg, a virgin, is pleased to hear that her boyfriend scored high on the purity test. Later, Veronica and Wallace (Percy Daggs III) also discuss the test at his home. Wallace's mom, Alicia (Erica Gimpel), isn't pleased to see Veronica and privately discourages Wallace from being friends with her. While on the purity test website, Veronica notes there is an option to buy other people's test results and predicts school will be very interesting the next day.

Chaos erupts at school after people post each other's results on their lockers. Meg's test results are leaked, indicating that she cheated on her boyfriend. Meg swears she never even took the test and Veronica promises to help clear her name. She enlists Mac (Tina Majorino) to help with the case. Mac suggests that Renny DeMoue, the school's IT person, might provide a lead.

Meanwhile, Meg is bullied for the false test results and is heckled during her school musical audition. Meg suggests her sister Lizzie may have entered a false test on her behalf but Lizzie denies it when Veronica interrogates her. Veronica goes to Renny to try to access the student passwords but Renny refuses her.

Alicia is harassed by her tenant Jeremy (Joel Bissonnette) and Wallace sleeps over at Veronica's for peace. Keith offers to help Alicia deal with her tenant but she refuses his help. Jeremy escalates his harassment and turns on the gas at the Fennel home to force the family out. Keith visits Jeremy at night and scares him into moving out and finally leaving the Fennels alone.

At school, Veronica notices Meg isn't at school and goes to visit her home. Meg admits the bullying has become too much for her and asks Veronica how she deals with it. Veronica advises her to "get tough and get even."

With help from Mac, Veronica discovers someone has been logging into Veronica's student account and they sent an email to Duncan while pretending to be Veronica, telling Duncan that she was still in love with him and that she gave him an STD. They also see the imposter was IMing with another person right before class ended. Based on the user name and messages, Veronica pieces together that the imposter was corresponding with Renny. She follows him and catches him having sex with Kimmy (Annie Abrams), a friend of Meg's.

The next day at school, Veronica confronts Kimmy. Kimmy confesses that she asked Renny to give her Meg's password and entered a fake test result to humiliate Meg because Kimmy was jealous of her. She also admits that her friend Pam (Shanna Collins) hacked into Veronica's account because Pam has a crush on Duncan but worries that he still has feelings for Veronica. Veronica reveals she captured their conversation on tape and hands it over to Meg to slip into the morning announcements. Kimmy and Pam are exposed and they turn on each other. Meg thanks Veronica for her help and warns her that people are afraid of her, but that she also has friends.

Veronica tells Duncan that the email Pam sent was fake and he believes her. They part on friendly terms. Similarly, Alicia thanks Keith for his help and agrees that their children can still be friends. Veronica sees Mac driving a new car and realizes that Mac created the purity test website to extract money from her fellow students.

Abel accepts Veronica's visit request but when they meet in person, he recognizes her. He insists that he killed Lily and implies to Veronica that her biological father is actually Jake Kane (Kyle Secor). Shaken, Veronica gets into her car and breaks down sobbing.

== Cultural references ==
A variety of pop culture references are made in the episode:

- The episode's title refers to Madonna's sophomore album Like a Virgin and its lead single of the same name.
- Meg and Kimmy both audition for the lead role of Sally in Cabaret. After Meg's failed audition, Veronica references the title song of the musical.
- It is referenced that Meg was the lead role in Guys and Dolls.
- Cole references the Lewinsky scandal when describing his relationship with Meg, saying, "I did not have sexual relations with that woman."
- Veronica refers to the science fiction comedy film Repo Man.

== Music ==
The following music can be heard in the episode:

- "Hands on the Money" by Kid Symphony
- "Don't Tell Mama" from the musical Cabaret (sung by the characters Meg Manning and Kimmy)
- "Don't Let It Get You Down" by Spoon

== Production ==
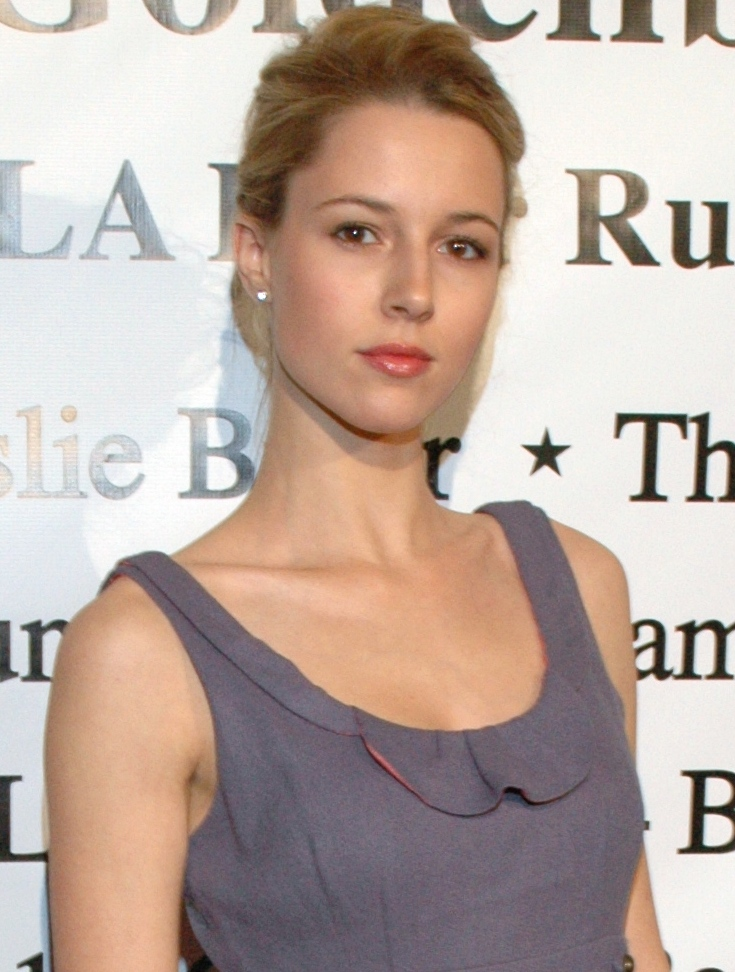
Actress Alona Tal (pictured), was the second choice to play the lead role of Veronica Mars. Rob Thomas created her role of Meg Manning specifically for Tal.

Series regulars Jason Dohring and Francis Capra, who portray Logan Echolls and Weevil Navarro, respectively, do not appear in "Like a Virgin." Although credited, Sydney Tamiia Poitier, who previously played Veronica's journalism teacher, Mallory Dent, does not appear, as her last episode was "The Girl Next Door". In addition, the episode features the first appearance of Cindy "Mac" Mackenzie, who would later become a series regular in the show's third season.

"Like a Virgin" also marks the first appearance of recurring character Meg Manning (Alona Tal), who would appear in ten episodes over the course of the show's first two seasons. During casting, Tal was series creator Rob Thomas's second choice for the character of Veronica Mars (after Kristen Bell). However, Thomas enjoyed Tal's audition so much that he created the character of Meg Manning specifically for her.

== Reception ==
=== Ratings ===
In its original broadcast, the episode was watched by 2.76 million viewers, ranking 92nd of 98 in the weekly rankings, marking a slight increase in viewers from the previous episode, "The Girl Next Door".

=== Reviews ===
The episode received positive reviews from television critics. IGN ranked the episode ninth on its list of "The Top 10 Veronica Mars episodes," stating that, "The moment when Keith gets rid of Alicia's unwanted tenant is about the time you realize that a Keith-focused spinoff could be amazing." Price Peterson, writing for TV.com, lauded the episode, writing that "the high school scandals were fun and surprising, while the Lilly Kane investigation took a turn for the serious." In addition, the reviewer praised the final scene in which Veronica breaks down in the car. "It was the first time we'd seen such a raw display of emotion from our intrepid heroine, so it was as unsettling as it was heartbreaking. Poor Veronica!"

Rowan Kaiser of The A.V. Club, in a mixed review, stated that "As a vehicle for introducing moderately important new characters, [the episode] succeeds." However, the reviewer went on to write that the "major issue is that the plot is absolutely riddled with holes."
