= Return of the Kane =

- Veronica Mars episode
- Veronica (Kristen Bell) and Keith (Enrico Colantoni) prepare to watch Abel Koontz's arrest footage.
- Episode no.: Season 1 Episode 6
- Directed by: Sarah Pia Anderson
- Story by: Rob Thomas
- Teleplay by: Phil Klemmer
- Production code: 2T5705
- Original air date: November 2, 2004

Guest appearances
- Lisa Rinna as Lynn Echolls; Rachel Roth as Wanda Varner; Amanda Seyfried as Lilly Kane; Jane Lynch as Mrs. Donaldson; Reginald Ballard as Homeless Vet; Harry Hamlin as Aaron Echolls; Kyle Secor as Jake Kane; Amanda Noret as Madison Sinclair

Episode chronology
← Previous "You Think You Know Somebody"	Next → "The Girl Next Door"
- Veronica Mars season 1

"Return of the Kane" is the sixth episode of the first season of the American mystery television series Veronica Mars. The episode's teleplay was written by Phil Klemmer, with story by series creator Rob Thomas and was directed by Sarah Pia Anderson. The episode premiered on UPN on November 2, 2004.

The series depicts the adventures of Veronica Mars (Kristen Bell) as she deals with life as a high school student while moonlighting as a private detective. In this episode, Veronica investigates a potentially rigged student election after her ex-boyfriend Duncan Kane (Teddy Dunn) wins over more popular candidate Wanda Varner (Rachel Roth). Meanwhile, Logan faces the consequences of running an illegal boxing ring which brutally pits homeless people against each other, and Veronica investigates Lilly Kane's (Amanda Seyfried) murder further.

== Synopsis ==
Logan (Jason Dohring) finds a mob of paparazzi waiting for him in the morning one day. He makes snide remarks, telling them to leave, but his movie star father, Aaron Echolls (Harry Hamlin), arrives and welcomes them. Meanwhile, Duncan (Teddy Dunn) talks to his father Jake (Kyle Secor) about running for school president. In addition, a cheerleader sees another girl, Wanda (Rachel Roth), get her food delivered, and she confronts journalism teacher Mallory Dent (Sydney Tamiia Poitier) about the problem. Eventually, a fight ensues between Wanda and the cheerleader. Veronica says she used to be in pep squad with Wanda. At dinner that day, Keith and Veronica see on the news that the convicted murderer of Lilly Kane (Amanda Seyfried), Abel Koontz, has fired his legal defense counsel. In newspaper class the next day, Veronica is tasked with covering the school election just as she sees that Wanda is running. Logan tells Duncan he should run.

Later, Veronica interviews Wanda. She gives some politically charged responses, speaking out against the rich students and status quo. Duncan sees an ad for his presidential run on the school TV. The video is voiced by Logan's father and seems to have been created by Logan without Duncan's knowledge. Veronica decides to research more into Lilly's murder. She starts with listing all the suspects: Abel Koontz, Celeste Kane (Lisa Thornhill), Jake, and Duncan. She opens her father's safe and begins to look for clues. That night, Logan runs an illegal boxing ring. The next day, it is announced that Duncan has actually won the presidency, to the shock of the entire school. Veronica announces that "now [she's] got a story," implying that she believes it was rigged.

Later, Veronica talks with another faculty member, Mrs. Donaldson (Jane Lynch), who says that one adult must sign a request for the votes to be recounted. Veronica recruits the journalism teacher, and she accepts. Veronica runs through the ballots with Wallace and Wanda, but they still show a victory for Duncan. However, Veronica finds a ballot of a student who wrote "Wanda Rulez" on his form, but voted for Duncan. Veronica soon finds that the voting instructions for the ballots were different in different rooms. She confronts the principal about this, but he doubts her. It turns out that Madison Sinclair, an 09er girl, made the ballot orders, and Veronica considers the mystery solved. The principal gives in and a run-off is scheduled for that Thursday. That night, Veronica calls an adult reporter to ask him for his copy of a piece he did a few days ago on Abel Koontz.

Jake pressures Duncan to win the election, though their interaction is more tender than other instances. Duncan asks, "What if I find happiness living in a grass hut, carving driftwood figurines for tourists?" Jake responds: "[...] if you're happy and committed to drift woods carving, be the best driftwood carver you can be... After you've graduated from Stanford... Law school... summa cum laude." Duncan laughs and the tension is eased for a moment. The next day, Veronica sees defaced Wanda posters and clean new Duncan posters. Veronica and Wanda decide to hang out and make new posters. In newspaper class, Veronica confronts Duncan about his role in the election, but he doesn't respond. That night, Logan finds his father, who cannot sleep due to the recent press about Logan's homeless boxing ring. On the day of the election, Veronica tries to give Weevil (Francis Capra) a Wanda bumper sticker. Weevil refuses, saying his friend Felix got in trouble for stealing traffic signs after sleeping with Wanda. Soon after, Veronica proposes they go to a rave in the desert, win or lose. Wanda asks if they'll need "provisions," referring to ecstasy, and Veronica lies, saying she knows a dealer. Aaron Echolls tells Logan to deal with the press after the scandal he caused with his underground boxing. On the way to the soup kitchen, a vet calls Logan out for taking advantage of the poor, while his father signs a deal for 8-figures. During the taping, Logan announces that Aaron is donating $500,000 to the Neptune Food Bank. Later that day, Aaron whips Logan with a belt while Logan's mother sits in another room.

Veronica is subject to an emergency locker check, after which she hears that Duncan won the presidency. Veronica realizes Wanda is ratting out other students to clear her record of a drug charge. When Veronica confronts her, Wanda admits to reporting other students because it's her only hope of maintaining a clear record and getting into college. Veronica replies that there are no hard feelings since she didn't vote for Wanda. Later that day, Veronica receives her package from the reporter and starts to lie to Keith about its contents before telling her dad the truth and pleading with him to reopen the case. She shows the footage of Abel Koontz's arrests and the shoes decorated by Veronica that one of the images contains. Keith asks what she thinks those shoes were doing with Abel Koontz, and Veronica responds, "Good question."

== Cultural references ==
A variety of pop culture references are made in the episode:

- Wanda refers to Xanadu, possibly a reference to Charles Foster Kane's mansion in Citizen Kane.
- Wanda refers to Xanadu, possibly a reference as well to the film Xanadu equating blond cheerleader Madison Sinclair with Olivia Newton-John who plays a modern incarnation of Terpsichore, the Greek muse of dance.
- One of Wanda's campaign signs says "Give me liberty or give me death!", quoting Patrick Henry's 1775 speech
- Logan makes a reference to A Fish Called Wanda, a 1988 heist film.
- Logan's father says that Access Hollywood, Entertainment Tonight, and E! have been calling to ask about his son's actions.
- Veronica compares her relationship to her father to the comic strip "Spy vs. Spy" from MAD Magazine.

== Music ==
In addition to the series' theme song, "We Used to Be Friends", by The Dandy Warhols, the following music can be heard in the episode:

- "Still in Love Song" by The Stills
- "Feel Alright" by The Red Onions
- "Bandido" by Daniel Indart
- "I'm In a Way" by The Rite Flyers
- "Ventura Highway" by America

== Production ==
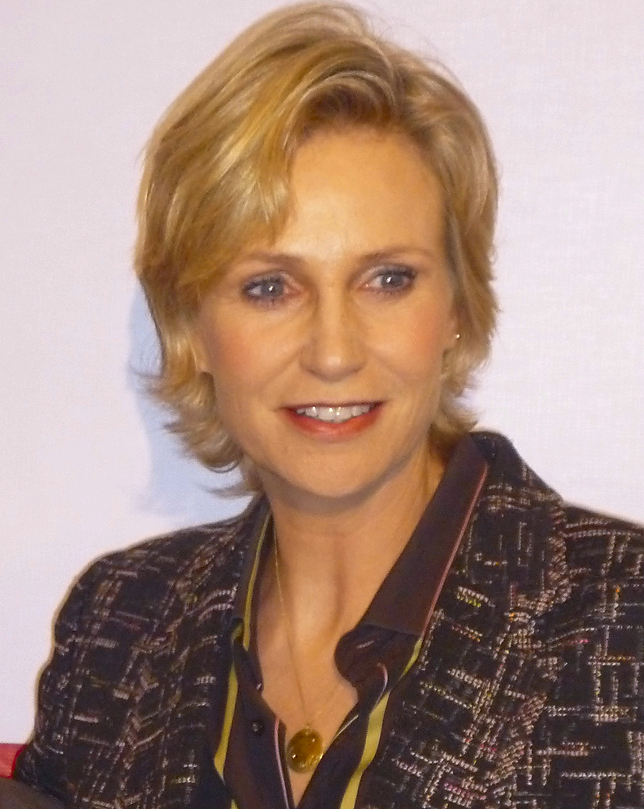
Jane Lynch (pictured) guest starred in "Return of the Kane".

This episode was directed by Sarah Pia Anderson and co-written by series creator Rob Thomas (who wrote the story) and Phil Klemmer (who wrote the teleplay). This episode is the first to be directed by a female director. The episode's title is a joking reference to The Return of the King, the third volume of J.R.R. Tolkien's high fantasy novel The Lord of the Rings, or possibly the 2003 film adaption of it, which was relatively new in that time. Among the episode's guest stars is Jane Lynch, who would eventually find fame on Glee. In addition, a character by the name of Wanda Varner—who appears in a guest starring role in "Return of the Kane"—was featured in Rob Thomas's 1996 young adult novel Rats Saw God. Krysten Ritter originally auditioned for the role of Wanda in the episode. She would later play recurring character Gia Goodman in season 2 and the film adaptation of the show.

== Reception ==
=== Ratings ===
In its original broadcast, the episode was watched by 2.86 million viewers, ranking 104 of 111 in the weekly rankings. This was a slight increase in rating from the previous week's episode, "You Think You Know Somebody".

=== Reviews ===
The episode received mostly positive reviews. Television Without Pity gave the episode a "B+". Rowan Kaiser of The A.V. Club wrote a positive review, stating that the twist involving Wanda at the episode's close did not fall flat because the show had built up enough "goodwill." In addition, the reviewer wrote that the episode "continues its blunt, but smart, take on class in America."

Price Peterson of TV.com wrote in his episode verdict, "The twist that heroic outsider Wanda was not what she seemed was yet another turn I didn't see coming...Another fun and solid episode." IGN ranked the episode 7th on its list of the top ten Veronica Mars episodes, praising the characterization of Logan. "Up to this point, Logan was just a tool and you wanted him to get knocked down. But here, you get a peek at his troubled home life. [...] It was an unexpected layer of depth that helped pave the road towards Logan becoming an appealing character."
