= Diane Ruggiero =

American television writer and producer (born 1970)

Diane Ruggiero-Wright
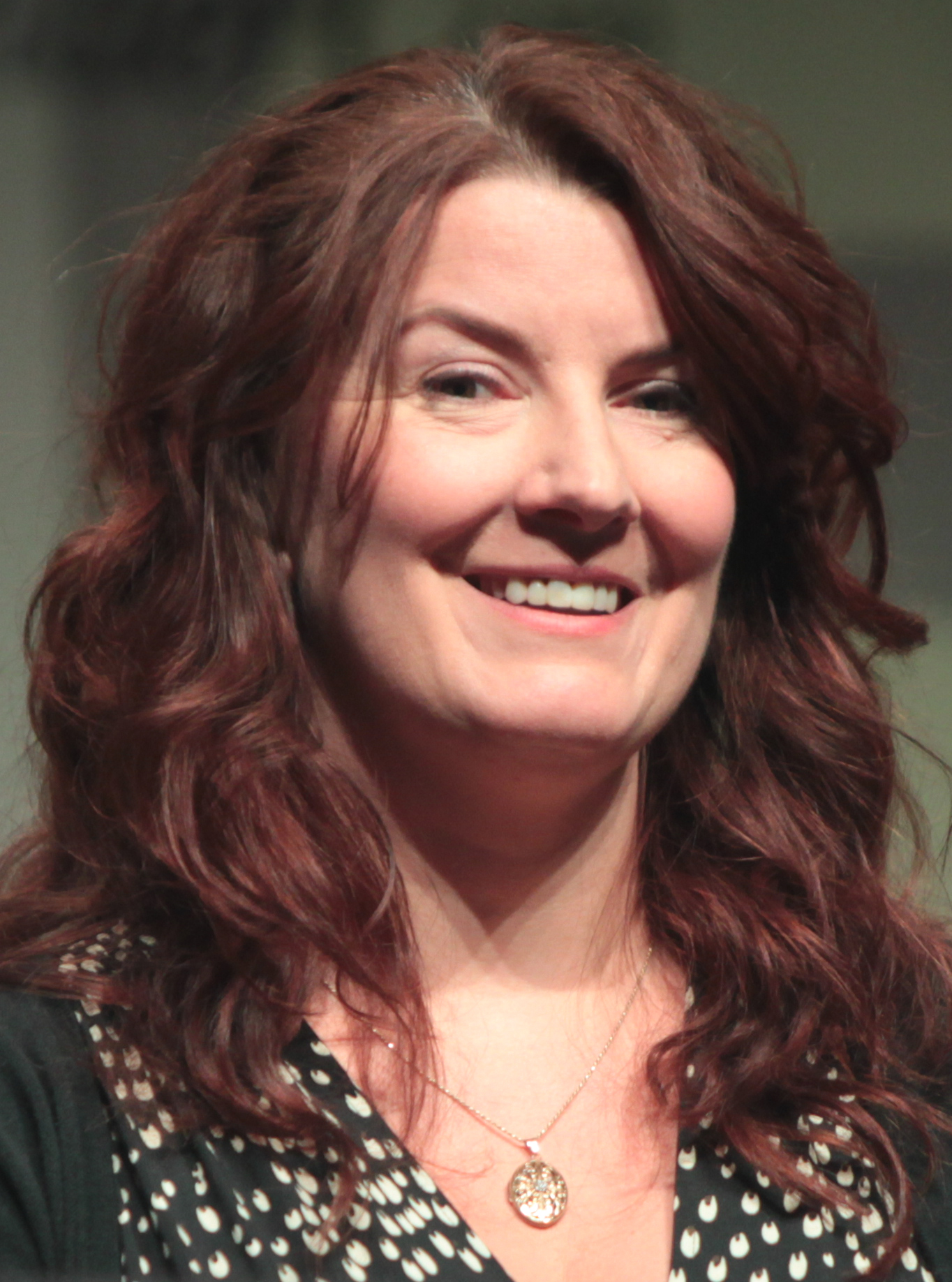
- Ruggiero-Wright at WonderCon in 2015
- Born: Diane Ruggiero-Wright; December 3, 1970 (age 55); Old Bridge, New Jersey, U.S.
- Occupations: Producer, screenwriter
- Years active: 2000–present

Diane Ruggiero-Wright (/ˈruːʒɪəroʊ/ ROO-zheer-oh; born December 3, 1970) is an American television writer and producer. Her credits include That's Life, Veronica Mars, Free Agents, Dirty Sexy Money, Big Shots, the Mythological X remake The Ex List and iZombie, which she co-created with Rob Thomas. With Thomas, she also co-wrote the script for the Veronica Mars film.

Ruggiero is a native of Old Bridge Township, New Jersey. While she was living in North Arlington, New Jersey, Ruggiero's writing talent was discovered by Mark St. Germain while she worked as a waitress at the Park and Orchard restaurant in East Rutherford, New Jersey. She is close friends with Jed Seidel and Rob Thomas.
