= Sydney Tamiia Poitier =

American-Canadian actress (born 1973)

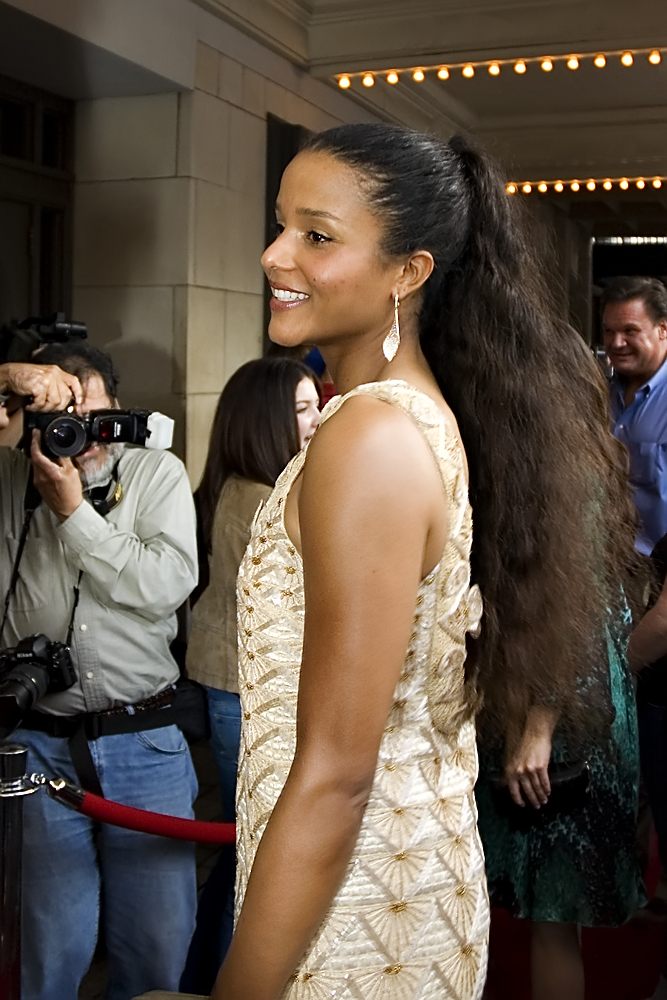
- Poitier at premiere of Grindhouse in Austin, Texas in 2007
- Born: November 15, 1973 (age 52); Los Angeles, California, U.S.
- Other name: Sydney Poitier Heartsong
- Education: New York University; Stella Adler Studio of Acting
- Occupation: Actress
- Years active: 1998–present
- Spouse: Dorian Heartsong (m. 2012)
- Children: 1
- Parents: Sidney Poitier (father); Joanna Shimkus (mother)

Sydney Tamiia Poitier (/ˈpwɑːtjeɪ/ PWAH-tyay; born November 15, 1973) is an American-Canadian television and film actress.

== Early life and family ==
Born in Los Angeles, Poitier is the daughter of Bahamian-American actor Sidney Poitier and Canadian actress Joanna Shimkus. Her mother is of Lithuanian Jewish and Irish Catholic descent. She has an older sister. She also has four older half-sisters from her father's first marriage.

Poitier attended NYU's Tisch School of the Arts where she earned a bachelor's degree in acting. She also studied at Stella Adler Studio of Acting.

Poitier and her husband, musician Dorian Heartsong, have one child together, a daughter born in 2015.

== Career ==
Poitier began her career of acting in the late 1990s. In 2001, she landed her first role on television in the NBC drama series First Years. The series was canceled after three episodes. In 2003, she starred in the UPN sitcom Abby. That series was also canceled during its first season. Later that same year, she had a recurring role in Joan of Arcadia, where she played Rebecca Askew, the love interest of Joan's older brother, Kevin (Jason Ritter). She was also a regular on the first season of Veronica Mars. However, she left the show after only appearing in four episodes because of budget cuts.

In 2007, Poitier starred in Death Proof, director Quentin Tarantino's segment of the movie Grindhouse, as radio DJ Jungle Julia. The next year, she had a co-starring role in the new Knight Rider series, as FBI Agent Carrie Rivai. In 2011, she guest-starred on two episodes of Private Practice.

Poitier starred as Detective Sam Shaw in the Canadian crime comedy series Carter, which ran for two seasons in 2018 and 2019.

== Filmography ==
=== Film ===
Year	Title	Role	Notes
1998	Park Day	Sophia Johnson	
1999	True Crime	Jane March	
2001	MacArthur Park	Linda	
2001	Happy Birthday	Hannah	
2004	The Devil Cats	Hellena Handbasket	
2005	Nine Lives	Vanessa	
2006	Hood of Horror	Wanda	
2007	Death Proof	Jungle Julia	
2007	The List	Cecile	
2008	Blues	Dee	
2008	Knight Rider	Carrie Rivai	
2010	Yard Sale	Kate Butler	Short
2010	Page 36	Miss Gray	Short
2011	Big Tweet	Big Tweet's Girl	Short
2012	The Shooting Star Salesman	Zoey	Short
2013	The Mouseketeer	Dina Gerger	Short
2014	Flawed	Jana Conley	Short
2015	Too Late	Veronica	
2015	Night of the Living Dead: Darkest Dawn	Tami (voice)	
2017	Clinical	Clara	

=== Television ===
Year	Title	Role	Notes
1998	Free of Eden	Nicole Turner	TV film
1999	Noah's Ark	Ruth	TV miniseries
2001	First Years	Riley Kessler	Main role
2003	The Twilight Zone	Dr. Leslie Coburn	"The Placebo Effect"
2003	Abby	Abigail 'Abby' Walker	Main role
2003–04	Joan of Arcadia	Rebecca Askew	Recurring role (season 1)
2004	Veronica Mars	Mallory Dent	"Credit Where Credit's Due", "You Think You Know Somebody", "Return of the Kane", "The Girl Next Door"
2006	Grey's Anatomy	Deborah Fleiss	"17 Seconds"
2008–09	Knight Rider	Carrie Rivai	Main role
2011	Supah Ninjas	Katherine / Katara	"Katara"
2011	Private Practice	Michelle	"Love and Lies", "Step One"
2012	Hawaii Five-0	Grace Tilwell	"I Ka Wa Mamua"
2012	Kendra	Leslie	Web series
2014	Chicago P.D.	Det. Mia Sumners	Recurring role (season 1)
2018	Homecoming	Lydia Belfast	4 episodes Credited as Sydney Poitier-Heartsong.
2018-2019	Carter	Det. Sam Shaw	Main role
2025	Common Side Effects	Cecily (voice)	Recurring role
