= Jed Seidel =

Jed Seidel is an American television producer and screenwriter.

== Credits ==
Seidel's major credits include episodes of Northern Exposure, Deadly Games, Felicity, More, Patience, Black Sash, The Haunting of Sorority Row, Terriers, Hollywood Heights, Nash Bridges, Miss Match, Veronica Mars, Ghost Whisperer, Greek, El don de Alba, and Gilmore Girls.

== Awards and nominations ==
WGA Award
