= Christopher B. Duncan =

American actor

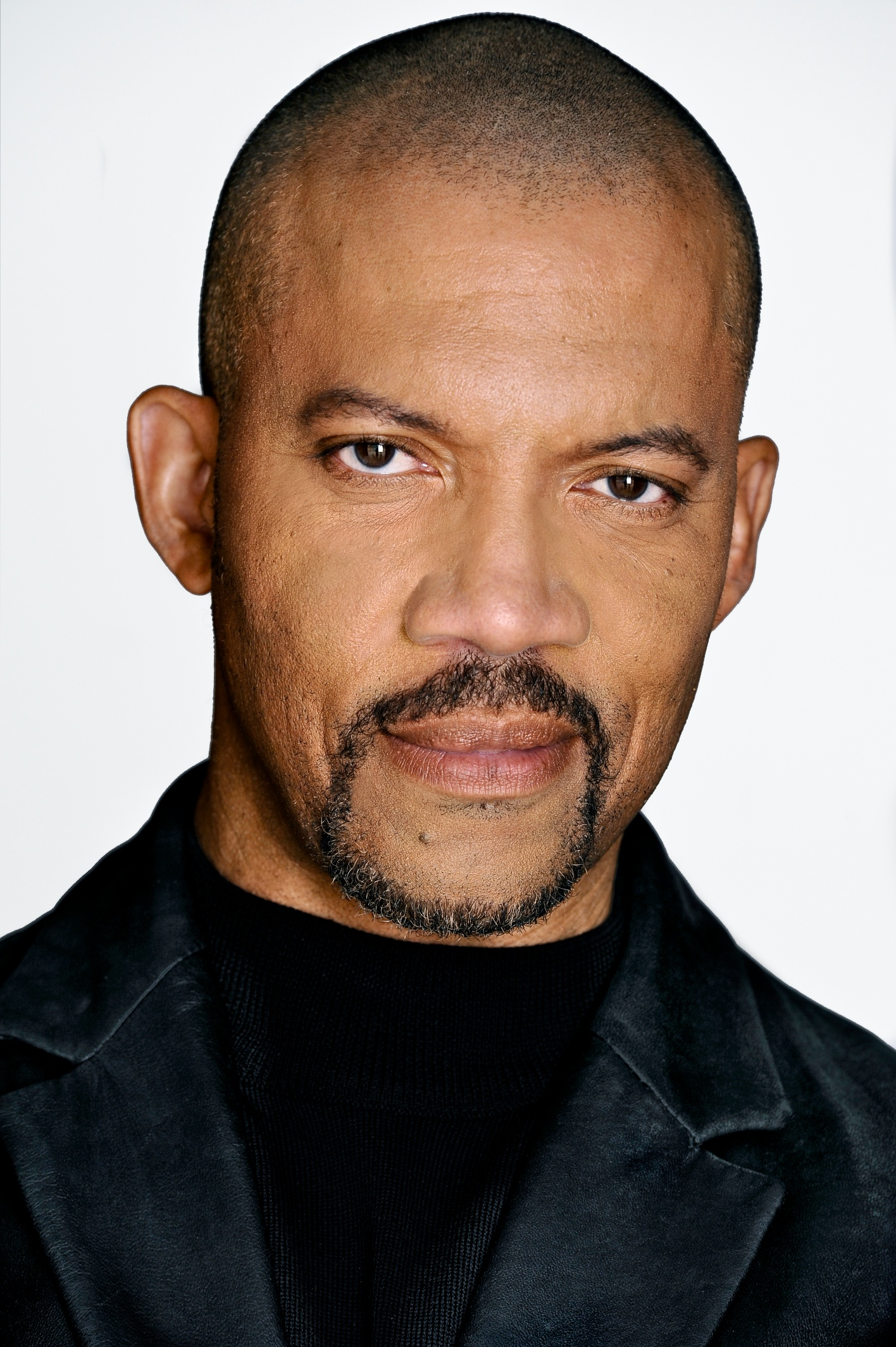
- Occupation: Actor
- Years active: 1989–present

Christopher B. Duncan is an American actor. He is known for his television series regular roles like Braxton P. Hartnabrig on The Jamie Foxx Show, President William Johnson in The First Family, and his portrayal of Clarence Weidman on Veronica Mars.

== Career ==
Duncan had a starring role as Braxton P. Hartnabrig on The Jamie Foxx Show. He played the leading role of President William Johnson in the sitcom The First Family. He also had recurring roles on The Resident, Veronica Mars, Aliens in America, Lincoln Heights, Jane by Design, The District, and Soul Food. He also guest-starred in Martin, iCarly, Rosewood, Castle, NCIS, Bones, Mental, ER, Boston Legal, 24, CSI, and The Practice. He played Barack Obama on The Tonight Show with Jay Leno, as well as in the 2010 film My Name Is Khan.

== Filmography ==
=== Film ===
Year	Title	Role	Notes
1991	Deadly Medicine	–	TV movie
1994	In the Army Now	Soldier #1	
1994	Jack Reed: A Search for Justice	Rookie	TV movie
1996	Original Gangstas	Spyro	
1999	Three Kings	Camp Soldier	
2000	Gedo	Matt	Video
2001	The Elevator	Bruce	TV movie
2003	The Midget Stays in the Picture	A List Actor	Short
2003	A One Color System	Lucas Desmond	Short
2004	Johnson Family Vacation	Stan Turner	
2005	Fair Game	Marcus	
2009	Contradictions of the Heart	Michael	Video
2010	My Name Is Khan	Barack Obama	
2010	Lego Hero Factory: Rise of the Rookies	Dunkan Bulk (voice)	TV movie
2011	Lego Hero Factory: Savage Planet	Dunkan Bulk (voice)	TV movie
2013	Feeding Mr. Baldwin	Lance Bryant	
2013	The Congress	Christopher Ryne	
2017	What About Barb?	Craig Kellog	TV movie
2017	Raptors	Terrance 'T'	
2019	3 from Hell	Glassy Wolf	
2020	Christmas Dilemma	Howard	TV movie

=== Television ===
Year	Title	Role	Notes
1989	Generations	Gordon Williams	Regular Cast
1990	Thirtysomething	Interviewer	Episode: "Control"
1990–95	Coach	Bo Whitley	Recurring Cast: Seasons 3–4, Guest: Season 8
1992	Dream On	Mark	Episode: "Terms of Employment"
1993	Family Matters	Sam 'The Slam'	Episode: "The Way the Ball Bounces"
1993	Martin	Michael	Episode: "The Break Up: Part 3"
1994	Hardball	Palmer Atkins	Recurring Cast
1996	Soul Train	Himself/Guest Host	Episode: "Keith Sweat/Tony! Toni! Tone!/Ginuwine"
1996	Diagnosis: Murder	Bobby Scott	Episode: "X Marks the Murder"
1996–2001	The Jamie Foxx Show	Braxton P. Hartnabrig	Main Cast
1997	Living Single	Paul	Episode: "Swing Out Sisters"
2000	Walker, Texas Ranger	Defense Attorney Lime	Episode: "The Bachelor Party"
2001–02	Soul Food	Bob Wayne	Recurring Cast: Season 2, Guest: Season 3
2001–04	The District	Sergeant Ray Cutter	Recurring Cast: Seasons 2–4
2002	The Practice	F.B.I. Agent	Episode: "Judge Knot"
2002	The Parkers	Curtis King	Episode: "Make a Joyful Noise"
2003	The Proud Family	Mr. Webb (voice)	Episode: "Culture Shock"
2004	CSI: Crime Scene Investigation	George the Fireman	Episode: "Bad Words"
2005	24	Spectre	Episode: "Day 4: 7:00 p.m.–8:00 p.m."
2005	Wanted	Police Officer	Episode: "Ronin"
2005–07	Veronica Mars	Clarence Wiedman	Recurring Cast: Seasons 1–2, Guest: Season 3
2006	CSI: Miami	Carvell Watson	Episode: "Driven"
2006	Criminal Minds	Agent James Sheridan	Episode: "The Last Word"
2007	Shark	Rick Lucas	Episode: "Backfire"
2007	iCarly	Colonel Morgan	Episode: "iRue the Day"
2007–08	Aliens in America	Mr. Matthews	Recurring Cast
2008	Boston Legal	Dr. Jeremy Marley	Episode: "Happy Trails"
2008	Lincoln Heights	Reverend John Kingston	Recurring Cast: Season 3
2008–09	The Tonight Show with Jay Leno	Barack Obama	Recurring Cast: Season 16, Guest: Season 17
2009	ER	Matthew Graham	Episode: "Shifting Equilibrium"
2009	Mental	Detective Paul Bagdonis	Episode: "Coda"
2009	Bones	Arthur Rutledge	Episode: "The Bond in the Boot"
2010	Days of Our Lives	Donald Marcus	Episode: "Episode #1.11244 & #1.11245"
2010–13	Hero Factory	Dunkan Bulk (voice)	Main Cast
2011	Reed Between the Lines	Mr. Harris	Episode: "Let's Talk About Hair"
2012	Jane by Design	Judge Bentley Pope	Recurring Cast
2012	The Avengers: Earth's Mightiest Heroes	Luke Cage (voice)	Recurring Cast: Season 2
2012–15	The First Family	President William Johnson	Main Cast
2012–17	General Hospital	D.A. Joseph Campbell	Regular Cast
2013	Make It Happen	Matt Demon	Episode: "Acting Class"
2014	Switched at Birth	Dr. Trent Larkin	Recurring Cast: Season 3
2014	Play It Again, Dick	Clarence Wiedman	Main Cast
2015	NCIS	Dale Harris	Episode: "The Artful Dodger"
2016	Unsung Hollywood	Himself	Episode: "Fred Williamson"
2016	Castle	Marcus Weller	Episode: "Witness for the Prosecution"
2016	Rosewood	Marcel Crawford	Episode: "Paralytics and Priorities"
2017	Chicago P.D.	Lavar Spann	Episode: "Fagin"
2018	9-1-1	Mr. Cready	Episode: "Worst Day Ever"
2018	Modern Family	Security Guard	Episode: "Written in the Stars"
2019	Legacies	Terrance Greasley	Episode: "The Boy Who Still Has a Lot of Good to Do"
2019	The Resident	Brett Slater	Recurring Cast: Season 2
2019	Veronica Mars	Clarence Wiedman	Episode: "Entering a World of Pain"
2019–20	Black Lightning	Commander Carson Williams	Recurring Cast: Season 3
2020	American Soul	Ray Bradley	Recurring Cast: Season 2
2020–21	Your Honor	Sgt. Joe Corrigan	Recurring Cast: Season 1
2022	First Kill	Principal Waters	Recurring Cast
2022	Tom Swift	Barton Swift	Recurring Cast
2022	Black Bird	Dr. Aaron Zicherman	Recurring Cast
2022	The Wright Turn	Detective Duncan	Recurring Cast
2023	FBI: Most Wanted	Alonzo Stackhouse	Episode: "These Walls"
2023	Swagger	Camden Ryder Sr.	Recurring Cast: Season 2
2024	BMF	Frank "Blaze" Andreas	Recurring Cast: Season 3
2024	Bruh	Coach O'Brien	Recurring Cast: Season 4
2024	Tell Me Lies	Mr. Linder	Recurring Cast: Season 2
2024–25	The Equalizer	Captain Curtis Martin	Recurring Cast: Season 5
2026	FBI	Eric Atwood	Episode: "Fanatics"

=== Video games ===
Year	Title	Role	Notes
2005	Outlaw Tennis	Luther Van Jackson	
2015	Minecraft: Story Mode	Slab	
