= Teddy Dunn =

American lawyer and former actor

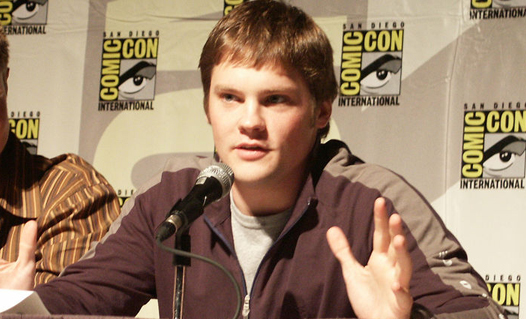
- Born: Edward Wilkes Dunn; June 19, 1980 (age 46); Torquay, Victoria, Australia
- Education: Northwestern University (BS); Boston College (JD)
- Occupations: Actor, lawyer
- Years active: 2004–2009
- Spouse: Kendall Morrison (m. 2017)
- Children: 1

Signature
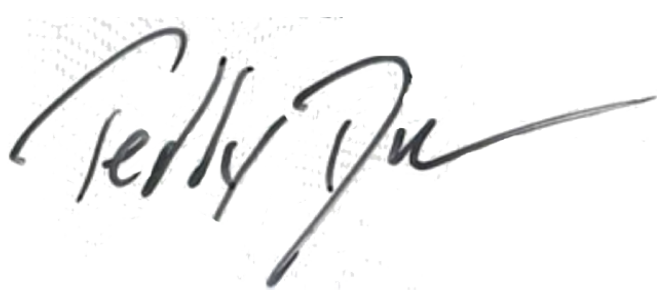

Edward Wilkes Dunn (born June 19, 1980) is a former actor best known for his portrayal of Duncan Kane in the Rob Thomas television series Veronica Mars.

== Early life and education ==
Dunn was born Edward Wilkes Dunn on June 19, 1980, in Torquay, Victoria, Australia. He has a sister, Laura. His family moved to Durham, North Carolina where he spent most of his childhood. He attended Phillips Academy, a preparatory high school in Andover, Massachusetts, graduating in 1999. At Phillips Academy, Dunn became involved in theatre, playing the role of Jerry in Edward Albee's The Zoo Story and the lead character of Alceste in Molière's The Misanthrope, directed by Kevin Heelan. Dunn attended Northwestern University, where he studied theatre and political science. He graduated cum laude, earning a Juris Doctor, from Boston College Law School in 2013.

== Career ==
=== Acting ===
Dunn was cast as a series regular for the first season of Veronica Mars as Duncan Kane, but left halfway through season 2 in the episode "Donut Run". He came back for a cameo in the season finale of season 2, "Not Pictured", but did not reprise his role in the third season. He also appeared in the 2004 remake of The Manchurian Candidate. The same year, he had a guest appearance on Gilmore Girls. He also had a guest appearance on Grey's Anatomy in 2006. He appeared in the 2008 film Jumper as Mark Kobold.

=== Law ===
Dunn practiced law with Walden Macht & Haran LLP in New York City from 2018 to 2020. Prior to that he was a law clerk to federal district judge William J. Martini of New Jersey; served as a litigation associate at Dechert LLP; and was a legal intern for the Office of the Prosecutor for the International Criminal Tribunal for the former Yugoslavia (ICTY) and the office of the attorney general of Massachusetts. As of 2020, he is an assistant United States attorney at the District of Columbia United States Attorney's Office.

== Personal life ==
He married Kendall Morrison on June 24, 2017; they have one child.

== Filmography ==
Film
Year	Title	Role	Notes
2004	The Manchurian Candidate	Wilson	
2008	Jumper	Mark Kobold	
2009	Kill Theory	Brent	
2009	A Good Funeral	Bret	

Television
Year	Title	Role	Notes
2004	Gilmore Girls	Graham Sullivan	Episode: "Last Week Fights, This Week Tights"
2004–2006	Veronica Mars	Duncan Kane	Main role (seasons 1–2); 44 episodes
2005	Campus Confidential	Brandon	Television film
2006	Grey's Anatomy	Heath Mercer	Episode: "Band-Aid Covers the Bullet Hole"
2008	CSI: NY	Kevin Hall	Episode: "Enough"
