= Betty and Veronica (Veronica Mars) =

- Veronica Mars episode
- Episode no.: Season 1 Episode 16
- Directed by: Michael Fields
- Written by: Diane Ruggiero
- Production code: 2T5715
- Original air date: March 29, 2005

Guest appearances
- Corinne Bohrer as Lianne Mars; Alona Tal as Meg Manning; Max Greenfield as Leo D'Amato; Lisa Thornhill as Celeste Kane; Christopher B. Duncan as Clarence Wiedman; Kyle Searles as Richie; Kyle Secor as Jake Kane

Episode chronology
← Previous "Ruskie Business"	Next → "Kanes and Abel's"
- Veronica Mars season 1

"Betty and Veronica" is the sixteenth episode of the first season of the American mystery television series Veronica Mars. Written by Diane Ruggiero and directed by Michael Fields, the episode premiered on UPN on March 29, 2005.

The series depicts the adventures of Veronica Mars (Kristen Bell) as she deals with life as a high school student while moonlighting as a private detective. In this episode, Veronica investigates the mysterious disappearance of Neptune High's mascot, a parrot named Polly, and eventually goes undercover at Neptune High's rival, Pan High. Meanwhile, in flashbacks, Veronica deals with the aftermath of finding her mother (Corinne Bohrer).

== Synopsis ==
Veronica searches through her stuff and finds a microphone in a pencil sharpener, suggesting that Clarence Wiedman (Christopher B. Duncan) was tracking her. Veronica waits for Wallace (Percy Daggs III) after a basketball game until Principal Clemmons pulls her aside. Principal Clemmons asks Veronica to find the school's mascot, a bird named Polly, which has recently been stolen. Veronica agrees to help under certain conditions. The principal and others think that a rival high school, Pan High, took the bird. Wallace is becoming increasingly popular and abandons Veronica at lunch. Veronica goes undercover at Pan High, but their basketball players act as surprised as Neptune's at the parrot stealing. In addition, Veronica receives news that the Pan High mascot has also been stolen. Flashing back to where the previous episode left off, Veronica confronts her mother about her feelings for Jake Kane (Kyle Secor). Lianne says that she knows Jake Kane is innocent because they were together at the time of the murder. Veronica asks Leo for the tapes of Lilly's (Amanda Seyfried) murder investigation. Back in the past, Lianne informs Veronica that the meeting was to "protect her." Undercover at the school, everyone sees people congratulating a nerdy looking boy, Wilson on stealing the parrot, while Neptune sends a package of goat meat to the cafeteria.

Veronica talks to Wilson and flirts with him, asking if he would give her a tour of Rest Stop 15 (a place where students go to park, buy and sell, etc.). Veronica catches the boy's locker combination and calls Weevil (Francis Capra) with the parrot information, and lets Weevil know of the plan to meet at Rest Stop 15. Upon arriving at Rest Stop 15, Wilson is confronted by Weevil. Wilson says that the parrot in the picture is not Neptune's mascot. Back in the past, Lianne says that she does not know who Veronica's real father is, and that a paternity test would be needed. Veronica gets Leo (Max Greenfield) to bring the Lilly Kane investigation tapes to her. At Neptune High, Veronica sits with Wallace and his new friends. Later, Wallace leads Veronica to a truck with a goat in it. Veronica listens to the interrogation tapes, and she hears Keith (Enrico Colantoni) talking to Jake Kane. Veronica sends Wallace to deliver a "gift" to Clarence Wiedman's assistant with a concealed listening device. Veronica listens to Keith's interrogation of Celeste Kane (Lisa Thornhill). That night, Veronica goes on a date with Leo before she sees Meg (Alona Tal) with Duncan (Teddy Dunn) on a double date with Jake and Celeste at the same restaurant. Flashing back one more time, Lianne reveals Celeste's knowledge of the affair. Veronica points out a mistake in Jake and Celeste's story—Lianne says they were at the hotel for 20 minutes, while Jake said they were there for 2.5 hours. Meanwhile, a Pan High student in a mask shows the Neptune people over TV that he has the parrot. The student demands that Wallace does not play or else Polly will die.

Veronica talks with Meg, who says that the thug must have put in the announcement the night before. The two examine the photograph, and Veronica sees a basketball number on the person's sneakers. Veronica steals both the mascots back and frames the actual culprit—Jack, one of Wallace's teammates, who stole the parrot so he could start for Neptune, sabotage them, and clean up by betting against them. Veronica empties her bank account to check her mother into a rehabilitation center. Veronica talks to her father about her discovery that Abel Koontz (Christian Clemenson) is someone's patsy. Veronica takes out the bugged pencil sharpener and states that she knows who collected Abel Koontz's accounts. Veronica, assuming that Wallace has delivered the "gift", listens. Clarence Wiedman asks his assistant to call Amelia DeLongpre, and Veronica finds out that Amelia is Abel Koontz's daughter.

== Cultural references ==
A variety of cultural references are made in the episode:

- Veronica references the Wildlife Alliance and the film Valley Girl.
- Veronica misquotes an Academy Award speech of Sally Field.
- Veronica says that the Neptune High vending machines carry Orangina.
- Veronica calls herself a "human Google".
- Lianne reminds Veronica about a time when she wanted to have Cyndi Lauper's haircut.
- When Lianne tells Veronica that her meet-up with Jake Kane was just to talk to him, Veronica snippily replies "On the day all the Starbucks were closed."
- Wallace says that the goat ate his Air Jordans.
- Veronica references the 1976 supernatural horror film Carrie.
- Richie compares Rest Stop 15 as a cross between Inspiration Point, a location in Happy Days, and Tijuana.
- Veronica chooses the alias "Betty" at Pan High School, which is a reference to the often at-odds characters Betty and Veronica in Archie Comics. As "Betty," she says she is a transfer student from Riverdale.
- Polly, the mascot of Neptune High, was also a reference to the sister of Betty from Archie Comics.

== Arc significance ==
- Lianne Mars doesn't know who Veronica's father is—it could be Jake or Keith.
- Lianne says that she was with Jake at the time of Lilly's murder, but that Celeste barged in. However, Celeste was only there for twenty minutes.
- Veronica gets the interrogation tapes of Jake and Celeste. They both claim they were at a hotel for two and a half hours, but their stories conflict.
- Veronica finds that Clarence Wiedman bugged her room, so she bugs his office and learns that Abel Koontz has a daughter, Amelia DeLongpre.

== Music ==
The following music can be heard in the episode:

- "Pick Up The Phone" by The Notwist
- "You And Your Kind" by The Brown Mountain Lights
- "A Chorus Line" by Ultramagnetic MC's
- "Rabbit" by The Fire Marshals of Bethlehem
- "Nothing Is Wrong" by The Brown Mountain Lights
- "Fall Behind Me" by The Donnas
- "Headphonland: The Gangster Chapter" by Mice Parade

== Production ==
The episode was written by regular writer Diane Ruggiero and directed by Michael Fields. This episode marks Ruggiero's fifth writing credit for the show as well as Fields's second directing credit (after "The Wrath of Con"). The episode's title is a joking reference to two characters from Archie Comics: Betty Cooper and Veronica Lodge. At Pan High, Veronica calls herself "Betty" and says that she is a transfer from "Riverdale High", the name of a school and town in the comic strip. In addition, this episode features appearances by several recurring characters, including Veronica's mother Lianne (Corinne Bohrer), Duncan's parents, Celeste (Lisa Thornhill) and Jake Kane (Kyle Secor), Leo D'Amato (Max Greenfield) and Meg Manning (Alona Tal).

== Reception ==
=== Ratings ===
In its original broadcast, the episode received 2.33 million viewers, ranking 113th of 121 in the weekly rankings.

=== Reviews ===
The episode received mixed to positive reviews. Television Without Pity gave it a "B+". Price Peterson, writing for TV.com, gave a mixed to negative review. "Okay, so I got slightly bored with all the mascot stuff." He also criticized the discovery of Abel Koontz's daughter, calling it "far-fetched." However, the reviewer also wrote that "still though, the mythology reveals were pretty great."

By contrast, Rowan Kaiser of The A.V. Club gave a more positive review, praising the characterization of Veronica and Wallace as well as the movement of the Lilly Kane case. "But as much momentum as the Lilly Kane murder plot is picking up, I'm happy with the case-of-the-week here, too, as trifling as it may be. I like it because it's a Wallace-centered episode, probably the strongest showcase for Percy Daggs III we've had yet."
