= Mars vs. Mars =

- Veronica Mars episode
- Veronica Mars (Kristen Bell) tells Abel Koontz (Christian Clemenson) that she knows he is dying and took the blame for Lilly Kane's (Amanda Seyfried) murder for payment.
- Episode no.: Season 1 Episode 14
- Directed by: Marcos Siega
- Story by: Rob Thomas
- Teleplay by: Jed Seidel; Diane Ruggiero
- Production code: 2T5713
- Original air date: February 15, 2005

Guest appearances
- Daran Norris as Cliff McCormack; Leighton Meester as Carrie Bishop; Max Greenfield as Leo D'Amato; Christian Clemenson as Abel Koontz; Christine Lakin as Susan Knight; Lisa Long as Jessica Fueller; Adam Scott as Chuck Rooks

Episode chronology
← Previous "Lord of the Bling"	Next → "Ruskie Business"
- Veronica Mars season 1

"Mars vs. Mars" is the fourteenth episode of the first season of the American mystery television series Veronica Mars. The episode's teleplay was written by Jed Seidel and Diane Ruggiero, from a story by series creator Rob Thomas, and was directed by Marcos Siega. The episode premiered on UPN on February 15, 2005.

The series depicts the adventures of Veronica Mars (Kristen Bell) as she deals with life as a high school student while moonlighting as a private detective. In this episode, Veronica and her father Keith (Enrico Colantoni) take opposing sides when Veronica's world history teacher, Mr. Rooks (Adam Scott) is accused of sexual assault on a student.

== Synopsis ==
Immediately after the previous episode, Logan (Jason Dohring) appears at Veronica's door and asks Veronica to help find his mother, Lynn (Lisa Rinna), whom he believes is alive. Veronica agrees to help out. The next day in class, Veronica participates in a fun and unorthodox world history review with a teacher, Mr. Rooks (Adam Scott). However, the fun is disrupted when Carrie Bishop (Leighton Meester) tells the teacher that she's not pregnant and that he can "have [his] key back." Veronica talks to the teacher, but he denies that he ever touched Carrie. Meanwhile, Wallace Fennel (Percy Daggs III) steals Carrie's school file while Veronica asks Duncan (Teddy Dunn) for the name of his practitioner, wanting to find out what meds he was taking. Veronica angrily confronts Carrie about her lying. Veronica walks into Mars Investigations, when she learns that Keith has been hired by Carrie's parents, pitting father and daughter against each other. Later, Cliff McCormack (Daran Norris) fake interviews the woman who saw Lynn's suicide, and Logan blows up at her.

Veronica visits Mr. Rooks's home, where she finds out the details of the parent-teacher conference a few months earlier: it was simply about grades on the midterm paper. However, Mr. Rooks does not have a lawyer for the hearing. Keith presents some increased evidence for his side to Veronica. Logan gives a tabloid newspaper to Veronica, which states that Lynn Echolls is still alive. Veronica interviews the woman who gave the story, but the woman turns out to be a crazed fan. Logan is finally convinced that his mother is dead. Weevil (Francis Capra) tells Veronica about a freshman who says that Lynn Echolls jumped. Veronica talks to Mr. Rooks about his previous firing (which Keith attributed to sexual assault). Veronica tells Carrie about the fault in her story—that she was actually at a track meet the day she claimed to have had sex with Mr. Rooks. Veronica steals Duncan's medical records and finds out that Abel Koontz (Christian Clemenson) shared a doctor with the Kanes. At the school hearing, Mr. Rooks is acquitted when Carrie's text message evidence is debunked after Veronica shows that it is incredibly easy to create fake text messages.

Veronica visits Mr. Rooks's house, where she notices several of the details that Carrie mentioned about his house. Veronica researches Duncan's medication, which she finds is used to treat a form of epilepsy which can cause violent fits and memory blackouts. Duncan researches the winner of the Extemporaneous Speaking Competition, a competition which Mr. Rooks was involved in, and Veronica visits her. It turns out that that girl, Susan (Christine Lakin), was the one who slept with Mr. Rooks and that she is pregnant. However, Carrie tried to make her story known. Weevil brings the freshman who talked about Logan's mom to Logan and Veronica. The boy was shooting a movie on a bridge and saw a body jumping from the bridge at 4:37 PM, exactly the time Lynn Echolls probably jumped from the bridge. However, a few minutes later, Veronica notices that Lynn Echolls's missing credit card has just been used. Later, Veronica sees that Mr. Rooks has resigned. Veronica talks to Abel Koontz, and she reveals a key piece of information: Abel Koontz was dying, so he decided to go to jail because he's going to die anyway, suggesting that he's a patsy for an unknown person.

== Arc significance ==
- Veronica finds a video that apparently shows Lynn Echolls falling from the bridge and shows it to Logan, but then gets a report that one of Lynn's credit cards has been used.
- Veronica finds out that Abel Koontz is dying.
- Veronica finds out that Duncan has type IV epilepsy.

== Music ==
In addition to the series's theme song, "We Used to Be Friends", by The Dandy Warhols, the following music can be heard in the episode:

- "Don't Stand So Close to Me" by The Police (sung by several girls to Carrie Bishop to mock her)
- "Tulips" by Bloc Party
- "Worried About You" by The Rolling Stones

== Production ==
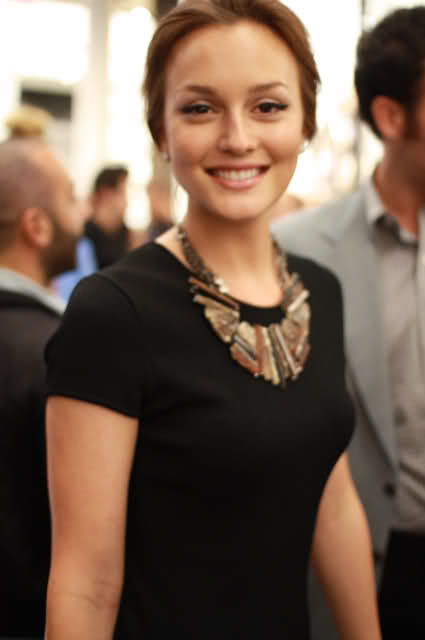
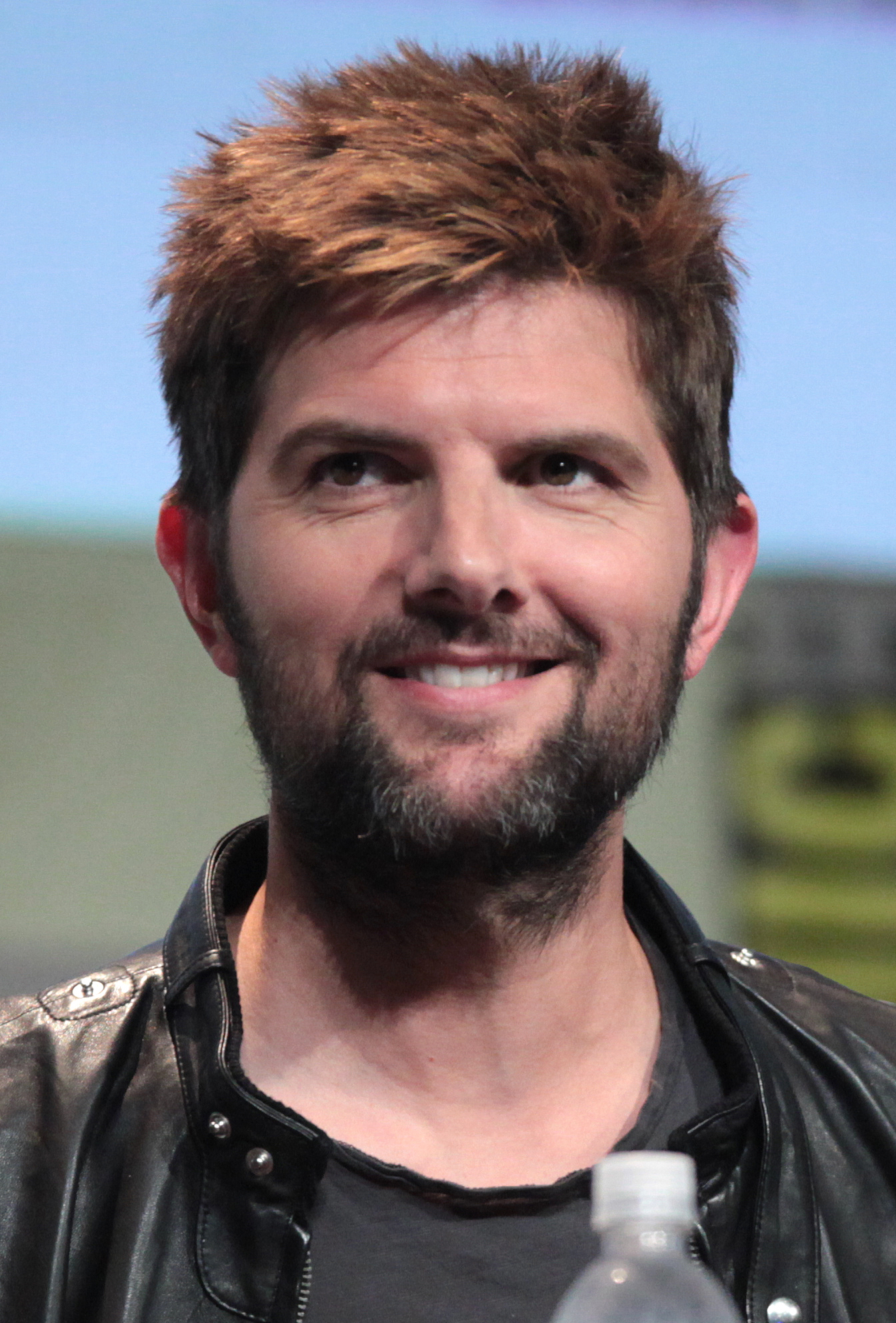
The episode's guest stars include Leighton Meester (left) and Adam Scott (right).

The episode was written by three regular writers—series creator Rob Thomas, Jed Seidel, and Diane Ruggiero. This is Thomas's fifth writing credit for the series, after "Pilot", "Credit Where Credit's Due", "Return of the Kane" (story), and "Drinking the Kool-Aid (story). In addition, the episode is Seidel's fourth writing credit, after "Meet John Smith", "The Girl Next Door", and "Silence of the Lamb" and Ruggiero's fourth writing credit, after "The Wrath of Con", "The Girl Next Door" (teleplay), and "An Echolls Family Christmas".

As a joke, three of the episode's guest stars' last names are also names of chess pieces—Carrie Bishop, Susan Knight, and Chuck Rooks. Among the episode's guest stars are Adam Scott, who would later become known for his role on Party Down (which was co-created by Veronica Mars writers and producers Rob Thomas, John Enbom and Dan Etheridge), and Leighton Meester, who would later become famous for her role on Gossip Girl as Blair Waldorf. Lead actress Kristen Bell provided the anonymous voiceover for Gossip Girl. 11 years after this episode aired, Bell and Scott would later appear together on the comedy series The Good Place.

== Reception ==
=== Ratings ===
In its original airing, the episode received 2.70 million viewers, ranking 107th of 115 in the weekly rankings.

=== Reviews ===
Television Without Pity gave the episode an "A". Rowan Kaiser, writing for The A.V. Club, gave a positive review. She noted Veronica's increased presence in the episode. "Veronica's a busy bee in this episode, making time to dominate the A, B, and C-plots." Also, the reviewer praised the character development in the episode, stating that "[b]ut again, it's the character work that makes this episode stand out. Thanks to having three different plots, all using Veronica, it has a constant narrative drive."

Price Peterson of TV.com wrote positively of the episode as well. In the reviewer's verdict, he wrote, "This was just a good episode of Veronica Mars. Lots of different conflicts, reversals, and reveals."
