= Weapons of Class Destruction =

- Veronica Mars episode
- Veronica (Kristen Bell) and Logan (Jason Dohring) kiss for the first time. Series creator Rob Thomas was not pleased with the moment, stating that it should have been "hungry, or a release, or mixed with some self-loathing and confusion. Instead, it came off as singularly romantic."
- Episode no.: Season 1 Episode 18
- Directed by: John Kretchmer
- Written by: Jed Seidel
- Production code: 2T5717
- Original air date: April 12, 2005

Guest appearances
- Jonathan Taylor Thomas as Ben; Tina Majorino as Cindy "Mac" Mackenzie; Alona Tal as Meg Manning; Max Greenfield as Leo D'Amato; Erica Gimpel as Alicia Fennel; Theo Rossi as Norris Clayton; Michael McMillian as Pete Kaminski; Joey Lauren Adams as Geena Stafford

Episode chronology
← Previous "Kanes and Abel's"	Next → "Hot Dogs"
- Veronica Mars season 1

"Weapons of Class Destruction" is the eighteenth episode of the first season of the American mystery television series Veronica Mars. Written by Jed Seidel and directed by John Kretchmer, the episode premiered on UPN on April 12, 2005.

The series depicts the adventures of Veronica Mars (Kristen Bell) as she deals with life as a high school student while moonlighting as a private detective. In this episode, Veronica investigates the persistent bomb threats at her school. Meanwhile, Keith (Enrico Colantoni) begins dating Alicia Fennel (Erica Gimpel), and Veronica's relationship with Logan (Jason Dohring) progresses.

"Weapons of Class Destruction" introduces the romantic relationship between Veronica and Logan, a romance that would continue on-and-off throughout the series and its subsequent film adaptation. Series creator Rob Thomas did not originally envision this relationship, but he changed his mind when he saw the chemistry between the two actors and characters. The episode received positive reviews, with discussion focusing on Veronica and Logan's first kiss. The episode has been frequently cited as one of the best in the series.

== Synopsis ==
Veronica is kissing Leo D'Amato (Max Greenfield) outside her house. After Veronica goes back into her house, Keith announces that he has begun dating Wallace's (Percy Daggs III) mother, Alicia, making things awkward between Veronica and Wallace. Veronica notices a sign outside which says "KillemAll.net". In class, there is a fire drill, and Duncan (Teddy Dunn) says that it is the third one this week. Veronica talks to Principal Clemmons about the fire drill issue, but he doesn't give anything up to her. Later, she notices K-9 units going through the building, though the dogs don't alert on the weed one of her classmates hides on his person. Veronica, posing as the superintendent, calls Principal Clemmons, who reveals that the school has experienced several bomb threats. She prints the story in the school newspaper, causing chaos at school the next day. Principal Clemmons calls her in again and tells her to stop printing stories. Veronica and Wallace talk to each other while Keith and Alicia watch a movie. Alicia tries to convince Wallace to accept their relationship to no avail. After talking to Mac (Tina Majorino), another student, Pete (Michael McMillian) approaches Veronica to say that he saw two students, Ben (Jonathan Taylor Thomas) and Norris (Theo Rossi) with exploding tennis balls. Wallace places the two students under more suspicion when he tells Veronica about them, and Veronica sees a mysterious countdown timer on the KillemAll.net website.

Duncan and Meg (Alona Tal) approach Veronica, and she tells Meg the general overview of a case where someone has been evading capture and all the tactics they used to do so before Duncan suddenly leaves. Wallace gives Veronica the student file on one of the two students, but his high school records are clean after bullying in junior high. The other student doesn't have a file. Veronica talks to Duncan, who says he knows about her investigation. Duncan scoffs at her findings before he realizes that she suspects him in the murder, reacting with extreme rage before dashing out of the room. Ben and Norris talk about guns and bombs, leading Veronica to track Ben, eventually seeing him buying fertilizer and taking out a rifle. Ben gets into the car and orders her to drive to the Camelot motel. There, Logan appears and beats him up before it is revealed that the "suspect" is actually an ATF agent. Ben says that he is investigating Norris, but needs her help: Norris has a crush on Veronica, and Ben asks her to get close to him. As she leaves the motel, Veronica and Logan kiss unexpectedly.

Veronica gets an invitation to Norris's house, but she doesn't find any weapons. Veronica calls Mac to help her break into the WiFi before she sees Pete in front of the house. The ATF searches Norris's vehicle and finds fertilizer and a rifle, despite Veronica's convictions that he is not the perpetrator. However, Veronica recognizes them as being the same ones Ben was loading into his car earlier. Veronica calls Pete, and she tells him that she knows he falsely implicated Norris (with the help of the ATF agent) because of terrible bullying in junior high. Meg tells Veronica that Duncan has disappeared after removing $10,000 from the bank. The story involving Norris is published in the newspaper, and, although it leads to all charges against Norris being dropped, it also results in the new journalism teacher's (Joey Lauren Adams) termination.

== Production ==
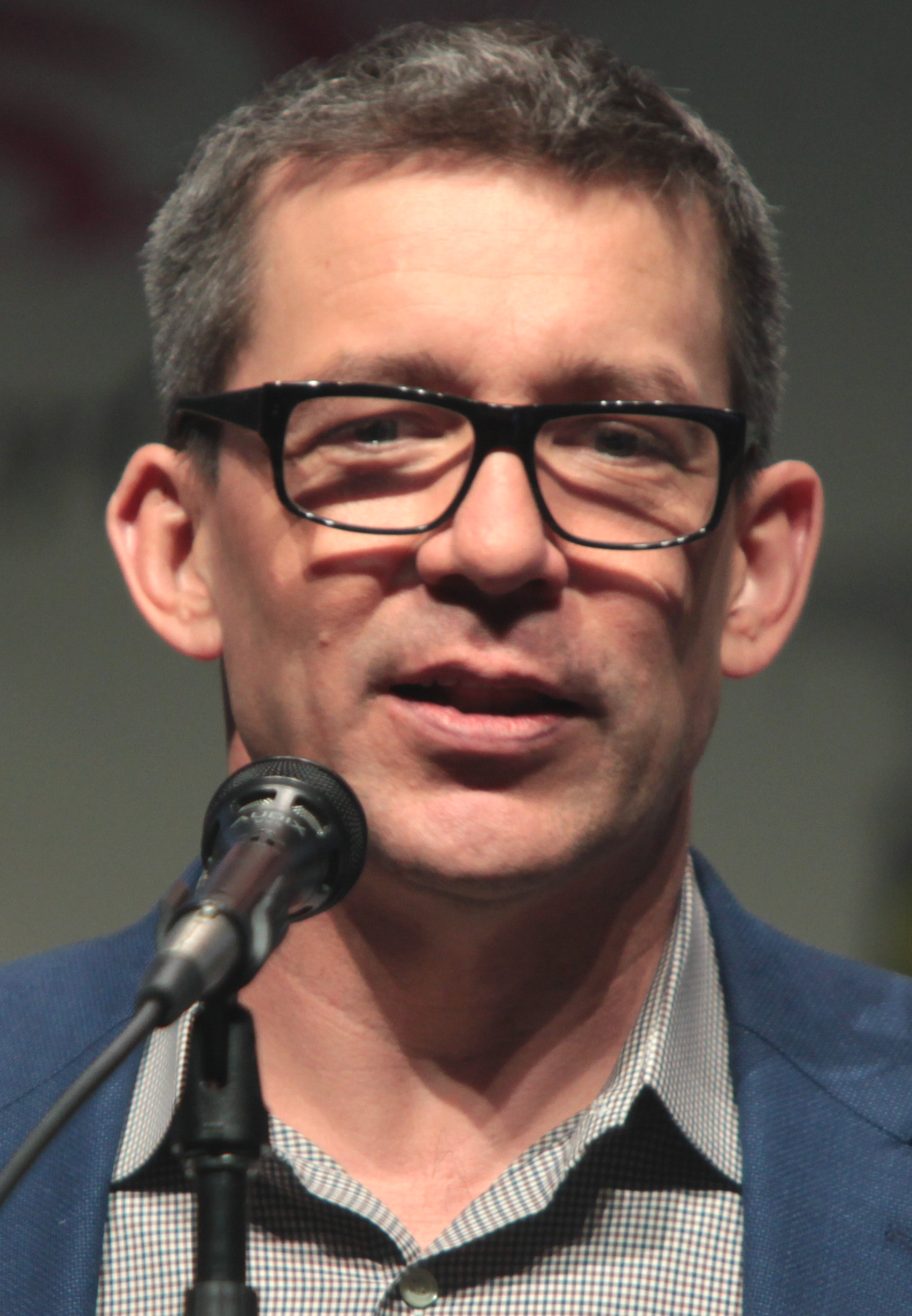
Series creator Rob Thomas did not intend for Veronica and Logan to become a couple.

The episode was written by Jed Seidel and directed by John Kretchmer. This episode marks Seidel's fifth and final writing credit for the series, after "Meet John Smith", "The Girl Next Door", "Silence of the Lamb", and "Mars vs. Mars". In addition, this episode is the second directing credit for Kretchmer, after "Silence of the Lamb."

The episode also explains the departure of journalism teacher Mallory Dent (Sydney Tamiia Poitier), who made her last appearance in "The Girl Next Door", also introducing Dent's replacement, Geena Stafford, who is subsequently fired in the same episode. The episode introduces a romantic relationship between Veronica and Logan through their first kiss. Originally, Veronica and Logan were not intended to be a couple. At PaleyFest 2014, series creator Rob Thomas stated that "The truth is, we never had any intention at all for Logan to end up with Veronica. [Dohring] was hired to be the obligatory psychotic jackass. In the writers' room, sitting around watching dailies, we would all gather around, and it was like, 'We want to watch that. We want to watch those two onscreen together.'" However, Dohring and Bell found out the plan for the two characters around the filming of "Return of the Kane" or "The Girl Next Door".

On the reveal, Dohring said in an interview: "I’m actually glad, Rob told us about episode six or seven that we would get together. We were like, ‘No way!’ But there was something going on there. We could feel it as actors. It was damn cool – these characters had some kind of connection. So we had to start to soften it up a little bit and break the ice somewhat [between the characters]. I’m glad he gave us that heads up." Lead actress Kristen Bell expressed surprise over the initial decision by saying, "I love working with Jason and he's such a great actor to work opposite, but sometimes, I feel it's really just weird luck. Somehow people get magic dust sprinkled on them and you don't know why. You look like you have boatloads of chemistry with someone else." On the kiss itself, Dohring noted, "It was so funny, as an actor, to kiss this girl. I was all nervous beforehand. But you have to just let it go for the scene. It was so fun to watch [later when it aired]," adding that "a lot of that emotion was real for me." The song "Momentary Thing" by band Something Happens plays during Veronica and Logan's first kiss.

Series creator Rob Thomas was not content with the kiss scene, writing that it was not how he envisioned it. "I wasn't actually pleased with the first Veronica/Logan kiss. Now, I may have been wrong on this front, but it wasn't what I imagined, or really what I think was described in the script. The line of description called for Logan to "devour" Veronica. I wanted it to be—I don't know if sexual is the right word, but—hungry, or a release, or mixed with some self-loathing and confusion. Instead, it came off as singularly romantic."

== Reception ==
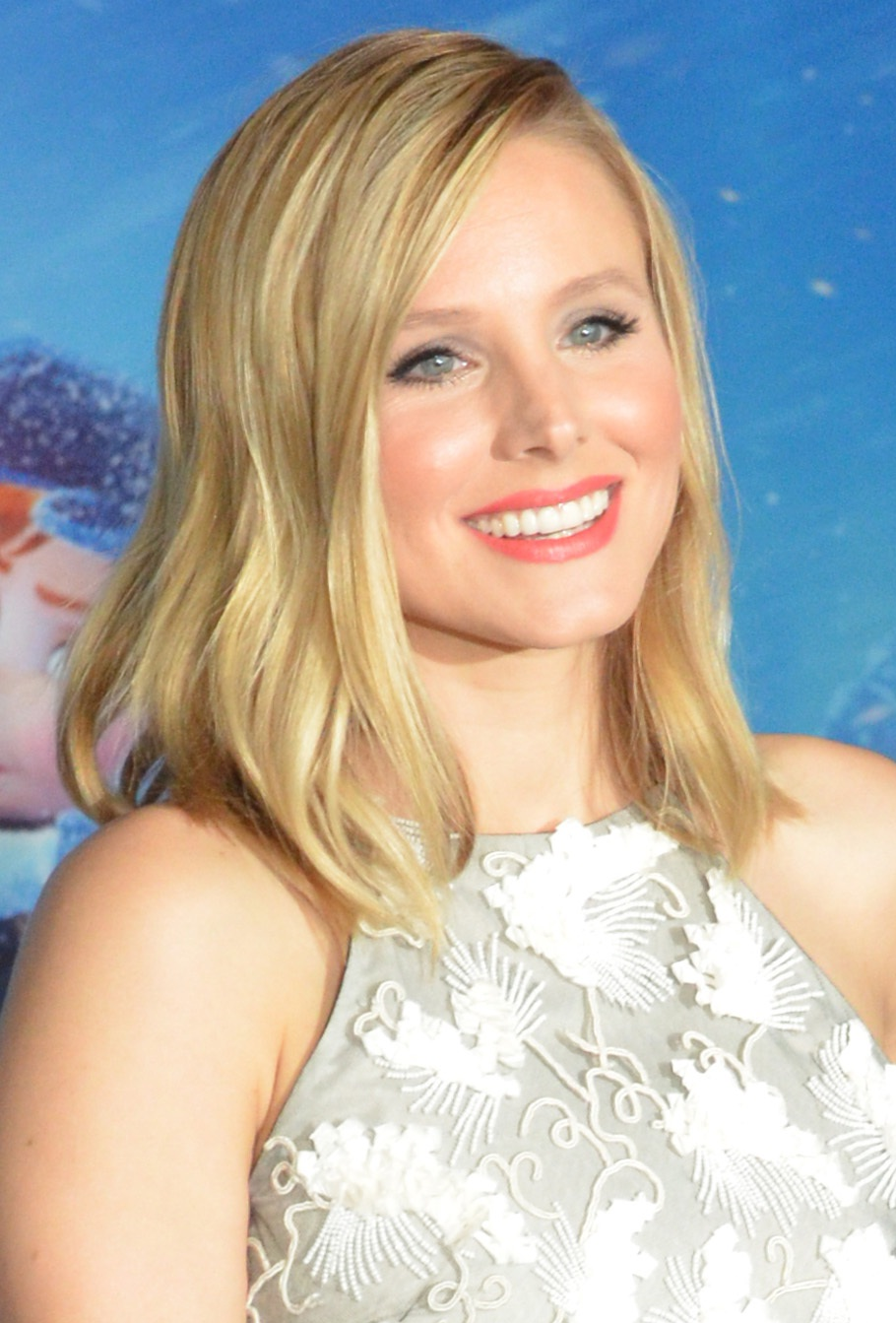
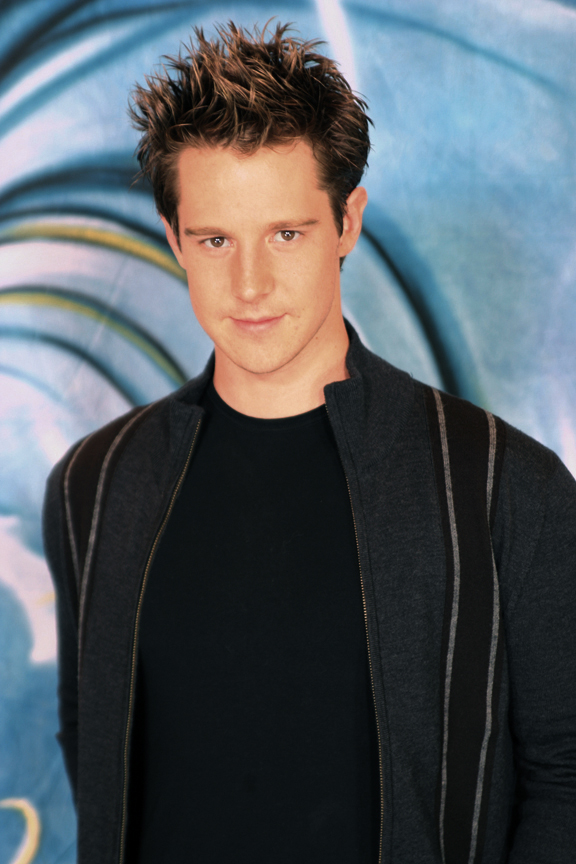
Critical reviews centered on the budding relationship between Veronica (Kristen Bell, left) and Logan (Jason Dohring, right).

=== Ratings ===
In its original broadcast, the episode received 2.30 million viewers, ranking 114th of 120 in the weekly rankings.

=== Reviews ===
The episode received primarily positive reviews, with critical attention mostly going to Veronica and Logan's relationship. Price Peterson of TV.com gave the episode a positive review, noting that "[o]bviously the most notable aspect of this episode was the Logan-Veronica hookup. Again, it seemed really sudden, but in the sense that they are both mercurial teenagers it seemed right, particularly when they didn't know how to handle themselves afterward." Television Without Pity gave the episode a "B+", writing that "[Veronica] kisses Logan! You heard me! How could you not, with all the exclamation points!"

Rowan Kaiser, writing for The A.V. Club, gave a mixed review. While calling the case-of-the-week "predictable", the reviewer also called Keith and Alicia's new relationship "perhaps the most fun" part of the episode. In addition, Kaiser commented on Veronica and Logan's relationship. "I'm not entirely sold on the relationship, either from a character point of view or a quality point of view. Obviously it's just a kiss in the heat of the moment…but it doesn't seem to have much motivation beyond [that]." IGN placed the episode 2nd in its list of the top ten Veronica Mars episodes, second to only "Leave It to Beaver". The publication praised the new Logan-Veronica dynamic and said "The few episodes just before this one showed the softer, vulnerable side of Logan and just when you wonder if he's really so bad, he saves the day and an innocent peck turned into a passionate embrace."

E! reacted to the scene by writing, "We seemed to experience the same whirlwind of emotions they did: The hesitance, the shock, the elation, the weirdness of how right it felt, and then, of course, the inevitable 'Oh crap, what did we just do and what does this mean?' awkwardness of it all. They, and the show, would never be the same. In the best way possible." BuzzFeed ranked the episode as the 4th best Veronica Mars episode, behind "A Trip to the Dentist", "Leave It to Beaver", and "Not Pictured." TVLine ranked the episode 6th on a similar list. Give Me My Remote ranked "Weapons of Class Destruction" as the fifth best episode of Veronica Mars, particularly noting the kiss scene between Logan and Veronica. "Veronica kisses Logan in a scene that was full of so much chemistry that it gave me chills. The episode ends with Veronica figuring out that Ben was setting Norris up, but, honestly, who was really paying attention at that point? Veronica and Logan had finally realized that their chemistry was undeniable!"

Kimberly Roots, writing for TVLine, responded to the kiss scene by stating, "What got me – and still gets me – about this kiss is how much fire it has. This isn’t a drunken, convenient hook-up. This isn’t a let’s-see-how-this-goes peck. This is two people acting on years of something unacknowledged between them. We get a long moment of LoVe in action before they break apart and realize what just happened." Entertainment Weekly called "Weapons of Class Destruction" one of the "10 essential episodes of Veronica Mars".
