= Ruskie Business =

- Veronica Mars episode
- Veronica (Kristen Bell) finds her mother, Lianne (Corinne Bohrer), alone in a bar.
- Episode no.: Season 1 Episode 15
- Directed by: Guy Bee
- Written by: Phil Klemmer; John Enbom
- Production code: 2T5714
- Original air date: February 22, 2005

Guest appearances
- Alyson Hannigan as Trina Echolls; Alona Tal as Meg Manning; Max Greenfield as Leo D'Amato; Corinne Bohrer as Lianne Mars; Christopher B. Duncan as Clarence Wiedman; Cynthia Lamontagne as Yelena Sukarenko; Zachery Ty Bryan as Caz Truman

Episode chronology
← Previous "Mars vs. Mars"	Next → "Betty and Veronica"
- Veronica Mars season 1

"Ruskie Business" is the fifteenth episode of the first season of the American mystery television series Veronica Mars. Written by Phil Klemmer and John Enbom and directed by Guy Bee, the episode premiered on UPN on February 22, 2005.

The series depicts the adventures of Veronica Mars (Kristen Bell) as she deals with life as a high school student while moonlighting as a private detective. In this episode, Veronica is hired by a Russian mail-order bride who requests her help in finding a long-lost love. Meanwhile, Veronica must help her friend, Meg (Alona Tal) deal with a secret admirer while simultaneously guiding Logan (Jason Dohring) through the possibility that his mother, Lynn (Lisa Rinna) may still be alive.

== Synopsis ==
Veronica talks to Logan about his mom's credit card use. Meanwhile, Duncan organizes a 1980s-themed dance. While they are talking, Meg (Alona Tal) walks up and tells her that she has a secret admirer. Meg asks for her help. Veronica walks into Mars Investigations, where a woman named Katerina asks Veronica to find her fiancé. Katerina explains the situation—they met online, but they have lost touch, and she thinks that he is in Neptune. Veronica asks Wallace to track one of the two boys who possibly texted Meg, and he agrees. The next day, Meg receives some flowers from her secret admirer. Veronica reports back to Katerina that they haven't found Tom (her fiancé), but Katerina agrees to pay more. Veronica places a fake casting call to pinpoint Tom, which she does. Logan's mom's credit card shows up with another charge at a hotel. Logan and Veronica attempt to enter the room in which his mother is staying. They are denied access, but Logan decides to stake out the place until the situation is resolved. Veronica visits the flower shop, but the staff member is unhelpful. Veronica finds out that Tom's dog is named Steve and decides to track the dog down.

Veronica contacts local animal hospitals and eventually finds one with a Catahoula Leopard Dog named Steve. She pretends to want to breed "her dog" with Steve, but the dog's owner refuses to speak to her. Veronica visits Leo D'Amato (Max Greenfield), who agrees to call the numbers that the vet called. Meg goes to a party, but they find nothing in terms of her secret admirer. Logan continues to camp out in the hotel lobby. After Veronica appears, Logan sees someone who he thinks is his mom. However, it turns out to be Logan's stepsister Trina (Alyson Hannigan), with whom Logan has a tumultuous relationship. After Trina leaves, Logan breaks down crying in Veronica's arms after realizing that his mother really is gone. On Keith's own insurance fraud case, he is being followed by a group of men in a silver Chevrolet. Keith eventually steals the car, also seeing that it belongs to someone named Yevgeny Sukarenko. Veronica goes back to the flower shop, bringing a sketch artist to aid the owner's memory. Leo gets back to Veronica and mentions three names. Veronica recognizes the third name and is about to call Katerina back with the news before Keith stops her. It turns out that "Katerina" is actually Yelena Sukarenko, the wife of the criminal who is actually trying to track down Tom because he testified against her husband and has changed his identity through the Witness Protection Program.

Under Keith's instructions, Veronica tells Yelena a fake address. Yevgeny and his associate go into the fake address (the model home of Meg's party), where they are promptly arrested by Keith, Leo, and others. Veronica receives the copy of the sketch of the secret admirer (Duncan), although she doesn't tell Meg this. However, at the dance, Veronica allows Duncan to approach Meg. Veronica goes back to her car and breaks down until Leo appears and invites her back into the dance. Soon, the two see Logan, drunk and acting strange, charging through the room in a dress shirt and briefs. Leo kisses Veronica. Veronica receives several calls from an unknown number, which is actually a pay phone that her mom, Lianne (Corinne Bohrer), likely used. She goes to the pay phone and finds her mom. She tries to get her out of the bar before seeing Clarence Wiedman (Christopher B. Duncan) looking at them.

== Cultural references ==
A variety of cultural references are made in the episode, particularly to pop culture in the 1980s:

- The 1980s-themed dance is named after "Total Eclipse of the Heart".
- A drunk Logan channels the iconic Tom Cruise no-pants scene from Risky Business at the dance
- The episode title itself is a pun on Risky Business, with the missing person being sought using the name "Tom Cruz".
- Wallace and Veronica jokingly describe themselves as Best Friends Forever.
- Logan compares Veronica to Jim Rockford from The Rockford Files.
- Keith refers to The Love Boat.
- Logan calls the hotel manager Jeeves.
- Trina Echolls jokingly calls Logan and Veronica the Brat Pack.
- Logan insults Trina by saying that she would take a role as an extra in CSI.
- In his drunken state, Logan references "Everybody Have Fun Tonight" by Wang Chung.
- Logan also states that "[he's] gonna party like it's 1999" referencing the song "1999" by Prince.

== Arc significance ==
- It was Trina who was using Lynn's credit card, suggesting that Lynn is indeed dead.
- Veronica learns that Logan is physically abused by Aaron Echolls, his father.
- Veronica finds out that Meg's secret admirer was Duncan.
- Veronica finally finds her mother in a bar in Barstow. Clarence Wiedman followed her.

== Music ==
In part due to the 1980s-themed dance at the end of "Ruskie Business", several songs, including many 1980s hits, can be heard in the episode:

- "Just Another" by Pete Yorn
- "Waiting" by Taxi Doll
- Ballade No. 2 by Frédéric Chopin
- "One Thing Leads to Another" by The Fixx
- "Time After Time" by Cyndi Lauper
- "True" by Spandau Ballet
- "Warm Breeze" by Jeff Tatum

== Production ==
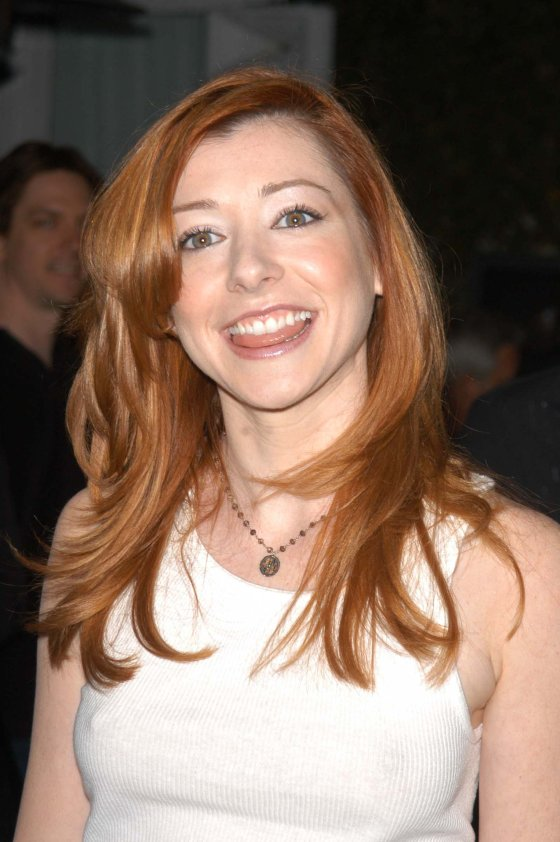
Alyson Hannigan (pictured) won the role of Trina Echolls over Tara Reid and Denise Richards.

The episode was written by Phil Klemmer and John Enbom. "Ruskie Business" marks Klemmer's third writing credit (after "Return of the Kane" and "Clash of the Tritons"), and Enbom's second writing credit (after "Lord of the Bling"). Director Guy Bee also previously directed "Like a Virgin." The episode's title is a tongue-in-cheek reference to the 1983 romantic comedy film Risky Business. It is a combination of the movie's title and "Ruskie," a slang term for a person from Russia.

The episode features the reappearance of several recurring guest stars, including Meg Manning (Alona Tal), who previously appeared in "Like a Virgin", and Veronica's mother, Lianne, who had not appeared for ten episodes, making her final previous appearance in "You Think You Know Somebody". In addition, the episode marks the first appearance of recurring character Trina Echolls (Alyson Hannigan), who would appear in three episodes over the course of the show. Then best known for her role as Willow Rosenberg on Buffy the Vampire Slayer, Hannigan won the role over actresses Tara Reid and Denise Richards.

== Reception ==
=== Ratings ===
In its original broadcast, "Ruskie Business" received 2.34 million viewers, ranking 100th of 107 in the weekly rankings and marking a decrease of roughly 350,000 viewers.

=== Reviews ===
The episode received positive reviews. Television Without Pity awarded the episode an "A", its second such rating in a row. Price Peterson, writing for TV.com, praised the episode and its 1980s themes. "I really liked this episode, particularly everything to do with the '80s dance." In addition, the reviewer lauded the episode's mix of mystery and romance. "I love when this show can balance its various mysteries and intrigue with some good, old-fashioned teenage romantic shenanigans, and this episode did just that."

Rowan Kaiser of The A.V. Club, also gave a positive review. "Veronica Mars has huge amounts of emotional and structural momentum heading into the last part of the season, and I'm looking forward to seeing how things turn out."
