= You Think You Know Somebody =

- Veronica Mars episode
- Episode no.: Season 1 Episode 5
- Directed by: Nick Gomez
- Written by: Dayna Lynne North
- Production code: 2T5704
- Original air date: October 26, 2004

Guest appearances
- Aaron Ashmore as Troy Vandegraff; Sam Huntington as Luke Haldeman; Corinne Bohrer as Lianne Mars; Paula Marshall as Rebecca James; Deron McBee as Hank "Ziggy" Zigman

Episode chronology
← Previous "The Wrath of Con"	Next → "Return of the Kane"
- Veronica Mars season 1

"You Think You Know Somebody" is the fifth episode of the first season of the American mystery television series Veronica Mars. Written by Dayna Lynne North and directed by Nick Gomez, the episode premiered on UPN on October 26, 2004.

The series depicts the adventures of Veronica Mars (Kristen Bell) as she deals with life as a high school student while moonlighting as a private detective. In this episode, Veronica goes on the case when her boyfriend Troy Vandegraff's (Aaron Ashmore) car goes missing and finds out some unpleasant information in the process.

== Synopsis ==
The episode opens in Tijuana, Mexico. Luke (Sam Huntington), Troy, and Logan (Jason Dohring) go in a car and cross the U.S.-Mexico border. After stopping at a diner, they notice that their car is missing, which is actually Troy's father's car. However, Veronica pulls up and takes them back home. After returning home, Logan and Luke leave, while, Veronica offers to help Troy find his father's car, an offer which he eventually accepts. While Veronica searches for Troy's car, she playfully teases Wallace (Percy Daggs III) and talks to him about potential birthday presents for Keith (Enrico Colantoni). Later, Veronica checks her dad's voicemail and hears a message from school guidance counselor Rebecca James (Paula Marshall), whom Keith had been dating. Meanwhile, Luke is being interrogated and threatened by Hank Zigman (Deron McBee). He tells Hank that he will have his "package", which is in Troy's car, tomorrow.

Veronica tells Keith that she's figured out his relationship with Rebecca, and he says that he is enjoying it. The next day, Luke tells Veronica that there was a piñata of steroids in the backseat of the car and he needs to get it to Hank Zigman or Hank will punish him severely. Veronica reluctantly agrees to help him. Veronica goes to a bank and tells the teller about the safety deposit box key she found in her mom's old stuff. In it, Veronica finds many secret photos of herself. Later, Rebecca shows up to talk to Veronica "outside of school", and Veronica treats the idea with sarcasm. Luke is chased by the drug dealers. The next day, Veronica confronts Logan about his steroid plan. Veronica finds Rebecca in their kitchen, but Veronica says that she has to leave before Rebecca can actually make dinner. At the junkyard, Weevil talks to a worker, Angel, who says that Troy's car has already come and gone.

Veronica confronts Luke in the women's bathroom, and she tells him that he needs to collect $8,000 himself to pay Zigman back. Veronica sends disposable cell phones to Lianne's (Corrine Bohrer) friends and family in an effort to let her know that it is okay to call her. Later, Veronica requests her dad's help in finding Troy's car. He agrees if Veronica will be nice to Rebecca. The next day, Keith goes to the car tracking company and poses as a high-ranking executive. The boss reluctantly does a scan. Veronica hands her dad a background check she did on Rebecca, and she has a criminal record. This leads to an increasingly heated debate in which Veronica eventually brings up her mother. Veronica sobs after the argument settles down.

Later, Veronica and Troy track the car, which they find is actually a tracker attached to a dog. The next day, Keith hands Veronica a background check he did on Troy. In addition, Keith tells Rebecca that they need to break up for Veronica's sake. Veronica confronts Troy about his past, which includes expulsion from two schools due to drug trafficking and possession. She also believes that he has something to do with the steroids. Troy says that he would have told her about his crimes when they got to know each other better, and he storms off, leaving Veronica to look after in despair. Veronica confronts Hank Zigman and hands him the $8,000, but he still says they are not "even". Veronica claims that he will eventually regret that moment. She then uses an image of Zigman she took with her phone for an unknown purpose.

Troy's father sends Troy off in a cab angrily. Troy's taxi stops at the restaurant in Tijuana where they originally "lost" the car. Troy is then seen pulling out in the stolen car. He talks with a girl named Shauna (with whom he had previously conspired), and she tells him that Veronica called and she accidentally revealed their whole plan to Veronica. It turns out that Veronica replaced the steroids with candy and left a sarcastically angry letter for Troy. Zigman is arrested at the U.S.–Mexico border using the photo Veronica took. That night, Veronica receives a call from her mother, who says that she misses her but that Veronica cannot (and will not) find her.

== Arc significance ==
- Troy is revealed as a drug dealer and leaves town to meet his girlfriend, who is also in on the drug scheme. However, Veronica figures everything out before he realizes it and flushes his stash down a toilet.
- Veronica finds a safe deposit box key which leads to some of her mother's belongings. When she opens the safe deposit box, she finds pictures of herself in gun sights.
- Veronica's mother calls her at the end of the episode and lets her know that she is okay and that 'everything will make sense when the time is right'. The call goes directly to Veronica's voicemail.

== Music ==
In addition to the series' theme song, "We Used to Be Friends", by The Dandy Warhols, the following music is heard in the episode:

- "Such Great Heights" by The Postal Service
- "Put Your Lights On" by Santana featuring Everlast
- "The New Kid" by Old 97's

== Production ==
Series regular Duncan Kane (Teddy Dunn) is absent from the episode. In addition, "You Think You Know Somebody" features recurring character Troy Vandegraff's departure from the show (except for a brief guest appearance in a second season episode). This episode's title refers to Veronica's betrayal by two characters—Troy and her mother.

== Reception ==
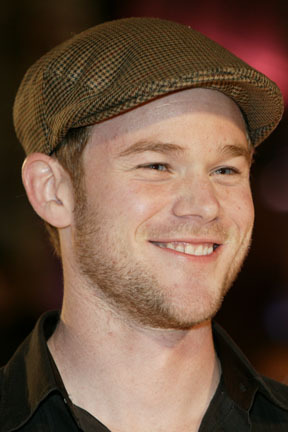
Critical reviews centered on the plot twist involving Troy Vandegraff (Aaron Ashmore, pictured)

=== Ratings ===
In its original broadcast, "You Think You Know Somebody" was watched by 2.73 million viewers, a significant drop from the previous episode. The airing ranked 107 of 114 in the weekly rankings.

=== Reviews ===
The episode garnered critical praise, with many centering on the eventual characterization and fate of the character of Troy Vandegraff. Price Peterson of TV.com, in a positive review, praised the plot twist at the end of the episode. "The fact that [Troy] was a bad guy all along just proved to me that this show might just have some tricks up its sleeves." Rowan Kaiser of The A.V. Club also lauded the plot twist. While calling the episode "[the show's] next step forward," the reviewer also wrote that "the writers pulled the rug out from that perception in an impressive, not frustrating fashion."

Matt Richenthal of TV Fanatic also remarked on Troy's negative side, but also commented positively on Keith's characterization. "We finally get to see a little bit more of Keith's emotional state this week, with the episode proving he was every bit as hurt as Veronica by his wife's sudden disappearance."
