= Kanes and Abel's =

- Veronica Mars episode
- Episode no.: Season 1 Episode 17
- Directed by: Nick Marck
- Written by: Carolyn Murray
- Production code: 2T5716
- Original air date: April 5, 2005

Guest appearances
- Amanda Seyfried as Lilly Kane; Lisa Thornhill as Celeste Kane; Christopher B. Duncan as Clarence Wiedman; Erin Chambers as Amelia DeLongpre; Megan Henning as Sabrina Fuller; Ken Marino as Vinnie Van Lowe; Zachery Ty Bryan as Caz Truman; Leonard Wu as Hamilton Cho; Kyle Secor as Jake Kane

Episode chronology
← Previous "Betty and Veronica"	Next → "Weapons of Class Destruction"
- Veronica Mars season 1

"Kanes and Abel's" is the seventeenth episode of the first season of the American mystery television series Veronica Mars. Written by Carolyn Murray and directed by Nick Marck, the episode premiered on UPN on April 5, 2005.

The series depicts the adventures of Veronica Mars (Kristen Bell) as she deals with life as a high school student while moonlighting as a private detective. In this episode, after finding out about Abel Koontz's (Christian Clemenson) daughter, Amelia DeLongpre (Erin Chambers), Veronica tracks her down and tells her that the Kanes are paying off her father. Meanwhile, Veronica investigates the mysterious harasser of Sabrina Fuller (Megan Henning).

== Synopsis ==
After the revelation in the previous episode, Veronica researches Amelia DeLongpre and finds out that she lives in L.A. and that all the payout money is coming to her. Meanwhile, Clarence Wiedman (Christopher B. Duncan) visits Amelia's roommate, who says that she disappeared with Veronica. Veronica takes Amelia to a secluded hotel where she will not be found. Veronica asks Amelia to fix the situation by telling people that he was paid off to cover up the murderer of Lilly Kane (Amanda Seyfried), although Amelia doesn't know that Abel is dying. Later, Veronica is dealing with midterm exams. Veronica meets another student, Sabrina, who is dealing with harassment, supposedly from an ex-boyfriend, Caz Truman (Zachery Ty Bryan). Veronica agrees to help for the money. Veronica talks to Caz, but he denies it vehemently. At Mars Investigations, Logan (Jason Dohring) gives Veronica a check for looking for his mother, but she rips the check apart. Veronica goes back to Amelia's hotel room, and Amelia tells the story of her parents' divorce. Veronica visits Sabrina and reports that she's found nothing. Later, Veronica notices a yellow truck lurking around her house and Caz is in it. However, he still denies the harassment, claiming that he's just looking out for her the same as Veronica is. Amelia asks Veronica to arrange a visitation with her father, despite the fact that she doesn't know about her father's illness.

A rival detective, Vinnie Van Lowe (Ken Marino), offers to give Veronica and Keith some of his cases. Veronica goes to a ceremony for a scholarship dedicated to Lilly. Knowing what she knows now, Veronica imagines potential situations for Lilly's murder. Veronica goes to the spot where Lilly was murdered. Sabrina points out Hamilton Cho (Leonard Wu), who has recently beat out Sabrina for valedictorian, and Veronica investigates him. Veronica puts a tracker on Hamilton's car. Clarence Wiedman visits Keith (Enrico Colantoni), asking if he knows where Amelia DeLongpre is, but he denies it. That night, Veronica talks to Keith and reveals that she's still on the case, although Keith is as far along on the case as she is. Keith says that he believes that Jake Kane (Kyle Secor) called Clarence Wiedman after he discovered Lilly's body. Sabrina calls Veronica reporting a car alarm that won't stop. Veronica talks to Logan and reveals Duncan's (Teddy Dunn) epilepsy. Logan tells her that one time, Duncan, in an epileptic seizure, almost killed Jake. Veronica begins to suspect that Vinnie Van Lowe is behind the Sabrina case as she has tracked the car alarm to his ex-wife. Veronica plants a video tracker in his office, but Veronica suddenly figures out that Hamilton Cho's father hired Vinnie to harass Sabrina without his son's knowledge. In the end, Hamilton gives up the valedictorian race, but he is okay with it.

Amelia has the settlement papers at her hotel before she is interrupted by Clarence Wiedman, who says that Veronica is a fraud. When Keith and Veronica go to the hotel room, they find Clarence, who says that Amelia has finalized the settlement and left. To cheer her up, Keith shows Veronica his evidence for the Lilly Kane case. Keith flashes back to his first interview with Jake and Celeste (Lisa Thornhill), where he found out that they were going through a load of laundry, despite the fact that the pair have two full-time housekeepers. Keith found a soccer uniform in the dryer, suggesting that Duncan (a soccer player) had killed Lilly and they were washing Duncan's uniform to remove the blood.

== Arc significance ==
- Amelia DeLongpre has money, thinking that it's from a stock owned by Abel Koontz, when it's actually money Jake Kane paid him to confess.
- Clarence Wiedman tracks Amelia down before she can give Veronica the papers showing Jake Kane paid Abel off and tells Amelia that her father is dying (something which Veronica did not tell her). Amelia leaves with money that Clarence gives her.
- Keith tells Veronica that Jake Kane called Clarence Wiedman before he reported the murder and that as he was talking to Jake and Celeste right after the body was found, the dryer buzzed. Inside the dryer was a soccer uniform (presumably Duncan's, implicating him as Lilly's murderer).

== Music ==
Several songs can be heard in the episode:

- "Breakin'" by The Music
- "Dangle" by The Daylight Titans
- "Dragonfly" by M. Craft
- "Ain't That a Kick in the Head?" by Dean Martin
- "Private Eyes by Hall & Oates" (sung by Ken Marino as Vinnie Van Lowe)

== Production ==
The episode was written by Carolyn Murray and directed by Nick Marck. "Kanes and Abel's" marks Marck's third directing credit (after "The Girl Next Door" and "An Echolls Family Christmas"). The episode features the first appearance by recurring character Vinnie Van Lowe (Ken Marino), who later starred in The State and Party Down, the latter of which series creator Rob Thomas co-created. In the episode, character Amelia DeLongpre (Erin Chambers) is seen watching the 1981 fantasy film Clash of the Titans, which features recurring guest star Harry Hamlin, who portrays Aaron Echolls on the show, in one of his first starring and best-known roles. The episode's title, a play on the biblical figures Cain and Abel, refers to several characters in the show—the Kane family and Abel Koontz. Around the airing of this episode, Veronica Mars was renewed for a second season.

== Reception ==
=== Ratings ===
In its original broadcast, "Kanes and Abel's" received 2.78 million viewers, ranking 105th of 122 in the weekly rankings and marking an increase in 450,000 viewers.

=== Reviews ===
The episode received primarily positive reviews. Television Without Pity gave the episode a "B". Rowan Kaiser, writing for The A.V. Club, praised Veronica's ethical ambiguity in the episode as a story device. "The result to take away here is that no matter what, the structures of power are set up that our perky blonde detective heroine can't really win. She can succeed. She can get close. But achieving a satisfactory result? In the world of the '09ers, that appears to be impossible."

Price Peterson, writing for TV.com, gave a relatively positive review. "I was so relieved that this episode solved one of my biggest annoyances of the show so far—Keith's reluctance to involve Veronica." However, the reviewer also wrote that "[he wasn't] sure if he cared too much about Sabrina's plight."
