= Meet John Smith =

- Veronica Mars episode
- Duncan (Teddy Dunn) has a hallucination of his dead sister, Lilly (Amanda Seyfried).
- Episode no.: Season 1 Episode 3
- Directed by: Harry Winer
- Written by: Jed Seidel
- Production code: 2T5702
- Original air date: October 12, 2004

Guest appearances
- Melissa Leo as Julia/"John Smith"; Aaron Ashmore as Troy Vandegraff; Lisa Thornhill as Celeste Kane; Amanda Seyfried as Lilly Kane; Bobby Edner as Justin Smith; Paula Marshall as Rebecca James; Kyle Secor as Jake Kane

Episode chronology
← Previous "Credit Where Credit's Due"	Next → "The Wrath of Con"
- Veronica Mars season 1

"Meet John Smith" is the third episode of the first season of the American mystery television series Veronica Mars. The episode, written by Jed Seidel and directed by Harry Winer, premiered on UPN on October 12, 2004.

The series depicts the adventures of Veronica Mars (Kristen Bell) as she deals with life as a high school student while moonlighting as a private detective. In this episode, Veronica helps a boy, Justin Smith (Bobby Edner) track down his long-lost father. In addition, Veronica starts a relationship with Troy (Aaron Ashmore), and Duncan Kane (Teddy Dunn) starts experiencing severe mental difficulties after he stops taking his antidepressants.

== Synopsis ==
After a group of boys point out Veronica and call her a "9," Troy Vandegraff comes up to her and invites her on a trip on his father's boat. After a running schoolmate knocks Veronica's books out of her hands, Duncan Kane helps her pick them up. After school, Keith Mars (Enrico Colantoni) questions Veronica about why her guidance counselor called that day. Veronica dodges his questions and tells him her realization that her mother was having an affair with Jake Kane (Kyle Secor). Meanwhile, Duncan is getting annoyed with his parents, especially Jake, who is pressuring him academically. The next morning, Veronica wakes up from a dream in which she is making out with Duncan.

Veronica and Keith go to a video store, and Veronica sees one of the boys who was talking about her earlier, Justin Smith. Meanwhile, it is revealed that Duncan has been taking antidepressants for roughly six months. Veronica accepts Troy's proposal to go out, while Duncan talks with Logan (Jason Dohring) about his disappointment towards his new girlfriend, Shelly. Veronica drags Justin into the women's bathroom, where he tells her that he wants her help in finding his long-lost father. Justin is unable to produce any valuable information about him besides that his name is John Smith. Meanwhile, the guidance counselor, Rebecca James (Paula Marshall) meets with Keith and tells him that Veronica talks back to teachers, is late, and is socially isolated. Keith retorts by saying that nothing is wrong with his daughter. At dinner that night, Jake laughs at how Duncan is planning to get a life coach. Duncan angrily pushes back at his parents.

The next day, Keith meets Wallace (Percy Daggs III) and Veronica tells Keith about her investigations. Veronica asks Wallace to steal guidance counselor records for him. Meanwhile, Duncan has stopped taking his medication. In addition, Justin hands Veronica a mixtape, hinting romantic intentions. Veronica and Troy are having a good time on their date. However, Troy becomes a little too aggressive and Veronica pulls away from his attempts to kiss her. She looks after him in despair. As she wonders what's wrong with her, the camera cuts to Duncan and his new girlfriend making out in a car. However, he accidentally calls her "Veronica." Wallace retrieves Justin's guidance counselor file, which contains records that his father died when he was in first grade. However, Justin soon receives a note from his father, leaving a contradiction.

Later, Justin visits Veronica and requests her help once again. She accepts. She reopens investigations and makes progress. The next day, Veronica talks to Troy again. When Logan makes a quip to Duncan about Veronica, Duncan gets aggressive. He sees Veronica and Troy talking (and eventually kissing), and flips over the side of the bleachers in anger and jealousy. Veronica takes Duncan to the hospital. Jake questions Duncan about how his accident happened, but Duncan asks his father to leave so he can talk to the doctor himself. Their whole conversation is not shown, but Duncan tells him about his refusal to take the antidepressants. Keith visits the guidance counselor and asks her to talk to Veronica.

Veronica shares her pictures of the three John Smiths who live in San Diego to Justin. Justin possibly recognizes the third picture, and Veronica reports that he is a petty criminal. After school, Veronica and Justin follow his father. Justin dashes out to "John Smith 3" and realizes that it is not his father, even though the two share the same handwriting. Meanwhile, Duncan has hallucinations of Lilly (Amanda Seyfried) as a result of his withdrawal from the medication. Veronica and Justin follow John Smith to his house. Veronica pokes her nose into the house and sneaks into the garage. Although the man denies having a son, a woman (Melissa Leo) soon pulls into the driveway. In fact, it is Justin's father, who it is revealed is a trans woman, now called Julia. They talk in the driveway, and Justin leaves feeling hurt and confused after saying a few hurtful things to Julia. In the car on the way home, Veronica comforts Justin, pointing out that Julia drives 90 miles each way just to see Justin while he works at the video store.

Veronica soon enough decides to go try to find her mother in Arizona. Meanwhile, Duncan starts taking his antidepressants again. The next day, when Duncan encounters Veronica, he returns to his old, withdrawn self. Keith goes on a coffee date with Rebecca. Justin reconnects with his parent through his video store job. Veronica visits the apartment where her mother stayed, but runs into an old college friend of hers, who does not provide any useful information. In addition, Veronica visits Troy, who embraces her.

== Cultural references ==
Because several scenes in the episode take place in a video store, several movies are referenced:

- Julia asks for The Matrix Reloaded.
- Julia says that she enjoyed the noir film Consenting Adults. Justin then recommends Body Heat.
- Keith mentions The Cowboys when he is renting a movie with Veronica.
- Keith also mentions Slap Shot.
- Justin makes a reference to Marlene Dietrich.

In addition, several other cultural references are made:

- Duncan sings part of "Summer Nights" when he is on the bleachers.
- Troy hits his fist on the jukebox during his date with Veronica, referencing a move created by the character Fonzie from the sitcom Happy Days.

== Arc significance ==
- Veronica tries to find her mother.
- Going cold turkey from his medications, Duncan hallucinates Lilly telling him that the secret of what really happened the day she was murdered will come out.

== Music ==
In addition to the series' theme song, "We Used to Be Friends", by The Dandy Warhols, the following songs are heard in the episode:

- "No Blue Sky" by The Thorns
- "Art" by Louque
- "Goodbye World" by Luke Adams
- "Edge of the Ocean" by Ivy
- "Rock and a Hard Place" by Supreme Beings of Leisure
- "What Are You Afraid Of?" by West Indian Girl

== Production ==
The episode was written by Jed Seidel and directed by Harry Winer. Series regulars Eli "Weevil" Navarro (Francis Capra) and Mallory Dent (Sydney Tamiia Poitier) do not appear in "Meet John Smith." The episode features the first appearance of recurring character Rebecca James, the school guidance counselor. In addition, future Oscar winner Melissa Leo guest stars as Justin's biological father. This episode's title refers to Justin searching for and eventually finding and meeting his father, John Smith, who is now called Julia.

== Reception ==
=== Ratings ===
In its original broadcast, the episode was watched by 2.71 million viewers, ranking tied for 95 of 101 in the weekly rankings.

=== Reviews ===
The episode received very positive reviews, with many commenting favorably on how the episode handled transgender issues. Rowan Kaiser of The A.V. Club praised Duncan's characterization in the episode, stating that " 'Meet John Smith' fulfills the important role of introducing Duncan Kane as a character instead of simply a symbol of what Veronica lost after Lily [sic] Kane's murder." She also wrote that "[he] admires the maturity with which the show handled the potentially hot-button issue of transgendered people and transphobia."

Price Peterson of TV.com lauded the episode. His episode verdict stated, "This [episode] was not only packed with mystery and satisfying reveals, it approached My So-Called Life levels of teen angst. So good."

Laura Prudom of TV Fanatic gave the episode a 4.5 of 5. She also praised the handling of Justin's mother's transition. " 'Meet John Smith' was reassuringly judgement free about the exploration of gender identity, illustrating the value of looking beyond the surface of a person or situation before rushing to judgement, while resisting the urge to be preachy or condescending. If only more shows could treat LGBT issues so respectfully."
