= The Wrath of Con =

- Veronica Mars episode
- Weevil (Francis Capra) cries after viewing Lilly Kane's (Amanda Seyfried) memorial video.
- Episode no.: Season 1 Episode 4
- Directed by: Michael Fields
- Written by: Diane Ruggiero
- Production code: 2T5703
- Original air date: October 19, 2004

Guest appearances
- Kyla Pratt as Georgia; Aaron Ashmore as Troy Vandegraff; Lisa Thornhill as Celeste Kane; Amanda Seyfried as Lilly Kane; Adam Wylie as Grant Winters; Robert Baker as Liam; Alexander Scarlis as Jimmy Spain/"Karl"; Kyle Secor as Jake Kane

Episode chronology
← Previous "Meet John Smith"	Next → "You Think You Know Somebody"
- Veronica Mars season 1

"The Wrath of Con" is the fourth episode of the first season of the American mystery television series Veronica Mars. Written by Diane Ruggiero and directed by Michael Fields, the episode premiered on UPN on October 19, 2004.

The series depicts the adventures of Veronica Mars (Kristen Bell) as she deals with life as a high school student while moonlighting as a private detective. In this episode, Veronica helps Wallace's (Percy Daggs III) new girlfriend, Georgia, when she is cheated out of $6,000 in a confidence scam by the "Silicon Mafia". Meanwhile, Logan (Jason Dohring) makes a video memorial of Lilly (Amanda Seyfried) for a memorial ceremony at the school to dedicate a fountain in her name.

== Plot ==
Veronica and Troy (Aaron Ashmore) are kissing outside of her house and asks her to the homecoming dance. After they say goodbye, Veronica goes in and playfully confronts Keith (Enrico Colantoni) about tracking Troy. He denies it. In a flashback, Lilly helps Veronica pick out a dress for homecoming. The next day, Wallace and his new friend Georgia (Kyla Pratt) talk to Veronica about starting an investigation—Georgia has received an email from a stranger, Karl, requesting money to help out with a gambling problem. Georgia reveals that she actually gave him the money, but he is late on paying it back. Veronica attempts to catch the person in a disguise.

Later, Troy invites Veronica on a date, and she accepts his invitation to the dance. In another flashback, Logan, Duncan (Teddy Dunn), Lilly, and Veronica pose for pictures before the same dance the previous year. Veronica soon receives a call from Karl. At the meeting, Georgia does not recognize the man (Alexander Scarlis) who appears. They decide to meet back tomorrow after Veronica doesn't have the money in cash. After, Veronica confronts the man and finds out that the man's real name is Jimmy Spain, who has played a role named "Karl" in another supposed "project." After the show, Karl comes up to her and attempts to con her, after which she questions him. He reveals that he is actually taking part in a reality show called "Duped!" in which he and others con people while it is all being caught on camera. Veronica tells him it is a scam, and he gives her the phone number of the people who auditioned him. Wallace tells her it is the number of a video game club.

Veronica walks into the club in full costume. Veronica soon finds a gamer's username which matches the email address ("Grrrantastic"). Veronica takes "Grrrantastic"'s ID and figures out that he is a college student at San Diego State University. Afterwards, Veronica talks with Wallace while they are preparing for a fake college interview, who tells her that he has a crush on Georgia. In a flashback, Veronica, Logan, Duncan, and Lilly play Truth or Dare?. Wallace and Veronica are taken to an SDSU party, where the host tells them that "Grrrantastic" (Grant) and one other person, Liam, are known as the "Silicon Mafia." Veronica snatches the key to the partners' room, and she also posts the picture of the actor on the wall. Both instances prove a connection between the "Mafia" and Georgia.

The next day, Veronica finds Logan looking at old videos of Lilly while assembling a memorial video. In a flashback, the group plays Never Have I Ever. Veronica's statement is that she has never gone skinny dipping. Keith forcibly works his way into the "Silicon Mafia" 's lair, although his real objective is to plant an audio recorder, which he does. Veronica finds out the passcode to their alarm system. Meanwhile, Keith and Troy have an awkward talk, during which Keith tells Troy that he cancelled his surprise reservation for Veronica at the Four Seasons. Keith traps the "Mafia" by telling them that he will give them an advance screening of a new game. After the distraction is complete, Veronica sneaks into the dorm. She reveals in a voiceover that they are making money off a video game they are creating through conning people. She completely disassembles their console. The two come back and see that Veronica has completely foiled their plan and escaped. They then pay the money back in exchange for knowledge of where their equipment is. Georgia kisses Wallace.

At Lilly's memorial service, Celeste (Lisa Thornhill) makes a speech before the fountain is revealed and the video plays. However, at the end of the video, Logan has put footage of the chaotic night of the dance, which the students enjoy. Afterwards, Weevil (Francis Capra) is shown to be crying. The night of the homecoming dance, Veronica stops the car and goes skinny dipping, fulfilling her promise made to Lilly on the corresponding night in the past.

== Arc significance ==
- Weevil cries after Lilly's video memorial is shown.

== Production ==
This episode was actress Kristen Bell's favorite episode as of 2006. Series regular Sydney Tamiia Poitier (Mallory Dent) does not appear in this episode. This episode's title is a tongue-in-cheek reference to the classic science fiction film Star Trek II: The Wrath of Khan.

== Music ==
The following music can be heard in the episode:

- "Supernatural Supergirl" by Josh Kramon
- "Everything" by Josh Kramon
- "All That We Perceive" by Thievery Corporation
- "Diverse City" by Toby Mac
- "Party Crashers" by Radio 4
- "Now Is the Time" by Damone

== Reception ==
=== Ratings ===
In its original broadcast, the episode was watched by 3.12 million viewers, ranking 98 of 107 in the weekly rankings.

=== Reviews ===
Rowan Kaiser, writing for The A.V. Club, praised the episode. She notes that the episode contained the "single moment when Veronica Mars got its claws into me". She also stated that "[t]here was comedy, drama, ridiculousness, and important character beats yes, but there was also a driving momentum that screamed 'Veronica Mars can be a great show!' " Price Peterson, writing for TV.com, gave the episode a mixed review. He stated that while Lilly "seemed kind of obnoxious," the scene at the end of the episode was a "truly memorable and touching moment."

Sally Tamarkin, writing for Slate, praised the episode and said that it got the viewer hooked on the show. " 'The Wrath of Con' showcases Veronica’s most salient qualities: her fierce loyalty to friends, her commitment to fairness and justice, and her wisecracking badassedness." The reviewer went on to state that " 'The Wrath of Con' is illustrative of a couple of other things that make the show great. Veronica Mars routinely plumbs emotional depths while avoiding cringey sentimentality. Veronica’s relationship with her dad and her BFF-ship with Wallace are tender but not uncomplicated, and the sweetness of the moments they share are cut with humor."

Author Rhonda Wilcox notes the "I never" game flashback in which Duncan and Veronica admit to being virgins, and the dream sequences from this episode in her discussions of the show. John Ramos, writing in Neptune Noir: Unauthorized Investigations Into Veronica Mars, notes the episode as one where Keith has lied to aid Veronica. The episode has been referenced in multiple graduate theses.
