= Credit Where Credit's Due =

- Veronica Mars episode
- Episode no.: Season 1 Episode 2
- Directed by: Mark Piznarski
- Written by: Rob Thomas
- Production code: 2T5701
- Original air date: September 28, 2004

Guest appearances
- Paris Hilton as Caitlin Ford; Michael Muhney as Don Lamb; Amanda Seyfried as Lilly Kane; Aaron Ashmore as Troy Vandegraff; Wilmer Calderon as Chardo Navarro; Irene Olga Lopez as Leticia Navarro; Daran Norris as Cliff McCormack; Kyle Secor as Jake Kane

Episode chronology
← Previous "Pilot"	Next → "Meet John Smith"
- Veronica Mars season 1

"Credit Where Credit's Due" is the second episode of the first season of the American mystery television series Veronica Mars. It was written by series creator Rob Thomas, and directed by Mark Piznarski who also directed the pilot. The episode originally aired on UPN on September 28, 2004.

The series depicts the adventures of Veronica Mars (Kristen Bell) as she deals with life as a high school student, while moonlighting as a private detective. In this episode, Veronica's newfound friend Weevil (Francis Capra) is arrested for credit card fraud, and she goes on the case to figure out who actually did the crime.

== Synopsis ==
Veronica is talking with Wallace Fennel (Percy Daggs III) in the halls of the high school. Wallace finds an invite to an 09-er party. With some help from Veronica, he deciphers the code which states when and where it will take place. At the party, Logan Echolls (Jason Dohring) and Duncan Kane (Teddy Dunn) interact with other popular students. Weevil bursts onto the scene and gets into an argument with Logan because Weevil normally uses the beach. As the debate becomes increasingly heated, the Sheriff's department appears and the partygoers quickly disperse before they have to show IDs.

The next day, Weevil is approached by the Sheriff's department, who arrest his grandmother on charges of credit card fraud, even though they actually believe it was Weevil who committed the crime. Afterwards, Mrs. Navarro's lawyer visits Keith Mars (Enrico Colantoni) and expresses his belief that it was Weevil who stole the credit card. Veronica states that Logan framed Weevil, but she is dismissed by the other two. The Mars family goes on the case. Veronica visits Weevil to find out more, but he rebuffs her questions. While Veronica and Keith are at a diner, Don Lamb sits down at their table and berates him for the handling of Lilly Kane's (Amanda Seyfried) murder one year earlier. Offended, Keith retorts and the two argue. Then, Veronica goes to a newspaper class with Mallory Dent (Sydney Tamiia Poitier) after telling Wallace to copy Weevil's attendance records. Her first assignment is to do a story with her ex-boyfriend, Duncan.

Veronica finds proof that Weevil is not guilty, but Keith tells her that Weevil has already confessed. Veronica also finds a correlation between Logan's web history and the credit card charges. Veronica's car also has a flat tire. Troy Vandegraff (Aaron Ashmore) helps her, to the chagrin of his popular friends. Duncan comes and offers Veronica a ride to the beach, where they are doing their story. The awkward car ride is juxtaposed with a flashback of a similar car ride between Veronica and Lilly. After Veronica and Duncan do the story, they are stopped by a police car on the way home. It mysteriously comes to light that the car (which was Lilly's) had many tickets on it that were not paid and is about to be impounded. As Keith and Jake Kane (Kyle Secor) come to pick up their respective children, a tense moment occurs. A flashback describes in detail Keith's accusation of Jake as the murderer of Lilly Kane.

On the ride home, Veronica asks for Keith's help in investigating Weevil's crime. The two put on an act—Veronica feigns pregnancy and asks the concierge whether or not there they can track the credit card number (which she hands to the concierge). They hand back the bill summary and Veronica deduces that Logan's girlfriend, Caitlin (Paris Hilton) paid for room service on the Echolls family credit card one night. Troy invites Veronica to a party, despite knowing about her exclusion from the popular group. Veronica calls the numbers on the credit card summary. When one of the phones is busy, she asks her dad to run a check on it. Meanwhile, Weevil's cousin Chardo (Wilmer Calderon) threatens Logan. Veronica then pressures Weevil's cousin into confessing that he was behind the fraud, which he confirms. He was also secretly carrying on an affair with Caitlin, thus explaining the room service bill.

Veronica confronts Mrs. Navarro and explains how Chardo spent the credit card taking out Caitlin. Mrs. Navarro then gives up Chardo after realizing that he was taking out a spoiled teenager. Weevil is released. Both Logan's friends and the motorcycle gang are now after Chardo. Logan's group reaches him first, but Weevil agrees with Logan to release him. Although Chardo first believes that Weevil saved him, the leader soon lets his henchmen beat up his cousin for putting him in jail. Veronica confronts her dad about why he accused Jake Kane. Although he doesn't tell her why, she begins to suspect that the Kanes may actually have had a role in the murder. In addition, Veronica sees that Logan and Caitlin have broken up.

== Cultural references ==
The following cultural references are made in the episode:

- Duncan references "Gettin' Jiggy wit It".
- The episode references Torrey Pines Golf Course.
- Veronica says "Smell ya later," a catchphrase of Nelson Muntz.
- Wallace talks about James Bond.
- Veronica mentions Charlie's Angels.
- In flashback's, Lilly says that she reads Sassy.
- Veronica and Wallace use phrases common in Blaxploitation films.

== Music ==
In addition to the series's theme song, "We Used to Be Friends", by The Dandy Warhols, the following music can be heard in the episode:

- "Word Up!" by Korn
- "Hi Lo" by Under the Influence of Giants
- "Troubled Times" by Fountains of Wayne
- "Here It Comes" by Longwave
- "Lover" by Maureen Davis

== Production ==
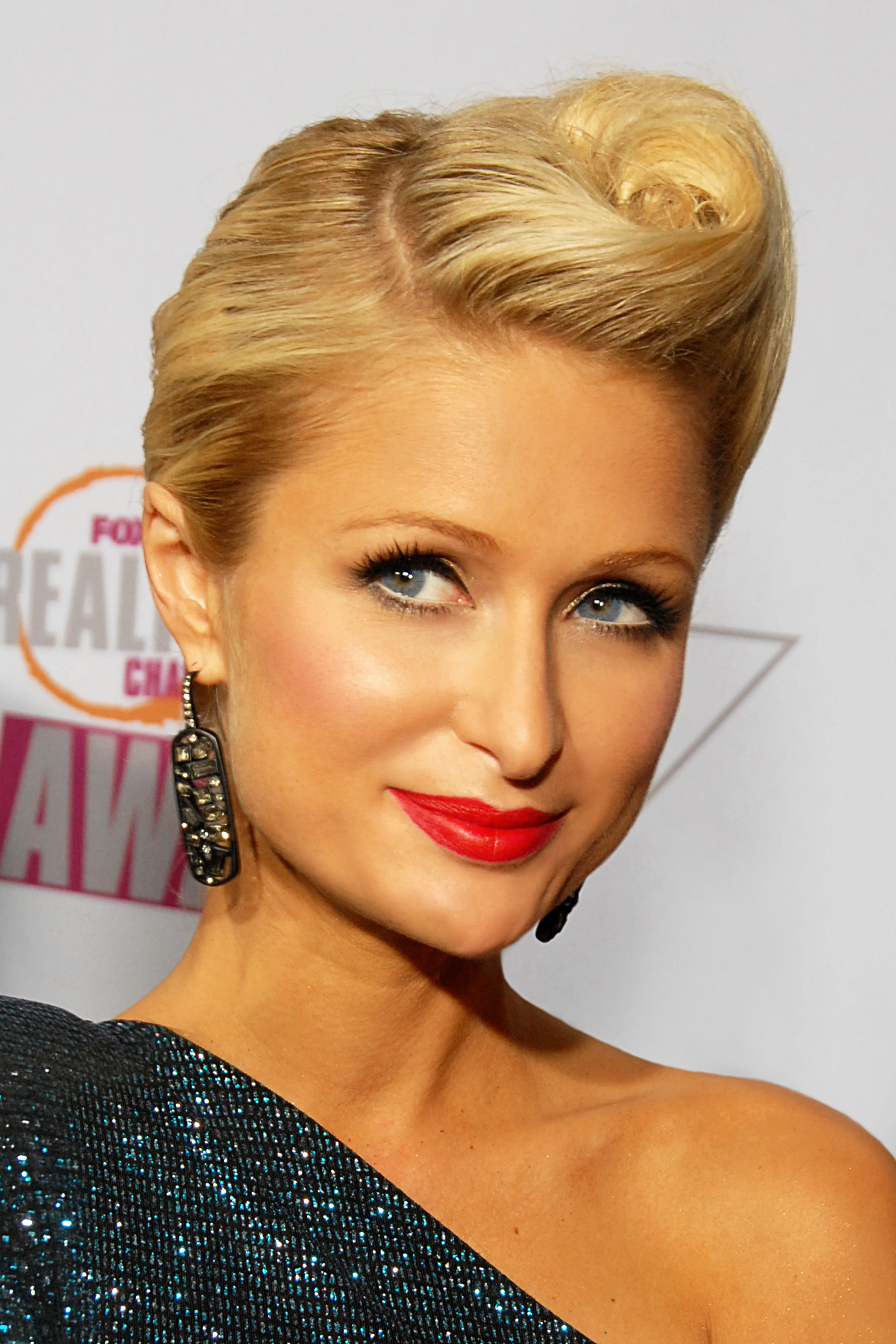
Paris Hilton guest starred in the episode.

The episode was written by Rob Thomas and directed by Mark Piznarski, the same creative team who wrote and directed the pilot. The episode's title is a play on words: "Give credit where credit's due" is a phrase, and the episode is about credit card fraud. "Credit Where Credit's Due" features the first appearance (a small cameo) by Dick Casablancas (Ryan Hansen), who would later become a series regular the following season. On casting the character, Thomas elaborated, "[w]e hired him because we liked his look; he looked like a blond California surfer boy." The character was created so that Logan would have another friend besides Duncan. The writers came up with Dick's name through referring to the character as "a dick".

The episode featured several guest stars, including socialite Paris Hilton as Logan's girlfriend, Caitlin. Hilton was already a celebrity when the episode aired. Fans often treat her guest appearance as out of character for the show.

== Reception ==
=== Ratings ===
"Credit Where Credit's Due" was watched by 2.21 million viewers in its initial broadcast, ranking 113 of 116 in the weekly rankings.

=== Reviews ===
The episode received mixed to positive reviews. Television Without Pity gave the episode a "B+".

Rowan Kaiser of The A.V. Club commented negatively on Paris Hilton's guest role, stating that "[t]he case-of-the-week gets disrupted simply because her presence is awkward," and goes on to state that the episode is awkward even without Hilton's appearance. However, the reviewer also states that "[t]here's still a lot to like here, especially as the episode progresses and the characters fall into more comfortable beats."

Price Peterson of TV.com gave the episode a positive review, stating that "the episode was redeemed by Veronica's high school experiences," and that "her awkward ride home with Duncan in this episode was particularly great."
