= Pilot (Veronica Mars) =

Pilot episode of Veronica Mars

- Veronica Mars episode
- Veronica Mars (Kristen Bell) cuts down Wallace Fennel (Percy Daggs III) from the school flag pole
- Episode no.: Season 1 Episode 1
- Directed by: Mark Piznarski
- Written by: Rob Thomas
- Production code: 475258
- Original air date: September 22, 2004

Guest appearances
- Michael Muhney as Don Lamb; Corinne Bohrer as Lianne Mars; Amanda Seyfried as Lilly Kane; Lisa Thornhill as Celeste Kane; Kyle Secor as Jake Kane; Daran Norris as Cliff McCormack; Brandon Hillock as Jerry Sacks; Duane Daniels as Van Clemmons

Episode chronology
← Previous —	Next → "Credit Where Credit's Due"
- Veronica Mars season 1

The pilot episode of the television series Veronica Mars premiered on UPN on September 22, 2004. It was written by series creator Rob Thomas, and directed by Mark Piznarski. Set in the fictional town of Neptune, the pilot introduces Kristen Bell as the title character, a high-school student moonlighting as a private investigator under the wing of her detective father. Two separate mysteries are presented in the episode, which are explored throughout the season and resolved in the final and penultimate episodes.

Thomas originally wrote Veronica Mars as a young adult novel, featuring a male as the protagonist. He changed the gender of the protagonist because he thought a noir piece told from a female point of view would be more interesting and unique. The original pilot script was darker in tone than the one filmed, and several details were changed. Although it ranked low in the ratings, the pilot was critically acclaimed and Bell's performance as the protagonist was praised.

== Plot ==
Flashbacks reveal Veronica's backstory: in small-town Neptune, California, Veronica – daughter of well-respected County Sheriff Keith Mars (Enrico Colantoni) is a typical teen who was dating Duncan Kane (Teddy Dunn), and was popular with loving parents. But when her best friend and Duncan's sister, Lilly Kane (Amanda Seyfried), is murdered, Veronica's life falls apart. Keith accuses software billionaire Jake Kane (Kyle Secor), Lilly's father, of being involved in the murder. This provokes Neptune's wrath, and Keith is ousted from office and replaced by Don Lamb (Michael Muhney) in a recall election. Veronica's mother, Lianne Mars (Corinne Bohrer), unable to face the loss of status and economic security, develops a drinking problem and suddenly leaves town. Veronica's boyfriend also ends their relationship, and her friends turn their backs on her. To prove that she is unaffected by the rejection, Veronica attends wealthy classmate Shelly Pomroy's "09er" party. Her drink is spiked with GHB and she is raped, but Sheriff Lamb refuses to take her report seriously. These events shock Veronica and she changes her attitude towards her former friends, becoming tough and cynical.

Estranged from all her "09er" friends—wealthy students from the fictional 90909 ZIP code—including Duncan and Lilly's ex-boyfriend, Logan Echolls (Jason Dohring), and feeling the drop in income and status that her father's dismissal from office brings, Veronica takes a part-time job in her father's newly opened private investigation agency, Mars Investigations. Although the case of Lilly's murder is officially closed following the confession of a former Kane Software employee, Abel Koontz (Christian Clemenson), Veronica continues her own investigation into what happened. Her investigation discovers new evidence which suggests that Koontz is innocent.

In the present, Veronica starts her Junior year at Neptune High by freeing new student Wallace Fennel (Percy Daggs III), who had been stripped and duct-taped to the school flag pole. Wallace explains that while working at the local Sac-n-Pac, he alerted the sheriff's department to two PCH (Pacific Coast Highway) bikers who took alcohol without paying. Sheriff Lamb exposes Wallace as the witness, and despite Wallace's attempts to retract his accusation, Lamb walks away with proof from the in-store video camera. Wallace's duct-taping is PCH retribution for his honesty. In a convoluted scheme to help Wallace, Veronica sets up Logan by placing a bong in his locker. Once the bong is taken to the evidence room at the sheriff's department, Veronica triggers it to smoke and spark by remote control, leading to the arrival of the fire department. The fire chief, a friend of Veronica, switches the video from the Sac-n-Pac with one Veronica filmed of a deputy receiving sexual favors. When the bikers are in court, that video is shown instead, embarrassing Lamb and undermining the case against the bikers. Wallace is forgiven and Eli "Weevil" Navarro (Francis Capra), the bikers' leader, becomes Veronica's occasional ally.

At Mars Investigations, Duncan and Lilly's mother, Celeste Kane (Lisa Thornhill) hires Keith to ascertain if her husband Jake is having an affair, despite her open contempt for both Keith and Veronica. Keith is busy with other projects, and Veronica takes it upon herself to follow Jake. Veronica takes photos of him at the Camelot hotel as he meets with an unseen woman after midnight. Once Keith sees the license plate number of the woman's car, he stops the investigation and files the photograph. Puzzled by his actions, Veronica finds the file and learns that Keith has continued his own personal investigation of Lilly's murder. Veronica discovers that the car belongs to her missing mother, Lianne, and begins to investigate the murder herself.

== Production ==
=== Conception ===
Rob Thomas originally wrote Veronica Mars as a young adult novel for publishing company Simon & Schuster. Prior to his first television job on Dawson's Creek, Thomas sold two novel ideas. One of these was provisionally titled Untitled Rob Thomas Teen Detective Novel, which formed the basis for the series. The novel had many elements similar to Veronica Mars, however the protagonist was male. Thomas's father was a vice-principal at Westlake High School in Austin, Texas, and the main character attended a "thinly disguised version" of the school. As Thomas had begun writing for film and television, he did not resume his teen detective idea for several years. Writing a novel could take months for Thomas, whereas a television script only took several weeks. Knowing that television scripts paid more, Thomas wrote the television version of the teen detective project as a spec script before it became a novel. Since no studio or network had asked him to write it, and he would not get paid unless it sold, Thomas said that "it was never a very pressing project for me". Tinkering with it from time to time, Thomas wrote project notes a year before he actually started writing the television script. Most of his original ideas made it into the script, but some changed drastically. Thomas wanted to use flashbacks, and he had to shorten the timeline so that the murder could happen in a recent time. Thomas changed the gender of the protagonist because he thought a noir piece told from a female point of view would be more interesting and unique.

=== Casting ===
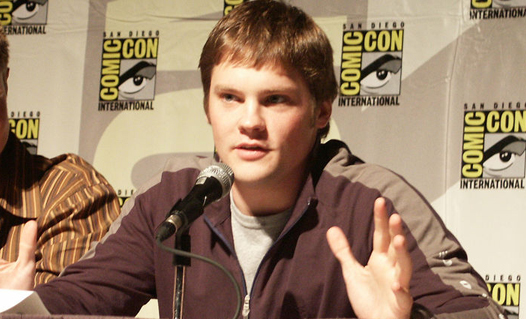
Teddy Dunn, who portrayed Duncan Kane, originally auditioned for the role of Logan Echolls.

Kristen Bell was chosen to portray Veronica Mars from more than 500 women who auditioned for the role. On casting the lead role, Thomas later commented, "When you're casting 20-year-old hot girl, you see a lot of bad actors." Bell felt that it was "just luck" that Rob Thomas saw that "I have some sass to me, and that's exactly what he wanted". Bell thought that it was her cheerleader looks and an outsider's attitude that set her apart from the other women who auditioned. Bell's life shared many similarities with that of her character—her father had "an investigative bent", and her best friend died in high school in a car crash.

Jason Dohring, who played Logan Echolls, originally auditioned for the role of Duncan Kane. Teddy Dunn originally auditioned for Logan, but ended up portraying Duncan Kane. Dohring felt that his audition for Duncan "was a little dark", and he was told by the producers that it was "not really right". The producers asked Dohring to read for the role of Logan, which involved reading Duncan's lines. Dohring acted one scene from the pilot, in which he shattered the headlights of a car with a crowbar. During the final auditions, Dohring read two times with Bell and met with the studio and the network. When reading with Bell, Dohring acted the whole scene as if he had raped her, and tried to give the character an evil and fun feel. At the time of Dohring's audition for Logan, the character was only going to be a guest star in the pilot.

Percy Daggs III auditioned for the role of Wallace Fennel twice before being cast, and he had to go through three tests with the studio and network executives. During his first audition, Daggs read four scenes from the pilot. Before his studio test, Daggs read with Bell and had "a great conversation". He said that she "made me feel comfortable about auditioning" and was a big reason why he became more comfortable playing Wallace as the season went on. Thomas described Amanda Seyfried, who portrayed the murdered Lilly Kane, as "the biggest surprise of the year". When casting a series regular, he was able to see all the best actors in town, mainly because they all wanted to be a series regular. When casting Lilly, who would only appear from time-to-time as "the dead girl", Thomas did not receive the same level of actors. Thomas said that he had "never had a more cut and dried audition" than he did with Seyfried; she was "about 100 times better than anyone else that we saw, she was just spectacular". He said that she ended up being so good in the series that he used her three or four times more than he initially planned.

=== Filming ===
The original pilot script was darker in tone than the one filmed. Thomas intended to take the script to FX, HBO or Showtime, but gave UPN "credit" as they only wanted it a bit lighter to match their standards and practices. There was also a lengthy debate as to whether Veronica could be a rape victim; UPN eventually consented. In the aired version of the episode, Lilly Kane was found by the pool in the same spot where she was murdered. However, Thomas stated that Lilly's body was originally going to be found in the ocean, and he had a plan for events which led to Lilly's body being dumped. When Thomas pitched the idea to UPN, the network felt that it was "too dark and creepy" for Jake Kane to dispose of his daughter's body to protect his son, and the idea was changed. Much of the series' scenes were filmed at Stu Segall Productions in San Diego. During the filming of the pilot, producer Paul Kurta said that much of the filming would take place in Oceanside, California. Kurta liked that it was "a seaside town that still feels like middle-class people live there ... Most of the seaside towns feel resort driven." The setting of Neptune High, which was featured in the first two seasons, was also located in Oceanside. The school, Oceanside High School, was paid $7,750 by Stu Segall Productions for the use of the campus and extras. When Thomas watched the final cut of the scene in which Veronica realizes that she has been raped, Thomas thought that he had cast the role correctly. "I’m watching her from the monitor, and tears start streaming down her face, and I’m just like, 'Holy shit! We have a star!'"

== Music ==
"We Used to Be Friends" by The Dandy Warhols was used as the series' theme song. Composer Josh Kramon was originally going to produce a noir version of an '80s song for the theme. However, Rob Thomas was "pretty much set on finding a song", and "We Used to Be Friends" was chosen right from the beginning. Kramon wrote the original background music to convey the film noir themes. For the pilot, Thomas wanted "a really atmospheric, kind of modern noir type of vibe", and Kramon used sounds similar to that of Air and Zero 7. Kramon used "traditional sounds" for the series, but also processed and filtered them. Among the instruments used were piano, vibraphone and guitar. When using an acoustic piano, Kramon would use compression so that it did not sound like a traditional piano. Live bass and percussion was also used, as Kramon did not like to program them. The main instrument used was guitar, but Kramon felt that piano was "by far the most important instrument for working on TV shows, especially when you're doing everything yourself." A week before choosing the sounds for the pilot, the crew had a "spotting session", where they would discuss with Thomas and the producers which type of music was going to be featured. Kramon did not decide the songs to be featured, but composed and created the whole score. Since there was little orchestral music, and Kramon could play guitar, piano, bass and drums, he played the whole score without hiring a musician.

=== Other songs heard in this episode ===
- "La Femme d'Argent" by Air
- "What You Want" by The Wayouts
- "Insincere Because I" by The Dandy Warhols
- "Sittin' On Top Of The World" by Botany Boyz
- "Just Another" by Pete Yorn
- "White Lines (Don't Do It)" by Grandmaster Flash
- "Give You More" by Taxi Doll
- "Girls" by Death In Vegas
- "Bathroom Stall" by DAMe Lee
- "Weak Become Heroes" by The Streets
- "(Don't Fear) The Reaper" by Blue Öyster Cult
- "Pata Pata" by Miriam Makeba
- "Cemetery Party" by Air
- "Atomic Girl" by The Wannabes
- "Butterflies" by Davíd Garza

== Reception ==
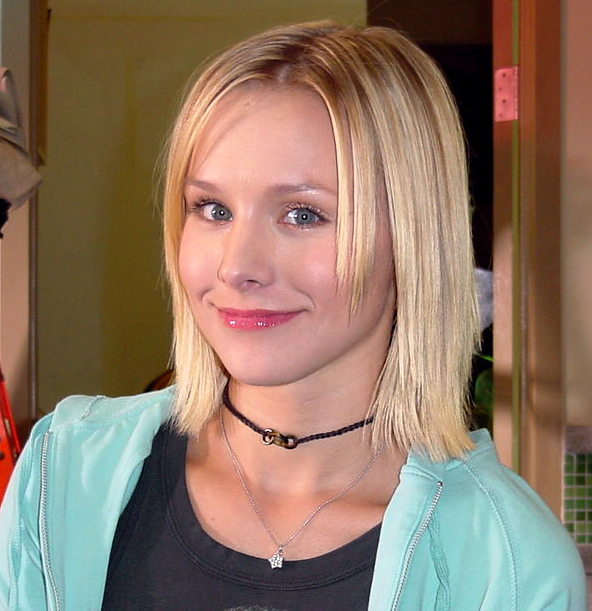
Kristen Bell's performance was praised by many critics.

The pilot was viewed by an average of 2.49 million American viewers on its original broadcast, ranking 108 out of 112 in the weekly charts. Debra Leithauser and Amy Amatangelo of The Washington Post praised the pilot for relying "on strong storytelling and casting", but hoped that viewers would be able to follow the multiple storylines. Barry Garron of The Hollywood Reporter said that the pilot was "so cleverly constructed, the hero so engaging and complicated and the story so filled with great dialogue that I wonder how anyone can sustain this level of accomplishment." He said that the protagonist "has all the sass, strength, resolve and ingenuity of any of literature's classic detectives [...] and Bell is so convincing in the role that it all somehow makes perfect sense." He praised the pilot and Thomas' writing, saying it had "comedy, deathly serious drama, parody and danger, ingredients not typically mixed together", and said that "if future episodes are half as good, this still will be one of TV's bright spots". Kay McFadden of The Seattle Times felt that Veronica Mars was the best new series on UPN, and that the title character was potentially "this season's most interesting character creation". McFadden described the series as "Alias in its attitude, Raymond Chandler in its writing and The O.C. in its class-consciousness".

Phil Gallo of Variety called Veronica Mars "the smartest teen-oriented drama since Freaks and Geeks". He enjoyed Bell's acting, describing her "as charismatic as she is tough and intelligent, giving a multilayered perf that touches on simple 17-year-old insecurity and convincingly incorporates deeper issues concerning family, love and disappointment." Gallo discussed the pilot's reliance on flashbacks and voiceover, and felt that neither got in the way of the storytelling or felt too obvious. He praised Thomas' writing of the "fine script" and Piznarski's directing. Robert Bianco of USA Today felt that Veronica Mars was more akin to Buffy Summers than Nancy Drew, with "sharp wits, steely nerves and a wicked sense of humor". Bianco praised Bell's portrayal of the character, saying "whether you buy the idea of teen crime-solvers or not, there's no questioning Bell's credentials as a TV star." Melanie McFarland of the Seattle Post-Intelligencer said that the pilot was "showing signs of being network television's next Buffy", emanating from a tough, emotionally battered heroine. McFarland found the acting to be fantastic, and said that Bell and Colantoni "create a wonderful father-daughter dynamic". Samantha Bonar of the Los Angeles Times thought that the writing was clever, and praised Bell ability to channel charisma, smarts and frustration.

IGN rated the pilot episode 10th on its list of the top ten Veronica Mars episodes, writing that "The smooth introduction to all things Veronica makes you care for her instantly. Anyone wrestling with creating a female character who is multifaceted and real needs only to study Veronica. We see many different sides, and there isn't any stereotyping. They sell her tough exterior so well that even though Veronica has been through a pile of crap, you don't pity her – which is good, because she doesn't want it anyway."
