= Paula Marshall =

American actress

- Born: June 12, 1964 (age 62)
- Occupation: Actress
- Years active: 1990–present
- Spouse: Danny Nucci (m. 2003)
- Children: 1
- Relatives: Bob Marshall (brother)

Paula Marshall (born June 12, 1964) is an American actress.

== Career ==
In 1990, Marshall had a guest role as Iris West, the love interest of Flash (Barry Allen) in the pilot episode on The Flash. In 1991, she guest-starred on Superboy with a young Clark Kent before he called himself Superman, playing the villainous Christina Riley, a woman who is, in secret, a werewolf.

In 1992, Marshall had a three-episode guest role on The Wonder Years and later guest-starred on Seinfeld, Nash Bridges, Grapevine and Diagnosis: Murder. Later in 1992, she appeared in the movie Hellraiser III: Hell on Earth as Terri. In 1994, she got her first sitcom role on Wild Oats. In 1995, Marshall starred in the science fiction cult classic W.E.I.R.D. World, directed by William Maloneas, as Dr. Abby O'Reardon, an evil scientist who rejuvenates her boss (and later becomes his mother) and is bent on turning grown men into babies. After a few years in B movies, Marshall gained a role on 1997's Chicago Sons. The same year, she landed a recurring role on Spin City and starred with Bette Midler and Dennis Farina in the film That Old Feeling, where her character fell in love with the paparazzo played by Danny Nucci.

Marshall has been cast in several pilots that were not picked up, including the Elizabeth Lackey series Cooking Lessons and Rob Thomas's Sticks.

Marshall was on Rob Thomas's Cupid, premiering in 1998. It featured her as Dr. Claire Allen, a psychiatrist supervising a man named Trevor (Jeremy Piven) who thinks he is Cupid. Marshall then joined David E. Kelley's Snoops about an unconventional detective agency.

In 2000, Marshall returned to television screens: first with a three-episode guest appearance as a porn star and love interest for Jeremy (Joshua Malina) on Aaron Sorkin's Sports Night, and then in Cursed (a.k.a. The Weber Show). In 2002, she guest starred on Just Shoot Me! as the daughter of Nina Van Horn.

Hidden Hills was an offbeat comedy about three families in suburbia. Marshall also had a secondary role in the Steve Martin-Bonnie Hunt remake of Cheaper by the Dozen and a cameo appearance in Break a Leg, which starred her husband Danny Nucci.

In 2004, Marshall appeared in an episode of the TV show Miss Match, but the series was cancelled before it aired. In October, she had a four-episode role in Veronica Mars, (created by Rob Thomas), and she reprised the role toward the end of season two. Marshall's next main role came in the sitcom Out of Practice.

In 2007, Marshall appeared in the Showtime series Californication. She also was seen in the FX series Nip/Tuck as an insecure actress who dated Dr. Sean McNamara.

In 2008, Marshall joined the crime drama Shark as a recurring character.

Marshall starred on the CBS sitcom Gary Unmarried. She and Jay Mohr played a divorced couple sparring while trying to be loving parents to their two children. The show was her first to be picked up for a second season.

Marshall had a guest role in House, playing Julia, sister of Lisa Cuddy.

In 2012, Marshall guest starred in an episode of CSI: Crime Scene Investigation. She played the role of Kathy Veck, owner of an oil company.

In 2013, Marshall guest starred in two episodes of Two and a Half Men as Alan Harper's transgender girlfriend Paula.

In 2021, Marshall appeared in Walker as Gale Davidson, an enemy to Cordell Walker (Jared Padalecki) and his family.

== Personal life ==
Marshall is from Rockville, Maryland. She has been married to actor Danny Nucci since 2003, and the couple have a daughter.

She is the sister of Virginia politician Bob Marshall, who became widely known for proposing a "bathroom bill" (a law that would have limited transgender individuals access to public restrooms of their born sex) before his defeat by transgender candidate Danica Roem in the November 2017 state election. She has criticized her brother’s political policies.

== Filmography ==
=== Film ===
Year	Title	Role	Notes
1992	Hellraiser III: Hell on Earth	Terri/Dreamer Cenobite	
1993	Warlock: The Armageddon	Samantha Ellison	
1994	The New Age	Alison Gale	
1996	A Family Thing	Karen	
1997	That Old Feeling	Molly De Mora	
1997	A Gun, a Car, a Blonde	Deborah	
1998	Thursday	Christine	
2003	Cheaper by the Dozen	Tina Shenk	
2005	Break a Leg	Alice	
2007	I Know Who Killed Me	Marnie Toland	
2008	Helping Hand	Michelle	Short
2010	Miss Nobody	Cynthia Bardo	
2010	Greetings	Julie	Short
2015	Fathers & Daughters	Laura Garner	
2017	We Love You, Sally Carmichael!	Diane	
2021	Malignant	Beverly	

=== Television ===
Year	Title	Role	Notes
1989	One Life to Live	Kelly Weston	
1990	True Blue	Lisa	"Hickory, Dickory, Dock"
1990	Mancuso, F.B.I.	Eve	"Adamant Eve"
1990	The Flash	Iris West	"Pilot"
1991	Superboy	Christina Riley	"Werewolf"
1992	Grapevine	Fran	"The Fran and Joey Story"
1992	Life Goes On	Jill Gordon	"Love Letters", "Windows", "Babes in the Woods"
1992–93	The Wonder Years	Bonnie Douglas	"Wayne and Bonnie", "Let Nothing You Dismay", "New Years"
1993	Seinfeld	Sharon	"The Outing"
1993	Lost in the Wild	Jill Houston	TV film
1993	Full Eclipse	Liza	TV film
1993	A Perry Mason Mystery: The Case of the Wicked Wives	Margo / Debra Walters	TV film
1994	Diagnosis: Murder	Cindy Martin	"Flashdance with Death"
1994	Wild Oats	Shelly Thomas	Main role
1995	W.E.I.R.D. World	Dr. Abby O'Reardon	TV film
1996	Nash Bridges	Eve	"Home Invasion", "Night Train"
1997	The Single Guy	Isabella	"Grandfather Clause"
1997	Chicago Sons	Lindsay Sutton	Main role
1997–98	Spin City	Laurie Parres	Recurring role
1998–99	Cupid	Dr. Claire Allen	Main role
1999	Snoops	Dana Plant	Main role
2000	Sports Night	Jenny	"Celebrities", "The Local Weather", "The Fall of Ryan O'Brian"
2000–01	Cursed	Katie	Main role
2002	Just Shoot Me!	Chloe	"Nina Van Mom", "Nina Van Grandma"
2002–03	Hidden Hills	Dr. Janine Barber	Main role
2003	Miss Match	Kathryn Hammond	"Matchmaker, Matchmaker"
2003	Alligator Points	Emma	TV film
2004	Cooking Lessons	Brett	TV film
2004–06	Veronica Mars	Rebecca James	"Meet John Smith", "You Think You Know Somebody", "Clash of the Tritons", "I Am God"
2005–06	Out of Practice	Dr. Regina Barnes	Main role
2007	Manchild	Laura	TV film
2007–08	Nip/Tuck	Kate Tinsley	Recurring role
2007–08	Californication	Sonja	Recurring role
2008	Shark	Jordan Westlake	"Bar Fight", "Leaving Las Vegas", "One Hit Wonder"
2008	The Wife & Times of Teddy Berman	Marcy Berman	TV series
2008–10	Gary Unmarried	Allison Brooks	Main role
2011	Little in Common	Ellie Weller	TV film
2011	House	Julia Cuddy	"Family Practice", "Bombshells", "Moving On"
2011	Friends with Benefits	Claire Prater	"The Benefit of Being Shallow"
2011	The Exes	Katy	"Working Girl"
2012	Widow Detective	Jill	TV film
2012	CSI: Crime Scene Investigation	Ms. Kathy Veck	"Dune and Gloom"
2013	The Mentalist	Kris Makkena	"Black-Winged Redbird"
2013	The Haunted Hathaways	Elinor Kravits	"Haunted Interview"
2013	Two and a Half Men	Paula	"Numero Uno Accidente Lawyer", "On Vodka, on Soda, on Blender, on Mixer!"
2014	Murder in the First	Barbara Wilkerson	Recurring role
2014	Major Crimes	Jenn O'Hara	"Leap of Faith"
2014–15	Gortimer Gibbon's Life on Normal Street	Lora Fuller	Recurring role
2015	Switched at Birth	Nancy Shimingo	"Borrowing Your Enemy's Arrows"
2016	The Soul Man	Linda	"This Mud's for You"
2016	Game of Silence	Psychic	"Road Trip"
2016	Law & Order: Special Victims Unit	Laura Collett	"Imposter"
2019–26	Euphoria	Marsha Jacobs	10 Episodes
2019–25	9-1-1	Helena Diaz	7 episodes
2020	Modern Family	Beverly	"Legacy"
2021–22	Walker	Gale Davidson	10 episodes
2023	The Rookie: Feds	Candace Thurlow	"The Offer"
2024	Chicago Med	Leanne Archer	"This Town Ain't Big Enough for Both of Us"
