= Cynthia Lamontagne =

American actress

Cynthia LaMontagne
- Born: February 15, 1966 (age 59); California, U.S.
- Years active: 1993–2008
- Known for: That '70s Show
- Spouse: Aaron Zelman

Cynthia Ann LaMontagne (born February 15, 1966) is an American retired actress who has appeared in numerous television shows and films. She is best known for her recurring role as "Big Rhonda" in the fourth season of That '70s Show.

== Television ==
- Eyes – Nicole Talbert (2007)
- Criminal Minds – Becky the Reporter (uncredited) (2006)
- Veronica Mars – Catherine Lenova/Yelena Sukarenko (2005; episode "Ruskie Business")
- Buffy the Vampire Slayer – Lydia (2001—2002; 2 episodes)
- That '70s Show – Big Rhonda (2001–2002; 6 episodes)
- Frasier – Annie (1998-2001; 2 episodes)
- Maybe This Time – Bethany (1995)
- Dharma and Greg – Sarah Marsh (1999; episode “Looking for the Goodbars”)

== Filmography ==
- Forgetting Sarah Marshall – Female Bartender (2008)
- Would I Lie to You? – Serenity (2002)
- American Virgin (2000) – Gloria
- Border to Border – The Other Woman (1998)
- My Engagement Party – Stacy (1998)
- Austin Powers: International Man of Mystery – Fembot (1997)
- The Cable Guy – Restaurant Hostess (1996)
- Flirting with Disaster – Sandra (1996)
- Carlito's Way – Woman at Elevator (1993)
