= Corinne Bohrer =

American actress

- Born: October 18, 1958 (age 67); Camp Lejeune, North Carolina, U.S.
- Occupation: Actress
- Years active: 1981–present

Corinne Bohrer (born October 18, 1958) is an American film and television actress whose career has spanned four decades and includes regular roles in eight primetime series produced between 1984 and 2015: E/R (1984–85), I’ll Take Manhattan (1987), Free Spirit (leading role, 1989–90), Man of the People (1991–92), Double Rush (1995), Partners (1995–96), Rude Awakening (recurring, 1998–2001), Veronica Mars (recurring, 2004–2006) and Murder in the First (recurring, 2015).

== Early life ==
Born on the North Carolina Marine Corps Base Camp Lejeune, Bohrer was raised in Lancaster, Pennsylvania; Billings, Montana; and Arlington, Texas, where she attended Lamar High School. She was active in drama, band, and student government.

She attended the University of Texas at Arlington to study journalism but never graduated.

== Career ==
While in college, she modeled, performed in commercials, and worked as a dancer.

=== Film and television ===
Aged 22, Bohrer was in Hollywood, working on her first on-screen assignment — a one-minute role as a stranded motorist on McClain's Law, the pilot telefilm of the 1981 James Arness series of the same name. In 1986 she appeared in the 22nd episode of the first season of MacGyver as Terry Ross. 1987 saw her as Laura, Zeds’ love interest in Police Academy 4 Citizens on patrol. In 1988 she co-starred opposite Randy Quaid in Dead Solid Perfect, and followed that with a co-starring role opposite Judge Reinhold and Fred Savage in the comedy Vice Versa. During the 1990s, she appeared on Murder, She Wrote.

Many of her major roles were in short-lived sitcoms. She played a young pediatric nurse who had a crush on Elliott Gould in the 1984-1985 CBS sitcom E/R, a bohemian witch who becomes a nanny for a motherless family, Bohrer's first role as lead actress, in the early 90s ABC sitcom Free Spirit, and a prim and conservative administrative assistant who acted as a foil to her boss, an unscrupulous City Councilman played by James Garner in the NBC sitcom Man of the People.

She is also known as Trickster's sidekick Prank in the 1990 CBS series The Flash and the version from The CW, in which she appeared in a 2018 episode.

Bohrer's work has included a recurring role as Lianne Mars, the wayward mother of the title character in the CW television series Veronica Mars.

She was featured in the Dream On episode "What I Did for Lust" and the Friends episode "The One Where Rachel Finds Out" (1995).

=== Commercials ===
Bohrer has also frequently appeared in commercials. She appeared in McDonald's 1987 Chicken McNuggets Shanghai campaign. She also played the role of the "counselor" in Apple Inc.'s "Get a Mac" ad campaign. Other commercials include Totino's Pizza Rolls, Walgreens, Campbell's low sodium soup and Bounty ("One-sheeter"!).

=== Theatre ===
In 1983 she appeared in Larry Ketron's comedy The Trading Post at the Odyssey Theatre Ensemble in Los Angeles.

== Filmography ==
=== Film ===
Year	Title	Role	Notes
1981	McClain's Law	Vicki Thomas	Television film
1982	Zapped!	Cindy	as Corrinne Bohrer
1982	My Favorite Year	Bonnie	
1982	They Call Me Bruce?	Cowgirl Suzie	
1983	Joysticks	Patsy Rutter	
1984	Surf II	Cindy Lou	
1986	Stewardess School	Cindy Adams	
1987	Police Academy 4: Citizens on Patrol	Laura	
1987	Cross My Heart	Susan	
1988	Dead Solid Perfect	Janie Rimmer	
1988	Vice Versa	Sam	
1994	The Coriolis Effect	Suzy	Short film
1994	Revenge of the Nerds IV: Nerds in Love	Jeanie Humphrey	Television film
1995	Aurora: Operation Intercept	Sharon Pruett	
1997	Under Wraps	Marshall's Mom	Television film
1997	Star Kid	Janet Holloway	
1998	Inconceivable	Eve	
2000	Big Eden	Anna Rudolph	
2000	Phantom of the Megaplex	Julie Riley	Television film
2019	Tellers	Gloria Duffield	

=== Television ===
Year	Title	Role	Notes
1982	Falcon Crest	Ann Hilton	Episode: "Heir Apparent"
1982	Making the Grade		Episode: "Marriage, Dave Style"
1982	The Powers of Matthew Star	Cheerleader	Episode: "Daredevil"
1983	T.J. Hooker	Beth Arnold	Episode: "The Decoy"
1984	Hardcastle and McCormick	Gina Longren	Episode: "Third Down and Twenty Years to Life"
1984	The Yellow Rose	Rickey	Episode: "Sport of Kings"
1984–1985	E/R	Nurse Cory Smith	22 episodes
1986	MacGyver	Terry Ross	Episode: "The Assassin"
1986	St. Elsewhere	Suzanne McConnell	Episode: "Brand New Band"
1989–1990	Free Spirit	Winnie Goodwinn	14 episodes
1991	The Flash	Zoey Clark / Prank	Episode: "Trial of the Trickster"
1991	Dream On	Chloe	Episode: "What I Did for Lust"
1991	Herman's Head	Connie	Episode: "Pilot"
1991–1992	Man of the People	Constance Leroy	10 episodes
1992, 1994, 1996	Murder, She Wrote	Wanda Andrews, Bea Huffington, Helena McKenna	3 episodes
1994	Diagnosis: Murder	Bobbie Burton	Episode: "Reunion with Murder"
1995	Double Rush	Zoe Fuller	13 episodes
1995	Friends	Melanie	Episode: "The One Where Rachel Finds Out"
1995	Ned and Stacey	Stephanie	Episode: "Please Don't Squeeze Out"
1995–1996	Partners	Lolie	7 episodes
1998–2000	Rude Awakening	Tish Frank	12 episodes
2003–2004	Joan of Arcadia	Sylvia Tardio	2 episodes
2004–2006	Veronica Mars	Lianne Mars	7 episodes
2015	Murder in the First	Lydia Maker	5 episodes
2018	The Flash	Zoey Clark / Prank	Episode: "The Elongated Knight Rises"
2020	Criminal Minds	Alexandria Duggan	2 episodes
2021	Grey's Anatomy	Emma Correa	Episode "Here Comes the Sun"
