= Lisa Thornhill =

American actress (born 1966)

- Born: September 30, 1966 (age 59); Hardinsburg, Kentucky, U.S.
- Occupation: Actress
- Years active: 1992–present
- Known for: The Family Man; Veronica Mars; 18 Wheels of Justice

Lisa Thornhill (born September 30, 1966) is an American actress.

== Early life ==
On September 30, 1966, Thornhill was born in Hardinsburg, Kentucky. Thornhill's parents are J.C. Thornhill and Lynda Beauchamp Thornhill. Thornhill has a sister. Thornhill was raised around truckers.

== Career ==
Thornhill is best known for playing the role of Evelyn Thompson in the 2000 film The Family Man, Celeste Kane in the television series Veronica Mars, Gwen in the 2002 film Life or Something Like It, and Agent Celia "Cie" Baxter in the television series 18 Wheels of Justice.

== Filmography ==
=== Film ===
Year	Title	Role	Notes
1992	The Hollywood Beach Murders	Tanya Duncan	
1996	Power 98	Vivian Porter	
1997	Meet Wally Sparks	Priscilla Preston	
1998	A Very Unlucky Leprechaun	Sharon Connor	
1999	Enemy Action	Catherine Kelly	
2000	The Family Man	Evelyn Thompson	
2002	Life or Something Like It	Gwen	
2002	Red Dragon	Mrs. Sherman	
2003	Becoming Marty	Jenny	
2004	After the Sunset	Gail	
2007	Rush Hour 3	Nurse	
2012	Death Artists, Inc.	Moira	Short film
2014	Veronica Mars	Celeste Kane	
2018	The Perfect One	Bianca	
2020	Killer Daddy Issues	Maria	
2022	Exploited	Nana Marie	
2023	The Engagement Dress	Cathy	
2024	Ladybug	Mikayla	

=== Television ===
Year	Title	Role	Notes
1995	Her Hidden Truth	Jean Calhoun	TV film
1996	The Client	Lauren	Episode: "The Morning After"
1996	Savannah	Det. Sheila Madsen	Episodes: "The Family Jewels", "A Picture Is Worth..."
1997	The Drew Carey Show	Beth	Episode: "Drewstock"
1997	Wings	Mrs. Burton	Episode: "Ms. Write"
1997	Chicago Hope	Joan Hart	Episode: "Colonel of Truth"
1997	The Shining	Rita Hayworth Lookalike	TV miniseries
1997	Timecop	Rita Lake	Episode: "Stalker"
1997	Fired Up	Kelly Jenkins	Episode: "In Your Dreams"
1998	The Closer	Vivica / Dana	Episodes: "Morality Bites", "My Best Friend's Funeral"
1998–2000	The Brian Benben Show	Tabitha Berkeley	Recurring role (6 episodes)
1999	Vengeance Unlimited	Theresa Greco	Episode: "Vendetta"
1999	Jesse	Dana	Episode: "The Best Possible Deal"
1999	Ally McBeal	Kimberly Goodman	Episode; "Love Unlimited"
1999	For Your Love	Claudia	Episode: "The Ex-Files"
1999	Beverly Hills, 90210	Karen Lewis	Episode; "The Loo-Ouch"
2000	Secret Agent Man	Tala	Episode: "The Face"
2000	Diagnosis: Murder	Stacy Bradshaw	Episode: "The Cradle Will Rock"
2000–2001	18 Wheels of Justice	Agent Celia 'Cie' Baxter	Main role (45 episodes)
2001	Star Trek: Enterprise	Female Alien	Episode: "Unexpected"
2001	Friends	Kristen	Episode: "The One with the Videotape"
2002	Crossing Jordan	Melissa Tate	Episode; "Prisoner Exchange"
2003	She Spies	Peggy	Episode: "While You Were Out"
2003	Charmed	Meta	Episode: "Oh My Goddess!: Part 1"
2003	Monk	Noelle Winters	Episode: "Mr. Monk Meets the Playboy"
2003–2004	Frasier	Caroline Harwich	Episodes: "Sea Bee Jeebies","The Ann Who Came to Dinner"
2004	The Division	Jane Lance	Episode: "What's Love Got to Do with It?"
2004–2006	Veronica Mars	Celeste Kane	Recurring role (11 episodes)
2005	The Inside	Lydia Osterland	Episode: "Aidan"
2005	CSI: Crime Scene Investigation	Chloe Daniels	Episode: "Nesting Dolls"
2005	CSI: Miami	Felicia Hardy	Episode: "Three-Way"
2006	Murder 101	Dr. Louise Raymond	TV film
2006	The War at Home	Rebecca	Episode: "The Seventeen-Year Itch"
2006	Bones	Kristen Mitchell	Episode: "The Girl with the Curl"
2007	Shark	Stephanie Downing	Episode: "No Holds Barred"
2008	Weeds		Episode: "The Three Coolers"
2011	Harry's Law	Specialist	Episode: "American Girl"
2011	Southland	Katherine Wellington	Episode: "The Winds"
2014	Play It Again, Dick	Celeste Kane	Episodes: "1.1", "1.8"
2015	Switched at Birth	Sadie's Mother	Episode: "How Does a Girl Like You Get to Be a Girl Like You"
2016	Major Crimes	Jennifer Edwards	Episode: "White Lies Part 1"
2023	The Love Hunt	June	TV film
2023	The Boxer and the Butterfly	Jo	TV film

== See also ==
- List of Veronica Mars episodes
