= Percy Daggs III =

American actor

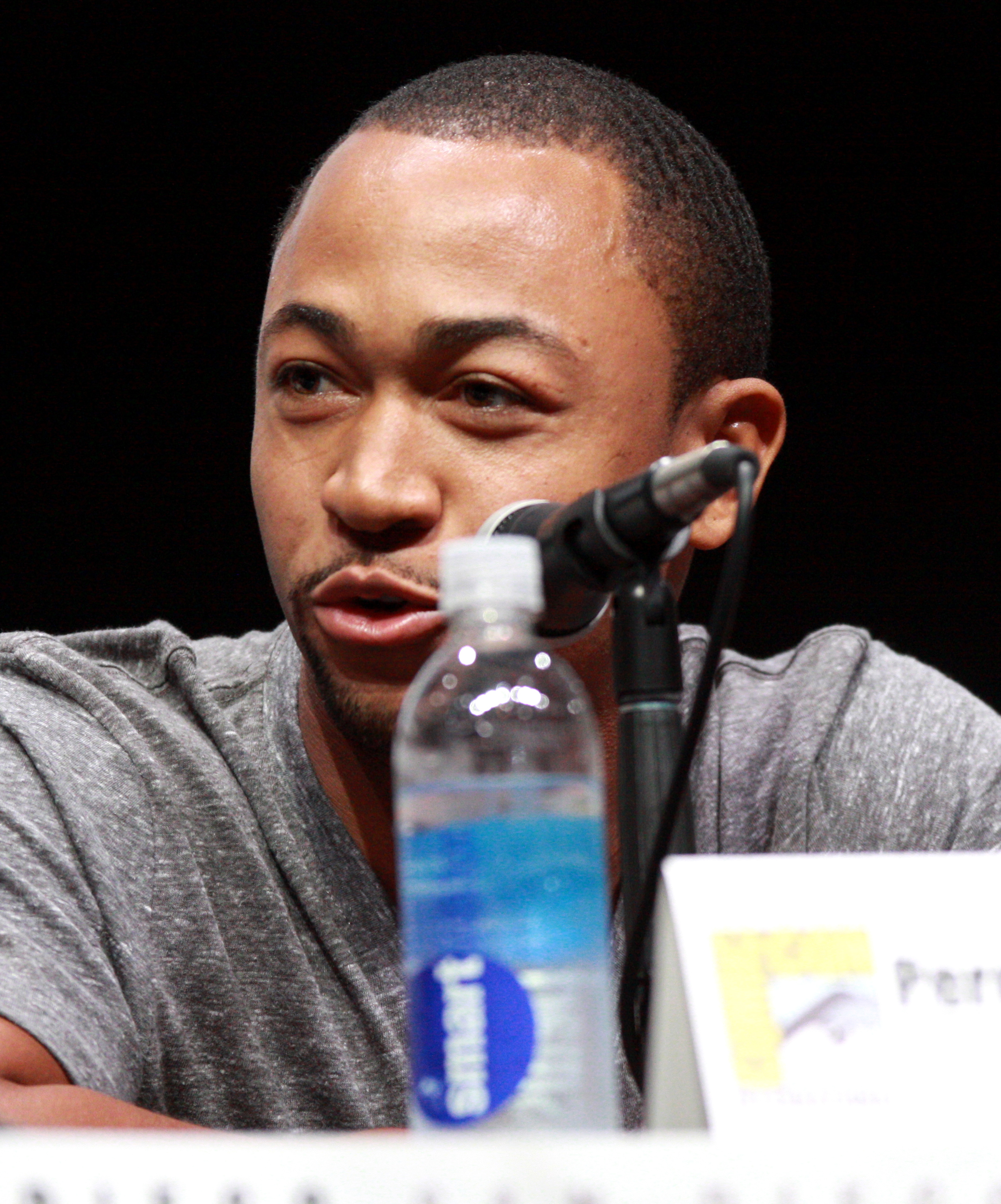
- Daggs in 2013
- Born: July 20, 1982 (age 44); Long Beach, California, U.S.
- Occupation: Actor
- Years active: 1998–present

Percy Daggs III (born July 20, 1982) is an American actor best known for his role as Wallace Fennel in the Rob Thomas television series Veronica Mars. He is also known for starring in television commercials for Hot Pockets and Orbit Gum. He has had guest appearances on such shows as Boston Public, The Guardian, NYPD Blue and The Nightmare Room.

His younger sister was featured on MTV's Made as an aspiring surfer. He has a son named Percy Daggs IV.

== Filmography ==
=== Film ===
Year	Title	Role	Notes
2001	Blue Hill Avenue	Young Money	
2008	American Son	Shawn	
2011	Detention	Jock Kid	
2012	In the Hive	Rack Robinson	
2013	Murder101	Carlyle	
2014	Veronica Mars	Wallace Fennel	
2019	Christmas in Louisiana	Luke Abshire	
2023	Infraction	Terrance Lewis	Short film

=== Television ===
Year	Title	Role	Notes
1998	Any Day Now		Episode: "Making Music with the Wrong Man"
1998	To Have & to Hold	Jimmy	Episode: "Hope You Had the Time of Your Wife"
2000	Freaks and Geeks	Mathlete #2	Episode: "Looks and Books"
2001	The Amanda Show		Episode: "Penelope in Makeup"
2002	The Nightmare Room	History Teacher (voice)	Episode: "Dear Diary, I'm Dead"
2002	Family Law	Kordell	Episode: "Celano v. Foster"
2002	NYPD Blue	Kelvin Hodges	Episode: "Dead Meat in New Deli"
2002	Boston Public	Rob	Episode: "Chapter Forty-Seven"
2003	Boston Public	Rob	Episode: "Chapter Sixty-One"
2003	The Guardian	Antoine Sanders	Episode: "Ambition"
2004–2007, 2019	Veronica Mars	Wallace Fennel	Main role (51 episodes)
2008	In Plain Sight	Lawrence	Episode: "Iris Doesn't Live Here Anymore"
2008	Raising the Bar	Terrence Fletcher	Episode: "Guatemala Gulfstream"
2011	Southland	Wendell Watkins	Episode: "Code 4"
2013	Safaricize	Chief Tom Tom (voice)	TV movie, filming
2015	iZombie	Sean Taylor	Episode: "Patriot Brains"
2019	Undone	Cassie's Dad	Episode: "Handheld Blackjack"
2019	Christmas in Louisiana	Luke	Lifetime TV Movie

=== Web series ===
Year	Title	Role
2015	The New Adventures of Peter and Wendy	Jas Hook
