= Veronica Mars (character) =

Fictional character

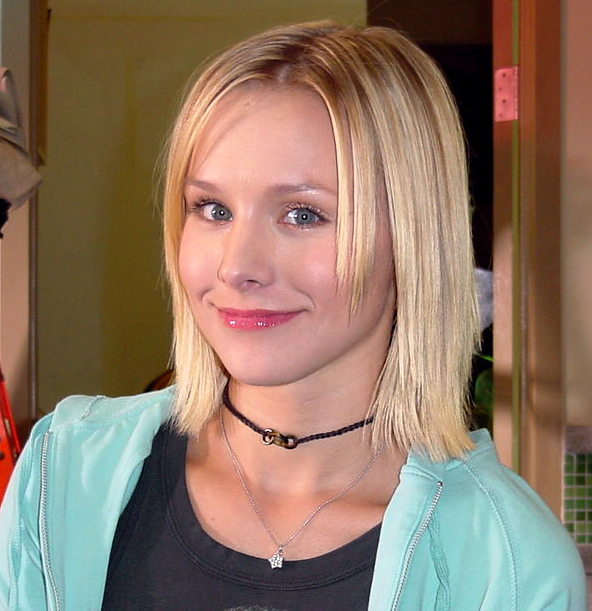
- Kristen Bell as Veronica Mars
- First appearance: "Pilot" (2004)
- Last appearance: "Years, Continents, Bloodshed" (2019)
- Created by: Rob Thomas
- Portrayed by: Kristen Bell

In-universe information
- Gender: Female
- Occupation: Student; Barista at Java the Hut; Journalist for the Hearst Free Press; Private detective; FBI intern; Help desk attendant at Hearst Library
- Family: Keith Mars (father); Lianne Mars (mother); Tanner Scott (step-father); Aurora Scott (step-sister); Hunter Scott (half-brother)
- Significant others: Logan Echolls (husband, deceased); Stosh "Piz" Piznarski (ex-boyfriend); Duncan Kane (ex-boyfriend); Leo D'Amato (ex-boyfriend); Troy Vandegraff (ex-boyfriend)

Veronica Mars is the fictional protagonist, occasional narrator (through voice-overs), and antiheroine of the American television series Veronica Mars, which aired on UPN from 2004 to 2006 and on The CW from 2006 to 2007. The character, portrayed by Kristen Bell, remained the central figure throughout the show's run. After the series was canceled, Bell reprised her role in the 2014 film continuation and the 2019 revival on Hulu. The character was created by Rob Thomas and was originally conceived as a male protagonist for his unproduced novel Untitled Rob Thomas Teen Detective Novel. However, when the concept transitioned into a television series, Thomas changed the character's gender, believing that a noir narrative from a female perspective would be more compelling.

Before the events of the show, Veronica's best friend, Lilly Kane, is murdered, and her father, Keith Mars, loses his job as sheriff of the fictional town of Neptune, California after accusing Lilly's father of involvement in the murder. This accusation also damages his reputation and results in his wife leaving him. The series opens with Veronica at the bottom of her high school's social hierarchy, having been ostracized by her peers after losing her popular status and friends due to her father's actions.

== Character history ==
=== Background and plot ===
At the beginning of the series, Veronica Mars is a 17-year-old junior at Neptune High in the fictional town of Neptune, California, located near San Diego. According to series creator Rob Thomas, Veronica's birthday is in August. After school, Veronica works for her father, Keith Mars, a private investigator and the former sheriff of Balboa County, California. Initially, Veronica has few friends due to her social downfall after her father’s controversial actions, but her situation changes when she meets Wallace Fennel, whom she helps out of a difficult situation. Wallace quickly becomes Veronica's best friend and closest ally throughout the series.

=== Back-story to season one ===
Veronica's story is narrated through voice-overs and flashbacks, woven into the main plot of the series. A year before the events of the show, Veronica was part of the popular "in-crowd" at Neptune High, which was dominated by the wealthy and influential "09er" clique, named after Neptune's elite 90909 zip code. Veronica's best friend was Lilly Kane, and she was dating Lilly's brother, Duncan Kane. Meanwhile, Lilly was in a relationship with Logan Echolls, Duncan's good friend. Though Veronica didn't come from the same wealth as other 09ers, she was accepted into the group because of her relationship with Duncan and her father Keith Mars' position as sheriff.

However, Veronica's life took a sharp turn when Duncan suddenly broke up with her without explanation, and Lilly refused to tell her what had gone wrong. Shortly afterward, Lilly was found murdered near her family's pool. In the aftermath, Sheriff Keith Mars accused Lilly's father, Jake Kane, a beloved and powerful software entrepreneur, of involvement in the murder. The accusation shocked the citizens of Neptune, and Keith was swiftly voted out of office and shunned by the wealthy 09er community.

Keith's situation worsened when his successor, Sheriff Don Lamb, arrested Abel Koontz, a former disgruntled employee of Kane Software, who confessed to Lilly's murder. This further tarnished Keith's reputation, leading the community to view him as a pariah.

The shock and loss of income following Keith Mars' fall from grace devastated the Mars family. Veronica's mother, Lianne Mars, turned to alcohol and eventually abandoned the family a few months later. Despite the social pressure, Veronica refused to denounce her father, solidifying her status as an outsider. Duncan Kane and the rest of the 09ers cut ties with her, leaving Veronica isolated and banished from Neptune High's elite social circle.

Two months after Lilly's death, in an act of defiance, Veronica attended an 09er party hosted by Shelley Pomroy to show her former friends that she no longer cared about their opinions. At the party, Veronica’s drink was spiked with GHB, a date-rape drug, and she woke up the next morning in a guest bedroom, disoriented and without any memory of the night. To her horror, she realized she had been raped. When she reported the assault to Sheriff Don Lamb, he dismissed her claims, calling her a liar and humiliating her by throwing her out of his office.

These traumatic events left a deep mark on Veronica, fueling her cynicism and disgust toward her classmates and Neptune’s wealthy elite. Like her father, she became a social outcast. Veronica began channeling her anger and energy into working at her father’s detective agency, assisting with investigations. A turning point came when she met new transfer student Wallace Fennel, who became her best friend. With his friendship and support, Veronica started using her investigative skills to help fellow students and, in doing so, found herself frequently confronting the 09ers.

Over time, with the help of Wallace, as well as her newfound friends Wallace Fennel, Cindy "Mac" Mackenzie, and Meg Manning, Veronica slowly began to outgrow her bitterness and cynicism, allowing her to rebuild her sense of purpose and move forward.

=== Detective ===
After being ousted from the Sheriff's Department, Keith Mars opens Mars Investigations, a private investigation agency. Veronica takes on an after-school job as his secretary, but despite her father's wishes, she often oversteps her role, tackling cases on her own. In fact, she frequently solves cases before her father, including some that she is explicitly told not to get involved with. At Neptune High, Veronica also becomes an unofficial private investigator, using her skills to track down computer hackers, uncover secrets about parents, find stolen items like the school’s mascot, and much more. She stays one step ahead of both her father and Vice-Principal Van Clemmons, often with the help of her best friend Wallace Fennel, who becomes the Watson to her Holmes and Eli "Weevil" Navarro, the leader of the PCH Biker Gang.

One of the key relationships in Veronica’s life is with Logan Echolls (played by Jason Dohring). Once her close friend, Logan had been instrumental in organizing her blacklisting from the 09er clique. Their relationship remains strained, and they often clash until Logan seeks Veronica’s help to investigate whether his mother, Lynn Echolls, had faked her death after jumping into the ocean. Still dealing with the abandonment of her own mother, Veronica empathizes with Logan’s situation, and they reconcile most of their differences.

By the end of the third season, Veronica successfully completes her California state examination and earns her official license as a private investigator, scoring an impressive 95 on her test.

Years later, Veronica is shown to have moved on from her life as a private investigator and is on the verge of accepting a prestigious job offer from a law firm in New York. However, when Logan is accused of murder, Veronica returns to Neptune to clear his name. This case reignites her passion for justice, leading her to stay in Neptune, where she decides to continue fighting against the local corruption and classism that have worsened since her departure.

== Romantic relationships ==
=== Duncan Kane ===
Veronica dated Duncan Kane until approximately September 2003, though both her mother, Lianne Mars, and Duncan’s mother, Celeste Kane, were against their relationship. Veronica didn’t understand why until much later. Prior to Lilly Kane's death, Celeste revealed to Duncan that his father, Jake Kane, had an affair with Lianne, raising the possibility that Veronica might be Duncan’s half-sister. This revelation prompted Duncan to break up with Veronica without explanation. However, after Keith Mars conducted a paternity test, it was confirmed that he, not Jake, was Veronica’s father.

Veronica and Duncan did not speak until well into her junior year. A few episodes into the series, they begin to rebuild their relationship, becoming friends again. This is briefly halted when Veronica believes Duncan raped her during a party where both were under the influence of GHB. However, the misunderstanding is cleared up once the circumstances of that night come to light.

During the summer between the first and second seasons, Veronica and Duncan rekindle their romance on her 18th birthday, staying together until about midway through season two. Unbeknownst to Duncan, his former girlfriend, Meg Manning, was pregnant when they broke up. Meg was on the school bus that crashed at the beginning of season two and, although she survived initially, she was left in a coma. She later died from a blood clot after briefly regaining consciousness. Their daughter was born just before Meg's death.

To prevent Meg's abusive parents from gaining custody of his daughter, Duncan decides to kidnap the baby and flee. Veronica helps him with the plan, and the two share an emotional farewell, knowing they can never see each other again. Duncan does not return to the series, except for a brief cameo at the end of season two, where he is shown living in Australia with his daughter. In this scene, Duncan is seen on a beach when his phone rings. He answers with "CW?" (a meta-joke about the show moving to the new CW network), and Clarence Weidman informs him, "It’s a done deal," implying Duncan orchestrated the killing of Aaron Echolls in revenge for Aaron being acquitted of Lilly’s murder.

=== Troy Vandegraff ===
Troy Vandegraff was a childhood friend of Duncan Kane who briefly attended Neptune High during the early episodes of the first season. Despite the negative rumors circulating about Veronica, Troy took an interest in her. Initially hesitant, Veronica eventually warmed to him after seeing his seemingly genuine intentions. However, in the fifth episode, Troy deceives Veronica, manipulating her into helping him escape being sent to boarding school so he can run away with his old girlfriend. Veronica uncovers his plan and, in a twist, double-crosses him, thwarting his escape.

Veronica doesn’t encounter Troy again until the second season episode titled "The Rapes of Graff", when both of them visit Hearst College. Initially cold towards him, Veronica listens as Troy insists he has changed and apologizes for how he treated her. He also admits that his feelings for her were real when they dated. When Troy becomes a suspect in the rape and head-shaving of a student after a party, Veronica steps in to help prove his innocence. After the situation is resolved, the two part on amicable terms.

=== Leo D'Amato ===
Leo D'Amato (played by Max Greenfield) is a deputy at the Neptune Sheriff’s Department, who briefly dated Veronica during the middle of the first season. Initially, Veronica sought Leo's help to gain access to classified evidence or police files for her investigations, but over time, she developed romantic feelings for him. Their relationship ended when Veronica kissed Logan Echolls, leading her to break up with Leo as she didn’t want to continue dating him while sorting out her feelings for Logan.

Years later, in the fourth season, Leo reappears as an FBI agent working on the same case as Veronica. While their friendship is rekindled and there is still evident chemistry between them, the flirtation ultimately helps Veronica solidify her decision to be with Logan.

=== Logan Echolls ===
Veronica began dating Logan Echolls at the end of the first season. While she was still dating Leo D’Amato, she kissed Logan as a thank-you for saving her from a would-be kidnapper (played by Jonathan Taylor Thomas), who was later revealed to be an ATF agent. The kiss quickly turned into something more as Logan pulled her into a passionate embrace, leading them to begin secretly dating.

Their relationship soon hit a rough patch when it was revealed that Logan had supplied the GHB that was used to drug Veronica at Shelly Pomroy's party, the night she was raped. For a time, Veronica even suspected that Logan was her rapist. However, after discovering that he wasn’t responsible, she reconciled with him. Their relationship became public at a party attended by Logan's fellow 09ers. During the same party, Veronica discovered hidden cameras in the bed of Logan's pool house, leading her to flee in distress. Around this time, Veronica also learned that Logan had no alibi on the day Lilly Kane was murdered, which made her fear that Logan might have been involved in Lilly's death.

Veronica later discovered that the cameras in the pool house had been installed by Logan's father, Aaron Echolls, who had been secretly having an affair with Lilly. Aaron murdered Lilly after she stole tapes of their encounters. The night Aaron was arrested for Lilly's murder, Logan showed up at Veronica's house, having been brutally beaten by the PCHers. Despite the accusations against him, Veronica stood by Logan when he was accused of murdering Felix Toombs, one of the PCH bikers. Although Logan was acquitted, his behavior became increasingly erratic during the summer, fueled by the emotional toll of his trial and the shocking revelations about his father’s affair with Lilly and her murder.

After Logan and the 09ers started a violent turf war with the PCHers, Veronica broke up with him, telling him that he had become out of control and seemed to enjoy the violence too much.

Later in the season, Logan drunkenly confessed to Veronica that he still had deep feelings for her, calling their love "epic." The next morning, Veronica visited Logan to tell him she felt the same, but he had no memory of what he’d said and had spent the night with his ex, Kendall Casablancas. Despite this, during her confrontation with Cassidy Casablancas on the roof of the Neptune Grand, it was Logan whom Veronica called for help. Logan arrived in time to tackle Cassidy, stopping him from shooting Veronica. He then talked her out of shooting Cassidy herself and comforted her when she feared her father had died in the explosion of Woody Goodman's plane.

Following this intense encounter, Veronica and Logan resumed their relationship and grew closer over the summer. As the third season begins, they both attend Hearst College, and their relationship remains as passionate as before. However, Veronica's trust issues—developed over the past few years—start to take a toll. She struggles with the impulse to monitor and verify everything Logan says or does, while Logan grows frustrated with the pressure she places on him and her inability to admit she could be wrong.

Their relationship faces a breaking point when Logan reveals that he and Mercer had left a motel in Tijuana in flames without helping anyone escape. Veronica is furious and distances herself from him. However, when Logan comes to her rescue after she is drugged and attacked by the Hearst rapist, Veronica realizes that her feelings for him are still strong.

Unable to handle the constant danger Veronica faces, Logan tries to persuade her to stop investigating the rapes at Hearst College. He even goes as far as hiring a bodyguard to follow her without her knowledge, which infuriates Veronica when she finds out. Though they work through their issues and both admit their love for each other, Logan breaks up with Veronica in the ninth episode of season three. He explains that despite their feelings, they both know their relationship isn’t working—Veronica's trust issues and Logan’s need to protect her, despite her wishes, have created an unresolvable tension. He tells her that he would rather deal with a little pain now than face a much bigger heartbreak later. Logan assures her he will always be there for her. Veronica is devastated by the breakup and breaks down when she gets home.

Though Logan continues to help Veronica in her search for the rapist, he is elsewhere when Mercer and Moe attack her. When Logan learns that Mercer was behind the assault, he deliberately gets himself arrested to land in the same cell as Mercer—seeking revenge.

The couple spends the next six weeks apart. During the breakup, Dick Casablancas tries to help Logan move on by taking him to the beach, where they meet up with a group of girls. Later, Veronica shows up at Logan's place, and the two share a passionate kiss, realizing how much they missed each other, leading them to get back together.

However, in the following episode, Logan confesses that he had hooked up with someone during their six-week break, though he insists it meant "less than nothing" to him. It is later revealed that Logan slept with Madison Sinclair in Aspen, which Veronica sees as one of the worst possible betrayals due to their complicated history. This time, jealousy and Veronica's inability to forgive end their relationship once more.

Logan eventually moves on with Parker Lee, while Veronica starts dating Stosh "Piz" Piznarski. Veronica vows never to speak to Logan again after he violently attacks Piz, mistakenly believing that Piz had shared a racy video of him and Veronica across campus. The series ends with Logan and Veronica sharing a final, ambiguous look, leaving their relationship unresolved.

After not seeing each other for nine years, Logan and Veronica reconnect in the Veronica Mars film, where Veronica returns to help Logan when he is accused of murder. They rekindle their relationship, and Logan vows to return to Veronica after his deployment with the Navy. This relationship continues into the fourth season, which includes a subplot involving Logan’s proposal to Veronica. Though she initially rejects it, she later accepts, and the two get married.

In a tragic turn, the series ends with Logan’s death. The Neptune Bomber's final attack occurs when a bomb left in their car detonates just as Logan and Veronica are about to leave for their honeymoon.

=== Stosh "Piz" Piznarski ===
Veronica first met Piz Piznarski on her first day at Hearst College, introduced through her best friend Wallace Fennel, who was Piz's roommate. In the episode "Welcome Wagon", Wallace asks Veronica to help Piz find his stolen belongings. Upon their first meeting, Piz is immediately captivated by Veronica, developing a crush on her. However, at the time, Veronica is still dating Logan Echolls, and while Piz’s feelings for her are clear, she doesn’t reciprocate them, though they develop a steady friendship.

Throughout their friendship, Veronica confides in Piz about her relationship troubles with Logan. Although Piz is quietly disappointed, he offers her advice that leads to her reconciliation with Logan. Despite this, Piz and Veronica remain close, and later, when her relationship with Logan ends, their friendship gradually evolves into a romantic relationship.

Piz and Veronica seem to be happy together, especially when they support each other through a crisis involving a racy video of them that gets emailed around Hearst College. When Logan—jumping to conclusions—attacks Piz, believing he made the video, Veronica vows never to speak to Logan again. This incident also leads to Logan's breakup with Parker Lee, as Parker realizes Logan still has feelings for Veronica.

Later, after Veronica and Piz discover the real culprit behind the video, Piz advises Veronica to drop the matter when she angrily confronts the person responsible. Although Veronica is reluctant, she listens to Piz and walks away. However, when Logan learns that the student responsible for the video has mob connections, he confronts him and beats him up, showing his continued emotional investment in Veronica. Logan apologizes to Piz for attacking him, as Veronica had suggested, and leaves without looking back. This moment leaves Piz with the realization that, despite his relationship with Veronica, he may never have the deep, unshakable connection with her that Logan does. Veronica's lingering gaze on Logan further cements this feeling of doubt in Piz.

In the Veronica Mars film, it is revealed that Piz and Veronica broke up after she transferred to Stanford following her freshman year. They reconnect when Veronica moves to New York for law school, and at the start of the film, they are dating again. However, Piz breaks up with her when her reluctance to leave Neptune—and Logan—makes him question her true feelings for him.

== Reception ==
AOL included Veronica Mars in its list of TV's Smartest Detectives. The same website ranked her as the 8th Most Memorable Female TV Character. She was also featured on UGO.com's list of 50 Top TV Characters, where she was ranked at No. 17. Additionally, AfterEllen.com placed her at No. 14 in their Top 50 Favorite Female TV Characters.

Media journalists frequently noted that Bell's portrayal of Veronica Mars was critically underrated, with many arguing that her performance deserved both an Emmy nomination and win.
