= The Best Little Secrets Are Kept =

Studio album by Louis XIV
- Released: March 21, 2005
- Recorded: 2004
- Genres: Alternative rock, garage rock, glam rock
- Length: 37:56
- Label: Atlantic
- Producer: Jason Hill

Louis XIV chronology
Illegal Tender (2005)	The Best Little Secrets Are Kept (2005)	Live at the Virgin Megastore, Sunset Strip (2005)

Singles from The Best Little Secrets Are Kept
- 1. "Finding Out That True Love Is Blind" Released: 2005; 2. "God Killed the Queen" Released: 2005

The Best Little Secrets Are Kept is the second album by Louis XIV. It was released internationally on March 21, 2005 and a day later on March 22 in the United States. The album is named after a line from the band's song "Pledge of Allegiance".

== Critical reception ==
Professional ratings
Aggregate scores
Source	Rating
Metacritic	62/100
Review scores
Source	Rating
Allmusic	4/5 stars
E!	B+
PopMatters	(5/10)
Pitchfork	(1.2/10)

The Best Little Secrets Are Kept was met with "generally favorable" reviews from critics. At Metacritic, which assigns a weighted average rating out of 100 to reviews from mainstream publications, this release received an average score of 62, based on 18 reviews.

== Track listing ==
1. "Louis XIV" (Hill/Karscig) – 3:05
2. "Finding Out True Love Is Blind" (Hill/Karscig) – 4:14
3. "Paper Doll" (Hill) – 3:25
4. "God Killed the Queen" (Hill/Karscig) – 2:48
5. "A Letter to Dominique" (Hill/Karscig) – 3:04
6. "Illegal Tender" (Hill/Karscig/Maigaard) – 3:13
7. "Pledge of Allegiance" (Hill) – 3:37
8. "Hey Teacher" (Hill/Karscig) – 3:42
9. "All the Little Pieces" (Hill/Karscig) – 4:51
10. "Ball of Twine" (Hill) – 5:57
11. "Every Which Way That I Can" (Japan only bonus track)
12. "Love Stricken Felony" (Japan only bonus track)

=== Music video ===
Louis XIV worked with alt porn director Eon McKai and the SuicideGirls website to produce a music video for "Paper Doll". The video, featuring models Claudia, Cricket, and Xtine trying on different outfits in a dressing room, was released exclusively on the SuicideGirls website.

== Personnel ==
Louis XIV

- Brian Karscig – vocals, guitar, piano, vocals, string arrangements; bass (tracks 6, 8)
- Jason Hill – lead guitar, vocals, piano, producer, engineer, string arrangements, mixing; bass (tracks 1, 4, 5, 7, 9)
- James Edwards Armbrust – bass (tracks 2, 3, 10)
- Mark Anders Maigaard – drums

Additional Musicians

- Lindsey Troy – vocals
- Frank Palumbo – trumpet
- Robert Arthur Dodds – guitar
- Clayton Bullock – violin
- Louis Caverly – violin
- Michelle Negele – viola
- Andrew Shulman – cello

Technical

- Alex Albrecht – assistant engineer
- Sam Buffa – collage
- Smith Darby – photography
- John Hofstetter – artwork
- Matt Hyde – mixing
- Phil Mucci – photography
- John Rubeli – A&R
- Dave Schultz – mastering

== Singles ==
Chart performance for ALBUM NAME
Single	Chart (2022)	Peak position
Finding Out True Love Is Blind	UK Singles (Official Charts)	57
God Killed The Queen	UK Singles (Official Charts)	68
