= Slick Dogs and Ponies =

Studio album by Louis XIV
- Released: January 29, 2008
- Recorded: 2007
- Genres: Indie rock, garage rock
- Length: 42:37
- Label: Atlantic
- Producer: Jason Hill

Louis XIV chronology
The Distances from Everyone to You (2007)	Slick Dogs and Ponies (2008)

Singles from Slick Dogs and Ponies
- 1. "Guilt by Association" Released: October 16, 2007; 2. "Air Traffic Control" Released: January 1, 2008

Slick Dogs and Ponies is the third studio album from American garage rock band Louis XIV, releasing on January 29, 2008, to largely negative reviews.

The album was leaked on torrent networks on January 18, 2008, after the band temporarily added all of the songs to their MySpace page.

== Reception ==
Professional ratings
Aggregate scores
Source	Rating
Metacritic	37/100
Review scores
Source	Rating
AllMusic	2.5/5 stars
Pitchfork	2.5/10
PopMatters	3/10
Rolling Stone	2/5 stars
Slant Magazine	1/5 stars
Spin	3/5 stars
Under the Radar	6/10

Initial critical response to Slick Dogs and Ponies was negative. At Metacritic, which assigns a normalized rating out of 100 to reviews from mainstream critics, the album has received an average score of 37, based on 10 reviews.

== Track listing ==
All tracks written by Jason Hill and Brian Karscig. All tracks produced by Hill, except for "Guilt by Association", which was produced by Hill, Karscig, Mark Maigaard, and Natasha Schneider.

No.	Title	Length
1.	"Guilt by Association"	2:50
2.	"Air Traffic Control"	3:53
3.	"Misguided Sheep"	4:29
4.	"There's a Traitor in This Room"	3:38
5.	"Sometimes You Just Want To"	2:33
6.	"Tina"	3:32
7.	"Stalker"	3:48
8.	"Free Won't Be What It Used to Be"	3:30
9.	"Swarming of the Bees"	2:30
10.	"Hopesick"	5:30
11.	"Slick Dogs and Ponies"	6:37
Total length:		42:55

iTunes deluxe bonus tracks
No.	Title	Length
12.	"Air Traffic Control" (Oxygen Remix)
13.	"Eleanor Rigby"
14.	"Thief in the Choir" (featuring Brandon Flowers)

Hot Topic Exclusive bonus tracks
No.	Title	Length
12.	"Money Bunnies"
13.	"Actors and Singers"

Rhapsody bonus track
No.	Title	Length
12.	"Dirty Knees"

Independent Retail bonus tracks
No.	Title	Length
12.	"Save a Prayer"
13.	"Ride a White Swan"
