= Louis XIV (album) =

Studio album by Louis XIV
- Released: November 14, 2003
- Genre: Indie rock

Louis XIV chronology
| Louis XIV (2003) | Illegal Tender (2005) |

Louis XIV is the debut studio album by American rock band Louis XIV. Released in November 2003, it was recorded and released independently through the band's record label, Pineapple Recording Group. Selling only a thousand copies, the album was discontinued after the band's signing to major label Atlantic Records in 2004.

== Track listing ==
All tracks written by Jason Hill and Brian Karscig and produced by Jason Hill.

| No. | Title | Length |
|---|---|---|
| 1. | "New Murder at the Old Chateau" | 0:50 |
| 2. | "Louis XIV" | 2:41 |
| 3. | "The Grand Apartment" | 4:28 |
| 4. | "The Hunt" | 3:00 |
| 5. | "The Hall of Mirrors" | 2:08 |
| 6. | "It's the Girl That Makes Him Happy" | 3:03 |
| 7. | "It's the Girl That Makes Him Sad" | 1:45 |
| 8. | "The Accident" | 3:35 |
| 9. | "The Ghost of the Chapel Royal" | 3:50 |
| 10. | "God Killed the Queen" | 3:13 |
| 11. | "Louis (reprise)" | 2:45 |

== Personnel ==
- Jason Hill – bass, guitar, piano, vocals, producer, engineer, string arrangements, mixing
- Brian Karscig – bass, guitar, piano, vocals, string arrangements, group member
- Alex Albrecht – assistant engineer
- James Edwards Armbrust – bass, group member
- Sam Buffa – collage
- Clayton Bulock – violin
- Louis Caverly – violin
- Smith Darby – photography
- Robert Arthur Dodds – guitar
- John Hofstetter – artwork
- Matt Hyde – mixing
- Mark Anders Maigaard – drums, group member
- Phil Mucci – photography
- Michelle Negele – viola
- Frank Palumbo – trumpet
- John Rubeli – A&R
- Dave Schultz – mastering
- Andrew Shulman – cello
- Lindsey Troy – vocals
