= The Distances from Everyone to You =

EP by Louis XIV
- Released: September 11, 2007
- Genre: Rock
- Length: 16:10
- Label: Atlantic
- Producer: Jason Hill

Louis XIV chronology
The Best Little Secrets Are Kept (2005)	The Distances from Everyone to You (2007)	Slick Dogs and Ponies (2008)

The Distances from Everyone to You is Louis XIV's second EP, released on September 11, 2007.

== Track listing ==
1. "There's a Traitor in This Room" – 3:37
2. "Your Shoes Are the Star of the Show" – 3:06
3. "The Distances from Everyone to You" – 5:08
4. "Flash's Theme" (Bonus track) – 4:19
