= Anya Marina =

American musician (born 1976)

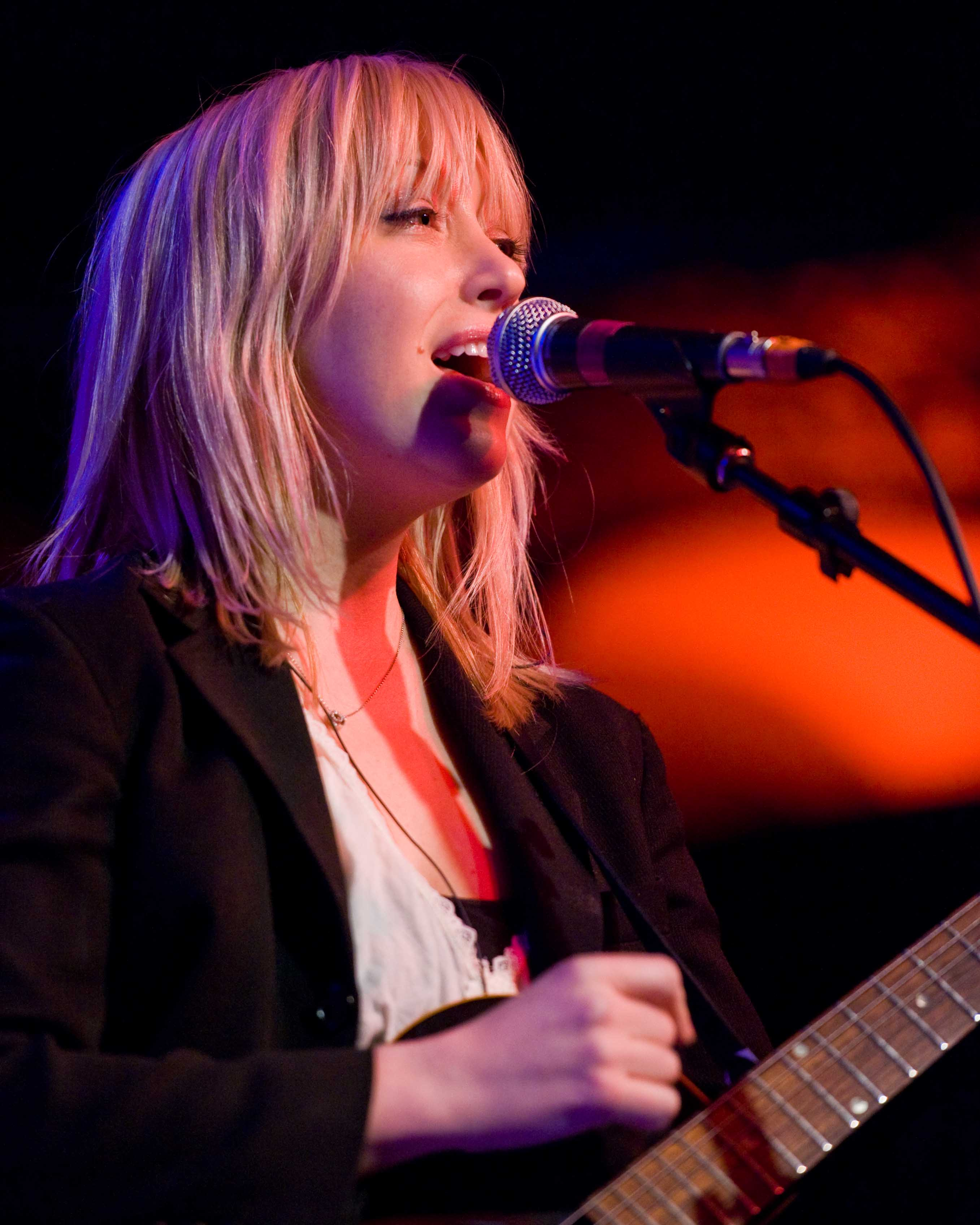
- Anya Marina performs at the Showbox Market on March 4, 2011, in Seattle, Washington

Background information
- Born: Anya Marina Kroth; September 23, 1976 (age 49)
- Origin: Ann Arbor, Michigan, U.S.
- Genres: Indie rock, indie pop, alternative rock
- Occupations: Musician, songwriter
- Instruments: Vocals, guitar
- Years active: 2004–present
- Label: Chop Shop
- Spouse: Matt Pond (m. 2023)
- Website: Anya Marina.com

Anya Marina Kroth (born September 23, 1976) is an American singer-songwriter, based in New York City. Her music has been featured on several television shows, including Grey's Anatomy, How I Met Your Mother, The Real World, Castle, United States of Tara, Gossip Girl, Batwoman, The Vampire Diaries, and Supernatural. Her songs have been featured on the soundtrack of The Twilight Saga: New Moon soundtrack and 13 Reasons Why Season 2 soundtrack. Marina also authored the theme song for the Nikki Glaser Podcast and frequently collaborates with her indie-rocker husband's band, Matt Pond PA.

== Early life and education ==
Marina was born Anya Marina Kroth in Ann Arbor, Michigan, and was raised in Cupertino, California, as the elder of two sisters. Her parents are both university professors, who teach psychology and Russian literature. She moved to Los Angeles as an aspiring actress and attended classes at the British American Drama Academy and the American Academy of Dramatic Arts. She has acted on television and in films (100 Girls). She returned to Cupertino to earn her Bachelor of Arts degree in writing and linguistics from Santa Clara University, where she appeared in music video for Faith No More and episodes of The Mr. T Experience, Unsolved Mysteries and others. In college, she worked as a DJ on KSCU and was the lead singer of the Bay Area band Andalusia.

== Career ==
After graduating in 1997, Anya appeared on The Howard Stern Show as "Anya the Au Pair", a woman wanting to be the au pair for Stern's children. After that appearance, she was hired by Mike Halloran at radio station XHRM-FM in San Diego, California, then at Y107 in Los Angeles, Premium Radio in North San Diego County, California, and finally at KBZT FM 94/9 for six years.

In San Diego Marina played her first open mic night and began to write her own songs. She developed a live show that included anecdotes and frank stories told between songs, and continued working as a DJ on the radio in San Diego while playing around town and, later, touring. Her recorded debut was a five-song EP called Exercises in Racketeering, which eventually led to a full-length album, Miss Halfway, which was released January 25, 2005. Anya subsequently opened for Jason Mraz, Juliana Hatfield and Rhett Miller among others. She was named one of the "Best Unsigned" acts by the San Diego CityBeat. Miss Halfway was produced by Scott Russo, the frontman for rockers Unwritten Law, and Peter King from The Surfers. The record eventually earned a San Diego Music Award for Best Recording.

On January 20, 2009, Marina released her second album, Slow & Steady Seduction: Phase II. The album was produced by Brian Karscig from Louis XIV and Britt Daniel from Spoon. The music video for the album's first single, "Move You", was directed by Scott Coffey. On June 8, 2009, the video for "All The Same To Me", directed by Josh Forbes, premiered exclusively on it.

In the summer of 2009, Anya was nominated for three San Diego Music Awards: Artist of the Year, Album of the Year (Slow and Steady Seduction: Phase II), and Song of the Year ("Move You"). On September 10, 2009, "Move You" won the award for Song of the Year, beating out fellow nominees including Jack Tempchin and Jason Mraz.

Her song "Satellite Heart" was featured on the Twilight Saga: New Moon soundtrack. "Satellite Heart" was released October 8, 2009, with the video (directed by Scott Coffey), released on November 3, 2009. Later that same month, she performed the song at multiple venues on the nationwide 'New Moon Talent Tour'. Marina co-hosted the live MySpace broadcast of the New Moon premiere. Anya was highlighted in an article by CNN.com as an artist poised on the edge of breakout success due to her involvement in the soundtrack.

Marina's cover of "Whatever You Like", originally by rapper T.I., was featured on the November 9, 2009, episode of Gossip Girl, "They Shoot Humphreys, Don't They?"

In 2009, Marina moved to Portland, Oregon to write and record the album "Felony Flats", named after a local neighborhood. It was released three years later. In 2012, Marina moved to New York City to write and record her next album. She co-hosts a humorous podcast about relationships with roommate and comedian Nikki Glaser and comedian Phil Hanley called We Know Nothing. The pretext of the podcast is to give advice, yet the three rarely take calls, instead becoming distracted with anecdotes from their own lives and current events.

In January 2021, Marina announced a live album titled Live and Alone in New York, recorded over two nights at Rockwood Music Hall in Manhattan, set for a February 19 release.

== Discography ==
=== Studio albums ===
- Miss Halfway (January 25, 2005)
- Slow & Steady Seduction: Phase II (January 20, 2009)
- Felony Flats (March 13, 2012)
- Paper Plane (January 29, 2016)
- Queen of the Night (September 25, 2020)
- Asteroid (October 25, 2024)

=== Extended plays (EPs) ===
- Exercises in Racketeering (2004, Redroom Recordings)
- Spirit School (November 15, 2010)
- Serious Love (June 16, 2017)

=== Live album ===
- Live and Alone in New York (February 19, 2021)
