= Love & Sex =

- Theatrical poster
- Directed by: Valerie Breiman
- Written by: Valerie Breiman
- Produced by: Martin J. Barab; Timothy Scott Bogart; Darris Hatch; Brad Wyman
- Starring: Famke Janssen; Jon Favreau; Noah Emmerich; Ann Magnuson; Cheri Oteri; Josh Hopkins
- Cinematography: Adam Kane
- Edited by: Martin Apelbaum
- Music by: Pierpaolo Tiano; Billy White Acre
- Production company: Behaviour Communications
- Distributed by: Lions Gate Films
- Release dates: January 24, 2000 (Sundance Film Festival); August 25, 2000
- Running time: 82 minutes
- Country: United States
- Language: English
- Box office: $543,896

Love & Sex is a 2000 American comedy-drama film written and directed by Valerie Breiman. It stars Famke Janssen and Jon Favreau.

== Plot ==
When her rather explicit article on oral sex is rejected, magazine journalist Kate Welles is told by her editor Monique to write an article on loving relationships instead—and to do so by the end of the day or face being fired. This gets Kate thinking back over her own various misadventures searching for love over the years, and wondering if she is in much of a position to write on the subject.

Kate's first relationship, a playground romance in grade school with a boy named Bobby, ends when Kate's friend spills the details of their relationship to the entire school, humiliating Bobby. Kate goes on to lose her virginity to her ineloquent high school French teacher, Mr. Boussard, whom she accidentally insinuates has a small penis. Kate's next relationship, in college while attending UCLA, is with another older man, a music video director named Eric. Things go well with Eric for several weeks until Eric's wife and child show up unannounced while he and Kate are about to have sex; unaware that Eric was married with children, Kate storms off, heartbroken.

Kate meets the love of her life, Adam Levy, while attending the latter's art show while on a date with Richard, a boring, miserable stand-up comedian. Adam steals Kate away from Richard effortlessly. The two become instant best friends over the course of their first date, and begin living together as a happy couple thereafter. On the eve of their one-year anniversary, Kate reveals that she is pregnant. The two decide to bring the baby to term, but Kate suffers a miscarriage a few weeks later, to the emotional distress of both.

Over the next few months, the honeymoon period of Kate and Adam's relationship comes to an end, as each reveals personality traits that annoy the other. This finally culminates one night when Adam realizes that he is not happy in their relationship any longer—in his words, the timing is just off—and he wants to break up. Kate, devastated that her first successful relationship is ending, seesaws between feigned relief that they are breaking up, and her actual heartbreak. Adam moves out and begins dating other women, further distressing Kate. Kate ups the ante by becoming involved with other men simply to make Adam jealous, which slowly begins to work. After numerous fights, Kate and Adam admit that they must stop intentionally hurting each other if any friendship is to be kept between them.

Kate meets a dimwitted but good-natured B-list Hollywood actor named Joey Santino, and begins to date him. Adam's relationships with other women fizzle out, and as Kate and Joey grow more serious, he begins to realize that Kate was the right woman for him all along. Adam pleads and negotiates with Kate to take him back, but Kate refuses, reiterating what Adam said previously about bad timing. Kate finally breaks up with Joey after tiring of his lack of intellect. Adam again offers his love to a now-single Kate, but Kate, still wary of the timing, only accepts his friendship.

As the evening deadline for her copy approaches, Kate realizes that she cannot do Monique's assignment, and avoids being fired by voluntarily quitting on the spot with a hasty apology. Back at home, she prepares for a blind date with a man named Rob. A montage of everything Kate and Adam went through together—the highs and the lows of their relationship—plays in her mind. The scene then cuts to another gallery opening of Adam's. Kate shows up, having realized that the timing is finally right and that she and Adam were meant to be. Adam and Kate reconcile with a kiss and begin their relationship afresh, each a little wiser for the wear.

== Cast ==
- Famke Janssen as Kate Welles
  - Yvonne Zima as 9-Year-Old Kate
- Jon Favreau as Adam Levy
- Noah Emmerich as Eric
- Ann Magnuson as Monique Steinbacher
- Cheri Oteri as Mary
- Josh Hopkins as Joey Santino
- Robert Knepper as Gerard Boussard
- Vincent Ventresca as Richard Miltner
- David J. Steinberg as Tiny Man
- Elimu Nelson as Jerome Davis
- Claudia Christian as woman in gallery (cameo)
- David Schwimmer as door-to-door proselytizer (cameo)

== Reception ==
Roger Ebert gave the film a 2-star rating.

== Awards and nominations ==
- Best Screenplay, Independent Spirit Awards (2001) – Valerie Breiman (nominated)

== Soundtrack ==
A soundtrack was released on August 22, 2000, from BMG Classics.

- "Honeychild" (Eddi Reader)
- "Symptom of My Time" (Marie Frank)
- "Under the Light of the Moon" (The Merrymakers)
- "All Over You" (Live)
- "Save a Little Love" (Marie Frank)
- "Retrosexy" (Chucklehead)
- "It's Alright" (Phil Roy)
- "Easy" (Velvet Belly)
- "Suffer Me" (Todd Thibaud)
- "Go Down Easy" (Over the Rhine)
- "Carry Me" (Tim Easton)
- "It's Alright" (instrumental version) (Heitor Pereira)

Other songs played in the film include:

- "Giving" (Marc Ford)
- "Ladyfinger" (Convoy)
- "Bumpkin" (Dig)
- "Star Sax" (Steve Jeffries)
- "Adrenalin" (Eric Caspar)
- "Monster" (Weaklazyliar)
- "Here's Lookin at You" (Convoy)
- "Play That Funky Music" (Wild Cherry)
