= Blast from the Past (Veronica Mars) =

- Veronica Mars episode
- The audience learns that Wallace Fennel (Percy Daggs III) has left Neptune with his father, Nathan Woods (Cress Williams).
- Episode no.: Season 2 Episode 5
- Directed by: Harry Winer
- Written by: Phil Klemmer; Cathy Belben
- Production code: 2T7205
- Original air date: October 26, 2005

Guest appearances
- Jeffrey Sams as Terence Cook; Michael Muhney as Don Lamb; Erica Gimpel as Alicia Fennel; Cress Williams as Nathan Woods; Claire Titelman as Mandy; Dana Davis as Cora Briggs; Christine Estabrook as Madame Sophie

Episode chronology
← Previous "Green-Eyed Monster"	Next → "Rat Saw God"
- Veronica Mars season 2

"Blast from the Past" is the fifth episode of the second season of the American mystery television series Veronica Mars, and the twenty-seventh episode overall. Written by Phil Klemmer and Cathy Belben and directed by Harry Winer, the episode premiered on UPN on October 26, 2005.

The series depicts the adventures of Veronica Mars (Kristen Bell) as she deals with life as a high school student while moonlighting as a private detective. In this episode, Veronica helps Jackie Cook (Tessa Thompson) deal with her purported credit card fraud. Meanwhile, the Sheriff's race heats up, and Wallace (Percy Daggs III) faces the complicated aftermath of learning that Nathan Woods (Cress Williams) is actually his father.

== Synopsis ==
Directly after the previous episode, Wallace angrily confronts Alicia (Erica Gimpel) about Nathan being his father. Alicia tells Wallace that Nathan betrayed her while supposedly going on a police case and that Wallace's purported father, Hank Fennel, is his legal father. In class, Veronica nominates Wallace for homecoming king, and another boy nominates Veronica. Wallace tells Veronica that Nathan is his father before Jackie approaches and expresses her jealousy. Keith (Enrico Colantoni) tells Veronica that he has a 12-point lead in the sheriff race. In the bathroom, Jackie walks up to Veronica and tells her that she needs her help with her credit card, which has been maxed out without her knowledge. Veronica reluctantly agrees. Alicia confronts Keith for Wallace's birth certificate, which he stole in the previous episode. They get into an increasingly heated debate. Nathan talks to Wallace, and he says that he's tried to find Wallace for years and hands him letters that he sent. Wallace successfully made the nominating pool for homecoming royalty. Logan (Jason Dohring) and Jackie flirt in school. Veronica matches the credit card items with a girl named Cora (Dana Davis) and invites her to pick out homecoming dresses together to find out more. Logan and Duncan (Teddy Dunn) agree to hang out.

During a Sheriff's race debate, Sheriff Lamb (Michael Muhney) brings up the fact that Keith would have arrested Ed Doyle for a DUI if he had followed procedure. Veronica finds out that Cora could not have stolen Jackie's credit card. Duncan invites Veronica to homecoming. Keith has lost his lead in the Sheriff's race. Wallace shows Alicia the letters and she blows up at him. Veronica plants a listening device in Sheriff Lamb's office. Veronica goes to the first place the credit card was spent, the psychic shop, where Jackie went. Veronica decides to go on the psychic, Madam Sophie's, show to expose her as a fraud. Veronica, listening through the audio device, finds out that Sheriff Lamb blackmailed Jackie's father, the baseball player Terence Cook. The girl who went on the psychic's show says that she has a message from the bus crash, and Veronica listens. Veronica goes on the show, and without having told anyone, the psychic has a “message” from Lilly, but it turns out that Jackie framed Veronica to embarrass her. Wallace angrily tells Veronica to let it go while simultaneously telling Jackie that he's not going to the homecoming dance with her because of the incident.

Veronica shows Keith the message before the bus crash, and there is an explosion on the tape, indicating that the bus was sabotaged. Veronica tells Keith to use the information to his advantage, but he denies the suggestion. Homecoming occurs, where Jackie is alone and Veronica and Duncan dance. Veronica sees Jackie dancing with Logan, and Jackie yells at Veronica. Keith shows Lamb the message evidence. Alicia calls Keith and says that Wallace went missing after the prom. Veronica calls Wallace, but he doesn't pick up. We see that Wallace is driving away with his father.

== Cultural references ==
The cultural references of the episode include:

- Veronica mentions "Love Hangover".
- Logan insults someone by calling them Zippy the Pinhead.
- Veronica compares Nathan to Donnie Brasco.
- Veronica says that her coffee spill looks like a Rorschach test.
- Veronica compares Duncan to Howard Hughes.
- Sheriff Lamb and Terrence both want the latter to make the National Baseball Hall of Fame and Museum.
- Veronica paraphrases a statement supposedly uttered by Shoeless Joe Jackson.
- Keith references the album Cheap Trick at Budokan.

== Arc significance ==
- Veronica bugs Sheriff Lamb's office and finds him blackmailing Terrence Cook, who has gambling debt.
- Veronica finds a voice mail message left by a student on the bus moments before the crash and confirms, after her father hears it, that there's a sound before the bus hits the rail that could be an explosion. Keith opts not to go public with the message, giving it to Lamb instead.

== Music ==
The following songs can be heard in the episode:

- "Papa Was a Rollin' Stone" by The Temptations (sung by actor Percy Daggs III)
- "Press Record Then Play" by Lake Holiday
- "No Sleep Tonight" by The Faders
- "Whatever It Takes" by The Faders

== Production ==
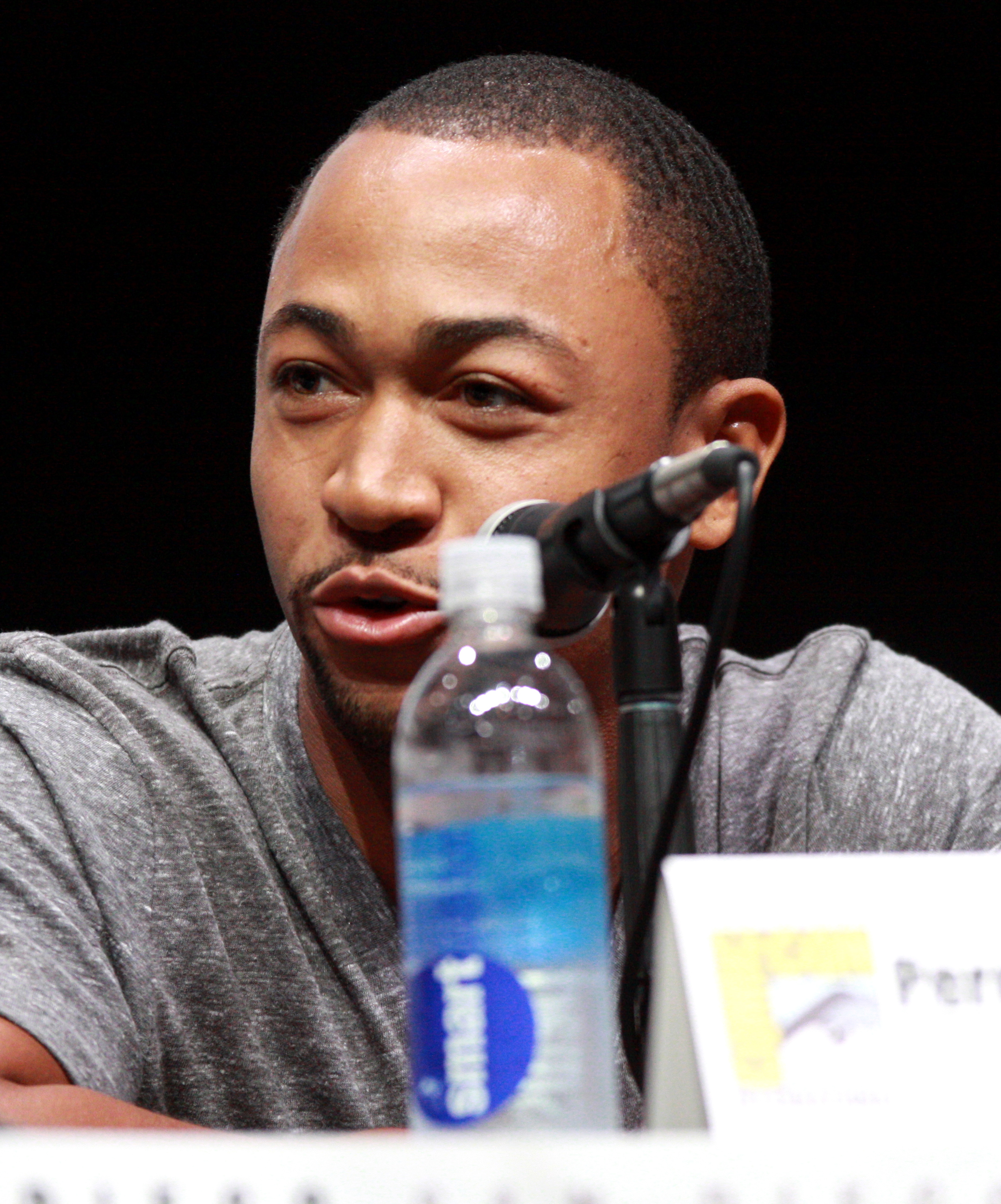
Percy Daggs III, who plays Wallace Fennel, does not appear after this episode until "One Angry Veronica".

The character of Weevil (Francis Capra) does not appear in "Blast from the Past," despite being credited. The episode features a cameo appearance by Mandy (Claire Titelman), who previously guest-starred in the first-season episode "Hot Dogs". "Blast from the Past" also marks the last episode for several months for series regulars Percy Daggs III (who plays Wallace Fennel) and Tessa Thompson (who portrays Jackie Cook). Daggs would not appear until "One Angry Veronica", while Thompson would not appear until "Rashard and Wallace Go to White Castle". The episode was written by Phil Klemmer and Cathy Belben and directed by Harry Winer, marking Klemmer's sixth writing credit, Belben's first writing credit, and Winer's second directing credit (after "Meet John Smith").

As a joke, the character of Jackie can be seen TiVoing the TV series Cupid, a show that was created by Veronica Mars creator Rob Thomas. In addition, another show on Jackie's TiVo list is Sunset and Vaughn, a fictional TV series within Cupid.

== Reception ==
=== Ratings ===
In its original broadcast, "Blast from the Past" received 3.58 million viewers, marking a sharp increase from the previous episode and serving as the series' highest rated episode overall.

=== Reviews ===
The episode received mostly positive reviews. Television Without Pity gave the episode a positive review, rating it an "A". Price Peterson, writing for TV.com, gave a mostly positive review, writing that "overall this was a good, if slightly unsatisfying episode. I think that's mostly to do with the fact that we're still early in the season so it's all just a bunch of loose ends at this point (even the case of the week ended up having no closure). Still, Veronica Mars is a much more confident, layered show than before and it's still really fun to watch."

Rowan Kaiser of The A.V. Club wrote a mixed review, saying that "This, dear readers is easily the single most melodramatic episode of the series so far. It's hard to say how I feel about it. If it's an indicator of how the season will continue from here on out, I expect a fascinating levee of exhaustion. If it's a way to raise the stakes early on, it's damn effective. There was a lot going on here, maybe too much for down the road, but it worked."
