= Illegal Tender =

Illegal Tender can refer to:

- Illegal Tender (Louis XIV)
- Illegal Tender (film)
