= No Sleep Tonight =

No Sleep Tonight may refer to:

- "No Sleep Tonight" (The Faders song), 2005
- "No Sleep Tonight" (Enter Shikari song), 2009
- "No Sleep Tonight", a song by Coney Hatch from the album Coney Hatch, 1982
- "No Sleep Tonight", a song by Mya from the album Moodring, 2003
- "No Sleep Tonight", a song by Tyler Bates from the soundtrack album 300, 2007
- "No Sleep Tonight", a song by Kirk Franklin from the album Losing My Religion, 2015
- "No Sleep Tonight", a song by Shinedown from the album Planet Zero, 2022
