= Billy White Acre =

Alison Whiteacre
- Born: Toronto, Ontario, Canada
- Genres: Folk, Rock, Alternative, Pop
- Occupations: Film score composer, Singer-Songwriter, Guitarist
- Instruments: Vocals, Acoustic Guitar, Electric Guitar, Synthesizers, Piano
- Years active: 1986–present
- Website: http://www.alisonwhiteacre.com

Billy White Acre, also known as Bill Whiteacre, is a Canadian film score composer, singer-songwriter, guitarist, and record producer. He is the founder and creative director of Big Planet Music, Inc., a Los Angeles-based music house that scores music for television, film and advertising. He is best known for his versatility as a composer and his use of open tunings and percussive guitar playing.

== Biography ==
Billy White Acre was a choirboy in his hometown of Toronto. He spent his preteen years at St Michael's College in Worcestershire, England on a singing scholarship, training in classical music, performing two services a day as head chorister, and learning the rudiments of piano and cello. Tired of singing Anglican Church music, Billy faked his voice change at 14 and returned to Toronto. He picked up the guitar in his late teens under the metal influences of Black Sabbath and Led Zeppelin and the Tele-kinetics of Roy Buchanan. The early records of Canadian singer-songwriter Bruce Cockburn turned him on to open-tuned solo guitar music, leading him to Michael Hedges, Leo Kottke, and eventually the '80s soundscapes of Johnny Marr, Adrian Belew, and Andy Summers.

After high school, White Acre moved to Boulder, Colorado to study music at Naropa University. His studies included composition with Ralph Towner, African rhythm with Kobla Ladzekpo, world music and bebop with Bill Douglas, music concrete and the electronic studio with Steve Tibbetts, and blues and jazz improvisation with Robben Ford. White Acre stayed in Colorado long enough to be voted Denver's "Best Solo Performer" in 1987 and to share the stage with Bobby McFerrin, Suzanne Vega, Al Di Meola, Big Head Todd & The Monsters, The Washington Squares, and one of his first guitar heroes, Roy Buchanan. He also made friends with Naropa teacher and howling poet, Allen Ginsberg and accompanied the Beat poet in a mixed media performance at Naropa in 1983. The experience led White Acre to write and record Automatic Forest on the occasion of Ginsberg's death in 1997.

After cutting two albums, the Windham Hill styled "Atlantis Ripples" and the folk-funk "9 Songs," in the recording studio he built, White Acre left the Rocky Mountains and landed in Los Angeles in the late summer of 1988. Not long afterwards he won the '89 Southern California Guitarist of the Year contest sponsored by BAM, KLSX Radio and West LA Music. In 1990, the earliest incarnation of White Acre's acoustic pop vision, Big Planet, won the Don Kirshner Tanqueray Rocks Talent Contest, a national competition culminating in a battle of the bands at the Ritz Carlton in New York City in October 1990. A personnel change in Big Planet in '91 brought Billy together with Holly Montgomery (bass, vocals), and Suzanne Morrisette (drums, vocals) — an energetic acoustic act rich with vocal harmonies that Billy dubbed "heavy wood." The trio won the National Academy of Songwriters Best Acoustic Band of 1991. Their first and only release, "Big Planet," was produced by Rod Stewart helmsman Jim Cregan, and engineered and mixed by Gustavo Borner.

In 1993, Big Planet's rock song, "Push the Boundaries," was featured in the heavily played national radio commercial for the Chevy Camaro which gave White Acre the resources to finance his first ADAT digital studio. He immersed himself in learning recording techniques and began producing a dozen or more local artists along with his own projects. One of these side projects was a collaboration with rock poet Dan Bern—a grungy blend of rock, folk and rap that was anything but commercial and which they irrevently called SPEW! In June 1994, Billboard and a blue ribbon panel of judges that included Quincy Jones, Dweezil Zappa, David Benoit, and David Foster awarded White Acre's song, 13th Generation first prize in the rock category. The same month, White Acre was featured in Guitar Player's cover story, "Youth Quake! 10 Trailblazers Who Can Change the Way You Play." James Rotondi wrote, "White Acre is distinguished as much by his top-notch songwriting and singing as his outrageous six-string technique."

In 1996, White Acre signed with New York-based Touchwood Records and recorded Billy's Not Bitter with the assistance of producer/engineer Joe Chiccarelli and engineers Robert Carranza and Christopher J. Roberts. Bassist Justin Meldal-Johnsen and drummer/vocalist Tom Diekmeier formed the core of the band. Billy's Not Bitter garnered yet another prize for White Acre at the Los Angeles Music Awards for Best Independent Album of 1997. The album received high marks and praise from critics who compared the effort to Sonic Youth and Weezer, but it failed to catch on with a large audience.

In the late 1990s, after scoring a few more TV commercials, White Acre segued from performing to composing for film & TV earning a BMI fellowship in the 2002 Sundance Institute Composers Lab. In 2005, he founded Big Planet Music, Inc., a custom music house and library for television, film, and advertising. Some of White's Acre film credits include "Zombie Strippers" (Sony Pictures), "Love & Sex" (Lions Gate), and "Cookers," (Pacesetter Productions), for which he earned the Best Film Score award at the Milan Int'l Film Festival in 2001. His television credits include shows scored for Discovery, National Geographic, and The History Channel.

After a long absence, White Acre has begun performing and record producing again. He produced Adios, his second album for Josh Canova, in 2009. In March 2011, White Acre produced the debut pop song, Legendary for Mr. Downstairs, a band composed of Dani Artaud and White Acre's daughter, Asia.

== Discography ==
=== Film scores ===
- Zombie Strippers
- Cookers
- Love & Sex
- Backyard Dogs
- Beyond the City Limits

=== TV scores ===
- Treasure Quest
- Pawn Stars
- Access Hollywood
- Nova

=== Albums ===
- Atlantis Ripples (1986)
- Nine Songs (1987)
- Big Planet (1991)
- Raw Things (1993)
- Billy's Not Bitter (1996)
- Olympic Swimmer (1998)
- Polywog (1998)
- Love & Destruction (1999)
- Zombie Strippers (2008)
- The Shot Felt 'Round The World (2010)
- The Apple (2011)
