= Cheatty Cheatty Bang Bang =

- Veronica Mars episode
- Episode no.: Season 2 Episode 3
- Directed by: John Kretchmer
- Written by: Phil Klemmer; John Enbom
- Production code: 2T7203
- Original air date: October 12, 2005

Guest appearances
- Michael Muhney as Don Lamb; Erica Gimpel as Alicia Fennel; David Starzyk as Dick Casablancas, Sr.; Michael Kostroff as Samuel Nelson Pope; Cress Williams as Nathan Woods; Charisma Carpenter as Kendall Casablancas

Episode chronology
← Previous "Driver Ed"	Next → "Green-Eyed Monster"
- Veronica Mars season 2

"Cheatty Cheatty Bang Bang" is the third episode of the second season of the American mystery television series Veronica Mars, and the twenty-fifth episode overall. Written by Phil Klemmer and John Enbom and directed by John T. Kretchmer, the episode premiered on UPN on October 12, 2005.

The series depicts the adventures of Veronica Mars (Kristen Bell) as she deals with life as a high school student while moonlighting as a private detective. In this episode, Veronica investigates Kendall Casablancas (Charisma Carpenter) at the request of her stepson, Cassidy "Beaver" Casablancas (Kyle Gallner) and eventually finds some important information about Logan (Jason Dohring). Meanwhile, Veronica tries to help Wallace (Percy Daggs III) get a date with Jackie Cook (Tessa Thompson).

== Synopsis ==
Veronica attends a Future Business Leaders of America meeting to build up her résumé, headed by Dick Casablancas Sr. (David Starzyk). After class, Beaver tells Veronica he believes his stepmother is cheating on his father and pays Veronica $1,000 to find proof. After finding "Veronica Mars" written on a dead body's palm, Sheriff Lamb (Michael Muhney) takes Veronica in for questioning. The man is David "Curly" Moran, whom Veronica met at the site of the bus crash. Sheriff Lamb threatens Veronica. Keith asks Alicia (Erica Gimpel) to a romantic getaway in Chicago, and she accepts. Veronica researches Kendall and her possible connection to Curly Moran. Veronica asks Keith (Enrico Colantoni) whether he is going to propose to Alicia, and he says no. Veronica tracks Kendall, who meets with an unknown man. They go to a cheap motel together, and Veronica takes pictures. Jackie comes and sits at Veronica and Wallace's table. Veronica, in order to help Wallace out, invites him and Jackie on a double date to watch the BBC adaptation of Pride and Prejudice. Beaver is not satisfied with the pictures, as there is no "money shot" and requests Veronica take more photos. Veronica agrees as long as Beaver pays for expenses. Veronica goes to Curly's place of work, where she finds Curly's possessions, including a picture of Curly with Aaron Echolls (Harry Hamlin).

In another FBLA class, Logan makes a snide remark to Duncan (Teddy Dunn), and they end up fighting. Veronica, Duncan, Wallace, and Jackie go on their double date, and Jackie is dominating the conversation irritatingly. However, Duncan and Wallace both find her interesting. At the gym, Veronica talks to Kendall and swaps Kendall's media player with one containing a hidden camera. Veronica tracks Kendall to the beach, where she is seen meeting the same man as the previous pictures. They enter a rundown motel named the Sandpiper, which Veronica recognizes as the name of a property Mr. Casablancas advertised as a high-end resort. Veronica talks to the business teacher about real estate fraud and informs him that Mr. Casablancas is inflating his company's stock value. Keith and Alicia enjoy their date, but a police officer asks for Keith and Alicia's names and where they are staying. Jackie walks into the coffee shop with another man, but Jackie says nothing the next day with Wallace.

Beaver retrieves the bugged media player from Kendall and brings it to Veronica at work. Veronica accesses the pictures and tells Beaver to go through them. While Veronica is busy Beaver sees the photos taken while Kendall was meeting Logan. Beaver suddenly disappears and leaves the pictures on the screen, causing Veronica to find out about Logan and Kendall. Neither Beaver nor Logan comes to school the next day. The police officer finds Alicia's name in the phone book. Veronica visits Logan's bedroom and tells him about the pictures, but he seems unafraid of Mr. Casablancas. Veronica notices that Curly Moran did the stunts on an Aaron Echolls film. Beaver tells Mr. Casablancas that he hired a private investigator to follow Kendall and obtain proof of her violating her prenup. Instead of being upset about the affair, Mr. Casablancas immediately tells his staff to shred all papers and then flies away in a helicopter before the U.S. Securities and Exchange Commission gets there. With her newfound knowledge, Veronica tells Duncan that she believes that the bus crash was meant to kill her.

== Cultural references ==
A variety of cultural references are made in the episode:

- Veronica uses the phrase "Excellent," referencing the catchphrase used by Mr. Burns in The Simpsons.
- When Sheriff Lamb questions Veronica about her relationship with David "Curly" Moran, she jokes that they met while he was a roadie for Whitesnake and she was a backup singer for Boyz II Men.
- Veronica references the Infinite monkey theorem.
- Keith woos Alicia by paraphrasing "Fog".
- Keith mentions Kenny G.
- Veronica compares Kendall to a Barbie doll.
- Veronica jokes that Kendall has broken her Atkins diet.
- Veronica's place of work is called "Java the Hut," a play on the character Jabba the Hutt.
- The episode frequently references Pride and Prejudice.
- The business teacher references Warren Buffett.
- Logan sarcastically refers to Nurse Ratched from One Flew Over the Cuckoo's Nest and the film of the same name.
- Logan's inspirational quote of the day is from William Makepeace Thackeray.
- Logan uses a catchphrase from I Love Lucy.

== Music ==
The following music can be heard in the episode:

- "I Turn My Camera On" by Spoon
- "Jeanie with the Light Brown Hair" by Stephen Foster
- "Love Hurts" by The Everly Brothers (Nazareth version)
- "Smoke It" by The Dandy Warhols

== Arc significance ==
- In Chicago, a man sees Alicia and calls her "Cher" and "Cheri."
- The body on the beach was David "Curly" Moran. He was a mechanic who had been the stunt coordinator on Aaron Echolls' first big movie, The Long Haul.
- Beaver gets pictures of Logan and Kendall together and shows them to his dad, Dick Casablancas Sr., but his dad isn't concerned with it. Instead, Big Dick tells his employees to shred everything and leaves in a helicopter before the SEC arrive.

== Production ==
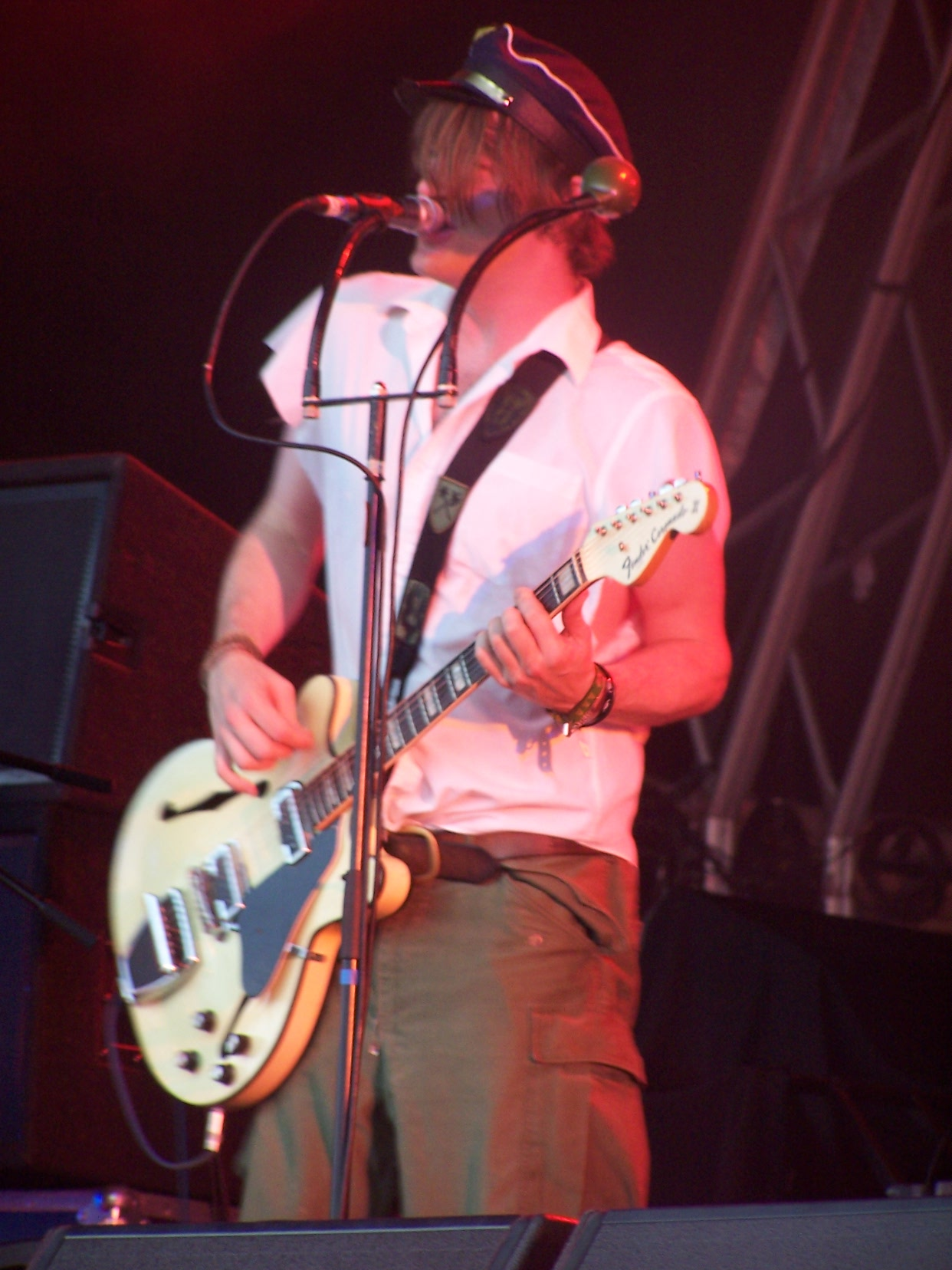
The Dandy Warhols lead singer Courtney Taylor-Taylor (pictured) made a cameo appearance in "Cheatty Cheatty Bang Bang".

The episode was written by Phil Klemmer and John Enbom and directed by John Kretchmer, marking Klemmer's fifth directing credit, Enbom's fourth writing credit, and Kretchmer's fifth directing credit. The episode's title is a tongue-in-cheek reference to Chitty Chitty Bang Bang. The episode also features a cameo appearance by The Dandy Warhols lead singer Courtney Taylor-Taylor, who sung a karaoke song in the episode. The singer also sings the series' theme song. The character of Weevil, played by Francis Capra, does not appear in the episode.

== Reception ==
=== Ratings ===
In its original broadcast, "Cheatty Cheatty Bang Bang" received 3.03 million viewers, ranking 98th of 110 in the weekly rankings.

=== Reviews ===
The episode received mixed to positive reviews from critics. Rowan Kaiser of The A.V. Club gave the episode a mixed review. "But despite generally liking…this episode, there's something that strikes me as a bit odd...Last season, Veronica's mysteries seemed grounded, and they were in many ways her response to almost random events. She was a part of the world, albeit the part of the world we viewed and sympathized with the most. This season, she seems to be the entirety of the world." Television Without Pity gave the episode a "B+".

By contrast, Price Peterson, writing for TV.com, gave the episode a positive review, writing that "the bus crash plot line continued to be pretty compelling, plus Veronica's dialogue was particularly hilarious in this episode." The reviewer also praised the episode's quick pace and advancement of the plot. "Overall the episode just flew by; Season 2 is already noticeably more self-assured and quicker-paced than I recall Season 1 being."
