= Driver Ed (Veronica Mars) =

- Veronica Mars episode
- Episode no.: Season 2 Episode 2
- Directed by: Nick Marck
- Written by: Diane Ruggiero
- Production code: 2T7202
- Original air date: October 5, 2005

Guest appearances
- Jeffrey Sams as Terrence Cook; Michael Muhney as Don Lamb; David Starzyk as Dick Casablancas, Sr.; Ari Graynor as Jessie Doyle; Gregory Thirloway as Jeff Cotter; Kristin Dattilo as Carla Cotter; Charisma Carpenter as Kendall Casablancas; Steve Guttenberg as Woody Goodman; Valorie Curry as Jane Kuhne

Episode chronology
← Previous "Normal Is the Watchword"	Next → "Cheatty Cheatty Bang Bang"
- Veronica Mars season 2

"Driver Ed" is the second episode of the second season of the American mystery television series Veronica Mars, and the twenty-fourth episode overall. Written by Diane Ruggiero and directed by Nick Marck, the episode premiered on UPN on October 5, 2005.

The series depicts the adventures of Veronica Mars (Kristen Bell) as she deals with life as a high school student while moonlighting as a private detective. In this episode, Veronica tries to help a grieving family member rule out suicide, and Wallace (Percy Daggs III) helps a transfer student. Later, a mayoral candidate asks Keith (Enrico Colantoni) to consider running for sheriff.

== Synopsis ==
Veronica learns from Duncan (Teddy Dunn) that Meg, the only survivor of the previous episode's school bus crash, is still in a coma. Sheriff Lamb (Michael Muhney) reveals to reporters that Ed Doyle, the bus driver, had previously attempted suicide. Doyle’s daughter, Jessie (Ari Graynor), asks Veronica to help prove that her father didn’t kill himself, and Veronica agrees after witnessing other students bullying Jessie. Woody Goodman (Steve Guttenberg) is running for the position of County Supervisor and asks Keith to run for sheriff. Veronica blames herself for Meg being on the bus and fights with Duncan. Logan (Jason Dohring) and Kendall (Charisma Carpenter) are nearly caught having sex by her step-children, Dick (Ryan Hansen) and Beaver (Kyle Gallner), and her husband, Dick Casablancas Sr. (David Starzyk). Mr. Casablancas invites Logan to accompany him and Dick to a firing range. Wallace meets and is immediately attracted to Jackie Cook (Tessa Thompson), a new student. He offers to help investigate when her father’s car is damaged by a hit-and-run driver. Veronica visits the convenience store clerk who was the last person to speak to Ed Doyle. She realizes that Doyle made a small purchase to get change for the store’s payphone.

Veronica uses phone records to learn that Ed Doyle made a call to his neighbors, Jeff and Carla Cotter (Gregory Thirloway and Kristin Dattilo), but they tell her he called the wrong number. Sheriff Lamb enters Jessie’s home with a search warrant and finds a suicide note saved on Ed’s computer.

Veronica visits Carla again and shares her theory that Ed’s note was actually meant to tell his wife he was leaving her. Carla reveals she and Ed were in love and assures Jessie that he would not have driven the bus off the cliff on purpose. Veronica reconciles with Duncan, and they have sex in his hotel room. She runs into Logan as he is leaving his and Kendall’s room. Beaver finds a condom wrapper in the Casablancas living room. Keith tells Woody he has decided not to run for sheriff but changes his mind after seeing Lamb refuse Jessie’s request to reopen her father’s case. Wallace identifies the hit-and-run driver as a reporter who was posing as a student to get information about the bus crash victims. Wallace gets her insurance information, and Jackie rewards him with a kiss. Sheriff Lamb inspects a dead body that has washed up on the beach and finds “Veronica Mars” written on the man’s palm.

== Cultural references ==
A variety of cultural references are made in the episode:

- Veronica tells Jessie, "you must chill," referencing a line from Say Anything....
- The episode references "Afternoon Delight".
- Veronica references a scene in Good Will Hunting.
- The clerk calls Veronica Marilyn Munster.
- Veronica jokingly tells Wallace to go on The Oprah Winfrey Show if she dies unexpectedly.
- Cervando, the PCH biker who was killed in the bus crash, allegedly cried when he saw Stand and Deliver for the first time.
- Wallace references Drew Barrymore's character in Never Been Kissed.

== Arc significance ==
- Meg Manning is the only survivor of the bus crash, but she's in a coma.
- Ed, the bus driver, had a history of depression and Sheriff Lamb finds what appears to be a suicide note. Veronica tries to prove that he was leaving his wife, but Lamb doesn't listen and closes the bus crash case.
- Baseball team owner Woody Goodman is running for the position of Balboa County Supervisor—a position more commonly known as 'Mayor of Neptune' - and he wants Keith to run for Sheriff. After seeing Lamb refuse Jessie Doyle's pleas to reopen the bus crash case, Keith accepts.
- A dead body washes up on the shore. Sheriff Lamb searches it and finds written on its hand is the name "Veronica Mars."

== Music ==
In addition to the series' theme song, "We Used to Be Friends", by The Dandy Warhols, the following songs can be heard in the episode:

- "The Minor Waltz" by Asylum Street Spankers
- "Magic Bus" by The Who
- "On Your Porch" by The Format
- "Little Miss Get Around" by Lukewarm Freeda
- "Where Is My Mind?" by Pixies

== Production ==
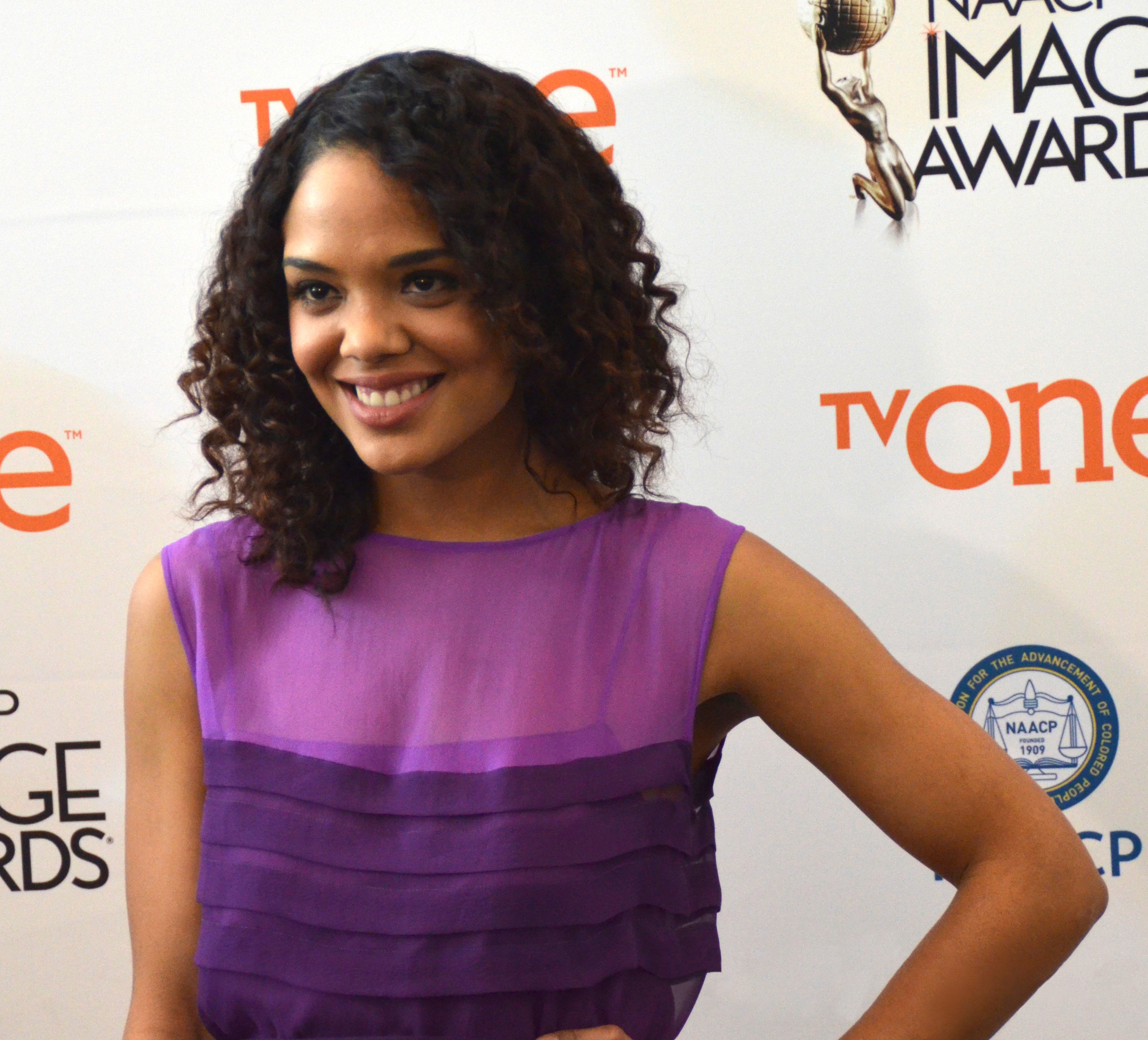
"Driver Ed" features the first appearance of Jackie Cook (Tessa Thompson), a series regular for the show's second season.

The episode features a special guest-starring appearance by Kevin Smith, who plays the store clerk Duane Anders in the episode. Smith rose to fame for his 1994 black-and-white comedy film Clerks, which he wrote, directed, and starred in as Silent Bob. Other one-episode guest stars in the episode are Ari Graynor and Miko Hughes. "Driver Ed" also marks the first appearance of Jackie Cook (Tessa Thompson), who is a series regular for the show's second season. She would later become known for her roles in For Colored Girls, Selma, the Marvel Cinematic Universe and Dear White People. In the latter, she co-starred with Veronica Mars cast member Kyle Gallner. Another first appearance which takes place in this episode is that of Dick Casablancas, Sr. (David Starzyk). The episode was written by regular writer Diane Ruggiero and directed by Nick Marck, marking Ruggiero's eighth writing credit for the series as well as Marck's fifth directing credit.

== Reception ==
=== Ratings ===
In its original broadcast, the episode received 2.73 million viewers, ranking 106th of 155 in the weekly rankings.

=== Reviews ===
Price Peterson of TV.com wrote that "Driver Ed" was "another great episode that continued increasing the soapier aspects of the show. I especially appreciated that Wallace took the reins on his own investigation…I love that the big mystery is unfolding in the present-tense rather than in flashbacks." Rowan Kaiser, writing for The A.V. Club, gave a mostly positive review, writing that "it's good to see [Keith and Veronica] having moments of pure goodness in this episode."

Conversely, Television Without Pity gave the episode a "B−".
