= Hot Dogs (Veronica Mars) =

- Veronica Mars episode
- Aaron Echolls (Harry Hamlin) beats up Dylan Goran (Jeff Parise) after he learns that the latter abused Trina (Alyson Hannigan, visible in the background). The scene, which was accompanied by the song "That's Amore", was critically acclaimed.
- Episode no.: Season 1 Episode 19
- Directed by: Nick Marck
- Written by: Dayna Lynne North
- Production code: 2T5718
- Original air date: April 19, 2005

Guest appearances
- Alyson Hannigan as Trina Echolls; Lisa Thornhill as Celeste Kane; Amanda Seyfried as Lilly Kane; Max Greenfield as Leo D'Amato; Claire Titelman as Mandy; Matthew Carey as Hans; Jeff Parise as Dylan Goran; Harry Hamlin as Aaron Echolls

Episode chronology
← Previous "Weapons of Class Destruction"	Next → "M.A.D."
- Veronica Mars season 1

"Hot Dogs" is the nineteenth episode of the first season of the American mystery television series Veronica Mars. Written by Dayna Lynne North and directed by Nick Marck, the episode originally aired on UPN on April 19, 2005.

The series depicts the adventures of Veronica Mars (Kristen Bell) as she deals with life as a high school student while moonlighting as a private detective. In this episode, a student named Mandy (Claire Titelman) hires Veronica to help find her lost dog. Meanwhile, the Echolls family deals with Trina's (Alyson Hannigan) domestic abuse, and Weevil (Francis Capra) gets arrested for breaking into the Kane home.

== Synopsis ==
Veronica tutors Weevil in math. Weevil tells her that the word is that Duncan (Teddy Dunn) ran off because she told Duncan that he killed Lilly. Meanwhile, a girl, Mandy, loses her dog, Chester. The next day at school Logan (Jason Dohring) tells Veronica that he has no idea where Duncan went. Mandy talks to Veronica about her dog, and she agrees to help. Wallace (Percy Daggs III) tells Veronica that Weevil broke into the Kane house the previous night and was found in Lilly's (Amanda Seyfried) bedroom. Veronica visits Weevil who says that he broke in to steal back a ring he gave to Lilly. Trina talks to Aaron (Harry Hamlin) before Logan comes in and makes sarcastic comments. A lawyer appears and says that Lynn did not include Aaron and Trina in her will, while she gives Logan $115,000 and other assets. Veronica and Mandy visit the pound, but according to a classmate, Hans, the pound hasn't found the dog. Later Hans calls Veronica from the pound and tells her that Chester had been hit by a car on the highway the previous day. The next day, Veronica notices that the board near the beach is now covered with lost dog notices and deduces that dog notices with expensive rewards got their dogs back, while the others did not. Celeste (Lisa Thornhill) walks into Mars Investigations and she blames Veronica for her family's problems. Veronica tells Celeste that she'll tell her what happened with Duncan (even though she doesn't know) if the Kanes drop the charges against Weevil.

Veronica posts a fake lost dog notice as bait. Logan finds out that Trina is a victim of domestic violence. Wallace tells Veronica that their parents were making out last night. Veronica gets a lead on the lost dog notice and she sends Wallace to take care of it. Wallace meets a Spanish-speaking man and Veronica secretly places a tracker on him. Veronica tracks the man and he and his friends say that they get the dogs from a "dog man." Veronica enters a mysterious van, but Hans, the owner, denies any involvement. Weevil walks up to Veronica, indicating that he was released under Celeste's orders. Logan asks Veronica for help in tracking down Trina's boyfriend, Dylan. Aaron, seemingly oblivious, asks Trina to bring her boyfriend over that night. Veronica finds out that the man's name is Dylan Goran (Jeff Parise), who has been put under two restraining orders recently by ex-girlfriends. Dylan comes over to the house. Suddenly, Aaron grabs Dylan and starts to beat him up. Eventually, Dylan is helpless on the ground before Logan and Veronica arrive. Logan and Veronica escort Dylan to his car and he drives off the premises. Logan and Veronica talk about Lilly and Weevil, but Veronica doesn't know who she actually cared about more, but she does know that Lilly loved Logan. After talking some more, Veronica and Logan kiss again and decide to start secretly dating.

Veronica talks to Mandy and they decide to visit the pound to report Hans. Veronica breaks up with Leo and reveals that she kissed Logan. However, they decide to remain friends and Leo helps them get an official search for the pound. After opening a locked door, they find all the "lost" dogs. After Mandy tases Hans, he reveals that Chester is not dead—he was sold when they couldn't get a ransom. Later, Veronica finds out from Leo that Weevil was not just looking for a ring—he was stalking Lilly. Keith tells Veronica that he already knew this, but had been ruled out due to an airtight alibi. Mandy and Veronica visit the woman who had bought Chester. Veronica confronts Weevil about breaking into Lilly's room; he wasn't looking for a ring, he was looking for a "secret message pen" Lilly used to have. He gives the pen to Veronica, but the pen is empty and he is evasive when Veronica asks if the pen had a message in it when Weevil found it.

== Cultural references ==
A variety of cultural references are made in the episode:

- Mandy is reading Forever by Judy Blume.
- Aaron says that Los Angeles Lakers coach Phil Jackson gave him the novel Siddhartha to read.
- Logan imitates Yoda.
- Hans references One Hundred and One Dalmatians.
- Weevil mentions Get Out of Jail Free cards from the board game Monopoly.
- Trina compares Aaron's would-be role in Dylan's film to John Travolta's character in Pulp Fiction.
- After watching Aaron beat up Dylan, Logan says "Father knows best," a reference to the radio and television show of the same name.

== Arc significance ==
- Weevil breaks into Lilly's room and steals a pink "spy pen" that Lilly used to hold secret messages. He gives it back to Veronica, but it's empty.
- Keith discreetly takes hair samples from Veronica in order to test her DNA in relation to his.
- Aaron's violent nature is highlighted.
- Logan's claims of being abused by his father as a child are made more likely by Aaron's behaviour. Also, Aaron himself remembers being beaten and abused by his own father during childhood.

== Music ==
In addition to the series's theme song, "We Used to Be Friends", by The Dandy Warhols, the following music can be heard in the episode:

- "Marc" by Louis XIV
- "That's Amore" by Dean Martin

== Production ==
The episode features several recurring characters, including Trina Echolls (Alyson Hannigan), Celeste Kane (Lisa Thornhill), Lilly Kane (Amanda Seyfried), Leo D'Amato (Max Greenfield), and Aaron Echolls (Harry Hamlin). The episode was directed by Nick Marck and written by Dayna Lynne North and marks Marck's fourth directing credit and North's third writing credit. The title of "Hot Dogs" is a play on the kind of food, as the case-of-the-week of this episode deals with dogs. Two of the dogs seen on the noticeboard during the episode, named Shakes and Lola, are also the names of two of lead actress Kristen Bell's dogs, who are both Corgi mixes.

== Reception ==
=== Ratings ===
In its original broadcast, the episode received 2.48 million viewers, ranking 108th of 116 in the weekly rankings and marking an increase in 180,000 viewers from the previous episode, "Weapons of Class Destruction".

=== Reviews ===
The episode received critical acclaim. Price Peterson, writing for TV.com, gave the episode a glowing review, particularly praising the Echolls family subplot. "This was a real good [sic] episode, just chock-a-block with entertaining moments. Not only were things starting to get pretty tense in Veronica's life, some of the scenes between the Echollses were downright haunting…the amazing beatdown scene that concluded with Logan finding his father beating another man with his belt, and this think was just pathos city." Television Without Pity gave the episode an "A".

Rowan Kaiser of The A.V. Club gave a positive review, praising the way the many story lines intersected. She also praised how the episode did a good job of adding to the season arc while also providing meaningful in-episode story lines. Vulture ranked the episode's use of "That's Amore" on its list of "16 Perfect Musical Moments from Veronica Mars", calling it "A smart and unsettling ode to Pulp Fiction."
