= Eon McKai =

American porn director (born 1980)

- McKai in 2007
- Born: 1980 (age 45–46)
- Occupation: Adult film director
- Years active: 2004–2011

Eon McKai (born 1980) is an American director of alt porn-themed pornographic films. The name "Eon McKai" is a pseudonym and a tribute to punk singer Ian MacKaye. Ian MacKaye considers this "surreal", but has said that he does not lose sleep over the matter.

== Career ==
McKai was involved in the internet-based alt porn scene soon after its emergence and photographed some of the early sets on SuicideGirls. After graduating from the California Institute of the Arts School of Film/Video, he decided he wanted to go into directing pornography and introduced himself to pornographic film director Veronica Hart. Hart put him in touch with the adult video company VCA Pictures, who signed him as a director in 2004. In 2006, after producing several features for VCA, McKai was signed by Vivid to head a new imprint of theirs called VividAlt.

McKai's films are alt porn-themed hardcore pornographic films, casting younger actors with an "alternative" punk, goth, or otherwise subcultural look, many of whom are not established porn actors. Going against the predominant trends in adult video, McKai prefers to shoot features with a plotline and high production values rather than gonzo porn. His influences include Andy Warhol, early "artistic" pornographic directors such as Alex de Renzy, The Dark Brothers, and Stephen Sayadian, as well as the aesthetic of alt porn websites such as SuicideGirls, BurningAngel, and GodsGirls.

In 2005, McKai directed a music video for Louis XIV's album The Best Little Secrets Are Kept, featuring the song "Paper Doll". The video was released exclusively on the alt porn website SuicideGirls.

After a personal revelation at the AVN Adult Entertainment Expo in 2010, McKai completed his contractual obligations to Vivid Alt and retired from the industry. He spent some time recovering from a heavy meth addiction, then opened a small post-production studio, hiring former pornographic actors and directors to help them transition out of the industry.

== Reception ==
McKai's work was well received by alt porn fans, but was also criticized by those who feel that he appropriated the aesthetic of alternative subcultures for use in pornography, or who questioned his credibility and connection to alternative subcultures. After leaving the porn industry, one of the actresses in his films, Keiko, referred to McKai as "edgy as a butterknife". Others, such as porn reviewers Roger Pipe and Scott McGowan, denounced McKai for what they see as his artistic pretensions, with McGowan stating "If people jack off to your art, you're not the artist you think you are". McKai's namesake commented that “the whole punk-porn thing is really just about fashion. If I put on a hat, chaps, and spurs and made a cowboy-porn movie, it wouldn’t make me a real cowboy.” Tristan Taormino, however, defended McKai's work as authentically based on his own lifestyle and sense of aesthetics, and views the idea of creating artistic porn as much more worthy than simply churning out product.

== Filmography ==
=== Director ===
- Art School Sluts (2004)
- Kill Girl Kill 1-3 (2005)
- Paper Doll (music video for Louis XIV) (2005)
- Neu Wave Hookers (2006)
- Girls Lie (2006)
- Debbie Loves Dallas (2007)
- The Doll Underground (2007)
- On My Dirty Knees (2008)
- Art School Girls Are Easy (2009)
- Content (2009)
- Tres Flores (2009)
- Eyelashes (2010)

=== Producer / Executive Producer ===
- The Rebelle Rousers (2006)
- Man's Ruin (2007)
- Morphine (2008)
- Circa '82 (2008)
- Sugar Town (2008)
- Live In My Secrets (2009)
- Pussy a Go Go! (2009)

=== Self ===
- SexTV (Documentary) (2007)
- Debbie Does Dallas Again (TV Series)
- The New Erotic: Art Sex Revolution (2011)
