= Claire Titelman =

American actress and stand-up comedian

Claire Titelman is an American actress and stand-up comedian best known for her regular appearances as a roundtable panelist on Chelsea Lately, as well as her roles on Parks and Recreation, New Girl and Veronica Mars.

== Theatrical work ==
Titelman wrote and acted in Lemons Are for Emergencies Only, which was performed in her own kitchen in Los Angeles in 2006 before appearing at the Edinburgh Festival Fringe in 2007. Her play In Tubes was produced at HERE Arts in NYC, and her solo show Filthy was performed at experimental Los Angeles theater Machine Project in 2015.

She is a member of the Wet the Hippo collective (Best Comedy nominee at L.A. Fringe Festival) and a graduate of Upright Citizens Brigade.

Claire performed in the October 2011 edition of Don't Tell My Mother!, as well as the subsequent Best of Don't Tell My Mother! at the Comedy Central stage in June 2012. She was named one of "8 L.A. Artists and Art-World Figures to Watch in 2016" by LA Weekly.

== Filmography ==
=== Film ===
Year	Title	Role	Notes
2004	Dinocroc	Reporter #4	
2005	The Good Humor Man	Barfetta	
2005	American Pie Presents: Band Camp	Claire	Video
2005	Take Out	Janelle	
2011	Captain Fork	Lunch Date	Short
2013	Dr Awkward	Ceremony Director	Short
2014	Actresses	Claire	Short
2015	Frank and Cindy	Claire	
2018	Magic Bullet	Clerk	Short
2024	Ghostbusters: Frozen Empire	News Correspondent	

=== Television ===
Year	Title	Role	Notes
2005	Life on a Stick	Female Employee	"Pilot"
2005	Veronica Mars	Mandy	"Hot Dogs", "Blast from the Past"
2009	Cold Case	Joan Rasky (1958)	"Libertyville"
2011	Parks and Recreation	Nancy	"Citizen Knope"
2012	New Girl	Val	"Fancyman: Part 1"
2012	West Side Stories	Anna	TV film
2012–13	Breaking Good	Miss Feldman	TV series short
2013	I Am Radio	Cool Dee	TV short
2013	Wilfred	Dog Walker	"Regrets"
2014	Do It Yourself	Female Customer	TV film
2015	Get Your Life	Claire	"Girl Get Your Blacktresses"
2016	Therapy		"Shelly/The Dresser & the Cellist"
2016	Shady Neighbors	Amy	TV film
2017	Powerless	Susan	"Wayne Dream Team"
