= The Faders =

British female pop rock band (2004–2006)

- (l-r) Molly Lorenne, Cherisse Osei, Toy Valentine

Background information
- Origin: London, England
- Genres: Pop rock
- Years active: 2004–2006
- Label: MCA Music, Inc./Polydor
- Past members: Molly Lorenne; Toy Valentine; Cherisse Osei

The Faders were a British female pop rock band, formed in January 2004 by Polydor Records. Bassist and keyboardist Toy Valentine and drummer Cherisse Osei were the first members to get through the first audition. Frontwoman and lead guitarist, Molly Lorenne (daughter of Midge Ure and Annabel Giles), was later introduced to the band by a mutual friend, completing the lineup.

== Members ==
- Molly Lorenne (born Molly Decima Ure, 7 March 1987) – lead vocals and lead guitar
- Toy Valentine (born 4 July 1985) – bass, rhythm guitar, keyboards, backing vocals, songwriting
- Cherisse Osei (born 23 December 1986) – drums, backing vocals

== Career ==
After signing to Polydor, the band released their debut single, "No Sleep Tonight", which reached No. 13 in the UK Singles Chart, in March 2005. Their second single, "Jump", came out a few months later and reached No. 21. In April 2006, weeks before the third single "Look At Me Now" was released, the band was dropped from Polydor. The band made fun of this fact by wearing slogan T-shirts saying "Polygone" in a style mimicking the Polydor logo. With various members of the group not wanting to look for another record deal, news of the group splitting appeared on their MySpace page, mailing lists and official forum on 6 July 2006.

=== Live performances ===
The band performed at The Jersey Telecom – Summer Sizzler tour, in Jersey, on 9 July 2005. They also played four performances at the 100 Club in London, England, and various summer Party in the Parks. They supported American Idol winner Kelly Clarkson on the UK portion of her 2006 Breakaway World Tour.

They also performed at Southampton Common on 5 June 2005.

=== Songs used in other media ===
"No Sleep Tonight" was featured in:

- "Blast from the Past", episode 5 of the 2nd season of Veronica Mars, along with "Whatever It Takes". The Faders themselves appear in the episode, performing at the Neptune High School Homecoming dance. "No Sleep Tonight" also appears on the show's soundtrack.
- Season 2, Episode 8 of Grey's Anatomy
- The soundtrack of the British television series Sugar Rush.
- Television commercial in the United States for the Cingular ROKR phone with iTunes.
- Television commercial in the United States for VO5 Extreme Style hair products (It is also featured on the VO5 website).
- Television commercial in the United Kingdom for the Vodafone "Stop The Clock" campaign.
- McDonald's music toys in Happy Meals, worldwide in 2006.
- Opening credits sequence and soccer scene in an Amanda Bynes' movie called She's the Man
- A soccer scene and on the soundtrack of The Sisterhood of the Traveling Pants
- The song is also in the trailer of Bratz The Movie
- Scene where Ben runs to Hannah's house in My Super Ex-Girlfriend (Molly McQueen Version)
- The pilot episode of ABC Family's Greek.
- The TV documentary Chelsea: The Inside Story, about the popular London-based football team.

"Jump" and "Whatever It Takes" were featured in:

- The Sims 2: Nightlife, re-recorded into Simlish, the unique language created by Maxis for the game. The songs are titled "Bunge" and "Wanebo Da Way" in the game.

=== Post-breakup careers ===
All three members currently have new music-related projects. Toy Valentine has begun a new music project. Molly Lorenne was signed by EMI then subsequently dropped, and is performing under the name "Molly McQueen". She re-released "No Sleep Tonight", which appeared on the soundtrack of the 2006 film My Super Ex-Girlfriend. Cherisse Osei joined the Swedish band Calaisa, then played for Mika before joining Bryan Ferry's band. In 2016 Cherisse joined Scottish rock band Simple Minds on their new Acoustic album and tour.

== Discography ==
=== Albums ===
- Plug In + Play (2005)

=== Singles ===
- "No Sleep Tonight" (2005) UK No. 13
- "Jump" (2005) UK No. 21
- "Look At Me Now" (2006) − originally scheduled for 17 April 2006 release, but was cancelled due to the band splitting up.
