= Green-Eyed Monster (Veronica Mars) =

- Veronica Mars episode
- Episode no.: Season 2 Episode 4
- Directed by: Jason Bloom
- Written by: Dayna Lynne North
- Production code: 2T7204
- Original air date: October 19, 2005

Guest appearances
- Erica Gimpel as Alicia Fennel; Michael Muhney as Don Lamb; Cress Williams as Nathan Woods; Laura Bell Bundy as Julie Bloch; Michael E. Rodgers as Collin Nevin; Geoff Pierson as Stewart Manning; Tina Majorino as Cindy "Mac" Mackenzie; Katie Mitchell as Rose Manning; Anastasia Baranova as Lizzie Manning

Episode chronology
← Previous "Cheatty Cheatty Bang Bang"	Next → "Blast from the Past"
- Veronica Mars season 2

"Green-Eyed Monster" is the fourth episode of the second season of the American television series Veronica Mars, and the twenty-sixth episode overall. Written by Dayna Lynne North and directed by Jason Bloom, the episode premiered on UPN on October 19, 2005.

The series depicts the adventures of Veronica Mars (Kristen Bell) as she deals with life as a high school student while moonlighting as a private detective. In this episode, Veronica helps a woman named Julie (Laura Bell Bundy) find out whether her boyfriend, Collin (Michael E. Rodgers), is cheating on her. Meanwhile, Nathan Woods (Cress Williams) shows up in Neptune and gives some new information regarding Alicia Fennel (Erica Gimpel).

== Synopsis ==
Veronica calls the hospital to see whether or not Meg Manning (Alona Tal) has been moved from the ICU. Afterward, a woman, Julie, comes to Mars Investigations and says that she needs Keith (Enrico Colantoni) to investigate whether or not her boyfriend, Collin, is cheating. As she is leaving, Keith comes in and tells Veronica that he can't take on another case due to his Sheriff's run. He requests Veronica call Julie and cancel. However, Veronica only pretends to call Julie, deciding to take it on herself as she needs money for college. Veronica meets with Julie, who explains why she thinks Collin is cheating. Jackie invites Wallace to help her with trigonometry. The police officer from the previous episode, Nathan Woods, pulls up to Alicia's house. Alicia tells Keith about her problem with Nathan, and he agrees to help. Wallace and Jackie (Tessa Thompson) are being very flirtatious in school. Nathan tries to break into Alicia's house until Keith shows up. Keith thinks that he is a criminal named Carl Morgan, although he's not. Veronica attempts to visit Meg in the hospital and finds Duncan (Teddy Dunn) waiting there. Meg's parents angrily tell both of them to leave. Collin goes into a woman's house, and Veronica takes pictures and sends them to Julie. After investigating further, Veronica finds out that Collin is actually just seeing a rabbi and tackles Julie before she can barge into the house.

Julie requests more surveillance on Collin, and Veronica agrees for an extra $1,000. Keith goes to Sheriff Lamb and tells him about "Carl Morgan." While talking to Weevil, Veronica realizes an earring the Sheriff's Office gathered as evidence in the death of David "Curly" Moran belongs to him. When Veronica questions how the earring was collected as evidence, Weevil tells her he received an anonymous call saying that Curly was behind the bus crash. Veronica calls Wallace (Percy Daggs III) for help with Julie's case, and he leaves Jackie by herself, leading Jackie to feel jealous. Veronica, disguised as a sorority girl, investigates Collin by going to his house, pretending to have a flat tire, and attempting to seduce him while Wallace films. Veronica tells Wallace about the guy she saw with Jackie the other night, and he shrugs it off. Veronica, pretending to need a computer, goes into Collin's house. Veronica tries to seduce him once again, but he denies her advances. On the computer, Veronica copies all of Collin's files onto a hard drive, and Collin tells her that this is not his house—he is house-sitting for Nicolas Cage. Veronica sends Wallace to distract Collin while the files download. Veronica and Duncan share a romantic dinner, but it is ruined when Veronica brings up Meg. Later, Veronica looks at Collin's files and finds out that he has been researching Julie's wealthy family.

Late that night, Meg's younger sister, Lizzie (Anastasia Baranova), shows up at Duncan's suite. Lizzie asks Duncan if he can remove any private information from Meg's laptop before her parents see it. Lizzie finds Veronica hiding in Duncan's bedroom, and is mad until Veronica says she knows someone who can help. Veronica decides to call Mac (Tina Majorino) for help. Mac successfully stores all Meg's information onto an external drive and gives it to Duncan. Julie calls Veronica, and Veronica tells her that Collin is being completely faithful. Veronica almost looks at Meg's files on the external drive before thinking better of it. Sheriff Lamb calls Keith and tells him that "Carl Morgan" is actually a police officer named Nathan Woods. Veronica meets with Julie, and tells her that Collin is housesitting, and his supposed house and car are not actually his and that he looked up Julie's family online. Keith walks in and realizes Veronica took the case behind his back. He scolds Veronica for taking on the case and for staying overnight at Duncan's. Veronica calls Julie, who informs Veronica she broke up with Collin. Veronica sends Julie information showing that Collin was likely planning on proposing, but Julie continues to worry about the fact Collin might be poor and Veronica hangs up on her. Veronica finds out that Collin is from an extremely wealthy family. She sends Julie a package with information about Collin, and advises her they were both lying about their wealth. After mixing up cases when talking to a client, Keith apologizes to Veronica and admits he needs her help. Veronica investigates Weevil's story about the phone call and eventually connects it to a landline at the Echolls' house. Logan (Jason Dohring) denies placing the call, but says that he threw a party that night and it could have been anyone in attendance. He also tells Veronica that Weevil unexpectedly showed up at the party. Keith digs further into Alicia's backstory, and Nathan shows up at Alica's house and tells Wallace that he is Wallace's father.

== Cultural references ==
The following cultural references are made in the episode:

- Veronica references the song "Mr. Brightside".
- Jackie mentions Dungeons & Dragons.
- Keith and Carl reference dialogue from The Big Lebowski between The Dude and Da Fino, referring to his "old lady/special lady friend".
- In the hospital, a call can be heard for "Dr. Godot".
- Veronica says "Ruh-roh", a famous catchphrase by Scooby-Doo.
- Weevil references Martha Stewart's role in the ImClone stock trading case.
- Jackie calls Veronica "Miss Pixy Stix".
- Wallace mentions Lolita.
- Collin is house-sitting for Nicolas Cage.
- Veronica makes a joke about Iggy Pop's drug addiction.
- Lisa Marie Presley's picture is on Nicolas Cage's bar.

== Arc significance ==
- Veronica questions Weevil about an earring the sheriff's department found that was his.
- Weevil got an anonymous call that stated "Curly" Moran was responsible for the bus crash. Veronica traces the call to the Echolls' house, but it was during Logan's Life's Short party (which both the PCHers and the sheriff's department crashed), so it could have been anyone.
- Lizzie brings Meg's laptop to Duncan and asks him to remove all of Meg's personal files. Veronica gets Mac to help.
- Keith finds out that the man he and Alicia Fennel saw in Chicago is "Carl Morgan"–an undercover alias for Nathan Woods, a Chicago cop and Alicia's ex-husband. He is also Wallace's father.

== Music ==
The following three songs can be heard in the episode:

- "Jealousy" by Stereophonics
- "Jealous Love" by Robert Cray
- "So Jealous" by Tegan and Sara

== Production ==
"Green-Eyed Monster" was written by Dayna Lynne North and directed by Jason Bloom. The episode is Bloom's first of four directing credits for Veronica Mars as well as North's fourth writing credit. The episode features the return of recurring character Cindy "Mac" Mackenzie (Tina Majorino), who had not appeared since "M.A.D.". Among other guest stars in the episode are Laura Bell Bundy and Cress Williams, who would later come to star together in the television series Hart of Dixie. The episode's title refers to the phrase "Green-Eyed Monster," a synonym for jealousy.

== Reception ==
=== Ratings ===
In its original broadcast, "Green-Eyed Monster" received 3.05 million viewers, marking an increase in .02 million viewers from the previous episode, "Cheatty Cheatty Bang Bang", and ranking 98th of 112 in the weekly rankings.

=== Reviews ===
Price Peterson of TV.com gave a positive review, saying that he "really enjoyed this episode," and that "I loved the undercover work Veronica did, and I'm getting more and more invested into her relationship with Duncan." He also praised the way the season's cohesion up to the point of this episode. "After four episodes this season already feels more cohesive and better blended than last season did. Cases of the week are set up in advance, we're learning more and more about characters' backstories, the dialogue keeps getting snappier." Television Without Pity gave the episode a "B".

Rowan Kaiser, writing for The A.V. Club, gave a mixed review, criticizing the case-of-the-week while praising the subplots. "The big problem is that the case…is too transparent. The nature of her boyfriend was expectedly twisty, but it was largely irrelevant." However, she lauded the development of the Fennels. "The Alicia Fennel subplot, which I was dubious about when introduced, may still be problematic, but it did give us more time with Keith Mars in a variety of different moods...and the twist at the end...was not one I expected, so kudos on that.
