= No Sleep Tonight (The Faders song) =

2005 single by the Faders

Single by the Faders

from the album Plug In + Play
- B-side: "I Don't Mean Maybe"
- Released: 21 March 2005
- Length: 2:59
- Label: Polydor
- Songwriters: Sara Eker, Jeff Taylor, Mark Taylor, Cheryl Parker
- Producers: Jeff Taylor, Mark Taylor

The Faders singles chronology
"No Sleep Tonight" (2005)	"Jump" (2005)

"No Sleep Tonight" is the debut single by British band the Faders, released by Polydor Records. It was released on 21 March 2005 and reached number 13 on the UK Singles Chart. It has also appeared on two soundtrack albums: the soundtrack to the television series Veronica Mars, and on the soundtrack to the film The Sisterhood of Traveling Pants. It also appears in the opening credits of She's the Man.

After the announcement of the band's split in July 2006, Molly Lorenne (a former band member and now under the name Molly McQueen) has released the song as a solo artist.

== Release history ==
Release dates and formats for "No Sleep Tonight"
Region	Date	Format	Label(s)	Ref.
United States	25 October 2005	Mainstream airplay	A&M	
