= Alt porn =

Pornography involving members of subcultures

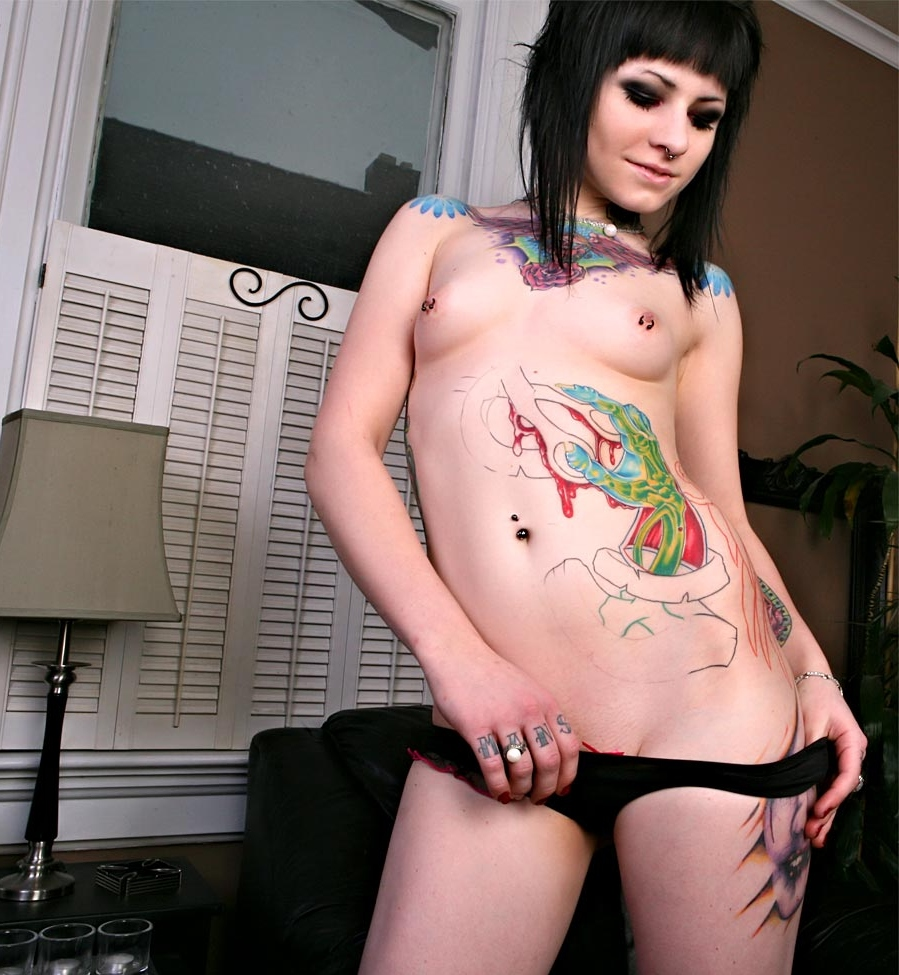
A SuicideGirls model, representative of alt pornography style, with multiple tattoos and piercings

Alt pornography (also known as alt porn, or simply alt in context), a shortening of "alternative pornography", is a subgenre of pornography that is centered around alternative subcultures, such as goths, emos, scenes, skaters, hipsters, punks, skinheads, and/or ravers, and is often produced by small and independent websites or filmmakers. It often features models with body modifications such as tattoos, piercings, or scarifications, or temporary modifications such as dyed hair or extreme makeup. The term indie porn is occasionally used, though this term is more generally used as a synonym for independent pornography, regardless of affinity with any kind of alternative subculture.

== History ==
Gregory Dark, David Aaron Clark, Michael Ninn, and Stephen Sayadian are seen as the early creators of the alt porn genre. The Cinema of Transgression of Richard Kern and Nick Zedd (as well as Kern's later photographic work) can also be viewed as early examples of alt porn.

The first venue explicitly devoted to "subcultural erotica" was Blue Blood, a glossy magazine that began in 1992 and featured models with a goth or cyberpunk look. The biggest market for alt porn however has been on the Internet. Other than a few ephemeral personal websites, the earliest explicitly alt porn site was Blue Blood's GothicSluts.com, established in early 1999. This was followed shortly after by Raverporn.net, which was later renamed EroticBPM.com, in July of the same year, and later followed by NakkidNerds in December, Supercult had appeared in 2000. By late 2001, SuicideGirls had grown to become the most popular and financially lucrative alt porn site and has been since. With the success of SuicideGirls, the number of alt porn sites has grown in number since 2002. In addition to the above-mentioned sites, well-known altporn websites in operation as of September 2008 include Lazerbunny, Burning Angel, and GodsGirls.

The terms "alternative porn" or "alt porn" were coined in the early 2000s in reference to SuicideGirls, RaverPorn, and similar sites. Longer-standing projects, such as Blue Blood, generally used terms such as "subcultural erotica".

Alt porn websites are often distinguished by their use of message boards, blogs, social networking, and other features of online community, encouraging participation by both models and viewers. While these features are not exclusive to alt porn sites, their inclusion stands in stark contrast to the standard operating procedures adopted by more typical porn sites which tend to feature more or less anonymous models who are viewed by anonymous visitors.

Alt porn-themed videos are also becoming a growing niche in the adult video market. The work of directors Stephen Sayadian and Gregory Dark during the 1980s and early 1990s had many of the features of later alt porn, and are often cited as being key contributing influences on current alt porn video. In 2001, two amateur videos under the title Technosex were produced, featuring women involved in the rave scene along with a techno music soundtrack. Since 2004, director Eon McKai has been producing alt porn-themed videos for VCA Pictures (an otherwise mainstream adult video studio) and, in 2006, was signed by Vivid Entertainment to produce alt porn-themed videos under the Vivid-ALT imprint. In 2006, McKai remade Gregory Dark's seminal punk porno film New Wave Hookers, using some of the original script with a different twist and calling the film Neu Wave Hookers. Vivid-ALT had also signed noted fetish photographers Dave Naz and Octavio "Winkytiki" Arizala.

== Controversies ==
Many members of the alt porn community disagree on the definition of alt porn. Some consider it mostly an aesthetic quality while others see it as having a more ideological definition. This includes controversies over whether alt porn sites and videos should restrict themselves to softcore pin-up photography or include more sexually explicit hardcore content, whether alt porn need be explicitly feminist or not, and whether alt porn venues should present models of all genders and a range of body types rather than just conventionally attractive young women. Since every pornography company conducts its business and treats their models differently, it is hard to define it on an ideological basis, although the models' freedom to speak their mind both about the industry, their employers, and political agendas is considered by some to be a vital part of the alt porn community. SuicideGirls have been criticized for restricting their employees' ability to make public comments of this nature. This led to a public falling out between the owners of SuicideGirls and a number of their former models, and larger debates as to whether alternative porn was inherently any more empowering than mainstream porn.
