= Louis XIV (band) =

American rock band

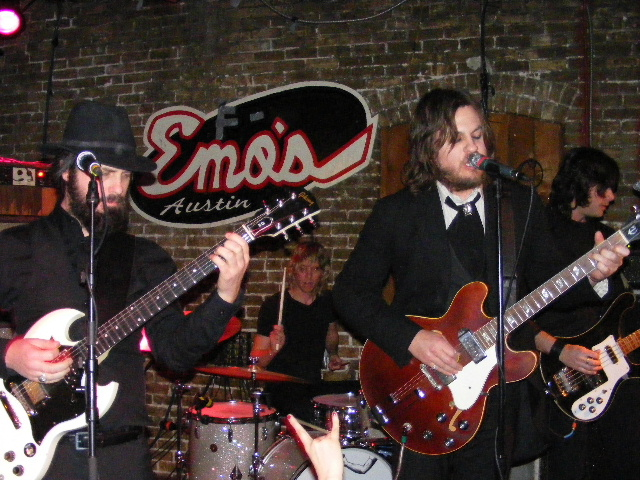
- Louis XIV performing at Emo's in Austin during South by Southwest (2008)

Background information
- Origin: San Diego, California, United States
- Genres: Post-punk revival, garage rock revival, mod revival, indie rock
- Years active: 2003–2009; 2012–2013; 2020–present
- Label: Atlantic
- Spinoff of: Convoy
- Past members: Jason Hill; Brian Karscig; Mark Maigaard; James Armbrust

Louis XIV is an American rock band from San Diego, California. The band released four EPs between 2003 and 2007, and three albums between 2003 and 2008, the latter two of which were distributed by Atlantic Records. The band broke up in 2009, but in 2013, in an interview with The Reno Dispatch, Jason Hill confirmed that the band had decided to reunite. The band broke up later that year. They reunited again in 2020 and released the single "Playtime," their first new song in 12 years. They then continued touring, playing shows in small clubs throughout the early-mid 2020s. In March 2026, they released the single "STATUES."

== History ==
=== Formation (2003–2004) ===
Lead singer and guitarist Jason Hill, guitarist Brian Karscig, and drummer Mark Maigaard formed the group in April 2003, while living in Paris, France. Bassist James Armbrust joined soon after.

The band's eponymous debut album was recorded in the spring of 2003 in a basement in the Latin Quarter in Paris on a 16-track tape machine. It was released in November 2003 through Pineapple Recording Group, a label started by Hill and Karscig. The album sold over 22,000 copies in the first six months after release, despite being sold only at shows, on the band's website, and in some independent record stores. The album became popular in the UK in 2004 after the band performed on the Jonathan Ross television show one week after Oasis. The band also performed on the Mary Anne Hobbs show on BBC Radio 1. They were embraced by Distillers frontwoman Brody Dalle and Queens of the Stone Age frontman Josh Homme at the 2004 NME Awards.

=== Illegal Tender EP and The Best Little Secrets Are Kept (2005–2007) ===
The band performed in the 2005 T in the Park festival. In reviews after the festival, the band was named "the best band of the festival. Hill recorded and released a music video for the instrumental song "The Hunt".

Independent record label Stolen Transmission released a three-song CD featuring the songs "Hey Teacher" and "God Killed the Queen". After the band returned to California, local radio stations, including XETRA-FM in San Diego, began playing an unreleased song from the band's website, "Finding Out True love Is Blind". This airplay led to the release of two simultaneous limited EPs, Pink and Blue. Eight major radio stations on the West Coast then named the single a top five song, leading to the band signing to Atlantic Records in late 2004.

The band released a self-produced EP entitled Illegal Tender in January 2005, followed in March by their second full-length album, The Best Little Secrets Are Kept, produced by Hill. The album cover depicts a naked woman with the song titles written on her back. A censored version of the cover was released in Walmart, with a portion of the woman's body cropped off. The album spawned two singles, the aforementioned songs "Finding Out True Love Is Blind" and "God Killed the Queen".

In 2005, NME called the band "music to flunk rehab to", and Rolling Stone and MTV both named it as one of their top ten bands to watch. The music video for "Pledge of Allegiance", again filmed by Hill, featured "The Best Little Secrets" cover model undressing in front of a camera. The music video for "Paper Doll" was released exclusively on the alt porn website SuicideGirls. The video, featuring various models in different stages of undress, was directed by alt-porn pioneer Eon McKai.

In 2007, David Bowie and Alicia Keys asked the band to play their BlackBall charity event for AIDS in Africa. Bowie cited Louis XIV as one of his favorite new bands in numerous Conde Nast publications. Hill and Karscig also sang on three songs on the Killers' 2006 album Sam's Town. In September 2007, violinist Ray Suen joined Louis XIV as a touring member with the Killers on the band's Sam's Town Tour throughout 2006 and 2007. The band toured Australia, Mexico, and the USA and played several AIDS in Africa charity events. The same year, two of Louis XIV's tracks, the titular "Louis XIV" and "Finding Out True Love Is Blind", were used as backing tracks on Jimmy Carr's stand-up DVD Comedian.

The band's next EP, The Distances from Everyone to You, was released through the iTunes Store on September 11, 2007. The EP contains the band's cover version of Queen's Flash Gordon theme, later used for the Sci Fi Channel's new Flash Gordon television series.

=== Slick Dogs and Ponies and breakup (2008–2009) ===
Louis XIV toured with the Killers between February and April 2009 on the band's Day & Age World Tour. The band then released their third album, Slick Dogs and Ponies, on January 29, 2008. The album spawned singles "Guilt by Association" and "Air Traffic Control", but was met with largely negative reviews.

In an interview with NME on June 30, 2009, The Killers' lead singer Brandon Flowers mentioned that he thought Louis XIV had broken up. The band confirmed this on July 3, 2009, on their MySpace blog, saying that Karscig had left the band to start The Nervous Wreckords. Karscig did not rule out the possibility of future reunions, but stated that he needed to take an indefinite break, since "Louis XIV started to feel more like a business than a camaraderie, and in that, the music started to suffer and started feeling uninspired."

=== Reunion and breakup (2012–2013) ===
After performing a number of shows on their "Return of the King" tour in 2012 supporting the Killers, Hill officially confirmed in an interview in March 2013 that the band had decided to reunite. The band subsequently split up later that year.

=== Second reunion and current activities (2020-present) ===
In February 2020, Louis XIV released the single "Playtime" and announced they were playing five shows to commemorate the 15th anniversary of "The Best Little Secrets Are Kept". However, due to the COVID-19 pandemic and Brian Karscig having a new baby, the shows were canceled.

In 2024, the band played at the North Park Music Fest in San Diego.

In January 2025, for the 20th anniversary of "The Best Little Secrets Are Kept", the band played two shows in The Casbah, San Diego.

From March to April of 2026, Louis XIV went on a five-show tour. At the same time, the band also released a new single titled "STATUES".

== ”Banned from Alabama” controversy ==
Louis XIV was known for their sexually provocative lyrics in many of their songs. In 2005, the Hoover, Alabama board of education withdrew an invitation for the band to perform a concert at Hoover High School. The board cited complaints about the lyrics of the band's songs, a recent arrest in California for drug possession, and "the likely possibility of irresponsible acts," in determining that it was "not appropriate to have a band of this kind of nature" perform at the school.

The incident has given rise to the group being "banned from Alabama". As Hill explained to Reverb Magazine on November 17, 2007, while on tour in Melbourne:

When you hang out with us, you realize that we are constantly laughing and messing around. But Hoover, Alabama banned us – we weren't allowed to perform in the city at the time. I have no idea why. We first found out about it on CNN, the night before after the VMAs in Miami, we still got paid to play the show so we just hung out in Miami another day, we needed the break anyway. It was really very idiotic, I thought. I've been called a sexist and a male chauvinist. There was a really great article in San Francisco's paper the Guardian, which was called "10 Reasons Why You Should Not Like Louis XIV," it was one of my favorite articles I've ever read about us. As it was all about the music being some of the best in the last 20 years, but that we were irresponsible morally, so everyone should avoid it. It's so far from the truth but I've even been called a racist when I used the terms "Chocolate Girl" and "Vanilla Girl". I was being playful. But in some ways, the most negative press can also be the biggest compliment.

== Members ==
- Jason Hill – vocals, guitar, bass, piano, engineering, production
- Brian Karscig – guitar, vocals, bass, piano
- James Armbrust – bass
- Mark Maigaard – drums

== Discography ==
=== Studio albums ===
Year	Details	Peak chart positions	
Year	Details	US	US Heat
2003	Louis XIV: Released: November 14, 2003; Label: Pineapple Recording Group	—	—
2005	The Best Little Secrets Are Kept: Released: March 22, 2005; Label: Atlantic Records	159	8
2008	Slick Dogs and Ponies: Released: January 29, 2008; Label: Atlantic Records	—	6

=== EPs ===
Year	Details
2004	Pink: Released: 2004; Label: Pineapple Recording Group
2004	Blue: Released: 2004; Label: Pineapple Recording Group
2005	Illegal Tender: Released: January 25, 2005; Label: Pineapple Recording Group
2007	The Distances from Everyone to You: Released: September 11, 2007; Label: Atlantic Records

=== Singles ===
Year	Song	US Alt.	SCO	UK	Album
2005	"Finding Out True Love Is Blind"	28	45	57	The Best Little Secrets Are Kept
2005	"God Killed the Queen"	-	-	68	The Best Little Secrets Are Kept
2007	"Guilt by Association"	-	-	-	Slick Dogs and Ponies
2008	"Air Traffic Control"	-	-	-	Slick Dogs and Ponies
