= Illegal Tender (EP) =

Album by Louis XIV

EP by Louis XIV
- Released: January 25, 2005
- Genre: Indie rock
- Length: 18:50
- Label: Pineapple Recording Group

Louis XIV chronology
Louis XIV (2003)	Illegal Tender (2005)	The Best Little Secrets Are Kept (2005)

Professional ratings
Review scores
Source	Rating
Allmusic	4/5 stars
Pitchfork	(4.8/10)
PopMatters	(7/10)
PunkNews	4/5 stars

Illegal Tender is the first EP by the alternative rock group Louis XIV. It was released on January 21, 2005, and features the band's first single, "Finding Out True Love Is Blind," which was also included on the band's first album, The Best Little Secrets Are Kept, released later in 2005.

== Track listing ==
1. "Louis XIV" (Hill/Karcig) – 2:42
2. "Finding Out True Love Is Blind" (Hill/Karcig) – 4:13
3. "Illegal Tender" (Hill/Karcig/Maigaard) – 3:14
4. "Marc" (Hill/Karcig) – 3:40
5. "Louis Reprise" (Hill/Karcig) – 5:01

== Personnel (incomplete) ==
- Jason Hill - guitar, vocals
- Brian Karcig - guitar, vocals
- Jimmy Armburst - bass
- Mark Maigaard - drums

== In other media ==
The song was featured in "Hot Dogs", an episode of the television series Veronica Mars.
