= Convoy (band) =

Rock band from San Diego, California, United States

Convoy was a San Diego-based rock band, composed of founding members Jason Hill, Brian Karscig, Robbie Dodds, and Mark Maigaard.

== History ==
Convoy's first song, “Weekends”, was written on a beach in Hawaii by Dodds and Hill, while touring with Dishwater. The song became a catalyst for Convoy, as they eventually dissolved Dishwater, and formed Convoy with Dishwater bass player Jeff Winfrey.

Their first recording was “Red Tape”, a 5-song self-released cassette that was recorded at Golden Track Studios in San Diego. It was recorded along with the one track, “Ladyfinger”, recorded live from the band's very first appearance, opening up for music legend, Leon Russell. The songs on the red tape are described as having a carefree honkey tonk vibe laden with rock guitars. Only one thousand copies of “Red Tape” were released.

Their next self-release, “Pineapple Recording Sessions”, was their first full-length album. The band recorded in Jamul, CA, a small rural town outside the city of San Diego. Spending much of their early years in Pacific Beach, CA, the band rented a house far from populated neighborhoods in order to write, rehearse, and record at all hours. In this secluded, small and dilapidated rental house in Jamul, the water would intermittently stop working due to the property's poor producing well, leaving the band members without running water for days. The band self-recorded at this house on an outdated analog 8-track recording machine. Limited equipment and knowledge of the recording process produced raw and authentic results. The albums sound has been compared to the Beach Boys, The Byrds, The Rolling Stones, and The Beatles. The creative environment in Jamul encouraged song writing and endless rehearsing which would then lead to tracking their songs to tape. This living while creating arrangement was modeled after The Band's recording of their “Music From Big Pink” album. The vintage and crude equipment and recording process enhanced the performance and sound. Convoy was evicted from their Jamul home and recording studio due to complaints by neighbors for making “too much noise and ruckus.” They rented another house in Jamul, only accessible by dirt roads. They were eventually evicted based on similar disturbance issues. “Pineapple Recording Sessions” won multiple San Diego Music Awards and secured the band a record deal with Hybrid Recordings, a New York-based label with ties to Atlantic Records.

Their final album, “Black Licorice”, was recorded in Burbank, CA at Mad Dog Studios and released by Hybrid Recordings. A different process for the band, they were required to enlist the help of an outside producer. Co-produced by David Bianco and Jason Hill, Black Licorice was their most commercially successful release. Some of the songs from “Pineapple Recording Sessions” were re-recorded for “Black Licorice” in an effort to land a radio hit. The rawness and blissful lo-fi of the previously self-recorded works was traded for a more glossy and polished sound. Highlights of the album are songs, “Caught Up In You” and “Eleventeen.”

Convoy performed at legendary venues, Red Rocks Amphitheater and The Great American Music Hall. With a loyal West Coast following, Convoy toured relentlessly in California and had occasional national tours that included dates opening up for the White Stripes and Coldplay. They also performed multiple shows as an opening act for Tom Petty and Aerosmith. They performed on the CBS Late Show with Craig Kilborn.

After the release of “Black Licorice” Jeff Winfrey was replaced by Shaun Cornell to play bass. Shortly after Winfrey's departure, Convoy recorded and starred in a national TV commercial for Sheraton Hotels, featuring a remake of The Rolling Stones song, “Lets Spend the Night Together”

The band disassembled in 2003 and members, Jason Hill, Brian Karscig, and Mark Maigaard formed the band Louis XIV.

== Discography ==
=== Studio albums ===
- Pineapple Recording Sessions (1999)
- Black Licorice (2001)
