= Brian Karscig =

American singer-songwriter

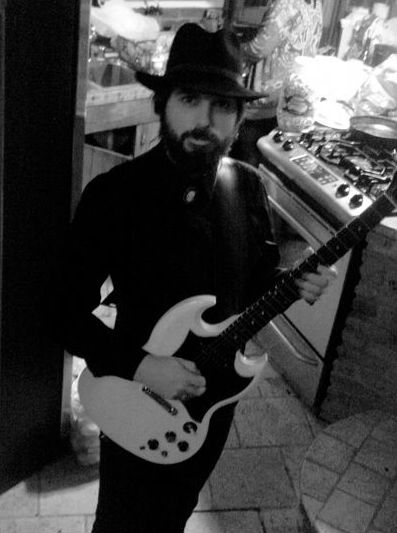

Background information
- Also known as: B Joseph Karscig, brianxiv, bxiv
- Born: Brian Joseph Karscig
- Genres: Rock, post-punk revival, alternative rock, glam rock, indie rock
- Occupations: Musician, songwriter, producer
- Instruments: Guitar, piano, vocals, bass
- Years active: 1994–present
- Labels: Atlantic Records, Pineapple Recording Group
- Formerly of: Convoy, Louis XIV, The Killers, The Nervous Wreckords
- Website: http://www.plusmusic.ai

Brian Joseph Karscig is a musician, songwriter, and record producer, but is mostly recognized as the co-singer/guitarist/songwriter for the American rock band Louis XIV signed to Atlantic Records. He also is the singer/guitarist/songwriter of the American rock band The Nervous Wreckords. Karscig owns Nervous Productions, and co-owner of "The Pineapple Recording Group", and has produced records for artists such as Anya Marina (Slow and Steady Seduction: Phase II) for Chopshop/Atlantic Records, The Silent Comedy, Transfer, Les Gars, Apes of Wrath, Republic of Letters, and Subsurfer. Aside from his songwriting with LOUIS XIV, and The Nervous Wreckords, Karscig is also known for his co-writes with Brandon Flowers of The Killers ("Thief in the Choir" and "Turn the Light On"), and Sam Endicott of The Bravery ("Send it in a Letter"), as well as Anya Marina ("Afterparty at Jimmy's) and A.J. Croce's 2013 single "Keep the Change". Karscig is also credited with additional vocals on The Killers 2006 release Sam's Town. Most recently Karscig toured South America as the piano/guitar player for Brandon Flowers "Desired Effect" Tour, and also joined The Killers as 2nd guitar/keyboard player for their 2016 US/Canada tour.

== Biography ==
Karscig was known for his high-pitched singing voice in the group LOUIS XIV and his voice was often confused with that of a female singer. He currently resides in San Diego, California where he moved at age 10. He began playing music with piano lessons and singing in the church choir at St. Joan of Arc Catholic School in Toledo, OH at age 7. He picked up the guitar at age 15, and decided at that age he wanted to be a songwriter/musician.

== Career ==
Brian Karscig along with other founding members Hill and Maigaard started LOUIS XIV in April 2003. After the break-up of alt country/alternative act CONVOY, the three left the project to pursue a more stripped-down sound and recorded their debut on their own record label (Pineapple Recording Group) self-titled LOUIS XIV. Selling more than 10,000 copies on their own and achieving radio success with their follow-up EP's the Pink EP and the Blue EP with a song called, "Finding Out True Love Is Blind", the band was signed to Atlantic records in 2004. In 2005 the songwriting team of Hill/Karscig along with drummer Mark Maigaard released and EP Illegal Tender on Pineapple Recording Group/Vice which was then followed up by their major label release of LP The Best Little Secrets are Kept by Atlantic Records. In 2007 The Distances from Everyone to You EP was released which featured a cover of Queen's song Flash Gordon, and shortly after began touring supporting their follow-up LP to The Best Little Secrets Are Kept called Slick Dogs and Ponies. Karscig appeared with Louis XIV on Late Night with Conan O'Brien performing "Finding Out True Love is Blind" as well as Friday Night with Jonathan Ross in the UK, Jimmy Kimmel Live! and Last Call with Carson Daly. He also performed "Air Traffic Control" and "There's a Traitor in this Room" on Last call with Carson Daly as well as Late Night with Conan O'Brien

Karscig is now working as a record producer/performer and is the co-founder of PlusMusic.ai. In addition to additional production on Louis XIV's "Slick Dogs and Ponies," Karscig recently completed production with artists Anya Marina's Slow and Steady Seduction Phase II, The Silent Comedy, Transfer, Les Gars, Maren Parusel, Apes of Wrath, and just recently completed production of Republic of Letters "Painted Hour" CD, and Subsurfer's "We Are Stars" LP. Karscig can also be heard singing on the two tracks "Sams Town" and "My List" on The Killers 2007 LP release Sam's Town. In 2009, after LXIV taking a hiatus, Karscig started a new band called The Nervous Wreckords. The Nervous Wreckords toured the US supporting The Killers on their 2010 "Day and Age" Tour, as well as Brandon Flowers solo tour for "Flamingo". In 2012 after sharing the stage with Cee-Lo Green for his Grammy warm up show, they embarked on a tour of the Caribbean with alt/rock act Weezer and other supporting acts Wavves, Free Energy, Yuck, and Antlers. THE NERVOUS WRECKORDS have recently appeared in Season 8 of Showtime's series Weeds with their song "Classy Girls", which also appears on the "Weeds: An Eight of the Greatest" music soundtrack. The Nervous Wreckords plan on touring in release of their new record "Let them All Talk" which features the single of the same name, and the video is currently being showcased on MTV.com VH1.com and CMT.com. 2013 also saw Karscig reuniting with LOUIS XIV for their "Return of the King" arena tour through Europe, Latin America, and Mexico supporting The Killers.
