= SuicideGirls =

Pin-up photography and community website

- Website type: Nude pin-up photography
- Available in: English; Spanish
- Owners: Selena Mooney; Sean Suhl
- Website: suicidegirls.com
- Commercial: Yes
- Registration: Yes
- Launched: September 3, 2001; 25 years ago

SuicideGirls is an online community revolving around pin-up photography models known as the Suicide Girls.

The website was founded in 2001 by Selena Mooney ("Missy Suicide") and Sean Suhl ("Spooky").

Most of the site is accessible only to paying members. It offers members access to images provided by models and photographers worldwide, as well as personal profiles, blogging platforms, and the option to join numerous groups based upon different interests. There is also an online merchandise store offering a range of clothing, books, and DVDs.

Suicide Girls have appeared in a variety of media outlets including television shows and music videos. They have also been portrayed by actresses in others, such as the character Dani California on the television series Californication.

== History ==
In 2001, Mooney returned to Portland, Oregon, to study photography after working as director of technology at Ticketmaster. Inspired by Bunny Yeager, Mooney began photographing her friends in the pinup style and wanted to create a website that featured her photographs as well as message boards and blog posts from the models. Mooney's friend Sean Suhl joined her and they founded the website. SuicideGirls was originally based in Portland, but relocated to Los Angeles, California, in 2003 to be closer to its distributor, label and publisher. That same year, 70 models from the website appeared in a music video for the band Probot.

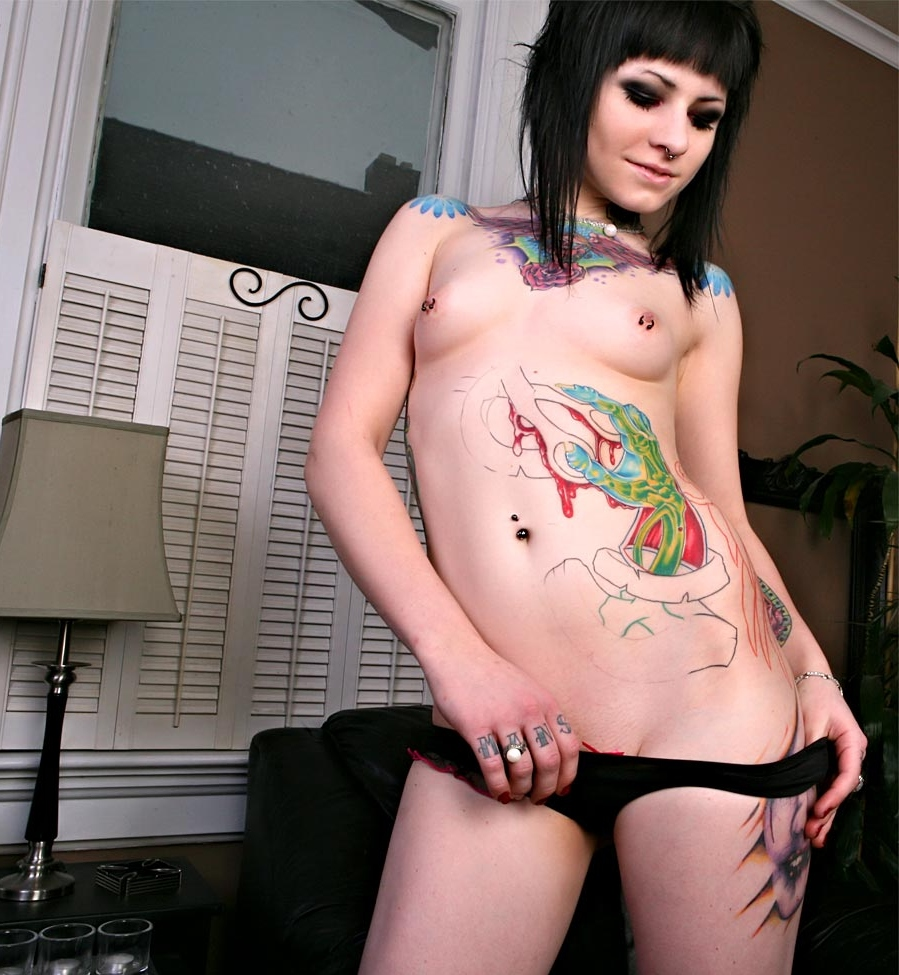
A typical SuicideGirls model

Mooney has said that the site's purpose is to give women control over how their sexuality is depicted. The site is privately co-owned. According to Missy, the term "Suicide Girl" comes from Chuck Palahniuk's novel Survivor (1999), in which a character talks about masturbating to the troubles of young girls who look up to him:

It's the same with these suicide girls calling me up. Most of them are so young. Crying with their hair wet down in the rain at a public telephone, they call me to the rescue. Curled in a ball alone in bed for days, they call me. Messiah. They call me. Savior. They sniff and choke and tell me what I ask for in every little detail. It's so perfect some nights to hear them in the dark. The girl will just trust me. The phone in my one hand, I can imagine my other hand is her.

Missy also said the name describes girls who commit "social suicide" by breaking away from societal norms, and created the site "as a place to celebrate beautiful women who choose not to fit into the norm and as a corner of the internet where outsiders could congregate and be appreciated for being themselves".

In September 2005, SuicideGirls announced that it would remove a large number of images from its pages in an effort to collaborate with the U.S. Department of Justice standards at the time. The images involved depicted bondage, weapons, or simulated blood. The Department of Justice indicated that images of that type might be the subject of obscenity prosecutions. Although SuicideGirls was not mentioned as a target, they removed the images until the furor passed. In January 2007, the images were made visible again. In 2006, some of the Suicide Girls were featured in the CSI: NY episode "Oedipus Hex".

In 2015, it was reported that the website had 5 million monthly visitors, 51 percent of them female. SuicideGirls' 15th anniversary was celebrated at its Peek-A-Boo burlesque show, which is a regular act at Pour Vous nightclub in Los Angeles, and was featured on the website of Maxim magazine. In 2017, SuicideGirls released a line of marijuana vape pens and cartridges called Chill Hustle Zero.

The site has staff photographers, but anyone can submit photosets. Actress Paget Brewster has photographed models for the site, as have guitarist Dave Navarro and singer Mike Doughty.

== Media ==
=== Movies ===
SuicideGirls have released seven movies since 2005, all directed by Mike Marshall.

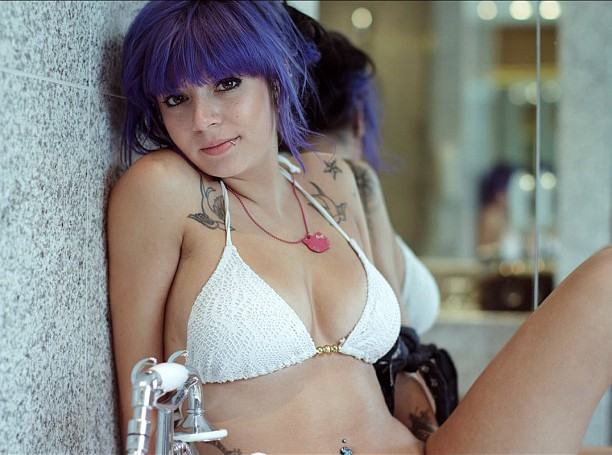
Katherine Suicide, from her featured set Nautical Dreams

- SuicideGirls: The First Tour was self-produced and released on August 30, 2005, by Epitaph Records. It chronicles the lives of 10 performers on the first North American Burlesque Tour.
- SuicideGirls: Italian Villa was released on October 24, 2006. It features interviews and photo shoots of 15 European Suicide Girls.
- The horror film Suicide Girls Must Die!, directed by Sawa Suicide, was released in certain theatres on March 12, 2010. It was released as video on demand on July 16, 2010.
- SuicideGirls: Guide to Living was released on DVD and Blu-ray on March 16, 2010, and features Suicide Girls putting erotic twists on otherwise everyday activities.
- SuicideGirls: UK Holiday was released in September 2012 and is also available on both DVD and Blu-ray. It documents a weeklong stay in a converted mill in the UK countryside, featuring 30 Suicide Girls from across the globe.
- SuicideGirls: Retrospective was released on November 3, 2012, and is a collection of videos from the previous decade.
- SuicideGirls: Relaunch is the latest offering, released August 8, 2015. It chronicles the recent relaunch of the website, documenting Missy and her team's day-to-day operations of SuicideGirls.

SuicideGirls: The First Tour, SuicideGirls: Italian Villa and SuicideGirls: Relaunch all air on the US cable network Showtime in regular rotations, since the years of their respective release dates.

=== Games ===
In May 2013, SuicideGirls came to an agreement with Akaneiro: Demon Hunters game developer Spicy Horse to use likenesses of their models in a freemium browser, BigHead BASH. Players can purchase premium content for 220 in-game tokens each, to unlock 5 characters in total. The models featured are Bob, Gogo, Milloux, Venom and Radeo.

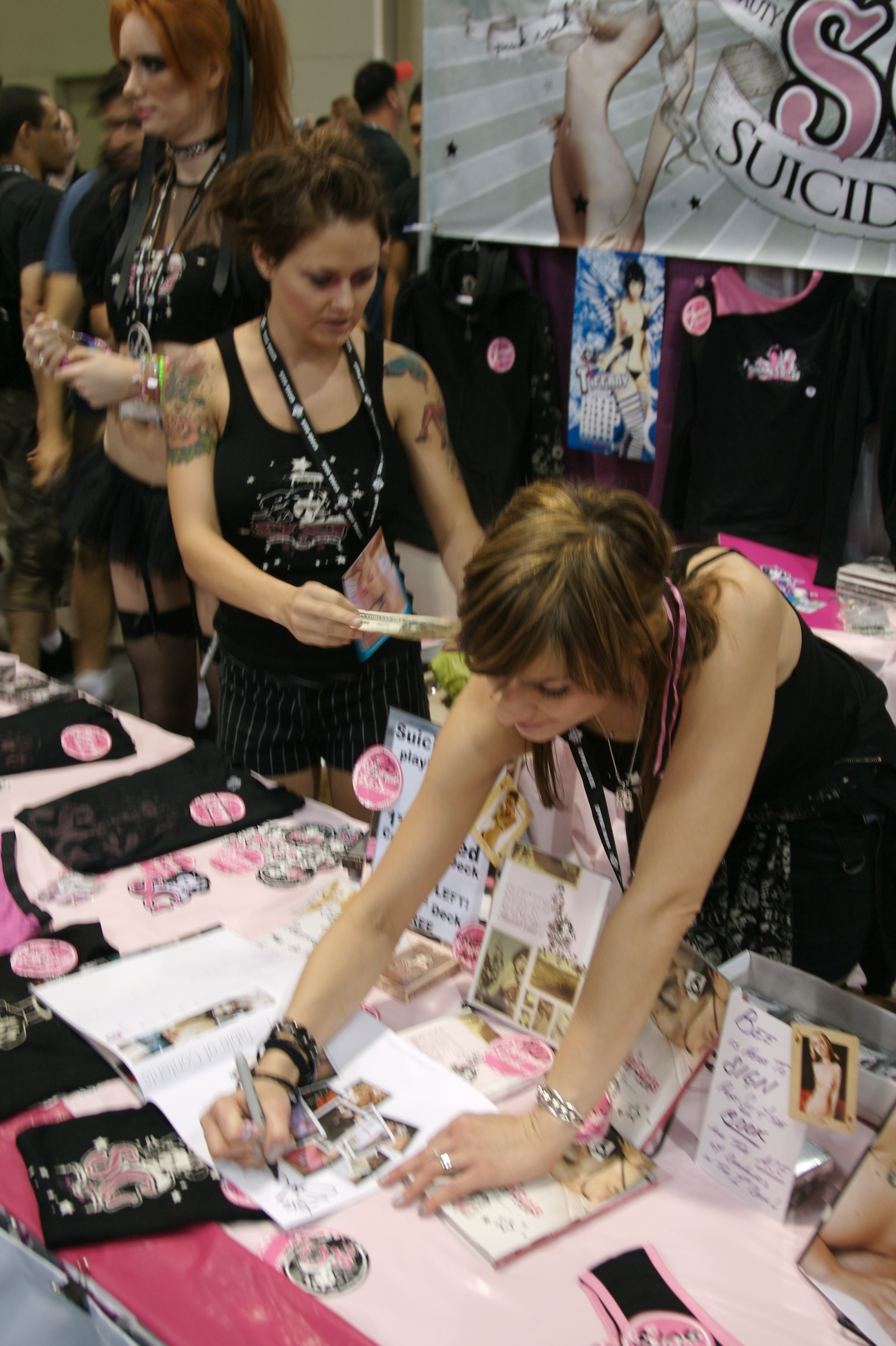
Sam Doumit signing a SuicideGirls magazine at San Diego Comic-Con, 2007

=== Books ===
SuicideGirls have published four books since 2004, all featuring a variety of photos from the website and interviews with Suicide Girls.

- SuicideGirls (2004, Feral House)
- SuicideGirls: Beauty Redefined (2008, Ammo Books)
- SuicideGirls: Hard Girls, Soft Light (2013, Ammo Books)
- SuicideGirls: Geekology (2014, Ammo Books)

=== Comic books ===
SuicideGirls were featured in Hack/Slash: Annual Vol. 1 in 2008, released by Devil's Due Publishing.

A SuicideGirls comic book miniseries was released in 2011 by IDW Publishing, containing four issues. The comic books feature pin-up drawings of actual SuicideGirls by artist Cameron Stewart, as well as a historical story by Steve Niles. Shortly after, a German edition of the combined miniseries was released.

=== Magazines ===
SuicideGirls has published three issues of its magazine, otherwise known as the "periodical art book" or "pin-up anthology". Issues 1 and 2 were self-published in 2007 and the third issue was released in 2014 by Ammo Books.

=== Music videos ===
The music video for Louis XIV's 2005 release "Paper Doll" was released exclusively on the SuicideGirls website. The video, featuring models Claudia, Cricket, and Xtine trying on different outfits in a dressing room, was directed by Eon McKai.

In 2010, Belle and Sebastian included a song titled "Suicide Girl", about a photographer and a friend who wishes to audition for the site, on a limited release of Write About Love (later rereleased on The Third Eye Centre), and SuicideGirls produced a music video to the track. Stuart Murdoch estimated that it was Belle & Sebastian's most-watched music video, saying that "the girls take their clothes off, so that probably has something to do with it."

=== Live events ===
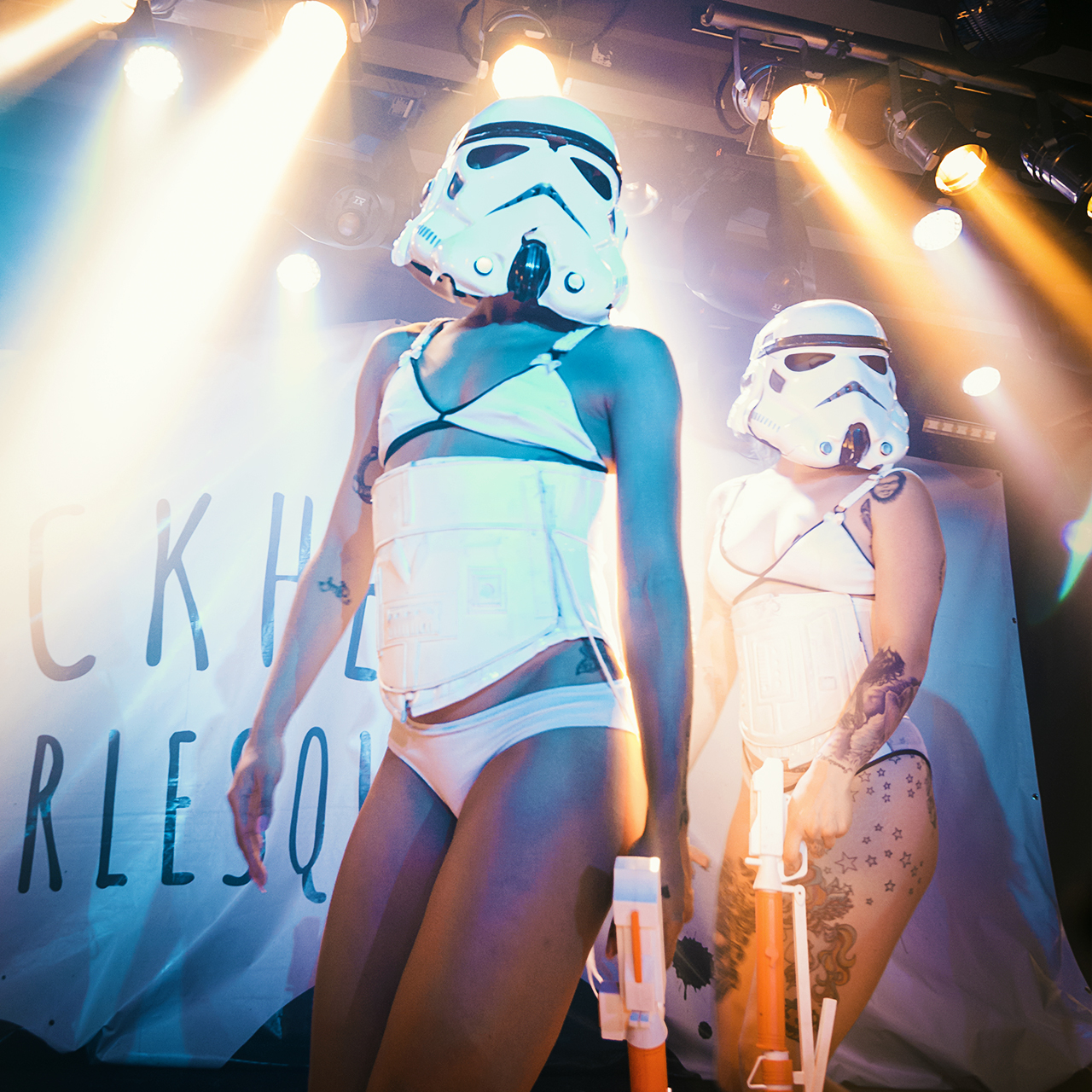
Suicide Girls Blackheart Burlesque dancers performing the Star Wars number

==== Blackheart Burlesque ====
The SuicideGirls Blackheart Burlesque group first toured in 2003 and opened for Guns N' Roses and Courtney Love, before the tour was suspended for nearly a decade. The show returned in 2013 and toured across the US, Canada and Australia, selling out numerous shows in each country. The show also visited the UK and Chile. Its high-energy mix of classic and new burlesque dancing was choreographed by Manwe Sauls-Addison.

The Blackheart Burlesque hosts a show of cult-classic numbers including performances based on Star Wars and The Rocky Horror Picture Show and pop culture references like Game of Thrones and Fifty Shades of Grey. As of 2016, the show is hosted by Sunny Suicide and Katherine Suicide and features a changing lineup of dancers. The shows have an element of audience participation and guests are encouraged to take photos of the performers and share them on social media.

==== Ballroom Blitz ====
The SuicideGirls Ballroom Blitz is a monthly rock and metal club night in the UK, taking place at Camden's Electric Ballroom. It boasts various stage performances including fire performance, pole dancing and classic burlesque, alongside cage dancing and rock, metal and alternative music. Performances come from UK Suicide Girls and Suicide Girl Hopefuls, guest DJs and guest acts from dance and fire performance groups.

== Controversies ==
=== Censorship ===
In 2005, a number of the paid models were reported to have resigned from the site or had their memberships revoked in connection with allegations of censorship and mistreatment of the models by the site's owners. Many members reported that their journals and message board posts were removed because of bullying other members. This practice of deleting either objectionable content, disagreeable content, or membership altogether is called "zotting" by SuicideGirls staffers and is implemented by the site's owners when members slander or abuse other members.

=== Exclusivity agreement and lawsuits ===
A primary issue in the past has been SuicideGirls' modeling contract, which prevented its models (including past models, for a time) from working for competing sites or agencies (specifically those dealing in nude photography or erotica). In response, SuicideGirls stated that only models "who have chosen to be involved in special projects" signed an exclusivity agreement in addition to their standard modeling contract barring them from working with direct competitors for a certain amount of time. SG replaced the contract with a model release in 2006. Many models have received mainstream modeling jobs from the exposure gained through SuicideGirls.

Many of the models involved in the 2005 dispute were later involved with now defunct competing sites GodsGirls and Deviant Nation. GodsGirls was sued by SuicideGirls for hiring models who were allegedly still under contract with SuicideGirls and for allegedly violating SuicideGirls trademarks. Several former models were also threatened with legal action. In November 2006, SuicideGirls fired one of its main photographers, Philip Warner (aka Lithium Picnic), for acting as the primary photographer for the website of former SuicideGirl Apnea. The termination was followed in February 2007 by a lawsuit by SuicideGirls against Warner. According to a press release by Warner and Apnea, as of February 2007, none of SuicideGirls LLC's lawsuits or threatened actions against former models or competing sites resulted in victory for the plaintiff, but the legal expenses in the lawsuits had been costly and time-consuming for the defendants. In June 2008, Lithium Picnic and Apnea issued a press release stating, "We all sat down together and worked out an agreement that is really fair to everyone. [...] We want to make it clear that we 100% have no hostilities towards SuicideGirls in any way anymore, we all came to a really fair agreement over this dispute, and there were no bad people here, just mistakes and misunderstandings."

=== Reselling photo sets of models to hardcore and pirate sites ===
In 2006, models discovered that SuicideGirls appeared to have begun reselling SG sets to sites models viewed as hardcore or pirate or at least not what they thought they were agreeing to.

=== Criticism by models ===
In a 2005 article, The Boston Phoenix reported on former models' dissatisfaction with company practices. Models interviewed called SuicideGirls president Sean Suhl "verbally abusive" and an "active misogynist", and the site a "slap in the face to feminism".

Other allegations surrounding the SuicideGirls' administration have appeared in a number of publications, including New York Press and Wired magazine.

According to statistics released by the website, in July 2005 one model left, followed by 11 in August, 25 in September, and 11 in October. According to former models interviewed in a feature piece by Silicon Valley's magazine Metro Active, this was, in their opinion, due to the general homogenization of the site, "a process that alternative subcultures are unfortunately used to".

=== Job loss ===
Olivia Black was fired from the crew of Las Vegas's Gold & Silver Pawn Shop, and thus the History Channel TV series Pawn Stars on December 19, 2012, when her previous work as a Suicide Girl was revealed.

=== Richard Prince ===
In 2015, American artist Richard Prince took images from the SuicideGirls' Instagram, printed them on canvas, and added remarks into comment threads. The works were displayed at the Frieze Art Fair and one image sold for $90,000. In response, the SuicideGirls sold prints of the images for $90 apiece with the proceeds going to charity.
