= Jason Hill (singer) =

American musician

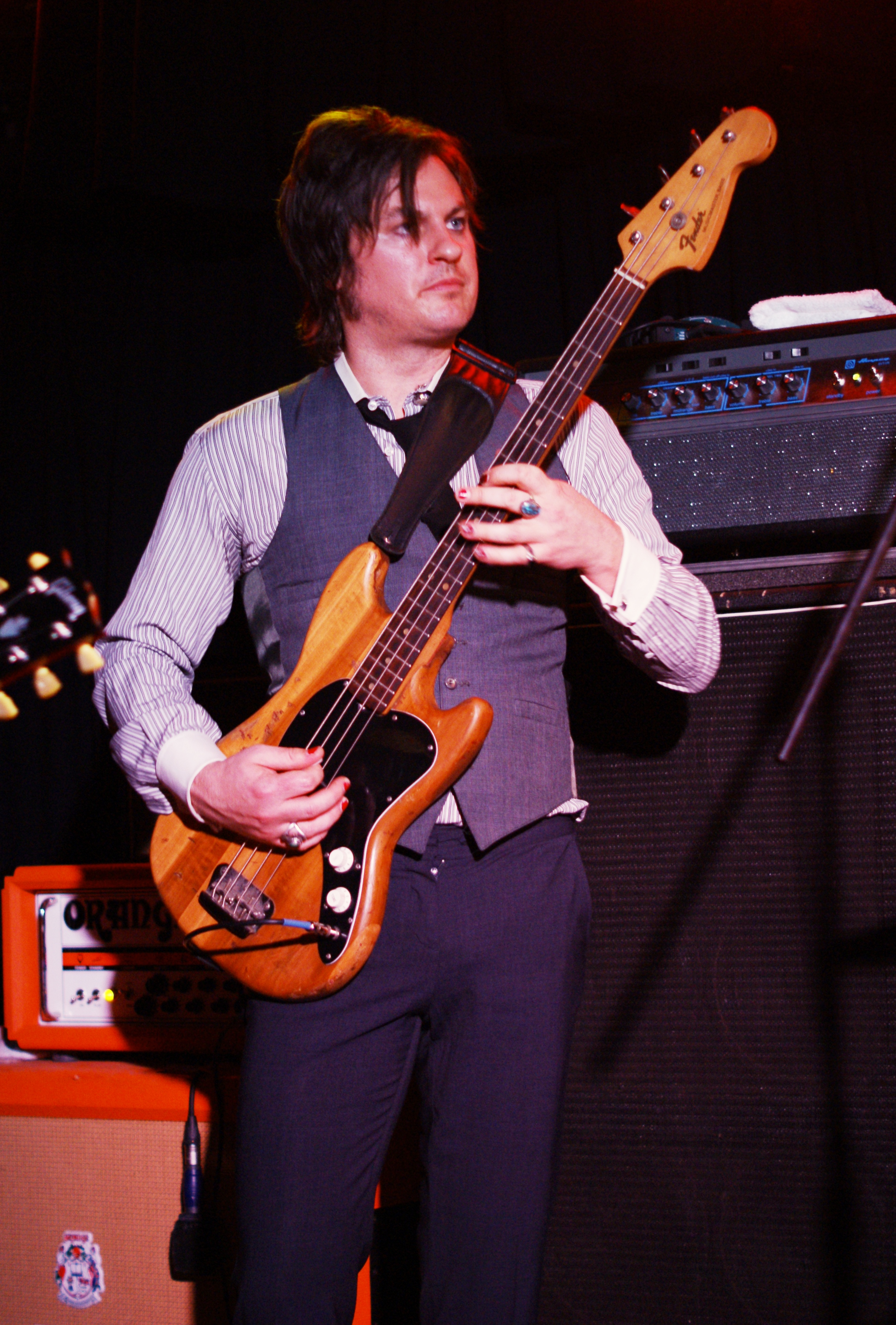
- Hill performing with New York Dolls in 2011

Background information
- Also known as: Louis XIV, Vicky Cryer, Giraffe
- Born: Jason Staehler Hill
- Genres: Rock, Alternative Rock, Indie Rock
- Occupations: Film score composer, producer, songwriter, musician, mixer, director
- Years active: 1990 – present
- Labels: Department of Recording and Power, Atlantic Records, Pineapple Recording Group, Sony ATV, Universal, Fancy Animal Records

Jason Staehler Hill is an American film score composer, record producer, songwriter, mixer, inventor and multi-instrumentalist. He is known for inventing his own musical instruments and for playing cello, guitar, pianos, bass, drums and synthesizers.

== Career ==
In 2014, Hill began his work in film with director David Fincher on the critically acclaimed motion picture Gone Girl. He was tasked to produce a new film version of the Charles Aznavour 1974 French classic She which featured a Hill penned orchestral and choral arrangement along with Richard Butler (The Psychedelic Furs) on vocals. This version was used as the teaser and trailer for the film. He was then asked to score Fincher's HBO series Videosyncrazy and his Emmy nominated Netflix series Mindhunter. Hill is also the original music composer 2023's Magazine Dreams, Apple TV's Extrapolations and City on Fire, Netflix's FYRE: The Greatest Party That Never Happened, Showtime's Couples Therapy, Netflix's 5-part mini-series The Confession Killer as well as Netflix's hit series This Is a Robbery. In 2022 Hill composed the music for director David Fincher’s Voir along with Emmy winning Netflix series Love, Death and Robots. The episode called "Bad Travelling" was directed by Fincher and is a 20-minute animated film.

Hill is also the lead singer and guitarist for the band Louis XIV. He has produced records, or otherwise worked with, such artists as The Killers, David Bowie, Jet, Sky Ferreira, New York Dolls, Brandon Flowers, Ariel Pink, Wolfmother, The Virgins, Robbie Williams, Macy Gray, Convoy, Nick Littlemore and Luke Steele (Empire of the Sun), among many others and has sold tens of millions of records to date collectively.

In 2011-2012 Hill produced, cowrote and performed on the New York Dolls' final album, Dancing Backward in High Heels. He also joined the New York Dolls as bass player for two tours in Europe while producing their album as well as a performance in New York City at the Bowery Ballroom, documented in the live video release New York Dolls at the Bowery.

In 2006 David Bowie personally asked Hill and Louis XIV to share the stage with him for his final live performance before Bowie’s death, at an AIDS in Africa Charity event called the BLACK BALL in New York City.
