= GoDigital Media Group =

Media company in Los Angeles, USA

- Company type: Private
- Industry: Entertainment; Digital Media Technologies
- Founded: Santa Monica, California (2005)
- Founders: Jason Peterson; Logan Mulvey; Dave Lindsay
- Key people: Jason Peterson; Barry Daffurn; Manfred Van Ursel; Hunter Paletsas
- Number of employees: 1250+
- Subsidiaries: AdShare; Cinq Music; ContentBridge; GoDigital (2008–2014); Media Aggregators; Latido Networks; mitu'; Sound Royalties; YogaWorks
- Website: www.godigitalmg.com
- Footnotes / references 4712 Admiralty Way, Marina Del Rey, Ca 90292 United States

GoDigital Media Group (GDMG) is a diversified multi-national conglomerate founded in 2006 by Jason Peterson and headquartered in Los Angeles. GDMG focuses on intellectual property rights management through divisions in music, video networks, and brands (commerce).

== Background ==
=== Early history ===
GoDigital Media Group was founded in 2006 by CEO and Chairman Jason Peterson. It started out focused on licensing music rights, before expanding into other areas. In 2008, it created a movie distribution subsidiary called GoDigital. Two years later, it created supply chain software company, ContentBridge. The video business expanded in January 2012, when it acquired video-on-demand business Might Entertainment, adding 700 movie titles to its licensing catalogue. One of GDMG's early projects was for the song Despacito, which led to referrals from other indie artists publishing content on YouTube.

In 2012, the company's music distribution business was renamed Cinq Music. Over time, Cinq also became a music label, creator, and rights management firm. That year, venture capital firm Preferred Ventures purchased a majority interest in the GoDigital subsidiary, for an undisclosed amount. Preferred Ventures then merged GoDigital with Variance Films in January 2014, forming a movie distribution business called Amplify. In 2015, the GoDigital subsidiary acquired independent film-maker Distribber. In 2016, GDMG's AdShare subsidiary acquired Primo Media, a network of YouTube channels for Latin music that also markets music talent to YouTube content creators.

In 2017, GDMG created Latido Music as an ad-supported Latin music TV channel. Initially, GDMG's business was heavily focused on Latin music. By 2018, it had 50-million listeners monthly, most of whom were from Latin American countries. In 2017, it invested $20 million into its Cinq subsidiary to expand to other genres. Its first major non-Latin project was in 2018, when the Cinq subsidiary recorded and distributed an album for Janet Jackson. It also purchased Warner Music Group's music rights in songs from rapper T.I., using half of $20 million in funding provided by the parent company GDMG. At the time, it was GDMG's largest acquisition. GDMG invested another $40 million into Cinq to acquire additional licensing rights in 2019. That investment was subsequently used to purchased the Beluga Heights Record Label including the right to songs by Sean Kingston and Jason Derulo. Latido Music acquired competing latin music business Mitú in February 2020, which was later merged with NGL Collective.

=== Recent history ===
During the COVID-19 pandemic, GoDigital Media Group shut down its headquarters in Los Angeles, California and transitioned to a remote workforce. It acquired eight businesses from 2020 - 2023. In 2021, GoDigital partnered with MEP Capital Management to purchase YogaWorks, in a Chapter 11 bankruptcy auction, for $9.6 million. YogaWorks had closed its physical Yoga studios due to the COVID-19 pandemic. GDMG converted it into an online subscription service. In 2023, YogaWorks introduced a fitness program intended for users with breast cancer in partnerships with celebrity Samantha Harris. GDMG also acquired Sound Royalties, which provides advances to artists in exchange for royalties in their music.

In 2022, GDMG invested another $100 million into its Cinq Music subsidiary. That same year, it acquired retailers Eastern Mountain Sports (EMS) and Bob's Stores from U.K.-based Frasers Group for $70 million. EMS and Bob's Stores had physical stores, whereas GDMG had historically focused on IP rights management, content, and services. Under its new owner, Eastern Mountain Sports made a series of ads making fun of its prior financial troubles and bankruptcy. In June 2023, GoDigital said it would be bidding on acquiring Vice, which was in bankruptcy. However, Vice selected a competing bid from Fortress Investment Group and was ultimately sold to that company.

== Subsidiaries ==
GoDigital Media Group's subsidiaries include:

- GoDigital gets a majority of its revenues from purchasing and licensing digital content. It also facilitates distribution deals with streaming services like Netflix or Hulu, on behalf of content creators. It develops and markets software that distributes digital multimedia content, tracks where it's been used, and translates the content for international markets.
- Cinq Music Group is a music rights, distribution, and label business focused on Latin and indie music. As of 2022, it licenses about 47,000 recordings.
- AdShare is a digital rights business that finds copyrighted audio content being used in third-party YouTube videos without permission.
- Sound Royalties provides financing to artists in exchange for royalties.

Networks:

- Latido Music creates multimedia content targeting millennial and Gen Z audiences.
- NGLmitú creates digital content intended for the Latino demographic. For example, it creates stories, programs, and documentaries on food and lifestyle topics, as well as branded content.
- YogaWorks is an online yoga service.

Commerce:

- GoDigital Brands is the subsidiary that manages GoDigital's commerce brands.
- ContentBridge is a supply chain software company.
