= Counterfeiters (2017 film) =

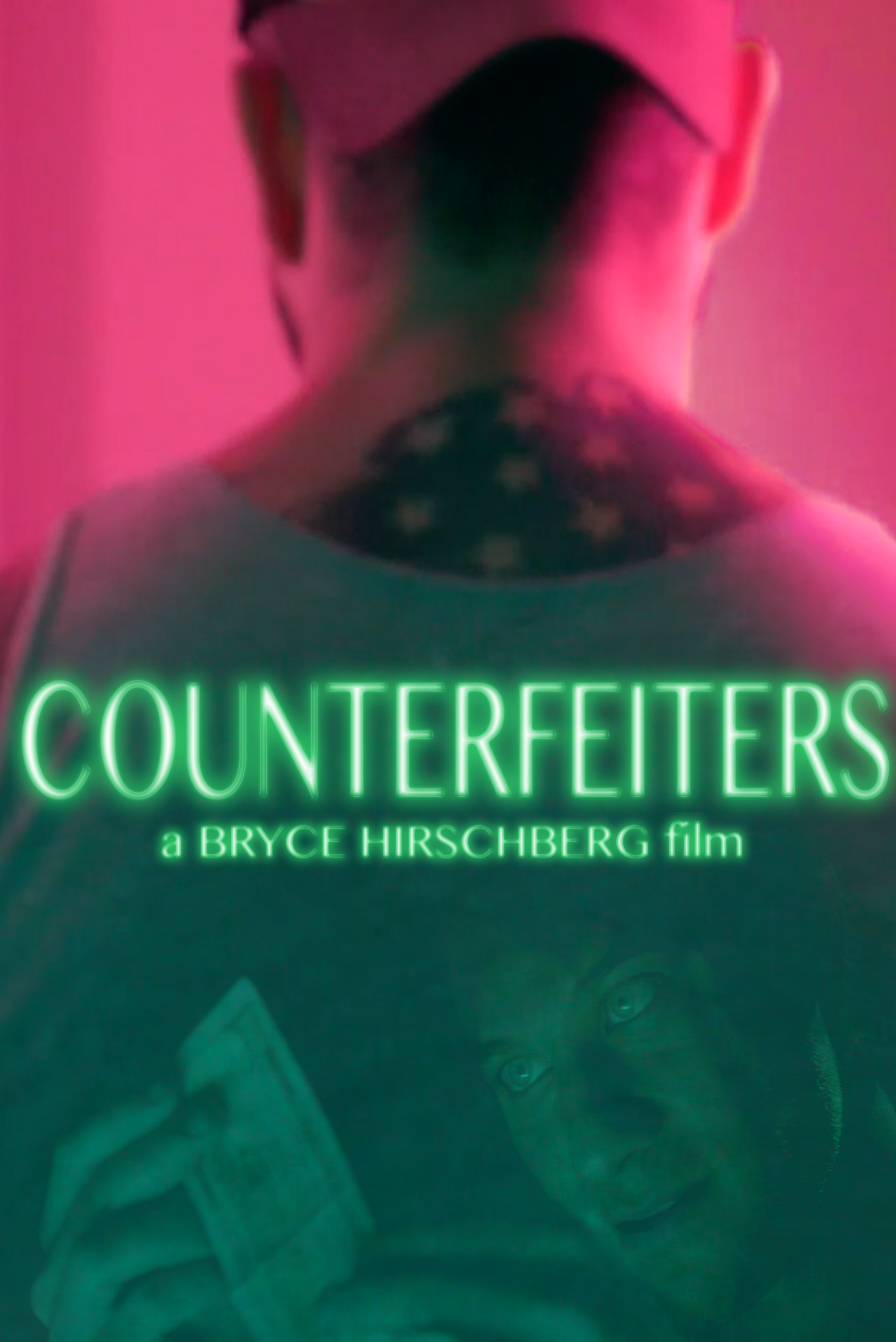
- Counterfeiters iTunes poster
- Directed by: Bryce Hirschberg
- Written by: Bryce Hirschberg
- Starring: Bryce Hirschberg; Taylor Lockwood; Robert McEveety
- Cinematography: David Klassen
- Edited by: Bryce Hirschberg
- Music by: JT Nebeker
- Distributed by: GoDigital; Distribber
- Release dates: September 8, 2017 (Wales International Film Festival); June 15, 2018 (Theatrical)
- Running time: 73 minutes
- Country: United States
- Language: English

Counterfeiters is a 2017 American action film, directed, produced, written by, and starring Bryce Hirschberg. Counterfeiters (based on his short film by the same name), tells the story of a young man, Bridger, who creates a "do-it-yourself" method of counterfeiting money to save his dying mother. It is notable for being filmed almost entirely on a boat in Marina del Rey, California on a shoe-string budget.

== Cast ==
- Bryce Hirschberg as Bridger
- Robert McEveety as Rob
- Taylor Lookwood as Preston
- Noel Castellanos as Jose
- Shawn Rolph as Jimmy
- Bridget Avildsen as Genise
- Nick Huebner as Alvin
- Peyton Pritchard as Amber

Julie Simone as Mom

== Release ==
The film was completed in July 2017 and had its world premiere at the Action On Film International Film Festival in Las Vegas, Nevada at the Brenden Theatre in the Palms Casino Resort. It has since been screened at several major film festivals around the world including; the Wolves Independent International Film Festival (Lithuania), Miami Independent Film Festival (United States), Wales International Film Festival (United Kingdom), Marina del Rey Film Festival (United States), Oniros Film Awards (Italy), and Filmchella (United States).

The film was released on iTunes and Amazon Prime by GoDigital on February 6, 2018, before being released theatrically in a limited release on June 15, 2018.

== Reception ==
Counterfeiters received positive reviews from critics. On review aggregator Rotten Tomatoes, the film holds an approval rating of 67% based on 6 reviews. Alex Arabian of Film Inquiry praised Hirschberg, "This is the work of a talented filmmaker just beginning his creative endeavors in the industry. By combining realism with some of his favorite cinematic influences, maximizing an impressively minimal budget, and embracing the art of collaboration, Hirschberg makes a commendable film debut with Counterfeiters." Katie Walsh of the Los Angeles Times commented, "...the ambition and moments of inspired style are [to] be lauded."

== Awards ==
Award	Category	Recipient	Result
Wolves Independent International Film Awards	Best Narrative Feature	Counterfeiters	Won
Marina del Rey Film Festival	Audience Award Best Feature	Counterfeiters	Won
Action on Film International Film Festival	Best Ensemble Cast – Feature	Counterfeiters	Nominated
Action on Film International Film Festival	Best Art Direction – Feature	Counterfeiters	Nominated
Action on Film International Film Festival	Best Drama – Feature	Counterfeiters	Nominated
Filmchella	Gorilla Award	Counterfeiters	Won
Oniros Film Awards	Best Actor	Bryce Hirschberg	Won
Frostbite International Film Festival	Best Feature Film	Counterfeiters	Won
Film Fest Los Angeles	Best Feature Film	Counterfeiters	Won
Film Fest Los Angeles	Best Actor	Bryce Hirschberg	Won
Film Fest Los Angeles	Best Screenplay	Counterfeiters	Won
Film Fest Los Angeles	Best Director	Bryce Hirschberg	Won
Film Fest Los Angeles	Best Editor	Bryce Hirschberg	Won
