= Amplify (distributor) =

American independent film distributor

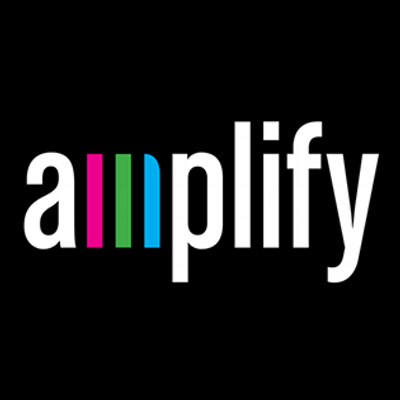
- Company type: Private
- Industry: Motion picture
- Founded: 2014
- Headquarters: New York City, New York, United States
- Products: Film distribution

Amplify is an American independent film distributor founded in 2014. The company is the result of a merger between distributors GoDigital and Variance Films.

Amplify releases seven to ten films per year across major platforms. Variance Films and GoDigital will continue to operate as divisions of Amplify, merging digital rights and distribution automation processing under GoDigital's corporate sister, ContentBridge.

In 2015, GoDigital acquired the self-distribution platform Distribber.

== Selected films ==
Year	Title	Director	Notes
2014	The Zero Theorem	Terry Gilliam	Premiered at the 70th Venice International Film Festival.
2014	God Help the Girl	Stuart Murdoch	Special Jury Prize (Ensemble) - 2014 Sundance Film Festival
2014	The Better Angels	A.J. Edwards	Premiered at the 2014 Sundance Film Festival. Produced by Terrence Malick.
2015	Little Accidents	Sara Colangelo	Premiered at the 2014 Sundance Film Festival.
2015	Kumiko, the Treasure Hunter	David Zellner	Winner - Special Jury Prize (Score – The Octopus Project) - 2014 Sundance Film Festival
2015	Champs	Bert Marcus	Premiered at the 2014 Tribeca Film Festival.
2015	Felt	Jason Banker	Premiered at the 2014 Fantastic Fest.
2016	Lazer Team	Matt Hullum	Premiered at the 2015 Fantastic Fest
2016	They're Watching	Jay Lender, Micah Wright	
