= EbLens =

Retail company

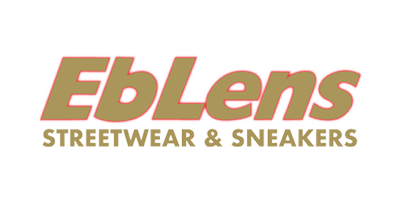
- EbLens logo
- Company type: Streetwear and clothing store
- Industry: Retail
- Founded: 1949; 77 years ago, New Britain, Connecticut
- Defunct: July 2023
- Fate: Liquidation
- Headquarters: Torrington, Connecticut, U.S.
- Number of locations: 0 (2023)
- Products: Shoes, clothing
- Owner: Independent (1949-2012); KarpReilly, LLC (2012-2017); Fidus Investment Corp. (2017-2023); Prospect Hill Growth Partners (2017-2023)

EbLens (formerly known as Workingman's, and sometimes referred to as EbLens Clothing and Footwear or Eblens) was an American chain specializing in streetwear and clothing products. The company had retail operations in Connecticut, Massachusetts, Rhode Island, New York, and New Jersey, with the vast majority of these locations being located in malls, shopping centers, or suburban areas. In June 2023, EbLens announced it would close all 51 of its stores and liquidate its assets.

== History ==
Founders and friends Ebner 'Eb' Glooskin and Leonard 'Len' Seaman, founded the EbLens saga by opening a small Workingman's store located in New Britain, Connecticut, which sold army surplus goods. In February 1949, Glooskin and Seaman closed their Workingman's store and opened the first EbLens store, also located in New Britain, Connecticut, which instead of selling army surplus goods, EbLens sold clothing and footwear. It was an instant success and attracted a lot of customers, and Glooskin and Seaman responded to this success by rapidly expanding their retail footprint into neighborhoods and rural areas in order to become closer to its customers than its major competitors at the time, which included Thom McAn, Montgomery Ward, JCPenney, Sears, and Florsheim Shoes.

EbLens continued to succeed and expand, by expanding its selection by selling jeans, work boots, and sneakers, as more people began to wear those kinds of products. EbLens entered the urban lifestyle in the 1990s as it saw the potential to increase sales even further by doing this, and in effort to compete with other clothing chains such as Old Navy, Gap, Aeropostale, PacSun, and Banana Republic, and opened its first store specifically focused on urban fashion in Brockton, Massachusetts in 2004, near Brockton High School.

In 2012, after surviving the 2008 financial crisis, EbLens was sold to private investment firm KarpReilly, LLC, which has invested in other companies such as Dollar Tree, Hibbett Sports, Charlotte Russe, and Ollie's Bargain Outlet. In 2017, KarpReilly sold EbLens to private equity firm Prospect Hill Growth Partners, and business development firm Fidus Investment Corporation.

On August 25, 2020, it was announced that Nike would be permanently terminating 9 wholesale accounts in shift to DTC, as Nike plans to open more physical stores over the next couple of years. EbLens was one of the nine wholesale accounts terminated, with the others being City Blue, VIM, Belk, Dillard's, Fred Meyer, Bob's Stores, Boscov's, and Zappos.

On June 12, 2023, it was announced that all remaining EbLens would be winding down via a general assignment. Its assets would be transferred to a newly formed company called EbLens ABC, who would liquidate the assets once stores were closed. The company blamed the COVID-19 pandemic, their wholesale account termination from Nike, and tough competition from other shoe store chains.
