= Cinq Music Group =

American record label

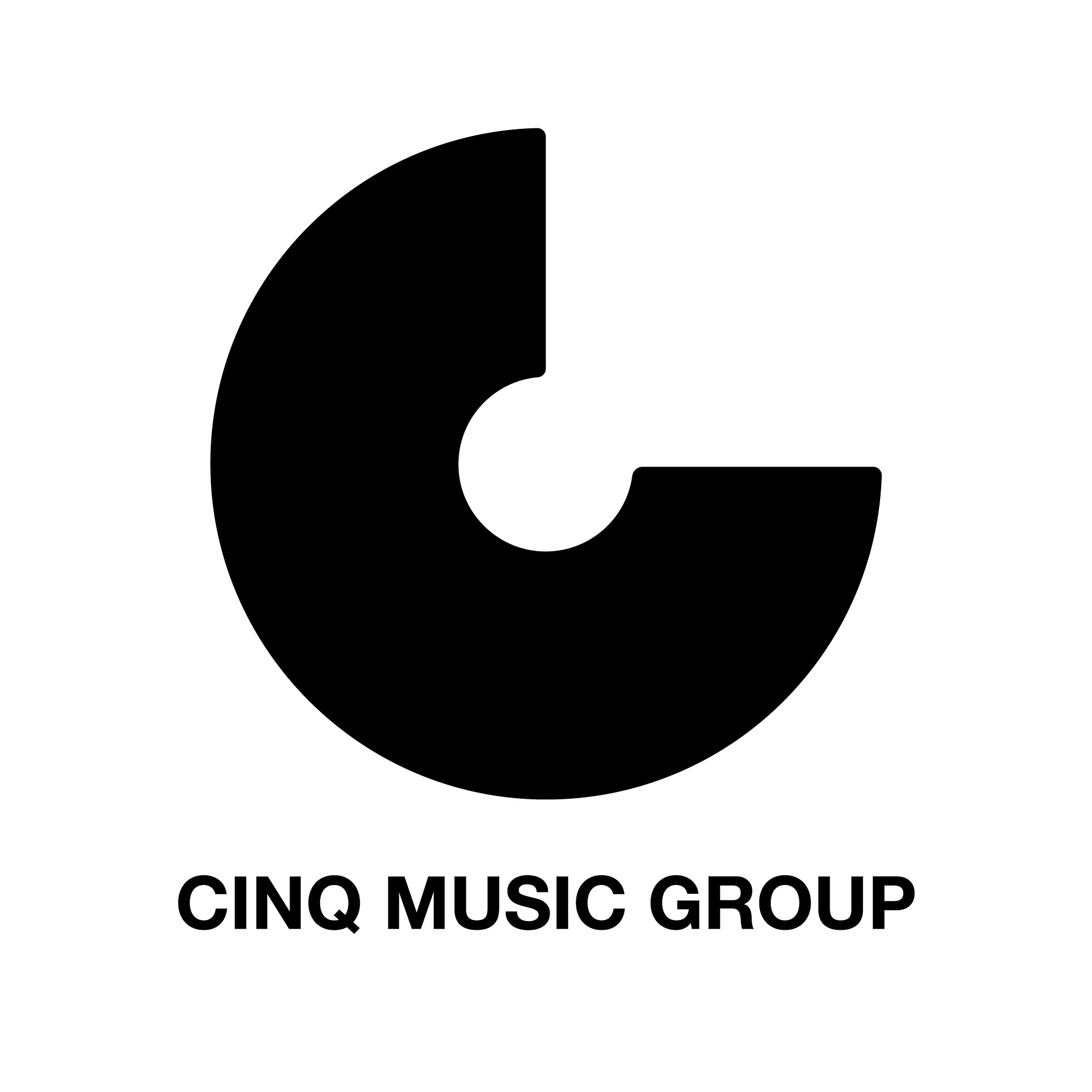
- Company type: Subsidiary
- Founded: 2012
- Headquarters: Los Angeles, California, {{{location_country}}}
- Area served: Global
- Owner: GoDigital Media Group
- Founders: Jason Peterson and Barry Daffurn
- Services: Music distribution, marketing, funding
- Website: cinqmusic.com
- Native clients on: Apple Music, iTunes, Spotify, Amazon, Google Play, Vevo

Cinq Music Group is a record label, distribution, and music publishing business. It is a private subsidiary of GoDigital Media Group headquartered in Los Angeles, California, United States. The company is divided into four divisions: recording, a record label, publishing, distribution, and catalog. As of 2022, it licenses approximately 47,000 recordings.

The GoDigital Media Group subsidiary was created in 2012 by Jason Peterson and Barry Daffurn. At the time, it was GoDigital Media Group's largest acquisition. In 2017, GoDigital Media Group invested $20 million into Cinq to expand to other genres. Cinq's first major non-Latin project was in 2018, when it recorded and distributed a single for Janet Jackson. It also spent half of the $20 million in funding to purchase the recordings catalog of the rapper T.I.

The parent company invested another $40 million into Cinq to acquire additional licensing rights in 2019. That investment was subsequently used to purchase the Beluga Heights Record Label, including the catalog of Jason Derulo. Over time, Cinq expanded from being a Latin music distributor to a music label, creator, and rights management firm for a wider range of genres.

GoDigital Media Group continued to invest in Cinq, funding $100 million in 2022 and $250 million in 2024, funding a series of acquisitions and acquiring catalog rights of the late producer Flow La Movie.
