= Bryce Hirschberg =

American film director (born 1990)

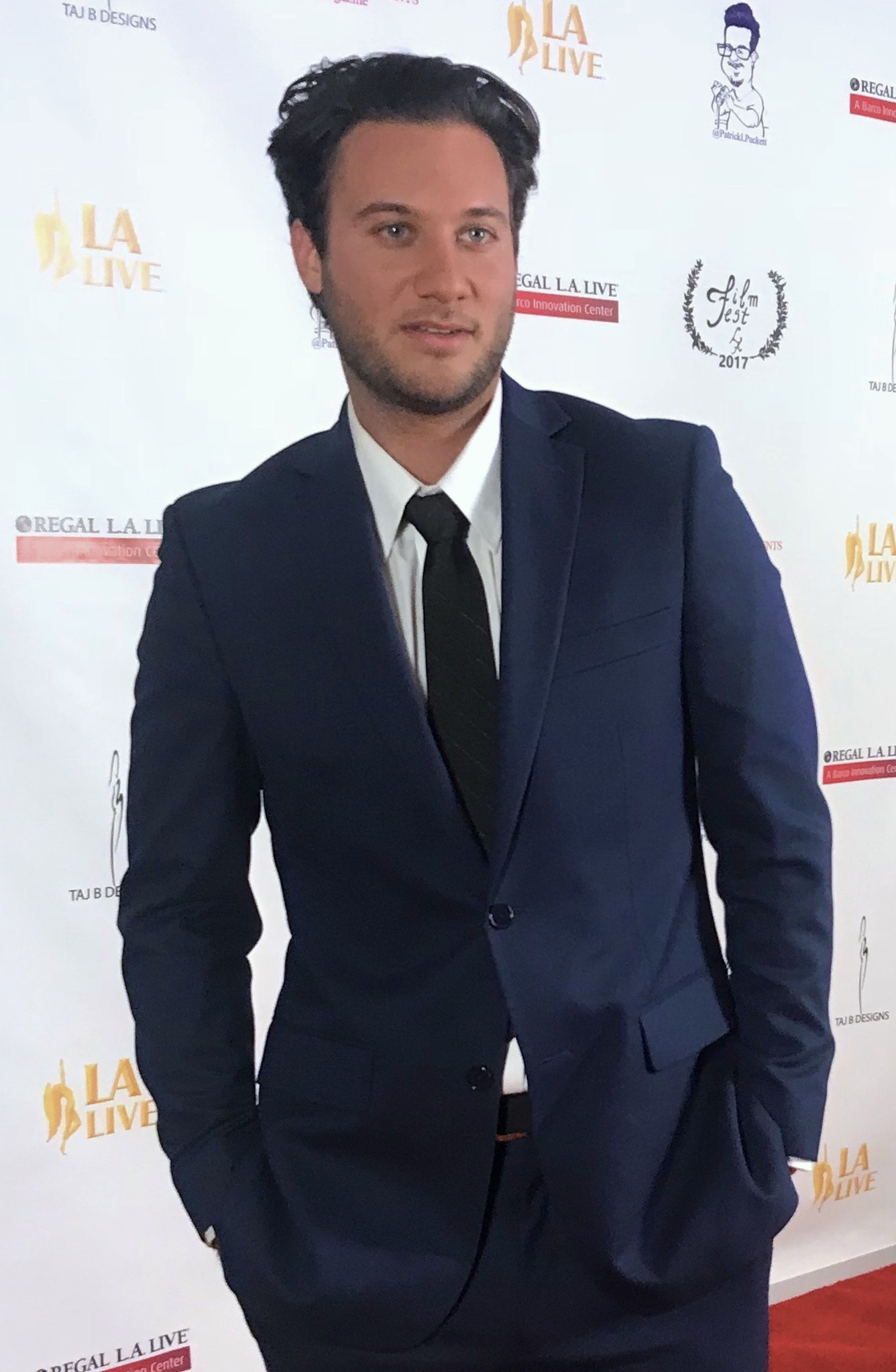
- Hirschberg at La Live premiere of Counterfeiters
- Born: Bryce David Hirschberg; May 24, 1990 (age 36); La Jolla, California, U.S.
- Education: Loyola Marymount University
- Occupations: Film director, screenwriter
- Years active: 2011–present
- Known for: Counterfeiters

Bryce David Hirschberg (born May 24, 1990) is an American film director, screenwriter, producer, actor, and musical artist.

In 2017, his first feature-length film, Counterfeiters, won multiple international awards including Best Feature Narrative at the Wolves Independent International Film Awards in Lithuania. He's best known for appearing on the Netflix original series, Too Hot to Handle, and now recording music independently under the artist name "Bryc."

== Career ==
While at LMU, Hirschberg directed two short films, both of which won or were nominated for various awards: Baer (2011), which won the Special Jury Prize at the California Film Awards, and Counterfeiters (2013), which won the "Best Picture" at LMU's Annual Film Outside the Frame Awards and was screened at multiple international festivals including the Short Film Corner at the Cannes Film Festival, Phoenix Film Festival, and Fine Cut: KCET's Festival of Student Film.

Hirschberg's first feature-length film, Counterfeiters (based on his short film by the same name), tells the story of a young man, Bridger, who creates a "do-it-yourself" method of counterfeiting money to save his dying mother.

Hirschberg was writer, director, producer, editor, sound designer, and lead actor of the film, which was completed in July 2017 and premiered at the Action On Film International Film Festival in Las Vegas, Nevada at the Brenden Theatre in the Palms Casino Resort. It was screened at several major film festivals around the world including; the Marina Del Rey Film Festival (US), Wolves Independent International Film Festival (Lithuania), Miami Independent Film Festival (US), Wales International Film Festival (UK), Oniros Film Awards (Italy), where Hirschberg was awarded "Best Actor", and Filmchella (US), where it was awarded the "Gorilla Award" for "the most innovative filmmaking; independent in spirit, often against all odds with no budget".

He also appeared on Netflix's original "Too Hot To Handle" in which contestants are chosen to stay in a luxury villa for a couple of weeks without any kissing or sex.

== Education and personal life ==
Hirschberg graduated from Loyola Marymount University in 2012, where he majored in Film Production and minored in Film Studies. He was awarded the Cosgrove Family Distinguished Visiting Artist Endowment scholarship that recognizes "outstanding students who show exceptional and unique promise for continued creative and academic excellence and achievement."

Hirschberg lives on his boat in Marina Del Rey, California (where most of the feature film Counterfeiters takes place).

In 2019, Hirschberg began a relationship with his Too Hot to Handle co-star Nicole O’Brien. The two parted ways in June 2020.

== Filmography ==
- Baer (short, 2011)
- Counterfeiters (short, 2013)
- Counterfeiters (2017) (director, writer, producer, editor, lead actor)
- Too Hot to Handle (2020)
- Ex on the Beach 5 (2022)
