= Lord of the Bling =

- Veronica Mars episode
- Episode no.: Season 1 Episode 13
- Directed by: Steve Gomer
- Written by: John Enbom
- Production code: 2T5712
- Original air date: February 8, 2005

Guest appearances
- Anthony Anderson as Percy "Bone" Hamilton; Amanda Seyfried as Lilly Kane; Jowharah Jones as Yolanda Hamilton; Jermaine Williams as Bryce Hamilton; Bruce Nozick as Samuel Bloom; Shari Headley as Vanessa Hamilton; Sam Sarpong as Darius "Dime Bag" Bagley; Harry Hamlin as Aaron Echolls

Episode chronology
← Previous "Clash of the Tritons"	Next → "Mars vs. Mars"
- Veronica Mars season 1

"Lord of the Bling" is the thirteenth episode of the first season of the American mystery television series Veronica Mars. Written by John Enbom and directed by Steve Gomer, the episode premiered on UPN on February 8, 2005, after nearly a one-month hiatus since the previous episode, "Clash of the Tritons".

The series depicts the adventures of Veronica Mars (Kristen Bell) as she deals with life as a high school student while moonlighting as a private detective. In this episode, Veronica investigates the mysterious disappearance of her old friend, Yolanda (Jowharah Jones) when the girl's father approaches Keith (Enrico Colantoni) for help.

== Synopsis ==
A man, Percy "Bone" Hamilton (Anthony Anderson), is relaxing by his pool. Soon, his son, Bryce (Jermaine Williams), approaches and says that Yolanda (Jowharah Jones), Bryce's sister and Bone's daughter, has disappeared. Later, Bone enters Mars Investigations and looks for Keith. Wallace (Percy Daggs III) tells Veronica that Bone is a criminal and gangsta rap record company owner. Veronica says that she used to be friends with Yolanda. Keith eventually decides to take up the case, and Bone has a list of people to whom Keith should talk because of rifts between Bone and them. Later, Veronica offers to gather information about Yolanda, which Keith accepts. In a flashback, Veronica helps Yolanda find her English class. Keith visits the first person on Bone's list, Sam Bloom (Bruce Nozick). Veronica talks to Yolanda's friend, Gabrielle (Monique Coleman), and she finds out that the two were at a club the night of her disappearance. Keith is going to investigate Marcel, the club bouncer who was another one of the enemies on Bone's list. Veronica is eventually allowed to come on the condition that she stays in the car. Keith talks to Marcel, who recommends that he talks to "Dime Bag" (Sam Sarpong), number two on the enemies list. However, they don't find Dime Bag there. Keith sneaks his way into Dime Bag's hotel room in disguise as a mechanic while Veronica waits outside.

While Keith is in the room, Dime Bag and his posse appear and demand a better room from the desk clerk. Veronica pretends to be a hotel worker so she can bug the new room. She and Keith then hear their conversation. Meanwhile, Logan (Jason Dohring) and Aaron (Harry Hamlin) get ready for Lynn's (Lisa Rinna) funeral and have a fight in front of the paparazzi. Veronica visits Yolanda's younger brother, who thinks that she has been kidnapped, not simply disappeared. In another flashback, Veronica sees Yolanda kissing Logan and tells Lilly (Amanda Seyfried) about it. Lilly says that they must stop being friends with her. Bone calls Dime Bag, and he says that he knows where Yolanda is. However, it is later revealed through the bug that they are not hiding Yolanda.

Veronica and Wallace find out that Sam Bloom has a son, Benjamin, who was with Yolanda at the club the night of her disappearance. When Logan sits in his room and plays video games during Lynn's funeral, Duncan talks to him, and Logan expresses his belief that his mother is not dead, but simply "escaped". Veronica calls Benjamin's roommate under a guise, and he says that Benjamin left alone for Las Vegas, which means that Sam was lying about his whereabouts. In another flashback, Veronica abandons Yolanda for Lilly. Bone comes to Keith with a ransom note for $500,000. However, the drop location is already specified and the area is under heavy surveillance. Bone believes that Dime Bag is the kidnapper.

During the drop, Bone places his pinkie ring inside of a plastic football and shoves it down the drain per the "kidnapper's" orders. However, Keith and Veronica find Bryce at the other end of the storm drain, as he intercepts the plastic football at the beach. He explains that he planned the whole thing to earn his father's respect, and that Yolanda wasn't kidnapped, but ran off to Vegas. Keith, Veronica, and Bryce talk to Bone and his wife. The three get Yolanda up on a Skype-like camera. She says that she has run off to marry Benjamin Bloom. Yolanda says that she won't come back until Bone's feud with Sam Bloom is over. Later, Veronica calls Yolanda again and apologizes to her for leaving her, and she accepts.

== Cultural references ==
A variety of cultural references are made in the episode:

- Bone compares his two children to Velvet Brown from National Velvet and Steve Urkel.
- Lynn Echolls left her suicide note on a BlackBerry.
- Logan uses the V sign when talking to his father.
- Logan uses the phrase, "My father thanks you. My mother thanks you. I thank you," a reference to a statement popularized by George M. Cohan.
- Logan also mentions ICM Partners, a talent and literary agency.
- The video game that Logan plays at his mother's funeral is Fable.

== Arc significance ==
- It was Yolanda Hamilton who kissed Logan, leading to Lilly and Logan's break-up before Lilly's murder.
- Logan asks Veronica for help in finding his mother.

== Music ==
The following music can be heard in the episode:

- "The Bomb" by The Pharcyde
- "The Girl Who Wouldn't Die" by Tsar
- "Saturday Night" by Ozomatli
- "Hey Ma" by Cam'ron

== Production ==
Although credited, Eli "Weevil" Navarro, portrayed by Francis Capra, does not appear in "Lord of the Bling". This episode also features the return of recurring character Lilly Kane (Amanda Seyfried), who appears in flashbacks in the episode after being absent since "The Girl Next Door". The episode's title is a reference to The Lord of the Rings and bling-bling, a slang term for jewelry in hip hop culture. As a joke, the last words spoken before the opening credits in "Lord of the Bling" are "We used to be friends…a long time ago," spoken by Veronica when Wallace asks her about Yolanda. These are the first words heard in the series' theme song, "We Used to Be Friends" by The Dandy Warhols.

== Reception ==
=== Ratings ===
In its original broadcast, "Lord of the Bling" received 2.97 million viewers, ranking 106th of 116 in the weekly rankings.

=== Reviews ===
The episode received mixed to positive reviews from television critics. Television Without Pity gave the episode a "B" grade. Price Peterson, writing for TV.com, gave the episode a mixed review. The reviewer wrote that he "did really like the flashbacks about how Veronica had kind of spurned [Yolanda] back in the day." However, he criticized the episode in general, stating that "the episode as a whole wasn't quite as compelling as some of the others."

Rowan Kaiser of The A.V. Club gave the episode a positive review. She stated that "[t]he case-of-the-week may have a 'ripped-from-the-headlines' feel, and that's usually considered a bad thing, but it actually works fairly well." She summarized the review by writing that "Lord of the Bling" was "another winning episode in what's rapidly becoming an impressive streak."
