= Variance Films =

Film distribution company

- Industry: Motion pictures
- Founded: June 2008
- Headquarters: New York City, New York, United States
- Website: www.variancefilms.com

Variance Films is a privately held film distribution company founded in 2008 that uses a model of self-distribution combined with select elements of traditional theatrical distribution to allow filmmakers to achieve theatrical releases for their films.

Variance Films does not require filmmakers to sign over any rights to their films, instead partnering with filmmakers to ensure their film gets the proper theatrical release, while allowing them to keep their DVD, video on demand, television, and international rights.

In 2014 it was announced that GoDigital and Variance Films would be merging and forming the distribution company Amplify. In 2019, Variance extracted itself from the arrangement and relaunched as a standalone company.

== Theatrical film distribution list ==
=== 2000s ===
2008

- Walking on Dead Fish (September 19)
- Smother (September 26)

2009

- Nursery University (April 24)
- White on Rice (September 11)
- Blind Date (September 25)
- Adventures of Power (October 9 NYC, October 16 LA)
- Passport to Love (October 9)
- Until The Light Takes Us (December 4)

=== 2010s ===
2010

- After The Cup: Sons of Sakhnin United (May 21)
- The Lottery (June 11)
- Spoken Word (July 23)
- Fool For Love (September 10)
- Strange Powers: Stephin Merritt and the Magnetic Fields (October 27)
- Guy and Madeline on a Park Bench (November 5)

2011

- Ip Man 2: Legend of the Grandmaster (January 28)
- Clash (Bẫy Rồng) (March 11)
- American: The Bill Hicks Story (April 8)
- Legend of the Fist: The Return of Chen Zhen (April 22)
- Battle of the Brides (Co Dau Dai Chien) (May 6)
- How To Live Forever (May 13)
- General Orders No. 9 (June 24)
- Littlerock (August 12)
- Amigo (August 19)
- Shaolin (September 9)
- The Weird World of Blowfly (September 16)
- 1911 (October 7)
- Elevate (October 21)
- Elite Squad: The Enemy Within (November 11)
- Addiction Incorporated (December 14)

2012

- Let the Bullets Fly (March 2)
- The Trouble With Bliss (March 23)
- Hit So Hard (April 13)
- The Perfect Family (May 4)
- Red Hook Summer (August 10)
- Head Games (September 21)
- 3, 2, 1... Frankie Go Boom (October 12)
- Tai Chi 0 (October 26)

2013

- Sound City (February 1)
- The End of Love (March 1st)
- Hunky Dory (March 22)
- An Oversimplification of Her Beauty (April 26)
- The History of Future Folk (May 31) Featuring Folk Band Future Folk
- Terms and Conditions May Apply (July 12)
- Drug War (July 26)
- American Made Movie (August 30)
- God Loves Uganda (October 11)
- Go For Sisters (November 8)

2014

- It Felt Like Love (May 21)
- The Retrieval (April 2)
- Elena (May 30)
- Citizen Koch (June 6)
- Test (June 6)
- Closed Curtain (July 9)
- Video Games: The Movie (July 15)

=== 2020s ===
2022

- RRR (2022)

2023

- Taylor Swift: The Eras Tour (sub-distribution for AMC Theaters) (2023)

2024

- Breathe (April 26)

2025

- Rosario (May 2)
- Baahubali: The Epic (Oct 31)

2027

- Family Movie (April 23)
