= I Know That Voice =

- Film poster
- Directed by: Lawrence Shapiro
- Written by: Lawrence Shapiro; Tommy Reid; Brandon Sonnier; John DiMaggio
- Produced by: John DiMaggio; Tommy Reid
- Narrated by: John DiMaggio
- Cinematography: Ryo Rex
- Edited by: Brandon Sonnier
- Music by: Transcenders
- Distributed by: GoDigital
- Release dates: November 6, 2013 (Grauman's Egyptian Theatre); January 7, 2014 (US)
- Running time: 95 minutes
- Country: United States
- Language: English

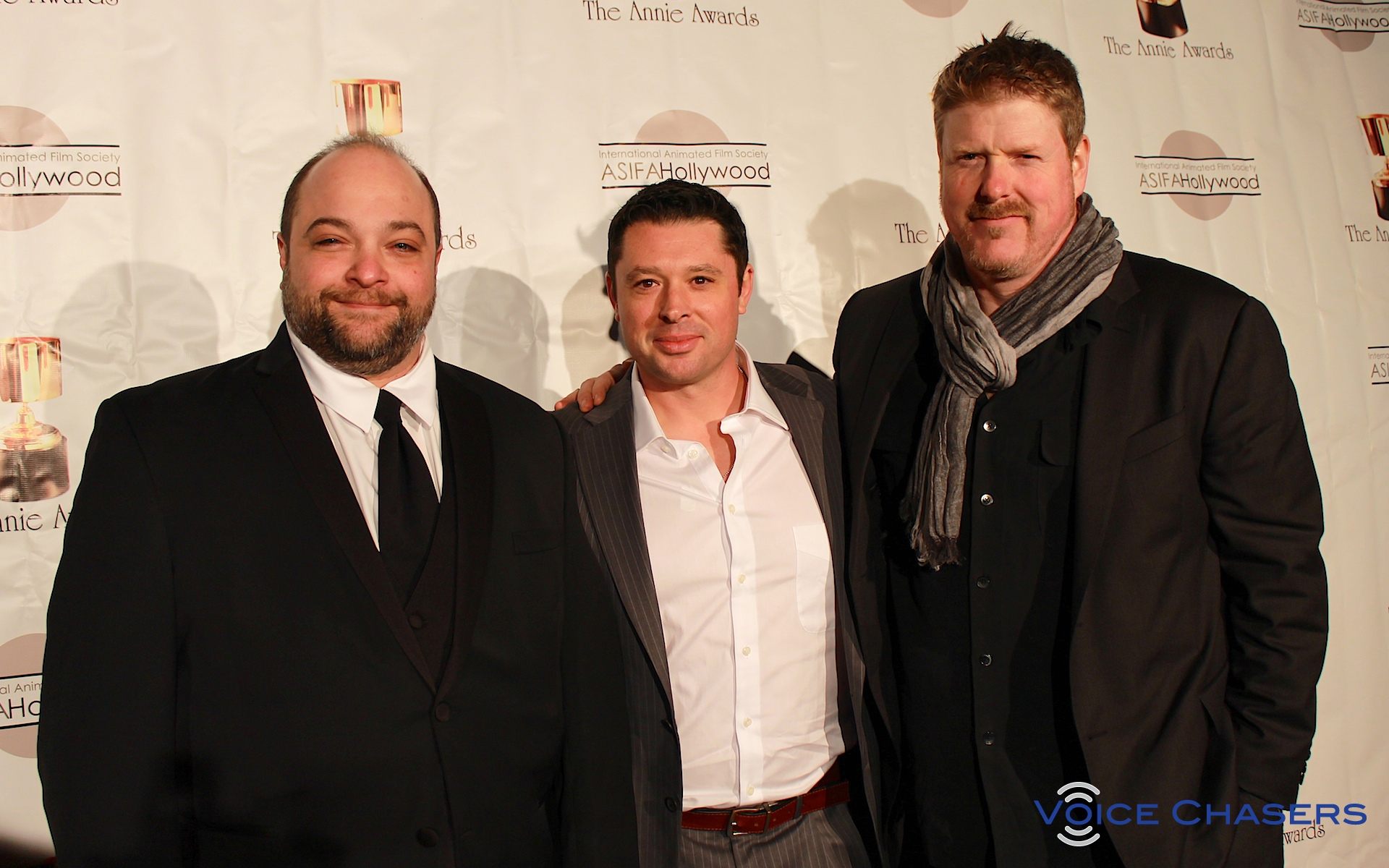
Lawrence Shapiro, director; Tommy Reid, producer; and John DiMaggio, producer and narrator at the 2014 Annie Awards

I Know That Voice is an American documentary film about English-language voice acting. It premiered on November 6, 2013, at Grauman's Egyptian Theatre. The documentary was narrated by John DiMaggio, the voice of Bender on Futurama and Jake on Adventure Time, and stars DiMaggio and many other voice actors, including Billy West, Tara Strong, Tom Kenny, Grey DeLisle, June Foray, Rob Paulsen, Rachael MacFarlane, Mark Hamill, Ed Asner, Robin Atkin Downes, and Pamela Adlon.

== Cast ==
The following voice actors, directors and staff were interviewed in the documentary:

- Charlie Adler
- Pamela Adlon
- Carlos Alazraqui
- Jack Angel
- Ed Asner
- Hank Azaria
- Diedrich Bader
- Dee Bradley Baker
- Eric Bauza
- Jeff Bennett
- Bob Bergen
- Gregg Berger
- Bob Birchard
- Noel Blanc
- Steve Blum
- Chris Borders
- Devon Bowman
- Justin Brinsfield
- Clancy Brown
- Corey Burton
- Nancy Cartwright
- David X. Cohen
- Kevin Connolly
- Kevin Conroy
- Matt Corey
- Jim Cummings
- E. G. Daily
- Grey DeLisle
- Debi Derryberry
- Jessica DiCicco
- John DiMaggio
- Robin Atkin Downes
- Mark Evanier
- Bill Farmer
- David Faustino
- Dave Filoni
- June Foray
- Pat Fraley
- Stan Freberg
- Nika Futterman
- Morgan Gerhard
- Frank Gladstone
- Seth Green
- Matt Groening
- Jennifer Hale
- Mark Hamill
- Jim Hanks
- Jess Harnell
- Peter Hastings
- David Herman
- Richard Steven Horvitz
- Gordon Hunt
- Danny Jacobs
- Tom Kane
- David Kaye
- Josh Keaton
- Tom Kenny
- Maurice LaMarche
- Phil LaMarr
- Meredith Layne
- Janet Waldo Lee
- Jeff Lenburg
- Rachael MacFarlane
- Jason Marsden
- Jeff "Swampy" Marsh
- Mona Marshall
- Chuck McCann
- Mary Elizabeth McGlynn
- Tom McGrath
- Ginny McSwain
- Jim Meskimen
- Breckin Meyer
- Kate Miller
- Laraine Newman
- Daran Norris
- Nolan North
- Colleen O'Shaughnessey
- Gary Owens
- Rob Paulsen
- Don Pitts
- Dan Povenmire
- Kevin Michael Richardson
- Andrea Romano
- Stephen Root
- Marion Ross
- Lisa Schaffer
- Dana Snyder
- Kath Soucie
- Tara Strong
- Cree Summer
- Lee Supercinski
- James Arnold Taylor
- Fred Tatasciore
- Jamie Thomason
- Lauren Tom
- Alanna Ubach
- Kari Wahlgren
- Jim Ward
- Pendleton Ward
- Billy West
- Gary Anthony Williams
- Wally Wingert
- Cedric Yarbrough
- Kris Zimmerman

== Production ==
DiMaggio noted that he had logged 150 interviews and over 160 hours of film.

== Documentary series ==
A documentary series with the same title is being developed with segments featuring different voice actors. It was planned to be released in 2020 but it fell through. It will continue to work through the interviews from the film.

== Accolades ==
Director Lawrence Shapiro won the Certificate of Merit at the 42nd Annie Awards.
