= The Beat (2003 film) =

- The Beat official DVD cover.
- Directed by: Brandon Sonnier
- Written by: Brandon Sonnier
- Produced by: Ryan Seashore; Jason Peterson; Scott Speer; Kenneth Arnold (executive)
- Starring: Rahman Jamaal; Jazsmin Lewis; Gregory Alan Williams; Brian McKnight; Steve Connell; Jermaine Williams
- Cinematography: Graham Futerfas
- Edited by: John Randle
- Music by: Rahman Jamaal; Chris Westlake
- Production companies: Symbolic Entertainment; Tripped Out Productions
- Distributed by: Allumination FilmWork LLC
- Release date: 2003
- Running time: 86 minutes
- Country: United States
- Language: English

The Beat is a 2003 American drama film written and directed by Brandon Sonnier and was screened at the 2003 Sundance Film Festival. At 20 years of age, Sonnier was the youngest director to have a feature film debut at the Sundance Film Festival. The previous record was held by Robert Rodriguez for El Mariachi. With limited release on Showtime, Black STARZ, and Encore in 2005, the film became an underground hip hop cult-classic, supported by a cast of internationally recognized rap artists such as Chino XL, Tak (Styles of Beyond) and Coolio, as well as Def Poetry Jam's Steve Connell. The film's star, Rahman Jamaal also wrote and produced the film's hip hop soundtrack.

== Plot ==
Philip Randall Bernard a.k.a. "Flip" (Rahman Jamaal) is faced with the decision to join the police force, or attempt to live his dream of becoming a Hip Hop/spoken word artist. The film shows both of Flip's possible futures.

== Cast ==
- Rahman Jamaal
- Jazsmin Lewis
- Gregory Alan Williams
- Brian McKnight
- Steve Connell
- Jermaine Williams
- Chino XL
