= Ex on the Beach (American TV series) season 6 =

American reality television program

Ex on the Beach Couples: Now or Never
- Season 6
- Presented by: Kamie Crawford
- No. of housemates: 18
- No. of episodes: 12

Release
- Original network: MTV
- Original release: February 9 – April 27, 2023

Season chronology
- ← Previous; Season 5

Ex on the Beach Couples: Now or Never is the sixth season of the American version of the reality television show Ex on the Beach. It premiered on MTV on February 9, 2023. In April 2022, MTV released a casting call for a new season, and also announced a new format for the show, featuring real life couples for the first time.

== Cast ==
While most of the cast are new to appearing on Reality TV, dating couple Jake O'Brien and Holly MacAlpine previously appeared on The Amazing Race Australia 6.

Cast member	Ex
Ben Salmon	Kellie Ross
Jade Croft	—N/a
Holly MacAlpine	—N/a
Jake O'Brien	Pala Negara
Jamie Dragon	—N/a
Thailah T	Charlie Low
Liam Forrest	—N/a
Leylah Linda	Samura Kamara
Sorinn Lillico	—N/a
Lola De Lepin	Christopher Patrone
Spari	Ri Nelson
Shayla Cruz	—N/a

== Episodes ==
No. overall	No. in season	Title	Original release date	U.S. viewers (millions)
66	1	"Journey to Engagement"	February 9, 2023	0.15
67	2	"You're Breaking My Heart"	February 16, 2023	0.13
68	3	"Secrets of the Past"	February 23, 2023	0.09
69	4	"Hitting Rock Bottom"	March 2, 2023	0.11
70	5	"We Need This Time Apart"	March 9, 2023	0.11
71	6	"I Can Love You Better"	March 16, 2023	0.12
72	7	"More Than Just Your Ex"	March 23, 2023	0.11
73	8	"Burying Your Relationship"	March 30, 2023	0.08
74	9	"Call Me By My Name"	April 6, 2023	0.10
75	10	"Reunited Doesn't Feel So Good"	April 13, 2023	0.12
76	11	"This Is What Heartbreak Feels Like"	April 27, 2023	0.10
77	12	"Now or Never"	April 27, 2023	0.08
