= Jermaine Williams =

American actor, producer, and dancer

- Born: Jermaine Charles Williams; December 31, 1982 (age 43); Los Angeles, California, U.S.
- Occupations: Actor; producer; dancer
- Years active: 1998–present

Jermaine Charles Williams (born December 31, 1982), is an American actor, producer and dancer from Rialto, California. He dances for the Norwood Kids Foundation.

He is best known for his role as Mushmouth in Fat Albert and Noel in Stomp the Yard. He appeared in the spoof film The Comebacks as iPod. He co-starred as Coleman "The Slaw" Galloway in the Disney Channel Original Series The Jersey. He currently appears as Antoine DuBois in the HBO Max original series The Pitt.

== Filmography ==
Year	Title	Role	Notes
1998	Bulworth	Paul Robeson	
1999–2004	The Jersey	Coleman "The Slaw" Galloway	35 episodes
2001	The Nightmare Room	Charlie	Episode: The Howler
2003	The Beat	Byron	
2004	Fat Albert	Mushmouth	
2005	Veronica Mars	Bryce Hamilton	Episode: "Lord of the Bling"
2007	Stomp the Yard	Noel	
2007	Moonlight	Phil	Episode: "Dr. Feelgood"
2007	The Comebacks	IPod	
2007	The Great Debaters	Hamilton Burgess	
2008	Extreme Movie	Leon	
2009	World's Greatest Dad	Jason	
2010	Three Rivers	Patrick Moss	
2010–11	Raising Hope	Marcus	5 episodes
2011	Pozzie Live	Star	
2011	The Family Tree	Trey	
2011	A Holiday Heist	Frank	
2012	All the Wrong Notes	Hype Elf	Episode: "Kanye Baby"
2013	The Boys of Abu Ghraib	Gable	
2017	Chips		
2020	Ratched	Harold	Recurring role
2021	Secrets of Sulphur Springs		
2025-present	The Pitt	Antoine Dubois	11 episodes
