= Eastern Mountain Sports =

American outdoor clothing and equipment retailer

Eastern Mountain Sports, Inc.
- Type: Subsidiary
- Industry: Retail
- Founded: 1967; 59 years ago in Wellesley, Massachusetts
- Founder: Alan McDonough; Roger Furst
- Headquarters: Meriden, Connecticut, United States
- Number of locations: 6 (October 2025)
- Area served: United States
- Products: Outdoor gear and clothing
- Parent: Frasers Group (2017–2022); GoDigital Media Group (2022–2024); Mountain Warehouse (2024–present)
- Website: ems.com

Eastern Mountain Sports (or EMS) is an American outdoor clothing and equipment retailer in the Northeastern United States headquartered in Meriden, Connecticut.

EMS sells outdoor equipment and clothing from both name brands and its own EMS line. The company also had a set of EMS Schools that offer classes in rock and ice climbing, kayaking, stand-up paddle boarding, trekking, and skiing. The EMS Schools headquarters was located in the White Mountains in North Conway, New Hampshire, and has other locations near the Adirondacks in New York, etc.

== History ==
EMS was founded in 1967 in Wellesley, Massachusetts by two camping enthusiasts, Alan McDonough, who was running the family hotel chain, and Roger Furst, a lawyer whose office was in the McDonough complex. They targeted the outdoor equipment market in Boston. The first store on Linden St. in Wellesley carried the Gerry outdoor equipment line as well as downhill skis.

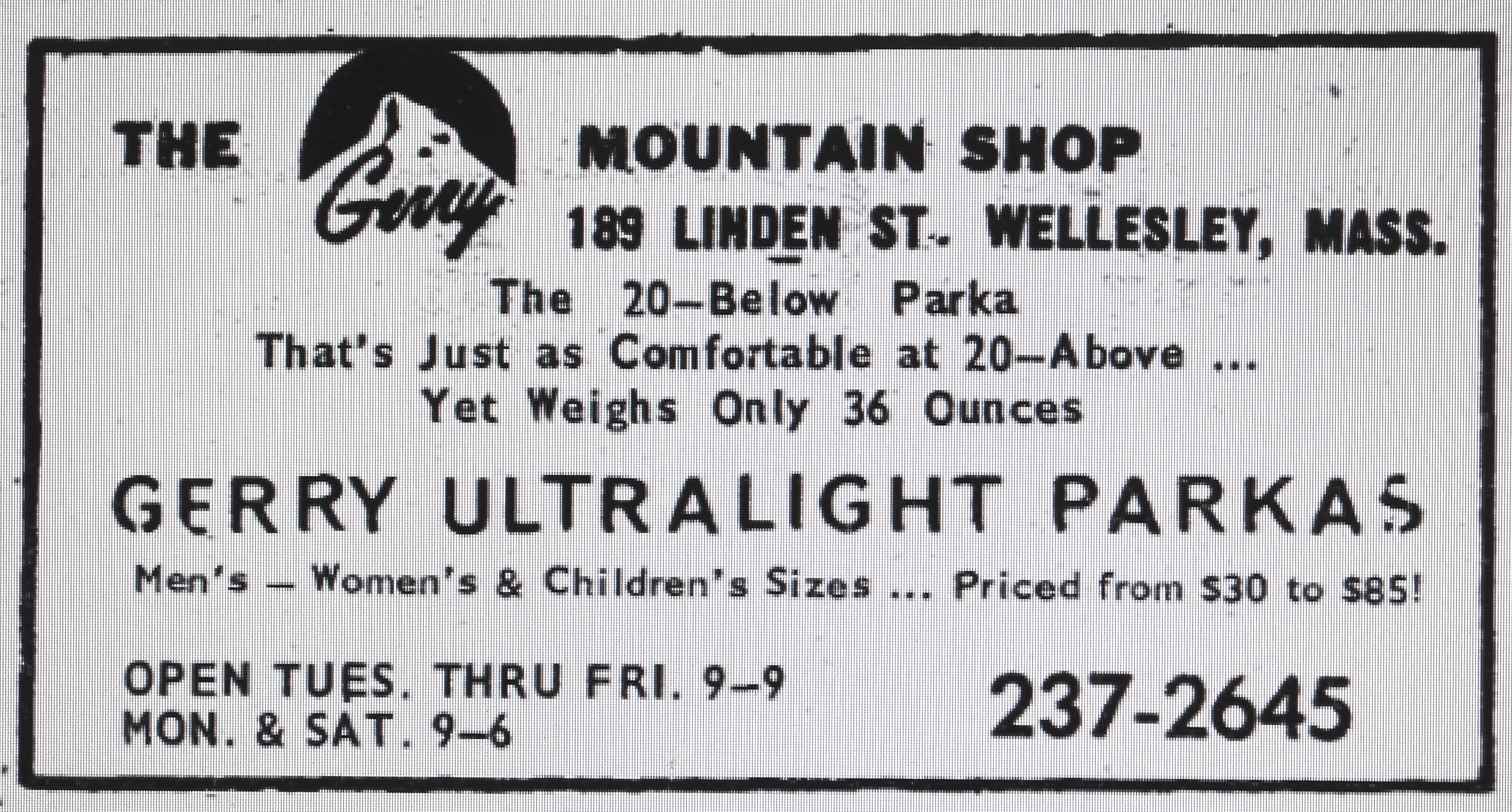
1967 advertisement

In 1968, the two enterprises merged and built the 1041 Commonwealth Avenue store – at 10,000 sq. ft. McDonough and Furst sold the company in 1979 to The Franklin Mint, which was acquired by Warner Communications in 1981. Four years later Warner sold the Mint but retained EMS, subsequently selling it to the American Retail Group, owned by the Brenninkmeijer family.

In July 2003 Will Manzer became President and CEO and shifted the company focus back towards specialty outdoors gear. A new logo, store reorganization, and a shift from stores in shopping malls to freestanding community-based stores followed.

American Retail Group sold Eastern Mountain Sports to investors led by J.H. Whitney & Company in 2004.

Bob Mayerson was announced as the new president in March 2010, as Will Manzer continued leading the company.

In 2012, Versa Capital Management bought EMS from J.H. Whitney and Mark Walsh became CEO. As of 2013, EMS operated over 70 stores throughout the Northeast US, from Maine to Virginia.

In April 2016, Vestis Retail Group, the Versa Capital-owned unit which owned the Sport Chalet and Bob's Stores sporting goods chains as well as Eastern Mountain, announced it had filed for bankruptcy protection and reorganization under Chapter 11 of the United States Bankruptcy Code. Vestis said it would reorganize and focus on the operations of Eastern Mountain and Bob's, while all Sport Chalet stores would close.

On 19 April 2017, Sports Direct International plc (Sports Direct) received permission to acquire Bob's Stores and Eastern Mountain Sports following Eastern Outfitters LLC's Chapter 11 filing.

In May 2022, Bob's Stores and Eastern Mountain Sports was acquired by GoDigital Media Group as part of its strategy to generate synergy between content, community and commerce.

In June 2024, GoDigital Media Group filed for Chapter 11 bankruptcy protection, marking Eastern Mountain Sports' third time in bankruptcy protection. The filing came after the company announced that up to 10 stores would close from both brands. GoDigital Media owed over 57 million dollars in unpaid debt to many of its creditors. As a result of the bankruptcy, the Meriden warehouse will close and all future online ordering purchases will be directed to stores.

However, in July 2024, SDI GoDigital Media Group announced that it would permanently close all of its remaining Bob's Stores and a select number of Eastern Mountain Sports locations, with liquidation sales beginning immediately after the announcement. However, up to 24 Eastern Mountain Sports locations would remain open during the bankruptcy proceedings, with 15 Eastern Mountain Sports locations being listed as clearance stores.

On September 3, 2024, the chain was acquired by British Outdoor retailer Mountain Warehouse for $10 million. Mountain Warehouse plans to expand the company and open as many as 100 new stores over the next few years.
