= Maty Ezraty =

American yoga teacher (1962–2019)

Maty Ezraty was an Israeli-born American, yoga teacher, and co-founder of YogaWorks. Born September 2,1963 in Israel to parents Yossi and Miriam Ezraty. In 1974 at the age of 11 years old Maty Erzaty, her sister Haggit, and their mother Miriam left Israel and moved to California. In 1987 before opening YogaWorks opened Maty met her long term partner Chuck Miller. Ezraty died at the age of 55 on July 9, 2019 in Tokyo, Japan in her sleep.

== Early life and education ==
Born in Israel, Ezraty moved to California in 1974 with her family. She began practicing yoga after graduating from Beverly Hills High School, inspired by her ballet classmates.

== Career ==
Maty Ezraty began taking yoga classes at the early age of 13 years old at the Center for Yoga in Larchmont Village. She originally started working at the front desk of the yoga studio in exchange for classes. Ezraty started teaching yoga in 1985 and soon became the director of the Center for Yoga in Los Angeles.

In 1987, she established YogaWorks with Chuck Miller, where they developed a new yoga methodology that integrated elements of both Ashtanga and Iyengar yoga. Opening their first studio in Santa Monica. Her approach emphasized both the flow of choreographed movements and precise alignment.

In 1992, Maty Ezraty teamed up with lyengar teach Lisa Walford to create the YogaWorks Teacher Training program. Maty's approach to yoga was "Ashtanga-influenced style of vinyasa with the precise alignment cues of the lyengar tradition". Her influence is still strong today and the teacher training program has been taught in over 20 countries, to over 15,000 students.

Ezraty and Miller sold YogaWorks in 2004 and relocated to Hawaii, although Ezraty continued to teach internationally and lead workshops. Ezraty died in 2019 while teaching in Tokyo. Her contributions to yoga, particularly in teacher training, helped to proliferate its practice across the U.S. and internationally.
