= Ex on the Beach (American TV series) season 5 =

Ex on the Beach
- Season 5
- No. of housemates: 24
- Location: Gran Canaria, Spain
- No. of episodes: 12

Release
- Original network: MTV
- Original release: March 31 – June 16, 2022

Season chronology
- ← Previous; Season 4 Next → Season 6

The fifth season of the American version of the reality television show Ex on the Beach premiered on MTV on March 31, 2022. It features ten singles from various reality television shows living together on the Gran Canaria Island of Spain with their ex-partners.

== Cast ==
Cast member	Original series	Exes
Arisce Wanzer	Strut	Mike Mulderrig
Da'Vonne Rogers	Big Brother 17	Jamar Lee
David Barta	Paradise Hotel	Danielle "Dani" Cohen (Mike Mulderrig)
Derynn Paige	Double Shot at Love	Ricky Rogers
Ranin Karim	—N/a	Elias "Eli" Abreu
Ray Gantt	Love Island 1	Caro Viehweg, Nicole Pisciotti, Alexis Garris
Bryce Hirschberg	Too Hot to Handle 1	Nicole O'Brien
Kyra Green	Love Island 1	Emily Salch
Alain Lorenzo	—N/a	Sher Suarez
Jonathan Troncoso	World of Dance 3	Joelle Piñero
Caro Viehweg	Love Island 1	Ray Gantt
Jamar Lee	Big Brother Canada 8	Da'Vonne Rogers, Minh-Ly Nguyen-Cao
Mike Mulderrig	Lindsay Lohan's Beach Club	Arisce Wanzer (David Barta)
Minh-Ly Nguyen-Cao	Big Brother Canada 8	Jamar Lee
Ricky Rogers	Double Shot at Love	Derynn Paige, Kathryn "Kat" Dunn
Danielle "Dani" Cohen	Are You Smarter than a 5th Grader?	David Barta
Elias "Eli" Abreu	—N/a	Ranin Karim
Nicole Pisciotti	—N/a	Ray Gantt
Kathryn "Kat" Dunn	Big Brother 21	Ricky Rogers
Emily Salch	Love Island 1	Kyra Green
Nicole O'Brien	Too Hot to Handle 1	Bryce Hirschberg
Alexis Garris	—N/a	Ray Gantt
Joelle Piñero	—N/a	Jonathan Troncoso
Sher Suarez	Love Island 2	Alain Lorenzo

=== Cast duration ===
Cast members	Episodes											
Cast members	1	2	3	4	5	6	7	8	9	10	11	12
Arisce												
Da'Vonne												
David												
Derynn												
Ranin												
Ray												
Bryce												
Kyra												
Alain												
Jonathan												
Caro												
Jamar												
Mike												
Minh-Ly												
Ricky												
Dani												
Eli												
Nicole P.												
Kat												
Emily												
Nicole O.												
Alexis												
Joelle												
Sher												

Table key
= The cast member is featured in this episode
= The cast member arrives on the beach
= The cast member has an ex arrive on the beach
= The cast member arrives on the beach and has an ex arrive during the same episode
= The cast member leaves the beach
= The cast member does not feature in this episode

== Episodes ==
No. overall	No. in season	Title	Original release date	U.S. viewers (millions)
54	1	"Can You Handle the Table of Truth?"	March 31, 2022	0.15
55	2	"Ain't That a Beach"	April 7, 2022	0.14
56	3	"The Lengths We Go to Lie to an Ex"	April 14, 2022	0.19
57	4	"Wait, That's Not an Ex"	April 21, 2022	0.21
58	5	"The Ex-Husband and the Best Friend"	April 28, 2022	0.15
59	6	"Seeing Is Believing"	May 5, 2022	0.16
60	7	"You Can't Get Divorced Twice"	May 12, 2022	0.21
61	8	"Ready For More Baggage?"	May 19, 2022	0.20
62	9	"Exes Court Is Now in Session"	May 26, 2022	0.19
63	10	"Something Like the Truth"	June 2, 2022	0.18
64	11	"Where's the Lie?"	June 9, 2022	0.20
65	12	"Setting Sail on a Relation-Ship"	June 16, 2022	0.22
