= Future Folk =

American musical duo, founded 2004

- Origin: New York City
- Genres: American folk music; Comedy; Filk music
- Years active: 2004–2017 (hiatus)
- Members: General Trius (Banjo) and The Mighty Kevin (guitar)
- Website: futurefolk.com

Future Folk is a New York City-based folk music comedy duo. Founded as a live act in 2004, the duo includes the characters General Trius (Nils d'Aulaire) and The Mighty Kevin (Jay Klaitz).

== Career ==
After co-starring in an Off-off-Broadway musical comedy titled Who Is Wilford Brimley?, d’Aulaire and Klaitz brainstormed ideas for an act that involved roots music from outer space. They composed songs for the project, which revolved around a fictitious planet named Hondo, and crafted costume helmets from plastic buckets and duct tape.

After a performance in New York’s East Village, they evolved the act, expanding back stories and developing their characters with each performance. They first appeared as Future Folk in 2005 at Tonic in Times Square, performing at a party celebrating the Westminster Kennel Club Dog Show.

In 2012, they released a studio album titled Future Folk, Vol 1.

=== The History of Future Folk ===
In 2012, Future Folk filmed a feature-length movie, The History of Future Folk, which chronicles the duo's arrival on Earth and their subsequent attempt to save both Hondo and Earth from annihilation. Jeremy Kipp Walker and John Anderson Mitchell, who provided writing, production and directorial guidance, simplified the pair's back story to accommodate the narrative within the film's modest budget.

In the film, d'Aulaire plays Bill Hunt, AKA General Trius, who has been on Earth for some time and has a wife and child, while Klaitz plays Kevin/The Mighty Kevin, who has been sent from their home planet to find General Trius. The cast includes Julie Ann Emery as Holly, the wife of Bill who believes that General Trius is just a name he made up for stories he tells their daughter.

The feature film was distributed by Variance Films in 2013. and became available on Netflix in 2014.

Future Folk received positive critical reviews, with the Washington Post describing their film performance as "goofy, endearing and wholesome," and the Los Angeles Times praising their "sweet harmonies" and "impressive acoustic picking."

=== Post-Film ===
The band's second album, Future Folk Live On Earth, was released in December 2014. It included live versions of many songs from their first album, as well as three new tracks (Hondonian Band, String Theory, and La Luna Extranjera). The band continued to play regular live gigs until 2016. Two new singles, Hondo and Rocket Tow Truck, were released in September, 2017, before the band went into an indefinite hiatus.

When asked by fans if the band planned to eventually return, General Trius explained they were "on vacation about 2.5 light years away" but did in fact plan on returning. As of July, 2021, the band said "We have some things cooking."
