= Sport Chalet =

American sporting goods chain

- Company type: Private – Vestis Retail Group
- Industry: Retail
- Founded: 1959
- Defunct: 2016 (original iteration)
- Fate: Chapter 7 bankruptcy
- Headquarters: La Cañada Flintridge, California, U.S.
- Number of locations: 47 at closure
- Key people: Norbert Olberz, founder
- Products: Apparel, Sports Equipment, Shoes, Snowsports, Team Sports, Climbing
- Website: sportchalet.com

Sport Chalet is an online-only sporting goods chain that at one point, had 47 stores in Southern & Northern California, Arizona, Nevada, and Utah. Most stores were over 35,000 square feet (3,300 square meters) in size, with many including dive pools and offering SCUBA classes. Sport Chalet stores usually featured large apparel and footwear departments complemented by an array of specialized departments and sections. On April 16, 2016, the company announced that it would close all stores in the coming months and that all online sales had already stopped. The last stores closed in June 2016.

== History ==
Sport Chalet was founded on April 1, 1959 by newlyweds Norbert Olberz, a former baker, and his wife Irene, who bought a ski and tennis shop in La Cañada Flintridge, California, for $4000, equaling a $2500 check plus a negotiation, from Milo Svoboda, the original owner, whose store had only been open four months. To initially stock the store with ski gear, the couple took out a $5,000 loan and borrowed money from a relative and some employees.

When surfing became popular in the early 1960s, the store began carrying longboards and wetsuits.

Sport Chalet grew piecemeal in La Cañada along Foothill Boulevard. Olberz converted a former grocery store into a full-line sporting goods store and an old furniture store became the ski shop. He also converted a gas station into a ski rental shop and opened a golf store down the street. Sport Chalet's location was about one block southeast of the intersection with Angeles Crest Highway, a major route into the San Gabriel Mountains.

The company opened its second store in 1981 in Huntington Beach, California. By the mid-1980s, the company expanded to have stores throughout Southern California.

Sport Chalet started being traded publicly on the NASDAQ exchange in 1992.

In 1997, Craig Levra came on board as president and in 1999 took over as CEO.

Norbert Olberz died in La Cañada Flintridge on July 15, 2011, survived by his wife Irene and his son Eric. Two years later Eric resigned from the board, replaced by Miki Berardelli, chief marketing officer of New York women’s clothing designer and retailer Tory Burch.

In 2014, Sport Chalet was sold to Vestis Retail Group for $17M, as well as absorbing its current $50M in debts. Vestis was owned by the private equity firm Versa Capital Management.

On April 16, 2016, Sport Chalet announced that all stores would close, with May 15 being the last day for customers to use gift cards and store credits, and that online merchandise sales had already been stopped. Subsequently, Vestis Retail Group, which owns the Eastern Mountain Sports and Bob's Stores sporting goods chains as well as Sport Chalet, announced it had filed for bankruptcy protection and reorganization under Chapter 11 of the United States Bankruptcy Code.

By June 2016, all stores had closed.

== Corporate environment ==
Sport Chalet claimed to pride itself on employing well-trained and knowledgeable employees who had extensive knowledge and/or experience in their respective departments, leading to one of the company's slogans 'The Experts'. Sport Chalet was one of the few major sporting goods retailers to focus on a broad array of more specialized sports, including kayaking, SCUBA diving, mountain climbing, canyoneering, and other extreme sports. Sport Chalet additionally used the slogan "We'll Take You to The Limit".

In 1998, Olberz gave $1.5 million (~$2.69 million in 2024) in stock to 109 employees who had been with the company for at least ten years.

The company was the title sponsor of the "U.S.B.A. California Regional Tour." The tour was a collection of three events that were sanctioned by the United States Bodyboarding Association, that took place at different Southern California beaches; events ran between June 7, 2008, and November 9, 2008.

Following the January 2010 earthquake in Haiti, Sport Chalet, in conjunction with Soles 4 Souls, began accepting donations of gently worn shoes at all their locations until January 31, 2010. They collected almost one million pairs of shoes in two weeks.
