= YogaWorks =

- Company type: Subsidiary
- Industry: Yoga
- Founded: 1987; 39 years ago
- Founders: Maty Ezraty; Chuck Miller
- Headquarters: Culver City, California, U.S., United States
- Services: Yoga as therapy Yoga teacher training
- Parent: GoDigital Media Group
- Website: yogaworks.com

YogaWorks, a subsidiary of GoDigital Media Group, offers yoga as therapy classes via streaming media as well as yoga teacher training.

== History ==
The company was founded in 1987 by Maty Ezraty and Chuck Miller. In 2003, when it had two studios, it was acquired by Rob Wrubel and George Lichter, two former executives of Ask.com.

In August 2007, the company raised $13 million of financing in a funding round led by Highland Capital Partners.

By 2008, the company had 21 yoga studios.

In July 2014, the company, which then had 29 yoga studios, was acquired by Great Hill Partners for $45.6 million from majority shareholder Highland Capital Partners.

In 2016, the company's studios had 3 million student visits.

In August 2017, the company became a public company via an initial public offering. At that time, it had 50 studios.

In November 2017, the company had 66 yoga studios in eight U.S. markets: Los Angeles, Orange County, California, New York City, Northern California, Boston, Baltimore/Washington D.C., Atlanta, and Houston.

In October 2019, Rosanna McCollough resigned as CEO of the company and Vance Chang resigned as CFO. Brian Cooper was appointed CEO.

In November 2019, YogaWorks teachers in New York voted by an overwhelming majority to unionize.

In October 2020, during the COVID-19 pandemic, the company filed bankruptcy and closed all of its studios.

In January 2021, the company was acquired by GoDigital Media Group for $9.6 million.
