= Jowharah Jones =

American actress and singer (born 1982)

- Born: 1982 (age 43–44); Philadelphia, Pennsylvania, U.S.
- Occupations: Actress, singer

Jowharah Jones (born 1982), also known as Jowharah Haddad-Jones, is an American actress and singer. She portrayed Nico Slater, daughter of Vanessa Williams' character, on the first season of the television series Ugly Betty.

== Biography ==
Born as Jowharah Haddad in Philadelphia, Pennsylvania in 1982, Jowharah Jones grew up in Hershey, Pennsylvania. She attended the Milton Hershey School, where she was an honors student and member of the girls' track team. She competed in the 300 hurdles and the 1600-meter relay. Inducted into the National Honor Society in December 1998, she graduated with honors from Milton Hershey in 1999. Following her graduation, she moved to New Orleans, where she attended Xavier University of Louisiana as a mathematics major. After a year at Xavier, she moved to New York City to pursue an acting career.

Jones trained at the Tisch School of the Arts at New York University. During the following four years, she worked two jobs as she attended Tisch full-time and auditioned for stage, television, and film roles. After graduating in 2004, she moved to Los Angeles.

== Filmography ==
=== Film ===
Year	Title	Role	Notes
2009	Janky Promoters	Loli Tyson	
2017	Backfire	Aminah	

=== Television ===
Year	Title	Role	Notes
2005	Veronica Mars	Yolonda Hamilton	Episode: "Lord of the Bling"
2005	Without a Trace	Shantel	Episode: "Neither Rain Nor Sleet"
2005	CSI: NY	Kaitlyn	Episode: "Supply & Demand"
2006	Ugly Betty	Nico Slater	3 episodes
2007	CSI: Miami	Amelia Clarke	Episode: "Broken Home"
2013	The Client List	Paula Cole	4 episodes
