= Test (2013 film) =

2013 film by Chris Johnson

- Promotional release poster
- Directed by: Chris Mason Johnson
- Written by: Chris Mason Johnson
- Produced by: Alan Balian; Chris Mason Johnson; Chris Martin
- Starring: Scott Marlowe; Matthew Risch; Kristoffer Cusick; Damon K. Sperber
- Cinematography: Daniel Marks
- Edited by: Christopher Branca; Chris Mason Johnson; Adam Raponi
- Music by: Ceiri Torjussen
- Production companies: Serious Productions; Gloss Studio
- Distributed by: Variance Films; Wolfe Releasing
- Release date: June 7, 2013 (Seattle International Film Festival)
- Running time: 89 minutes
- Country: United States
- Language: English
- Budget: $250,000
- Box office: $19,000

Test is a 2013 American drama film written and directed by Chris Mason Johnson, starring Scott Marlowe and Matthew Risch. The film is set in San Francisco in 1985, during the early years of the AIDS crisis. It follows Frankie, an understudy for a contemporary dance company, as he pursues a sexual relationship with another, more experienced dancer while fearing the unknown and navigating the stigmas of the time. The film premiered at the 2013 Seattle International Film Festival, and was screened at the 64th Berlin International Film Festival. It won Jury Awards for Best American Dramatic Feature Film and Best Screenwriting at Outfest in Los Angeles, California, and the Alan Ira Dusowitz Emerging Filmmaker Award for a feature film at the Tampa International Gay and Lesbian Film Festival.

== Plot summary ==
Test is set in San Francisco in 1985, shortly after the launch of the first effective HIV test, and depicts the effects of the AIDS crisis on members of a contemporary dance company based in the city. The film follows understudy Frankie, who prefers to escape the bullying of harsh graffiti and speculative news headlines by walking around listening to music on his bright yellow Walkman. While deeply concerned about possibly having contracted the disease, he strengthens his friendship with Todd, a bad-boy veteran fellow dancer who provides him with encouragement with his dancing and with whom he navigates the risks and hopes associated with the disease while pursuing a sexual relationship with him.

== Cast ==
- Sergio Benvindo as Sergio
- Evan Boomer as Tyler
- Kevin Clarke as Bill
- Kristoffer Cusick as Walt
- Rory Hohenstein as Tommy
- Madison Keesler as Jennifer
- Scott Marlowe as Frankie
- Matthew Risch as Todd
- James Sofranko as David
- Damon K. Sperber as Dr. Corbett
- Myles Thatcher as Sam
- Katherine Wells as Molly

== Production ==
Chris Mason Johnson wrote and directed Test, which he also co-produced with Chris Martin and edited with Christopher Branca. A portion of its post-production budget received a pledge of $35,600 from 179 backers on the crowd funding platform Kickstarter. Further grants for the production of the film came from the Horizons Foundation, the San Francisco Film Society, and The Kenneth Rainin Foundation. The film was shot in part at the Joe Goode Annex Studio in San Francisco.

The music for Test was composed by Welsh-born composer Ceiri Torjussen, who created a 1980s-inspired retro synth score, providing the film with a uniform and consistent sound throughout. Sixteen music tracks were released by MovieScore Media on June 3, 2014, and made available digitally on major music platforms.

The production participated in the San Francisco "Scene in San Francisco Incentive Program" administered by the San Francisco Film Commission.

== Release ==
Test had its world premiere at the Seattle International Film Festival in 2013, and premiered in Europe at a screening in the Panorama section of the 64th Berlin International Film Festival. Variance Films screened the film in thirteen U.S. cities, including New York City and Los Angeles, during the summer of 2014. It was released on DVD on June 17, 2014, by Wolfe Video, distributed by Wolfe Releasing, and made available on all major streaming services.

== Reception ==
=== Box office ===
Early weekly box office sales for Test averaged $1,228 per theater and peeked in week 5 on July 3, 2014, earning a total domestic gross of $18,823.

=== Critical response ===
Test received generally favorable reviews from film critics. In Slant Magazine, Clayton Dillard writes, "Adept as both timely character study and epochal drama, Test wonderfully manages fully formed humanism without sentimentality." Film critic Stephen Holden, included in The New York Times, "As Frankie, Mr. Marlowe delivers a quiet, moving performance of such subtlety and truthfulness that you almost feel that you are living his life." Expecting more, Martin Tsai added In The Los Angeles Times, "Writer-director Chris Mason Johnson [...] has little to say about gay life in the ‘80s and how AIDS affected gay men differently than it does today." For the magazine Under The Radar, Kyle Turner stated that "Writer/director Chris Mason Johnson does an impressive job mounting the film as a drama and very gradually allowing tension and paranoia to permeate."

On the review aggregator website Rotten Tomatoes, 82% of 22 critics' reviews are positive, with an average rating of 6.8/10. Metacritic, which uses a weighted average, assigned the film a score of 70 out of 100, based on 7 critics, indicating "generally favorable" reviews.

=== Accolades ===
Test won two Jury Awards, for Outstanding American Dramatic Feature Film and Outstanding Screenwriting at the 2013 Outfest in Los Angeles, the Alan Ira Dusowitz Emerging Filmmaker Award at the 2013 Tampa International Gay and Lesbian Film Festival, and was chosen as The New York Times Critic's Pick.

Award	Ceremony	Category	Recipient(s)	Result	Ref.
Alan Ira Dusowitz Emerging Filmmaker Award	Tampa International Gay and Lesbian Film Festival (2013)	Feature Film	Chris Mason Johnson	Won	
New American Cinema Award	Seattle International Film Festival (2013)		Chris Mason Johnson	Nominated	
Grand Jury Award	L.A. Outfest (2013)	Outstanding Screenwriting	Chris Mason Johnson	Won	
Grand Jury Award	L.A. Outfest (2013)	Outstanding U.S. Dramatic Feature	Chris Mason Johnson	Won	
Premio Maguey	Guadalajara International Film Festival (2014)	Best Feature Film	Chris Mason Johnson	Nominated	
John Cassavetes Award	Film Independent Spirit Awards (2015)	Independent Spirit	Chris Mason Johnson	Nominated	
John Cassavetes Award	Film Independent Spirit Awards (2015)	Independent Spirit	Chris Martin	Nominated	
