= Video Games: The Movie =

- Directed by: Jeremy Snead
- Written by: Jeremy Snead
- Produced by: Jeremy Snead; Cliff Bleszinski
- Narrated by: Sean Astin
- Cinematography: Jeremy Snead
- Edited by: Kenny Price
- Music by: Craig Richey
- Production company: Mediajuice Studios
- Distributed by: Variance Films
- Release date: July 15, 2014
- Running time: 101 minutes
- Budget: $109,025
- Box office: $23,043

Video Games: The Movie is a 2014 American independent documentary film by Jeremy Snead about video games. After Indiegogo and Kickstarter crowdfunding campaigns in 2012 and 2013 respectively, the film was released in 2014.

Snead said "about 45 hours of footage" was shot for the film, and intends to use that in future products, saying he plans "a follow up in some form or another because the reception of the film has been good and I think it's something that deserves more treatment in film and television."

== Reception ==
The film has a score of 40 out of 100 on Metacritic, based on 12 reviews. On Rotten Tomatoes, the film has an approval rating of 18%, based on 17 reviews. IGN awarded it a score of 7.0 out of 10, saying, "The new documentary Video Games: The Movie is an insightful albeit disjointed chronicle of the medium and the industry."
