= Mountain Warehouse =

British outdoor sports retailer

Mountain Warehouse Limited
- Formerly: Because It's There Limited (1997–2001)
- Industry: Outdoor clothing and equipment retailer
- Founded: 11 August 1997; 29 years ago
- Founder: Mark Neale
- Headquarters: Victoria, London, United Kingdom
- Area served: UK; Europe; New Zealand; North America
- Products: Hiking; Camping; Skiing; Cycling; Running; Fitness
- Subsidiaries: Eastern Mountain Sports
- Website: mountainwarehouse.com

Mountain Warehouse Limited is a British outdoor retailer selling equipment for hiking, camping, skiing, cycling, running and fitness.

Founded in 1997 by Mark Neale, Mountain Warehouse has grown from a single outlet store to over 400 stores in the UK, Europe, New Zealand, Australia and North America.

== History ==
In 1997, Mountain Warehouse was founded as the retail partner of Karrimor International, the UK based outdoor clothing and equipment manufacturer. Investment company 21 Invest (now Investindustrial) were Karrimor's lead investor.

21 Invest sold Karrimor's core business to South African leisure group Cullinan Holdings in February 1999. The stores, which were initially branded Karrimor, were subsequently re-branded to Mountain Warehouse. Under the new name, Mountain Warehouse began selling multi-branded outdoor clothing and equipment as well as its recently launched own brand of clothing.

In August 2005, NBGI Private Equity acquired the business from 21 Invest and managing Director Mark Neale, buying a majority stake in the company. CEO Neale reinvested most of his proceeds into the new acquisition. In the years that NBGI worked with Mountain Warehouse, their own brand product offering increased from 5% to 80%.

In July 2007, Mountain Warehouse management around Neale bought out NBGI Private Equity for £15m, backed by Icelandic investment fund KCAJ.

In August 2015, the private-equity arm of Lloyds Banking Group, LDC, took a 23% minority stake in the business as part of another £47m buyout by Mountain Warehouse management.

In November 2017, the management team led by founder and CEO Mark Neale bought out minority shareholder LDC to take full ownership of the retail chain. Mr Neale personally owns 85% of the business. The £85m deal was backed by the Royal Bank of Scotland and asset management firm Alcentra.

In 2019, Mountain Warehouse Holdings Limited set up a new company, ‘Zakti Activeware’, which was the new name for ‘Mountain Warehouse Active’ range, and transferred a lot of stock to the new stores. They were closed in 2018, and the website now redirects to their 'Active People' range.

In 2020, Mountain Warehouse Holdings Limited set up another new company ‘Neon Sheep’ to break into the gifts and accessories market, but these stores were closed in 2022.

In 2021 fashion retailer Animal was acquired for previous owner H Young Holdings launching it online in the same year. By 2024, Animal stores were reopening.

On September 3, 2024, Mountain Warehouse acquired the US-based retailer Eastern Mountain Sports for $10 million.

== Stores ==
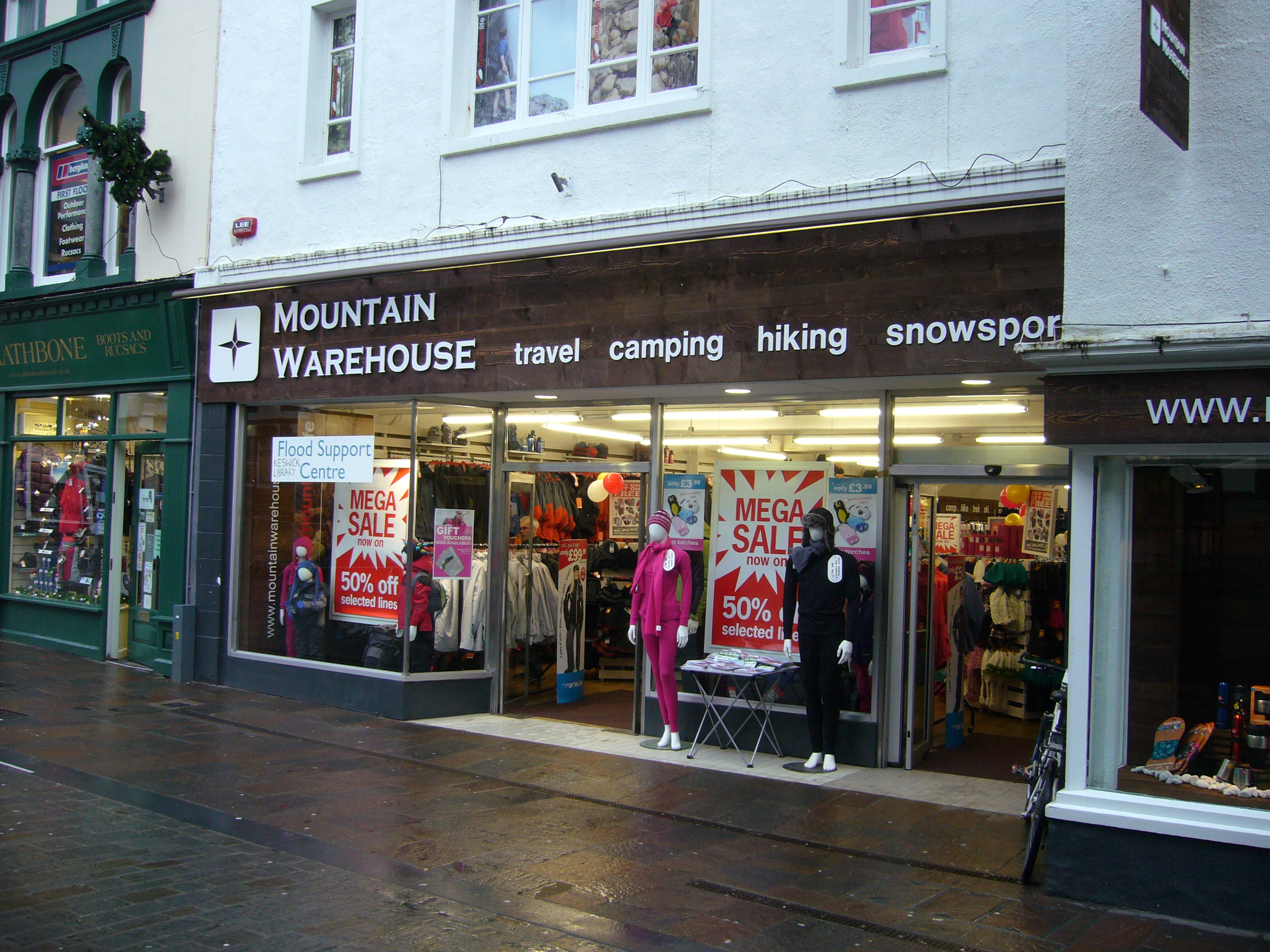
A Mountain Warehouse store in Keswick, Cumbria

Mountain Warehouse has over 400 stores in the UK, North America, Europe, Australia and New Zealand, including stores in Dublin, Ireland, Vienna, Austria, and stores in Poland including Warsaw.

The first Mountain Warehouse store opened in 1997. By August 2002 Mountain Warehouse had opened a further 13 stores in factory outlet centres in the UK and one in Vienna, as well as three concession stores in UK garden centres.

The London Covent Garden store was the first of Mountain Warehouse's high street stores. By 2019 Mountain Warehouse opened a further 9 stores in London, located in popular areas such as Regent Street, Fulham and Wimbledon.

Mountain Warehouse purchased six of former Woolworths sites, including Fort William, Scotland, St Ives, Cornwall and Buxton, Derbyshire.

Mountain Warehouse has continued to secure premises in market towns and locations popular with walkers and holidaymakers.

On 9 March 2024, Mountain Warehouse opened its largest UK store yet on Boscawen Street in Truro, Cornwall.

Mountain Warehouse opened its first North America outlet store in Toronto, Ontario, Canada early 2014. It has since further expanded to other North American locations including New Jersey, United States, Burlington, Canada and Vancouver, Canada.

Mountain Warehouse's headquarters are located in Victoria, London. A store is also located nearby in Victoria Place in London Victoria station.

== Products ==
Mountain Warehouse has grown from a stock clearance business selling only branded products to a business that sells mainly own brand clothing, footwear and equipment. In 2004 own brands including Mountain Life, Parallel and Snapdragon made up 10% of the business's products but by 2007 own brand products made up 65%.

In 2010 the retailer introduced a more technical clothing range, Mountainlife Extreme. The Mountainlife Extreme clothing range was designed to compete with higher end brands such as The North Face and Berghaus.

The Mountainlife and Parallel branding has gradually been phased out with all clothing, footwear and equipment now branded with Mountain Warehouse. Mountainlife Extreme was replaced by Mountain Warehouse Extreme, with footwear, accessories and equipment also included in the range.
