= Champs (film) =

- Film poster
- Directed by: Bert Marcus
- Written by: Bert Marcus
- Produced by: Bert Marcus; Mike Tyson; Mario Lopez; Grant Jolly
- Starring: Mike Tyson; Evander Holyfield; Bernard Hopkins; Mark Wahlberg; Denzel Washington; Ron Howard; Spike Lee; Mary J. Blige; 50 Cent; Naazim Richardson
- Cinematography: John Tipton
- Edited by: Derk Boonstra; Davon Ramos
- Production company: Bert Marcus Productions
- Distributed by: Starz
- Release dates: April 19, 2014 (Tribeca); March 13, 2015 (US)
- Running time: 85 minutes
- Country: United States
- Language: English

Champs is a 2014 documentary film focusing on boxers Mike Tyson, Evander Holyfield, and Bernard Hopkins. The film had its world premiere at the Tribeca Film Festival on April 19, 2014. Starz released the film on March 13, 2015, in a theatrical release and through video on demand.

== Cast ==
- Mike Tyson
- Evander Holyfield
- Bernard Hopkins
- Mark Wahlberg
- Denzel Washington
- Ron Howard
- Spike Lee
- Mary J. Blige
- 50 Cent
- Naazim Richardson

== Reception ==
Rotten Tomatoes, a review aggregator, reports that 67% of 27 surveyed critics gave the film a positive review; the average rating is 6/10. Metacritic rated it 59/100 based on 13 reviews, which indicates "mixed or average" reviews. Eddie Cockrell of Variety called it "slick but cliched", although "Marcus and his team make up in substance what they fall short of in style." John DeFore of The Hollywood Reporter wrote, "In his debut doc about superstar fighters, Bert Marcus offers more sociology than boxing fans may expect, using mean-streets origin stories not just for biographical intrigue but to comment on hardships his subjects faced later in life," as well as that the film is a "very polished doc has more on its mind than action in the ring." Neil Genzlinger of The New York Times wrote that the film "needs a trip through a cliché-removing machine". Robert Abele of the Los Angeles Times wrote that the documentary experiences "varied success" but "comes from a place of caring for an oft-maligned sport". Nick Schlager of Slant Magazine rated it 2/4 stars and called it "an unfocused mishmash that thrives only when it fixates on footage of actual bouts".

At Indiewire, Kevin Jagernauth wrote that it "examines what it means to be a man" and "while the director has no shortage of famous people showing up — Mark Wahlberg, Denzel Washington, Ron Howard, Spike Lee, Mary J. Blige, 50 Cent — their contributions are carefully and tastefully selected, with Marcus largely ceding to the more knowledgeable and less flashy experts, who are the ones that truly contribute the context to make Champs as insightful as it is", and Zeba Blay described it as "more a social documentary than a sports documentary". Ashton Morris of The Hot Zone said, "Bert Marcus, with keen intellect and whimsical creativity, illuminates a long ignored "issue" – that's putting it lightly – in a sport that has left its mark on the fabric of our country's history." Alan Ng of Film Threat rated 8/10 and said, "You’ll find inspiration from the stories of its three subjects and make you think again about the gladiatorial game and business, we know as boxing".

Additionally, various interviews with cast members the director were featured during the film's release, explaining that this film is more than just a boxing film. Sean Crose of Boxing Insider writes, "[p]erhaps that's why Marcus' new documentary, Champs, deals with more than just its main subjects: Mike Tyson, Evander Holyfield and Bernard Hopkins, respectively. Indeed, Marcus wants his film to start 'a conversation about really important issues.'"
