= Fine Cut: KCET's Festival of Student Film =

Fine Cut: KCET's Festival of Student Film is a television program that airs on the California television station KCET and is now in its tenth season. The program features the work of film students from various SoCal institutions such as the California Institute of the Arts, Loyola Marymount, UCLA, American Film Institute, Otis College of Art and Design, San Diego State University, and USC. Films shown cover all genres, but must have been produced within the last two years.
