= Logan Mulvey =

- Born: Logan Mulvey; August 22, 1984 (age 42); San Diego, California, United States
- Education: Loyola Marymount University (B.A.)
- Occupations: Managing Partner, STRIVR Labs, Inc

Logan Mulvey (born August 22, 1984) is the Managing Partner at STRIVR Labs, Inc, and the former CEO of GoDigital.

== Early years ==
Logan Mulvey was born in San Diego and grew up in Solana Beach, California. He attended Loyola Marymount University and received a BA in Communications with an emphasis in Rhetoric.

== Career ==
=== The Founding of GoDigital ===
While Mulvey attended Loyola in 2005, he co-founded GoDigital with Jason Peterson and Dave Lindsay. GoDigital began as a music distribution service and Mulvey created campaigns for a variety of films and platinum selling artists. At this point, he had produced music videos for top-selling artists such as Death Cab for Cutie, Lil' Romeo, Ashley Tisdale, Switchfoot, and Master P. He also created marketing campaigns for dozens of award-winning films and platinum-selling artists as GoDigital's Chief Marketing Officer.

=== As President ===
In September 2008, GoDigital announced the restructuring of their executive team, with Mulvey assuming the role of president. He had realized as Chief Marketing Officer that CDs and DVDs would soon prove obsolete and that the emerging digital market had a strong future. Under his direction, the company relaunched as a full-service distributor of premium, independent content to digital and Video on Demand (VOD) retailers. After GoDigital's re-organization, Mulvey's responsibilities were expanded to include the oversight of GoDigital's content operations team, marketing initiatives, global product management and release strategies for both new and catalog titles, orchestrating the distribution of feature film, television, and music content to hundreds of entertainment retailers including Netflix, iTunes, Hulu, and CinemaNow.

STRIVR Labs, Inc

STRIVR is a virtual reality company that specializes in sports training and building fan experiences
