= Bob's Stores =

American retail store chain

- Type: Subsidiary
- Industry: Retail
- Founded: 1954; 72 years ago
- Founder: Bob Lapidus
- Defunct: July 14, 2024; 2 years ago
- Fate: Bankruptcy and liquidation after failed expansion and failing to secure financing
- Headquarters: Meriden, Connecticut, U.S.
- Products: Clothing, footwear
- Owner: Dillon mailing and printing
- Parent: GoDigital Brands
- Website: bobstores.com

Bob's Stores was a chain of retail stores in the northeastern United States owned by GoDigital Media Group. Founded as Bob's Surplus in Middletown, Connecticut, by Robert "Bob" Lapidus in 1954, the chain expanded gradually until it was acquired by Melville Corporation and has been reacquired five more times since then. The chain targets moderate-income customers with a selection of footwear, workwear, teamwear, and activewear.

In July 2024, the company announced that all Bob's Stores nationwide would permanently close as part of bankruptcy filing; some locations of sister store Eastern Mountain Sports would also close as part of the proceedings.

== History ==
=== Early years ===
In 1954, Bob Lapidus opened Bob's Surplus on Main Street in Middletown, Connecticut. His original business strategy was to "Treat all customers with respect and dignity and they will return again and again". As Bob's Surplus increased in popularity, its location was hindering its growth; in 1962, Lapidus moved the store to a larger building across the street. In 1967, the store was forced to move again after a fire destroyed the building.

In 1975, the second Bob's Surplus was opened in Enfield, Connecticut; the third store was opened in Hamden, Connecticut, in 1981. The chain renamed itself "Bob's Stores" in 1985, and began changing its marketing strategy by emphasizing quality and adding casual activewear to its list of products.

In the 1970s and early 1980s, the Bob's Surplus circular logo was featured on a line of very popular t-shirts that were sold inexpensively or given away for free at their stores. Both the t-shirts themselves and the Bob's Surplus logo that was printed on them were available in a large variety of color combinations.

When the name of the chain was changed to Bob's Stores in 1985, the word "Surplus" on the logo was switched to "Stores." A new rectangular Bob's Stores logo was introduced in the 1980s. T-shirts with the new rectangular Bob's Stores logo—again in various color combinations—were also sold or given as freebies at their locations in the late 1980s and early 1990s.

=== Melville Corporation acquisition and sale ===
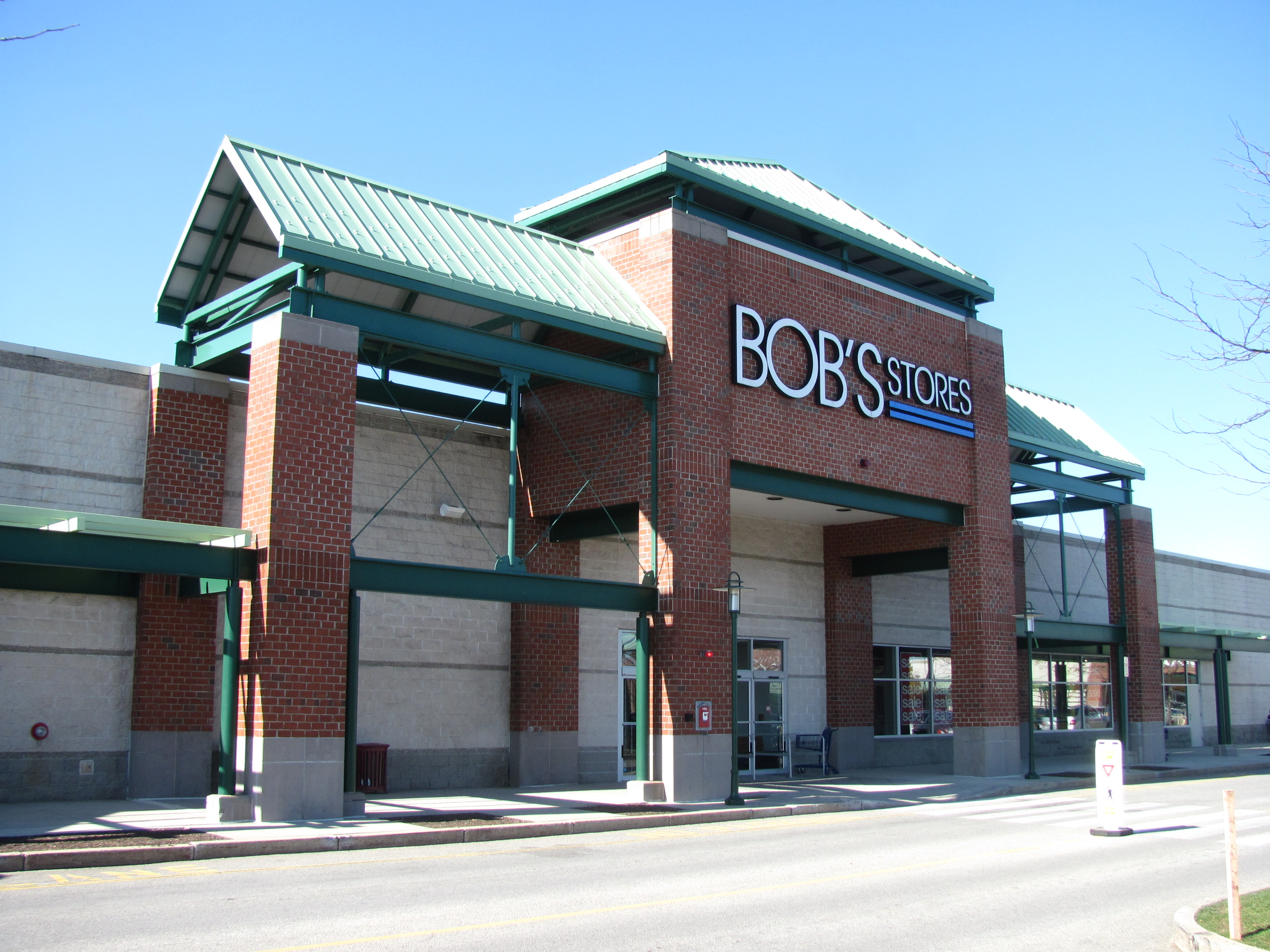
Bob's in Framingham, Massachusetts, pictured in 2011. This location closed in 2018, and is now a Public Lands.

In 1990, the chain had expanded to five stores; that year, it was acquired by the Melville Corporation (now CVS Corporation). Bob's expanded rapidly under the corporation; by March 1, 1996 the chain had grown to 34 stores across the northeastern United States. During this period, Melville considered Bob's Stores a key company, stating that they were spending time to "lay a solid base for rapid expansion for Bob's Stores in the years ahead". Bob's Stores remained most popular in its origin state of Connecticut.

In 1997, Melville sold all of its chains except CVS Pharmacy; Bob's Stores was sold to the chain's management and Citicorp Venture Capital. In 1999, the upper executive level of the chain experienced numerous changes in personnel. Many others in the company became concerned with competition from stores like Kohl's, which began entering Bob's market area in late 1999 by acquiring many former Caldor locations following that chain's liquidation (as well as other stores). However, Bob's focus on sports team-related apparel was considered a strength during this period; one Bob's executive stated that the lack of a consistent national sports champion in the late 1990s hurt larger chains more than they hurt Bob's Stores, because consumers were more interested in regional teams (which the chain supplies). In 2000, Bob's Stores created its first website.

=== 2003 bankruptcy and TJX acquisition ===
In 2003, Bob's Stores went bankrupt. In late 2003, Dick's Sporting Goods outbid companies such as TJX and tried to buy the chain for over $113 million. Dick's had intended to close most of the Bob's Stores locations. TJX felt that this was unfair to the employees and TJX brought it to court in Maine. The courts sided with TJX to save the thousands of jobs that would have been lost and TJX was allowed to purchase the chain.

TJX expressed interest in Bob's Stores because it shared similar characteristics to other TJX chains, including large stores and similar brands. Although there were also numerous differences between Bob's Stores and TJX's other chains, one expert felt that this would help diversify TJX's lineup.

=== Sale and 2016 bankruptcy ===
On August 19, 2008, TJX announced they would sell Bob's to private equity firms Versa Capital Management and Crystal Capital. Bob's Stores launched an online store June 1, 2012.

In April 2016, Versa Capital's Vestis Retail Group, which owns Bob's, Sport Chalet, and Eastern Mountain Sports, announced that it had filed for bankruptcy protection and reorganization under Chapter 11 of the United States Bankruptcy Code. Vestis said it would reorganize and focus on the operations of Eastern Mountain and Bob's, while all Sports Chalet stores would close. A new holding company, Eastern Outfitters, was created to manage EMS and Bob's stores.

=== 2017 bankruptcy and Sports Direct acquisition ===
By February 2017, Eastern Outfitters filed for bankruptcy. The company planned to close 48 of its 86 stores in the Northeast. On April 19, 2017, after expanding to nearly 50 stores at its peak, Sports Direct International plc received permission to acquire Bob's Stores and Eastern Mountain Sports for $101 million. Nine out of 13 stores in Connecticut alone were scheduled for closure.

=== GoDigital acquisition, final bankruptcy and liquidation ===
In August 2021, Sports Direct announced it would review its options after Nike noted it would stop supplying certain accounts include Bob's Stores. In May 2022, Bob's Stores and Eastern Mountain Sports were sold to GoDigital Media Group for $70 million.

In May 2024, 150 employees based in Meriden, Connecticut were laid off after its bank refused to provide funding for payroll and benefits. The company will look for alternative funding in order to avoid a complete shutdown.

In June 2024, SDI Stores filed for Chapter 11 bankruptcy protection, marking Bob's Stores fourth time in bankruptcy protection. The filing came after the company announced that up to 10 stores would close from Bob's Stores and EMS. SDI Stores owed millions of dollars in unpaid debt to many of its creditors. As a result of the bankruptcy, the Meriden warehouse will close and all future online ordering purchases will be directed to stores.

However, in July 2024, SDI Stores announced that it would permanently close all of its remaining Bob's Stores locations and a select number of Eastern Mountain Sports locations, with liquidation sales beginning immediately after the announcement. Stores were set to close on July 14, 2024, but as of September 2024, liquidation sales were still ongoing. The last stores closed by the end of September 2024. As a result of the announcement, future locations in Fairfield and Norwalk, both located in former Bed Bath & Beyond locations, never opened, amongst a planned remodel at its Manchester location that was supposed to include Eastern Mountain Sports.
