= GoDigital =

Digital and video-on-demand distribution company

GoDigital, Inc.
- Type: Film distribution
- Founded: 2008
- Headquarters: Beverly Hills, California, United States
- Parent: Amplify (2014–present)
- Subsidiaries: Distribber (2015–present)
- Website: www.godigital.com

GoDigital is a full service digital and video-on-demand (VOD) distribution company. Launched in 2008, the Beverly Hills-based company as of 2013 had a library of over 1000 films ranging from independent cinema to award-winning documentaries and foreign films. GoDigital has direct deals with a number of primary VOD services, including iTunes, Netflix, Amazon.com, Hulu and YouTube.

Co-founder Logan Mulvey was appointed the company's CEO. Mulvey was named by The Hollywood Reporter’s among its 2012 rising stars and IndieWire's Anne Thompson calls him a "wunderkind” within the digital space. Mulvey is on the board of directors of the Entrepreneurs' Organization and on the board of advisors of the San Diego Film Festival. He is a mentor at SXSW and a frequent speaker at digital entertainment conferences, including Variety’s BRIC Summit, Digital Hollywood, Variety's Film Finance Summit, and the New York Film Commission at the Sundance Film Festival.

Ed Ojdana, founder of FreeCreditReport.com and former CEO of Experian Interactive, serves as the chairman of GoDigital's board of directors. Chris Kelly, former Facebook Chief Privacy Officer and founder of Kelly Investments also serves on the board of directors alongside Logan Mulvey.

== History ==
=== Founding ===
GoDigital was initially launched as a music distribution service, co-founded by Jason Peterson (CEO), Logan Mulvey (CMO), and Dave Lindsay (CTO) through Santa Monica based digital media incubator GoDigital Media Group.

=== 2008 Reorganization ===
GoDigital switched to its current model in 2008 after the technology for digitally distributing movies became more readily available. GoDigital announced the restructuring of their executive team, with Mulvey assuming the role of president. He had realized as Chief Marketing Officer that CDs and DVDs would soon prove obsolete and that the emerging digital market had a strong future. Early investment into the business gave GoDigital an advantage, allowing the company to become a full-service distributor of premium, independent content to digital and Video on Demand (VOD) retailers. In late 2011, Go Digital Media Group was involved in several false copyright claims against YouTube uploaders posting their own original content. This, among many reasons, was the catalyst for YouTube restructuring its Content ID matching system.

=== 2012 Rapid Expansion ===
In January, GoDigital acquired VOD rival Might Entertainment, absorbing both their library and output arrangements. Jason Beck, the former VP of acquisitions at Image Entertainment who co-founded Might, is now chief content officer at GoDigital.

In February, GoDigital acquired all VOD, electronic-sell-through (EST), and pay-per-view (PPV) rights to Latin Anywhere's Spanish language film catalogue. The deal included more than 1,000 films from Mexico and marked the first time Latin Anywhere's content was available for digital distribution. In addition to expanding their library, this acquisition gave GoDigital access to the rapidly growing Hispanic demographic in the US.

In Fall of 2012, GoDigital received an investment from Preferred Ventures for a specialized focus on audience and consumer-community growth and identification. Preferred Ventures, a digital media investment firm, was launched by Ed Ojdana and Chris Kelly, who consequently joined GoDigital's Board. The investment was described as “a meeting of minds between the tech and movie worlds.”

In October, GoDigital partnered with Toronto-based 108 Media, acquiring the digital rights to eight 108 titles. Each film will see a theatrical release through 108 Media's partnership with Mark Urman's Paladin, which will include both traditional releases as well as day-and-date theatrical and VOD. GoDigital will be handling digital distribution for all titles.

=== Recent Developments ===
In early 2014, GoDigital hired former Focus Features executive Kent Sanderson as Executive Vice President of Distribution and Merchandising. Sanderson will be attending Sundance Film Festival 2014 in an acquisitions capacity and will have oversight of the company's cable, satellite and digital platform relationships. While at Focus, he worked on acquisition, distribution and marketing of Alex Gibney's “We Steal Secrets: The Story of WikiLeaks,” “The Lifeguard” starring Kristen Bell, “C.O.G.,” “The World’s End,” “The Place Beyond the Pines,” and “Moonrise Kingdom.”

Just before Sundance 2014, GoDigital announced that it was merging with Variance Films to form an all rights distribution company under the banner Amplify. GoDigital CEO Logan Mulvey is Amplify's new CEO. GoDigital continues to exist as a label under the Amplify umbrella, remaining a major player in the digital distribution space.

== Partnerships ==
Broadband: iTunes, Netflix, Amazon, Hulu, PlayStation, Xbox, Vudu, YouTube, Fandor, Bigstar, CinemaNow

MSO's: Avail-TVN, Dish, InDemand

== Notable Recent Films ==
- Dumbbells - Buddy comedy featuring a Fabio Lanzoni cameo
- Away From Here - A drifter is plagued with visions of his traumatic past, stars Nick Stahl and Alicia Witt, best known for Friday Night Lights
- I Know That Voice - Several voice actors such as John DiMaggio, best known for Futurama, and Kevin Conroy, best known for Batman, discuss their art and their careers
- Chasing Beauty - Provides a rare glimpse into the world of modeling
- The Motivation - A behind the scenes look at pro-skateboarding featuring Rob Dyrdek, Ryan Sheckler, Paul Rodriguez, and more
- The Punk Syndrome - Received the Audience Award at SXSW 2013
- Sons of the Clouds: The Last Colony - Produced by Academy Award®-winning actor Javier Bardem and screened at the 2012 Toronto International Film Festival
- Ben Lee: Catch My Disease - The story of Australian singer-songwriter Ben Lee, with commentary from ex-girlfriend Claire Danes and old friends Jason Schwartzman, Michelle Williams, Zooey Deschanel, Winona Ryder, Thurston Moore and Beastie Boy Mike D
- King Kelly - Screened at SXSW 2012
- She Wants Me - Starring Josh Gad and Hilary Duff
- Unraveled - A documentary about notable white-collar criminal, Marc Dreier
- She’s the Best Thing In It, an SXSW documentary, US distribution rights, available on demand, February, 2016
