= Jason Peterson =

American Media Mogul

Jason K. Peterson
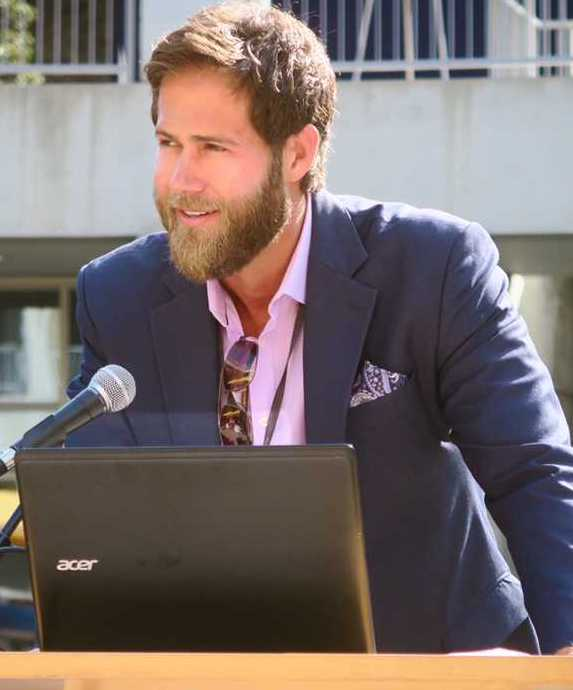
- Born: November 1, 1981 (age 44); Santa Barbara, California, US
- Education: Pepperdine University School of Law; University of Southern California
- Occupation: Entertainment producer

Jason Kimball Peterson (born November 1, 1981) is a media mogul, attorney, producer, entrepreneur, founder and chairman of multi-national conglomerate GoDigital Media Group. In 2009, he was named one of the "Top 30 Entrepreneurs Under 30" by the Los Angeles Business Journal. In 2014, Jason was awarded the coveted “Industry Leadership” Award by the Entertainment Merchants Association, the trade group for the $35 billion home entertainment industry. From 2017 to 2021, he was named a "Top 40 under 40 Power Player" in music and home entertainment by both Billboard magazine and Media Play News, respectively. From 2019 through 2022, he was named to Billboard's music industry "Indie Power Players List" and "Latin Power Players List" for managing Daddy Yankee's rights and for buying the Latino digital media company Mitú, respectively.

Peterson has worked with artists including Daddy Yankee, Janet Jackson, Jason Derulo, Master P, and T.I.

Jason has served as a director for major music distributor MERLIN as well as the American Association of Independent Music (A2iM), the Worldwide Independent Network (WIN), the Repertoire Data Exchange (RDx) a joint venture between WIN and IFPI creating a global recorded music data exchange, the Music Business Association, OTT.x the trade association for the video industry, and the Music, Film and Entertainment Executive Board at City of Hope Hospital in Los Angeles.

Peterson was an owner of Symbolic Entertainment, located in Marina del Rey, California, where he produced movies, commercials and music videos including "Stars" for Switchfoot in 2006, and TobyMac's "Boomin'", which won a Gospel Music Association Music Video of the Year in 2008. At 19, he produced The Beat, which was shown at the Sundance Film Festival in 2003.

Peterson earned his bachelor's degree from the Marshall School of Business at the University of Southern California (2004) and holds a J.D. from Pepperdine University School of Law (2007). He is an active member of the California Bar Association.

== Discography ==
=== Music Videos ===
Title	Details
Alejo x YannC x Full Harmony - Just in Case	Released: 2024; Label: Cinq Music Group, LLC; Format: Music Video; Credit: Producer
Haze x Brray x Juanka - Hola Cookie	Released: 2023; Label: Cinq Music Group, LLC; Format: Music Video; Credit: Producer
Omar Courtz x De La Rose x Haze - Kyoto	Released: 2023; Label: Cinq Music Group, LLC; Format: Music Video; Credit: Producer
Luar La L x House of Haze - Mi Juego	Released: 2023; Label: Cinq Music Group, LLC; Format: Music Video; Credit: Producer
Jhayco x Haze - En to Lao	Released: 2023; Label: Cinq Music Group, LLC; Format: Music Video; Credit: Producer
Joyce Santana x Brray x YannC - No Wey	Released: 2021; Label: Latin Cinq; Format: Music Video; Credit: Producer
Javiielo x YannC - Sube El Radio	Released: 2021; Label: Latin Cinq; Format: Music Video; Credit: Producer
Haze & Jhay Cortez & Lunay: Prendemos	Released: 2020; Label: Cinq Music Group, LLC; Format: Music Video; Credit: Producer
Haze x Reik - Haz Lo Que Quieras	Released: 2019; Label: Cinq Music Group, LLC; Format: Music Video; Credit: Producer
Anuel AA + Haze: Amanece	Released: 2018; Label: Latin Vidaprimo; Format: Music Video; Credit: Producer
YannC, Darkiel, Myke Towers, Eladio Carrion, Brray - Sigue Bailandome	Released: 2018; Label: Latin Vidaprimo; Format: Music Video; Credit: Producer
Janet Jackson & Daddy Yankee: Made for Now	Released: 2018; Label: Cinq Music Group, LLC; Format: Music Video; Credit: Producer
Yannc Full Harmony - La Nena ft. Juanka El Problematik, Gotay, D Ozi, El Sica	Released: 2017; Label: Latin Cinq; Format: Music Video; Credit: Producer
Switchfoot: Happy Is a Yuppie Word	Released: 2009; Format: Music Video; Credit: Producer
Switchfoot: Starz	Released: 2009; Format: Music Video; Credit: Producer
Kudai: Nada Es Igual	Released: 2009; Format: Music Video; Credit: Producer
Belinda: Ni Freud Ni Tu Mamá	Released: 2006; Label: EMI Film & Television Music; Format: Music Video; Credit: Producer
