= Distribber =

- Industry: Film distribution
- Founded: 2007
- Founder: Adam Chapnick
- Headquarters: Los Angeles, California, United States
- Key people: Nick Soares (CEO)
- Parent: GoDigital (2015-2019)

Distribber was a Los Angeles-based motion picture distribution company formed in 2007 by Adam Chapnick to help filmmakers distribute motion picture content into popular video-on-demand outlets. Distribber distributed feature-length narrative and documentary films, short films, and television series. They declared bankruptcy in 2019 while owing filmmakers thousands of dollars.

== History ==
In March 2010, Distribber was acquired by the popular crowdfunding platform, IndieGogo.

In May 2014, Digi Worldwide acquired Distribber from Indiegogo In June 2015 the full service digital and video-on-demand distribution company GoDigital acquired Distribber.

In January 2016, Nick Soares was appointed CEO of GoDigital Inc. In June 2016, Distribber partnered with the International Documentary Association to create a quarterly documentary grant program. Shortly thereafter, Distribber managed the digital release of Josh Fox's ‘How to Let Go of the World’ In August 2016, Distribber partnered with the theatrical distributor Abramorama to distribute high-profile indie films in video-on-demand.

== Restructuring ==
In September 2019, Distribber closed its offices, and GoDigital hired GlassRatner for restructuring.

== Releases ==
Distribber releases over 1000 films each year. Releases have included Range 15 with William Shatner and The Resurrection of Jake The Snake starring Jake Roberts.
