= List of iZombie characters =

The main cast featured in a promotional image for the television series. From left to right, Peyton Charles (Michalka), Ravi Chakrabarti (Kohli), Clive Babineaux (Goodwin), Olivia Moore (McIver), Major Lilywhite (Buckley), Blaine DeBeers (Anders), Donald Eberhard (Hodgson).

iZombie is an American comic book series created by Chris Roberson and Michael Allred, and published by DC Comics under their Vertigo imprint. The comic follows the story of Gwen Dylan, a zombie with vague memories of her past. Gwen becomes a grave digger to obtain brains to sustain herself. Gwen befriends various other mythical creatures including ghost Ellie Stuart and a were-terrier named Scott. Gwen dates a zombie hunter named Horito.

A television series developed by Rob Thomas and Diane Ruggiero-Wright loosely adapts the comic run. It premiered on The CW on March 17, 2015, and ran for five seasons concluding on August 1, 2019. The series stars Rose McIver as medical examiner Olivia Moore, Malcolm Goodwin as police officer Clive Babineaux, David Anders as criminal and brain-dealer Blaine DeBeers. Multiple characters recurred and were subsequently promoted to series regular including Aly Michalka, Robert Knepper, and Bryce Hodgson.

The following is a list of characters that have appeared in the comic and television series.

== Overview ==
=== Main ===
Actor	Character	Seasons				
Actor	Character	1	2	3	4	5
Rose McIver	Olivia "Liv" Moore	Main	Main	Main	Main	Main
Malcolm Goodwin	Clive Babineaux	Main	Main	Main	Main	Main
Rahul Kohli	Ravi Chakrabarti	Main	Main	Main	Main	Main
Robert Buckley	Major Lilywhite	Main	Main	Main	Main	Main
David Anders	Blaine "DeBeers" McDonough	Main	Main	Main	Main	Main
Aly Michalka	Peyton Charles	Recurring	Recurring	Main	Main	Main
Robert Knepper	Angus McDonough		Recurring	Recurring	Main	
Bryce Hodgson	Don "Don E." Eberhard		Recurring	Recurring	Recurring	Main
Bryce Hodgson	Scott "Scott E." Eberhard	Recurring				Guest

=== Recurring and guest starring ===
Actor	Character	Seasons				
Actor	Character	1	2	3	4	5
Molly Hagan	Eva Moore	Recurring	Guest			Recurring
Nick Purcha	Evan Moore	Recurring	Guest			Guest
Aliza Vellani	Marcy Khan	Recurring				
Aleks Paunovic	Julien Dupont	Recurring				
Bradley James	Lowell Tracey	Recurring				
Hiro Kanagawa	Daniel Suzuki	Recurring			Guest	
Steven Weber	Vaughn Du Clark	Recurring	Recurring			
Leanne Lapp	Rita Du Clark	Guest	Recurring			
Matthew MacCaull	Sebastian Meyer	Recurring				
Daran Norris	Johnny Frost	Recurring	Guest	Recurring	Recurring	Guest
Carrie Anne Fleming	Candy Baker	Guest	Recurring	Recurring	Recurring	Recurring
Marci T. House	Lieutenant Devore	Guest	Recurring	Recurring		
Sarah-Jane Redmond	Jackie	Recurring				
Elise Gatien	Corinne	Recurring				
Dakota Daulby	Tommy	Recurring				
Ryan Beil	Jimmy Hahn	Recurring	Guest	Recurring	Recurring	Recurring
Darryl Quon	Luta	Recurring				
Tanja Dixon-Warren	Cissie	Recurring				
Tim Chiou	AJ Jin	Guest		Guest	Recurring	Guest
Jessica Harmon	Dallas Anne "Dale" Bozzio		Recurring	Recurring	Recurring	Recurring
Eddie Jemison	Stacey Boss		Recurring	Recurring	Guest	Recurring
Greg Finley	Drake Holloway		Recurring	Guest		
Andre Tricoteux	Chief		Recurring	Guest		
Kurt Evans	Floyd Baracus		Recurring	Recurring	Recurring	
Robert Salvador	Detective Cavanaugh		Recurring	Recurring	Recurring	Recurring
Cole Vigue	Harris		Recurring	Recurring	Recurring	Recurring
Andrea Savage	Vivian Stoll		Recurring	Recurring		
Colin Lawrence	Janko		Recurring			
Nathan Barrett	Tanner		Recurring	Recurring	Recurring	Guest
Patrick Gallagher	Jeremy Chu		Recurring	Guest		
Brooke Lyons	Natalie		Guest	Recurring		
Bradley Stryker	Kenny		Recurring			
Enrico Colantoni	Lou Benedetto		Recurring		Guest	
Yani Gellman	Gabriel		Recurring			
Debs Howard	Steph		Recurring			
Natasha Burnett	Regina Sumner		Recurring			
Miriam Flynn	Mrs. Holloway		Recurring			
Paul Anthony	"Speedy" Pete		Recurring			
Lola St. Vil	Pam		Recurring			
Justin Prentice	Brody Johnson		Recurring			
Jerry Trimble	Roger Thrunk		Recurring			
Ray Galletti	Harry Cole		Recurring			
Julian Paul	Telly Levins		Recurring			
Ted Cole	Tim Addis		Recurring	Guest		
Antonio Cayonne	Colin Andrews		Recurring			
Ken Marino	Brandt Stone		Guest	Guest		Guest
Keith Dallas	Billy Cook		Guest	Recurring		
Rob Thomas	Rob Thomas		Recurring			
Tongayi Chirisa	Justin Bell			Recurring	Guest	Recurring
Andrew Caldwell	Harley Johns			Recurring		
Jason Dohring	Chase Graves			Recurring	Recurring	
Ella Cannon	Rachel Greenblatt			Recurring	Guest	
Anjali Jay	Carey Gold			Recurring		
Mike Dopud	A.K. Fortesan			Recurring		
Aidan Kahn	Zach Stoll			Recurring		
Ryan Jefferson Booth	Dino			Recurring	Recurring	
Christina Cox	Katty Kupps			Recurring		
Sarah Jurgens	Shawna			Recurring		
Ava Frye	Tatum Weckler			Recurring		
Anisha Cheema	Patrice Gold			Recurring		
Mateo Mingo	Wally Reid			Recurring		
Peter Kelamis	Mr. Huntsman			Recurring		
Gordon Michael Woolvett	James Weckler			Recurring		
Kett Turton	"Vampire" Steve			Recurring	Recurring	Recurring
Adam Greydon Reid	Hobbs				Recurring	Recurring
Jake Manley	Fisher "Captain Seattle" Webb				Recurring	
Jade Payton	Jordan Gladwell				Recurring	Recurring
Giacomo Baessato	Russ Roche				Recurring	
Nathanael Vass	Reid Sackman				Recurring	
Jaren Brandt Bartlett	Tucker Fritz				Recurring	
Nick Heffelfinger	Mace				Recurring	
Keenan Tracey	Tim Timmerson				Recurring	
Dawnn Lewis	Mama "Renegade" Leone				Recurring	
Ryan Devlin	Dalton				Guest	Recurring
Laura Bilgeri	Sloane Mills				Guest	Recurring
Micah Steinke	Stan				Recurring	Recurring
Christie Laing	Michelle				Recurring	Recurring
Daniel Bonjour	Levon Patch				Recurring	
Elfina Luk	Joyce Collins				Recurring	Recurring
John Emmet Tracy	Enzo Lambert				Recurring	Recurring
Emy Aneke	Matthew Voss				Recurring	Recurring
Francis Capra	Baron				Guest	Recurring
Melissa O'Neil	Suki				Recurring	
Izabela Vidovic	Isobel Bloom				Recurring	
Nemo Cartwright	"Crybaby" Carl				Recurring	Recurring
Samuel Patrick Chu	Curtis				Recurring	Recurring
Jennifer Irwin	Dolly Durkins					Recurring
Gage Golightly	Alice "Al" Bronson					Recurring
Bill Wise	Martin "Beanpole Bob" Roberts					Recurring
Valerie Tian	Darcy Bennett					Recurring
Andrew Kavadas	General Mills					Recurring
Quinta Brunson	Dr. Charli Collier					Recurring

== Comic series ==
=== Main characters ===
==== Gwen Dylan ====
Gwen Dylan
- iZombie character
- Gwen Dylan on the cover of iZombie vol. 4 #27 (July 2012). Art by Michael Allred.
- First appearance: "Dead to the World" (2010)
- Last appearance: "Repossession" (2012)
- Created by: Chris Roberson; Michael Allred

In-universe information
- Full name: Gwendolyn Rose Price
- Alias: Gwen Dylan
- Species: Goddess; Zombie (formerly); Human (formerly)
- Occupation: Gravedigger; College student (formerly)
- Family: Mr. and Mr. Price (parents); Gavin Price (brother); Scott "Spot" (brother-in-law)
- Significant other: Horatio

Gwendolyn Rose "Gwen" Dylan (née Price) is the series' main protagonist. After rising from her grave as a zombie with scattered memories of her past, Gwen takes up residence in her graveyard's crypt, taking a job as a gravedigger so she could have access to the brains required every 30 days to stave off mindlessness by absorbing residue soul essence (in-doing so inheriting parts of the deceased's thoughts and memories), and befriending a local ghost named Ellie and were-terrier named Scott. Several years after becoming a zombie, Gwen learns she was resurrected by local mummy John Amon, seeking her assistance in preventing the dark god Xitalu from consuming the souls of everyone on Earth. Able to pass as human, Gwen begins dating a monster hunter named Horatio, who is initially unaware of her undead status, while Scott begins dating Gwen's brother Gavin, both unaware of their relation. Ultimately, Amon and Gwen are revealed to have known each other before her death, and she had voluntarily killed herself in order to become a zombie and defeat Xitalu. However, upon Xitalu's arrival, Gwen decides to go against Amon's plan to sacrifice the souls of her town to stave off Xitalu for another few millennia, and instead, recognizing his method of absorbing souls to be identical to her own brain consumption, and that Xitalu is themselves a "cosmic zombie", Gwen absorbs Xitalu's soul, becoming a celestial being larger than the Earth. Bidding her friends and family goodbye, Gwen ascends to the cosmos.

==== Ellie Stuart ====
Eleanor "Ellie" Stuart (née Roosevelt) is Gwen's best friend, befriending her shortly after witnessing her crawl from her grave. Named after Eleanor Roosevelt, Ellie died in the 1960s after getting hit by a bus, before returning as a "ghost" or "bodiless oversoul". Ellie subsequently befriends a were-terrier named Scott and local mummy John Amon, the latter of whom teaches her how to possess people. Ellie then uses the ability to begin dating again, forming a polyamorous relationship with the vampire Claire and a revenant known as Francisco, later involving Francisco's ex-girlfriend Tricia.

==== Scott "Spot" ====
Scott, referred to by his friends as Spot, is a were-terrier and best friend of Gwen Dylan and Ellie Stuart, the former of whom he is initially in love with. He is later revealed to be bisexual and starts dating Gwen's brother Gavin, ultimately marrying him. After being present at his grandfather Marvin's ("Gramps"') deathbed, Scott inadvertently causes his soul to be bound to a chimpanzee.

==== Horatio ====
Horatio is an Asian-American monster hunter working for the Fossor Corporation, whose previous girlfriend Bethany was eaten by zombies. Initially investigating a coven of vampires residing in her town with his mentor Diogenes, Horatio begins to date Gwen initially unaware of her species, while she quickly deduces that he is a monster hunter. Upon being informed by her species by Diogenes and criticized for not being able to immediately recognise her as a zombie, Horatio is initially taken aback, before deciding to continue to date Gwen.

==== John Amon ====
John Amon is a mummy who has been alive for thousands of years. Resurrecting Gwen Dylan as a zombie for the purposes of using her abilities to prevent the dark god Xitalu from consuming the souls of everyone on Earth, Amon also seeks to cure his wife Ubasti of her were-jaguar nature, which leaves her confined to leopard form for every day of the year but one.

==== Claire ====
Claire is a vampire who turned her sorority into vampires shortly after being turned into a vampire, whom Horatio and Diogenes kill in their pursuit of their subsequently-created coven, led by Nemia. Shortly afterward, Claire is resurrected by Galatea, serving as her lab assistant in preparing for the arrival of Xitalu, before calling a truce with Nemia in order to join their forces together. Claire later forms a polyamorous relationship with ghost Ellie Stuart and revenant Francisco.

==== Gramps ====
Marvin, known by Scott as "Gramps", is Scott's estranged grandfather, whose soul Scott inadvertently binds to chimpanzee after being present at his deathbed.

==== Galatea ====
Galatea is John Amon's ex-girlfriend, also known as Lady Frankenstein, who seeks to use Xitalu's power to ascend to godhood.

=== Supporting characters ===
- Vincent Tan: A friend and co-worker of Scott.
- Ashok Patel: A friend and co-worker of Scott and Vincent.
- Nemia: The leader of Claire's coven, a sorority turned into vampires.
- Gavin Price: Gwen's younger brother, a gay man interested in Scott.
  - Phantasm: A 1930s-era vigilante poltergeist, who shares a body with Gavin.
- Dixie: A waitress romantically interested in Marvin.
- Ubasti: John Amon's wife, a were-jaguar.
- Diogenes: Horatio's mentor, a monster hunter with a scarred eye.
- Bethany: Horatio's deceased girlfriend, who was eaten by zombies.
- Tricia: A friend of Gwen's from when she was alive, who is turned into a vampire.
- Francisco: An ex-boyfriend of Tricia's resurrected as a revenant by Galatea and Claire.
- V.E.I.L.: A secret organization of monsters who hunt other monsters hunters.
  - Kennedy: A vampiric and afroed secret agent and leader of the "Dead Presidents"
  - Nixon and Nobody: A bald and blonde pair of secret agents.
  - Zombie Lincoln: The 16th president of the United States and leader of V.E.I.L.
- Dr. Valentin Kovsky: A Russian scientist who has resurrected himself as a brain in a jar.
- Komandir Koschei: Dr. Kovsky's assistant, whom he has resurrected as a revenant.
- Strider: The herald of Xitalu, who borrows Horatio's form to warn humanity of Xitalu's arrival.
- Mr. and Mrs Price: Gwen's and Gavin's parents.
- Xitalu: A dark god and "cosmic zombie" seeking to absorb all souls on Earth.

== Television series ==
=== Main characters ===
==== Olivia "Liv" Moore ====
Olivia "Liv" Moore
- iZombie character
- First appearance: "Pilot" (2015)
- Last appearance: "All's Well That Ends Well" (2019)
- Created by: Rob Thomas; Diane Ruggiero-Wright
- Based on: Gwen Dylan by: Chris Roberson; Michael Allred
- Portrayed by: Rose McIver

In-universe information
- Alias: Renegade
- Species: Human (formerly); Zombie
- Occupation: Assistant medical examiner at SPD
- Family: Martin Roberts (father); Eva Moore (mother); Evan Moore (brother)
- Spouse: Major Lilywhite (husband)
- Significant others: Lowell Trace (former boyfriend; deceased); Drake Holloway (former boyfriend; deceased); Justin Bell (former boyfriend; deceased); Levon Patch (former boyfriend; deceased)
- Children: Unnamed adoptive children

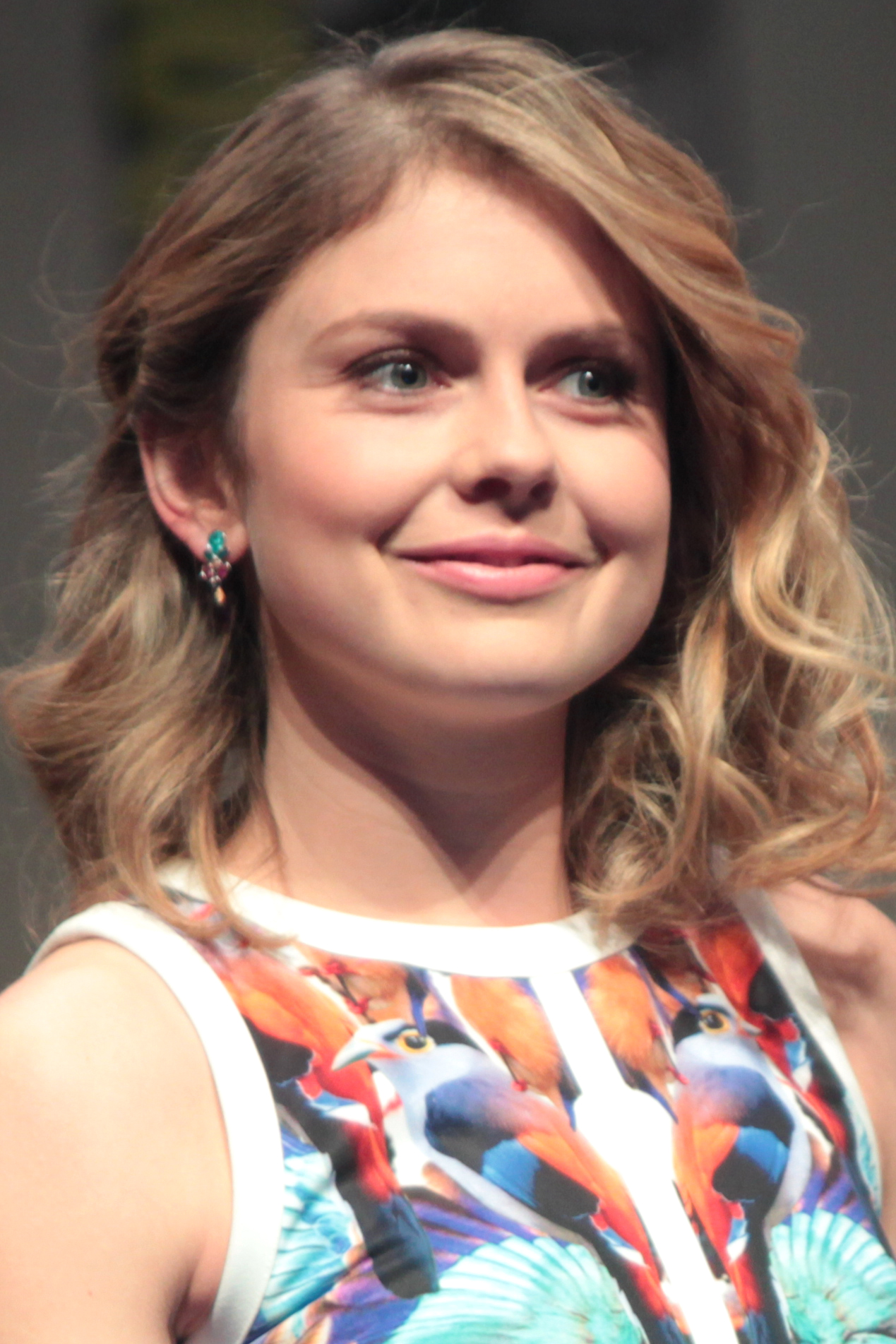
Rose McIver

Olivia "Liv" Moore (portrayed by Rose McIver) is the series' main protagonist. A former medical resident who became a zombie when she attended a boat party that was attacked by people who had just taken a new designer drug called "Utopium" while also consuming the Max Rager energy drink. She was scratched by Blaine while he was in full-on zombie mode.

She worked as an assistant medical examiner for the King County Medical Examiner's Office which allowed easy access to human brains. She must frequently consume human brains to maintain her humanity and suppress her hunger. Without feeding, she becomes increasingly less intelligent and would eventually turn into a classic zombie that exhibits no human traits and only craves for brains.

She experiences flashes of memories from the brains she eats, and temporarily takes on random quirks from her subjects—ranging from a fear of pigeons to a sudden appreciation for art to martial arts skills—and has demonstrated the ability to take a bullet to the chest with little damage. Through her visions, Liv vows to use her powers to bring justice to the victims and help Seattle Police find and apprehend murderers. Even with an available cure, Liv is reluctant to take it due to its side effects and her love for solving murder cases.

When Liv enters so-called "Full-on Zombie Mode" her eyes turn red and her strength is vastly increased. The change is triggered by intense stress or anger (or hunger), and the zombie has very little control over the trigger.

In the third-season finale, the existence of zombies is revealed to the world, and by refusing to tan or dye Liv decides to make her zombie status public.

In the fourth season, she inherits the alias "Renegade", eventually becoming a public figure after smuggling individuals in and out of the city.

==== Clive Babineaux ====
Clive Babineaux
- iZombie character
- First appearance: "Pilot" (2015)
- Last appearance: "All's Well That Ends Well" (2019)
- Created by: Rob Thomas; Diane Ruggiero-Wright
- Portrayed by: Malcolm Goodwin

In-universe information
- Species: Human
- Occupation: Homicide detective at SPD; Police captain at SPD
- Spouse: Dale Bozzio (wife)
- Significant others: Anna Reid (ex-crush); Regina Sumner (ex-girlfriend); Michelle Hunter (ex-girlfriend)
- Children: Jacob Babineaux (adopted son); Olivia Babineaux (daughter)

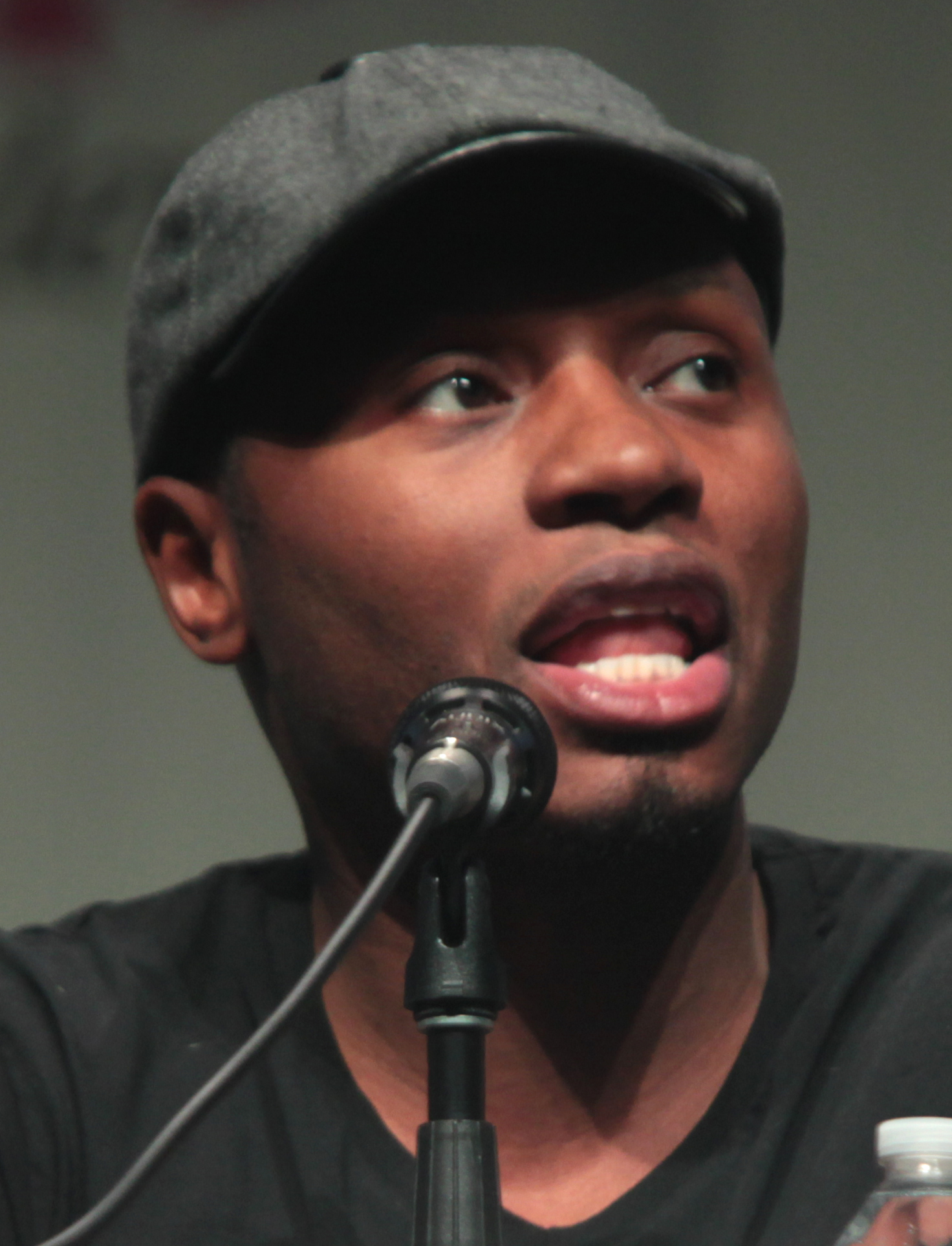
Malcolm Goodwin

Clive Babineaux (portrayed by Malcolm Goodwin) is a Seattle PD detective, newly transferred from vice to homicide when the series starts, who gets Liv's help to solve crimes. Liv and Ravi claim that she is "psychic-ish" to account for her knowledge of victims. With her help, Clive has solved many cases in an incredibly efficient and accurate fashion, hoping one day to be promoted to captain.

In the second season, Clive begins dating FBI agent Dale Bozzio, with whom he investigates the "Chaos Killer" disappearances in addition to his cases with Liv. After Bozzio arrests Major, Liv is forced to tell him she is a zombie and that her "psychic skills" are actually a side effect from eating the brains of the victims. He arranged for Major to be released from prison, but Dale leaves him when he cannot provide her with a suitable reason why.

In the third season, Clive receives his own story arc; as he is galvanized to investigate the murder of a family he was close to, and who were revealed to have become zombies affiliated with Fillmore-Graves. He also reunites with his love interest, Dale Bozzio, confessing to her the truth about zombies shortly before she herself is turned.

In the fourth-season finale, Dale is cured and the two are married. Though Clive states he would rather be Dale's husband than a father, it's implied that their daughter Olivia was made that night. They also adopted a son of Clive's ex-girlfriend who was killed in a suicide bombing in the series finale whom Clive initially thought he fathered since he couldn't have sexual relations with Dale while she was still a zombie. By the end of the series, Clive is the only main character who never becomes a zombie at any point during the series.

==== Ravi Chakrabarti ====
Ravi Chakrabarti
- iZombie character
- First appearance: "Pilot" (2015)
- Last appearance: "All's Well That Ends Well" (2019)
- Created by: Rob Thomas; Diane Ruggiero-Wright
- Based on: Scott "Spot" by: Chris Roberson; Michael Allred
- Portrayed by: Rahul Kohli

In-universe information
- Species: Human; Human/zombie hybrid (formerly)
- Occupation: Medical examiner at SPD; Director of the CDC
- Significant others: Peyton Charles (wife); Steph (ex-girlfriend); Katty Kupps (one-night stand); Rachel Greenblatt (ex-crush); unnamed CDC employee (one-night stand)

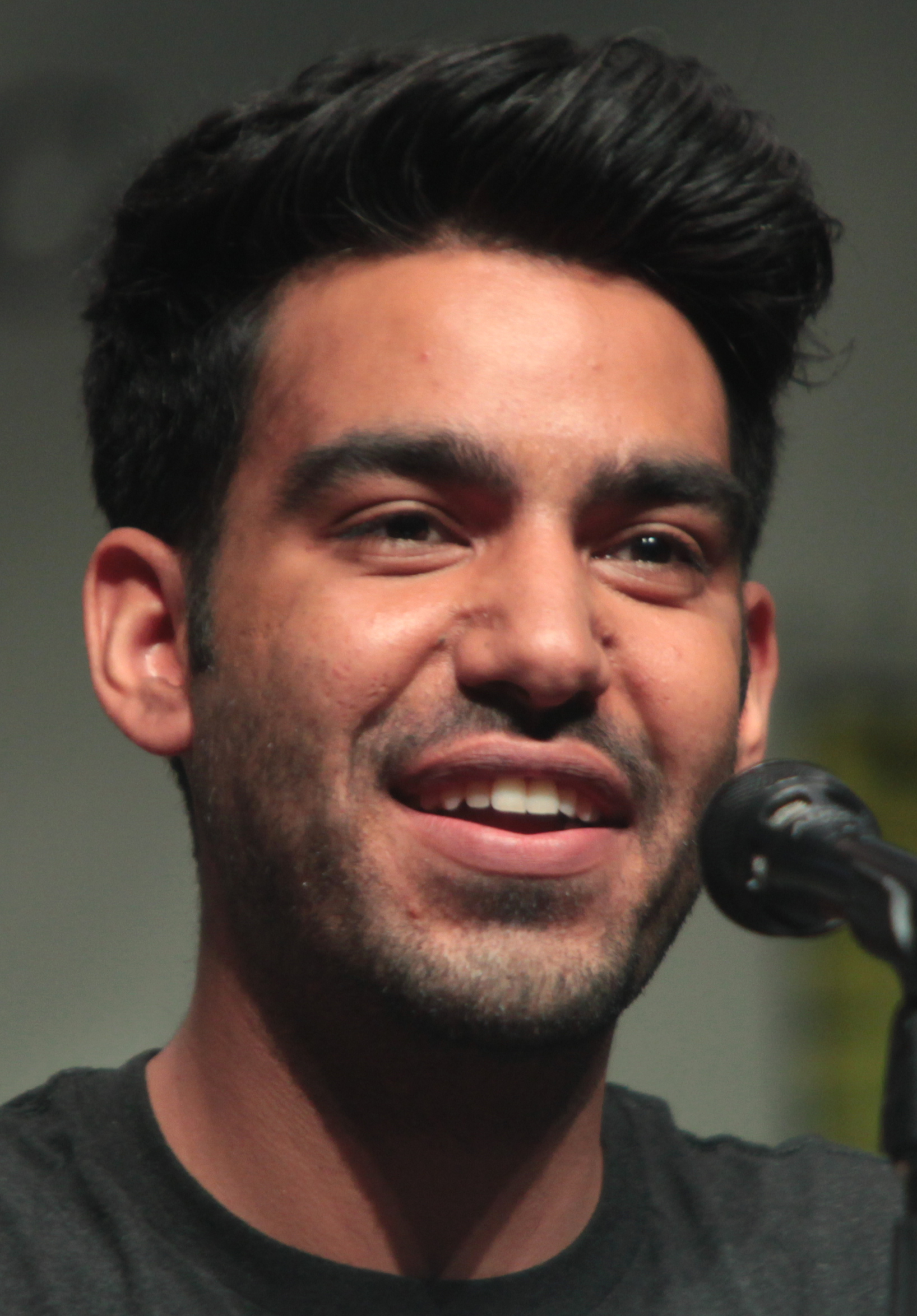
Rahul Kohli

Ravi Chakrabarti (portrayed by Rahul Kohli) is a medical examiner, Liv's best friend and boss, and Major's eventual roommate. He knows Liv's secret and assists her whenever he can to protect as well as study her, expressing an interest in finding a cure for her condition. He used to work for the Centers for Disease Control and Prevention but was fired for his obsession with preparing for an attack with biological weapons. The character has romantic feelings for Liv's best friend Peyton, whom he dated briefly in the first season.

In the third-season finale, Ravi tests a vaccine for the zombie virus on himself; for which he asks Liv to scratch him. Discussing the character's future, Kohli stated "I love playing the human dynamic, it's what the audience can connect with. However, it's tempting [to want to play a zombie.]"

In the fourth-season premiere it is revealed that the vaccine was not completely effective, and that Ravi suffers from periodic flare-ups during which he temporarily becomes a zombie for a few days before reverting into a human. He also gets back together with Peyton, expressing their love for each other.

==== Major Lilywhite ====
Major Lillywhite
- iZombie character
- First appearance: "Pilot" (2015)
- Last appearance: "All's Well That Ends Well" (2019)
- Created by: Rob Thomas; Diane Ruggiero-Wright
- Based on: Horatio by: Chris Roberson; Michael Allred
- Portrayed by: Robert Buckley

In-universe information
- Alias: The Chaos Killer
- Species: Zombie; Human (formerly)
- Occupation: Social worker; Personal trainer; Hit-Man for Max Rager; Soldier at Fillmore Graves; Commander at Fillmore Graves
- Family: Sue (mother); Dalia (step-mother)
- Spouse: Liv Moore (wife)
- Significant others: Corinne (ex-girlfriend); Rita Du Clark (ex-lover); Shawna (ex-girlfriend); Natalie (ex-girlfriend)
- Children: Unnamed adoptive children

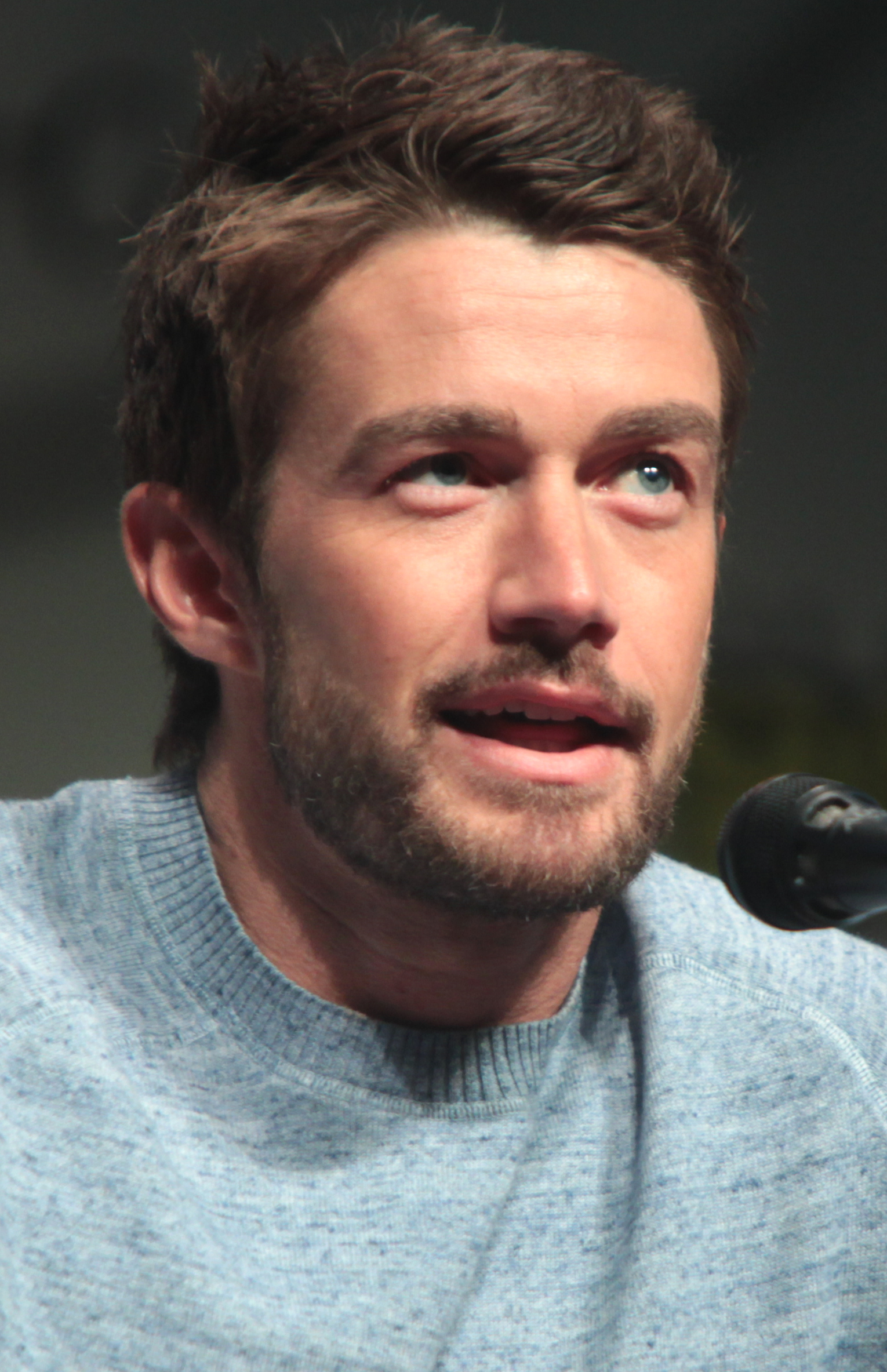
Robert Buckley

Major Lilywhite (portrayed by Robert Buckley) is Liv's ex-fiancé (she had ended their engagement to prevent him from becoming "infected" by her condition). Like Liv, he is a University of Washington alumnus; he is employed as a social worker at the local teen center, Helton Shelter. After several teenagers disappear at the local skate park, Major connects those disappearances to "The Candyman," one of Blaine's utopium dealers, and then to Blaine himself.

Despite being deluded into committing himself to an asylum for a week after multiple confrontations with the "Candyman," he continues his investigation after his release—having gained fresh evidence while inside.

Next, Major connects Blaine to a "charcuterie" that serves as a front for "brain-cuisine," and soon after learns of the zombie epidemic. In the first season's finale, after being discovered and held prisoner, he kills Blaine's zombified staff before being stabbed by Blaine himself. To save Major's life, Liv then turns him into a zombie. She later cures him, after which he tells her he would've preferred to be left to die.

In the second season, he is blackmailed into becoming a zombie hunter for Max Rager, as the company attempts to cover up both their own responsibility for the outbreak, and the existence of zombies themselves. While he is named the "Chaos Killer" by the press, Major secretly defies MR orders, and freezes his targets toward their potential future cure. He eventually reverts to zombie form at the end of the second season, learning that his cure had only been temporary.

After FBI Special Agent Dale Bozzio identifies Major as the "Chaos Killer", Liv is forced to tell Clive about the existence of zombies, to get Major out of prison. But the relief is only short lived, we find, as Vaughn Du Clark has discovered Major's treachery; and has abducted the zombies Major had frozen.

In the third season, Major becomes a pariah in spite of being acquitted at trial. This leads him to seek employment and acceptance with Fillmore-Graves Enterprises. He is next cured again, and is human once more; although he feigns being a zombie so that he can remain with Fillmore-Graves.

Though his ruse is eventually discovered, he volunteers to become a zombie again in the third-season finale, after his peers and his girlfriend Natalie are killed by Harley Johns. This leads to Major's break with humanity, and his siding against them along with Fillmore-Graves in the "New World Order." He later proves his loyalty to them by killing a mob of anti-zombie humans at the company's behest although he seems to take no pleasure in doing so.

By the end of the fourth season, Major becomes Chase's right-hand man and leads a squadron of soldiers composed of teenage zombies. Major briefly rekindles his relationship with Liv until they split again over disagreements with Renegade's operation, calling Liv out for self-righteousness over her belief of the other zombies' lack of morality. He succeeds Chase Graves as the commander of Fillmore-Graves after killing Chase to save Liv. After the United States cease their shipment of brains to New Seattle, Major makes a partnership with Blaine, whom he offers debt relief and a full pardon, offering a chance to become a hero to zombiekind in exchange for supplying brains.

==== Blaine "DeBeers" McDonough ====
Blaine "DeBeers" McDonough
- iZombie character
- First appearance: "Pilot" (2015)
- Last appearance: "All's Well That Ends Well" (2019)
- Created by: Rob Thomas; Diane Ruggiero-Wright
- Based on: John Amon by: Chris Roberson; Michael Allred
- Portrayed by: David Anders

In-universe information
- Aliases: Blaine DeBeers; John Deaux; Chinatown
- Species: Zombie; Human (formerly)
- Occupation: Drug dealer; Owner of Meat Cute; Brain dealer; Pimp; Owner of Shady Plots; Lounge singer; Owner of the Scratching Post; Owner of Romero’s
- Family: Angus McDonough (father)
- Significant others: Peyton Charles (ex-girlfriend); Alice “Al” Bronson (ex-crush)

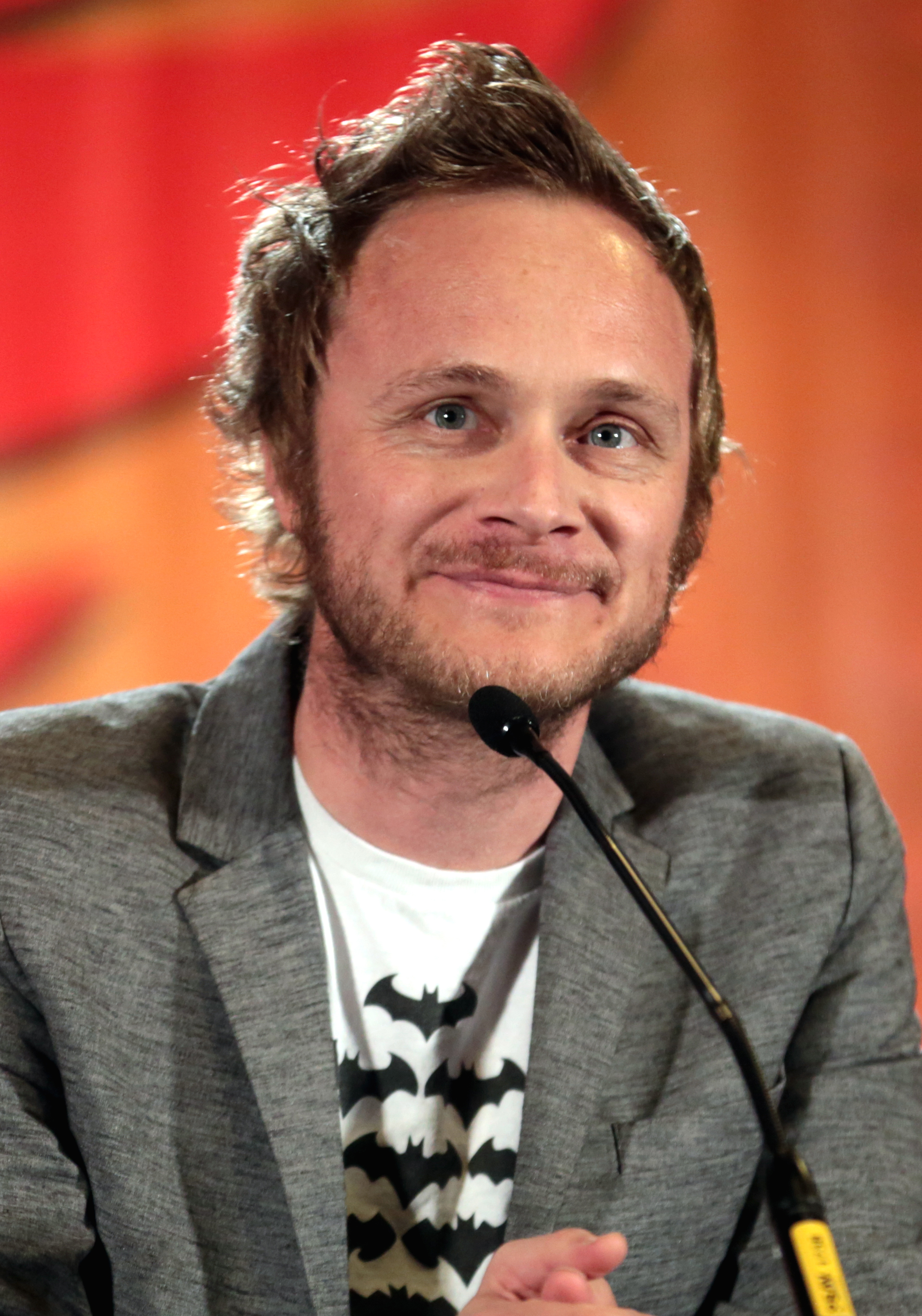
David Anders

Blaine McDonough (portrayed by David Anders), commonly known by the pseudonym Blaine DeBeers, is a drug dealer-turned-zombie who dealt a tainted version of the experimental drug, Utopium, which helped cause the zombie outbreak. Blaine was incidentally turned into a zombie by Liv when she threw her Max Rager drink in his face, after he attempted to grope her while high on the Utopium. The chemical mixture of the drink and drug were later confirmed in the second-season finale to be what originated the zombie outbreak. While in full-on zombie mode at the boat party, he scratched her, turning her into a zombie in turn.

Although he comes from a wealthy family, Blaine did not have a happy childhood; his depressed mother committed suicide, his doting grandfather was committed to hospice, and Blaine himself was abused by his nanny. As an adult, his father Angus considers him "a disappointment" after giving him money for failed businesses. According to Angus, he attended Wharton, though did not last a full semester. After some point Angus cut him off financially, leading Blaine to pursue work dealing drugs for Stacey Boss.

In the first season, Blaine initially claimed to Liv that he resorts to grave-robbing to access brains, but in reality he has set up a new "drug ring" whose customers are other zombies and product is the brains of murdered local homeless teens. His base of operations in the first season is a local butcher shop from which he runs a home delivery service of gourmet prepared brain meals for wealthy zombie customers. In keeping with his drug-dealer approach, he has been shown attacking his former criminal associates and rivals, and creating new zombies to drive up demand. It is revealed in the second season that his father was his first client, and Blaine extorted him into bankrolling his endeavors once more.

In the second season, after being cured, he moves his brains business to a funeral home—no longer murdering for his product supply. Desiring to become Seattle's new kingpin; he strong arms his client and district attorney Floyd Baracus to pursue a case against crime lord Stacey Boss, Blaine's former employer. In exchange for his testimonies Blaine receives immunity for his (known) crimes, and grows close to Peyton who was assigned the case. The two sleep together before she learns of his true nature from Liv, after he is accused by Clive and Bozzio of being the Chaos Killer. Not long after, Blaine eventually reverts to a zombie state before injecting himself with another attempt at a cure; after which he becomes an amnesiac.

After this status quo carries into the third season, it is revealed the amnesia was only temporary and that the character feigned memory loss in an attempt to change his life and how people viewed him, in the process finding a fresh start and happiness with Peyton. Shot by one of his father's henchmen, Blaine has a client turn him back into a zombie, and then kidnaps Angus and takes over his business. Despite their relationship returning to it is antagonistic roots, Blaine later helps Liv and Clive in an investigation. With the existence of zombies made public knowledge in the third-season finale, Blaine found himself a somewhat legitimate businessman. Having already stopped killing for his brain supply and intentionally creating more zombies; the zombie outbreak forces him to change his business model. With Fillmore-Graves offering brain tubes to the public, he no longer is able to extort his existing clientele for their food supply. Instead, he capitalizes on the rarity of "whole brains" to draw in a larger client base.

Following this, showrunner Rob Thomas implied about the fourth season: "We keep calling [Blaine] Rick from Casablanca. He is the man who can get things. He is going to profit from this new world. He is going to run the black market. Blaine is going to open a new restaurant. He is going to be doing very well." This holds true as Blaine continues to feed Seattle's zombies during the starvation crisis, and does under the table work for Chase Graves. However, the character largely returns to his villainous roots; being revealed as the thief who stole the zombie cure and killing Floyd Baracus to display it is effectiveness before auctioning it off. Blaine also plans to spread the zombie virus throughout the country, in an effort to gain a monopoly on real estate. He also contests with the return of Angus, who had been driven mad in the well and becomes an evangelical zombie cult leader who wishes to make amends with his son.

In the fourth-season finale, he is given a full pardon by Major and becomes the sole brain provider for New Seattle, with his debts waived and the opportunity to become a hero to zombiekind.

The character has often been compared to Spike from the Buffy the Vampire Slayer mythos. Coincidentally, Anders consulted Spike's portrayer, James Marsters, prior to bleaching his hair for the role. Show co-creator Diane Ruggiero-Wright stated prior to the series finale that there were once plans to redeem the character, who acted as the series’ wild card, but they ultimately fell through.

==== Peyton Charles ====
Peyton Charles
- iZombie character
- First appearance: "Pilot" (2015)
- Last appearance: "All's Well That Ends Well" (2019)
- Created by: Rob Thomas; Diane Ruggiero-Wright
- Based on: Ellie Stuart by: Chris Roberson; Michael Allred
- Portrayed by: Aly Michalka

In-universe information
- Species: Human
- Occupation: Assistant district attorney of Seattle; Chief of staff for Floyd Baracus; Interim Mayor of Seattle; District attorney of Atlanta
- Spouse: Ravi Chakrabarti (husband)
- Significant others: Blaine McDonough (ex-boyfriend); Derek Edelsberg (ex-boyfriend)

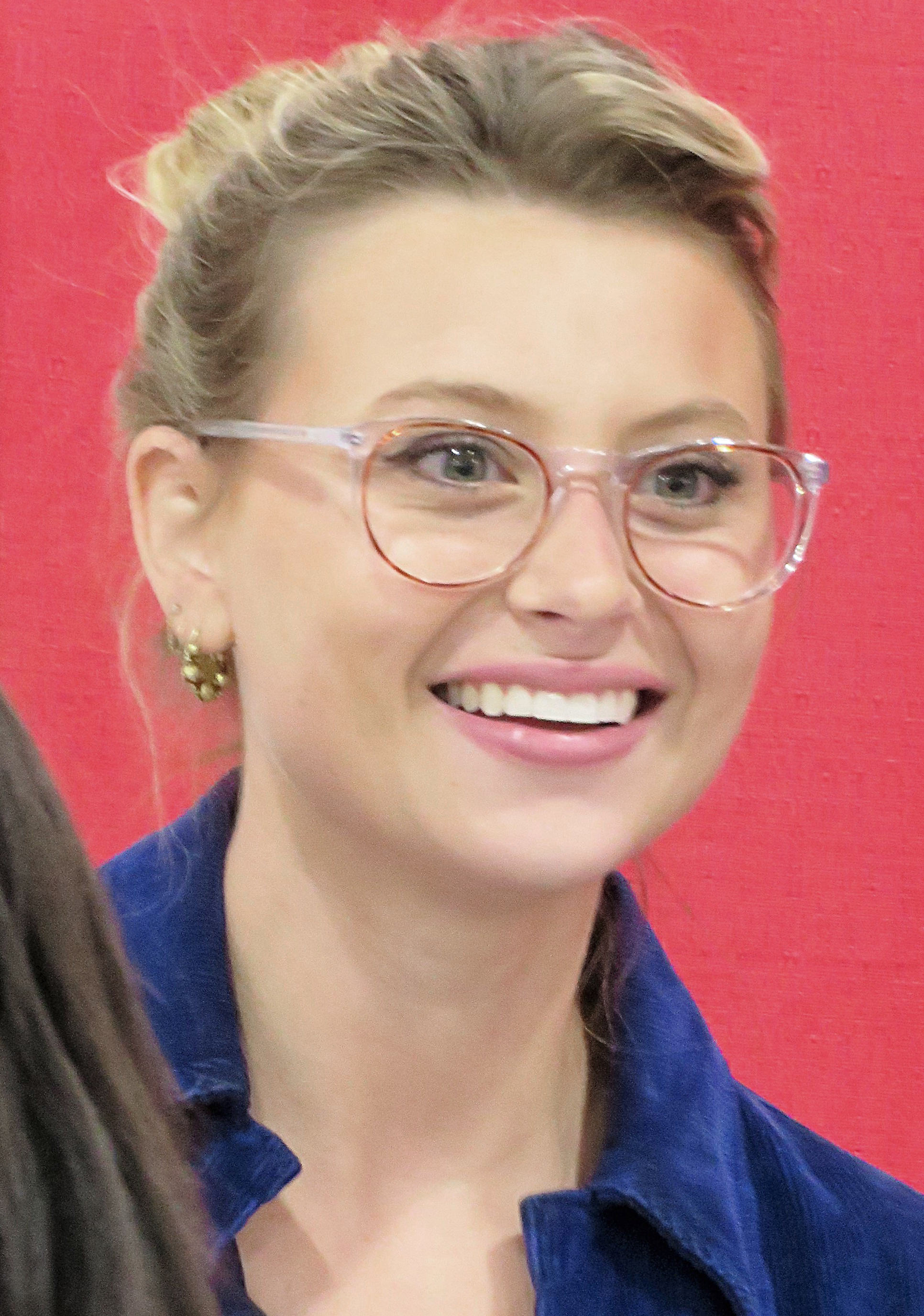
Michalka was promoted to series regular starting with the third season, having recurred in the first two.

Peyton Charles (portrayed by Aly Michalka) is Liv's best friend and roommate, who expresses concern about Liv's declining interest in life after the boat party. She also works as an assistant district attorney for the King County Prosecuting Attorney's Office. Peyton learns of Liv's secret at the end of the first season, prompting her to leave Seattle.

Peyton returns in the second season, reconciling with Liv and being appointed head of the task force against Utopium. While making a case against crime lord Stacey Boss, she grew close to Blaine and slept with him before learning that he turned Liv into a zombie.

Though a recurring character in the first two seasons, she is promoted to a series regular with the third season, at which point her professional and personal lives are highlighted. Peyton had a relationship with Ravi during the first season, which was briefly rekindled at the end of the second season. After visiting him to clear the air following a disagreement involving Blaine, the two share a kiss, with Peyton realizing Ravi had a one-night stand with Katty Kupps; who was still present in his home. She then initiates a relationship with the seemingly reformed Blaine, which deteriorates upon the revelation he feigned the true duration of his memory loss. She also uncovers a conspiracy that implicates her employer, Floyd Baracus, in a number of suspicious deaths. After he is proven innocent, Peyton accepts a position as his chief of staff.

Teasing her role in the fourth season, Rob Thomas stated: "She'll have her fingers in a couple of pies next season. Half of the prosecutors working in Seattle escaped the city before the wall went up, and Peyton will get called in on occasion to fill in when the case load becomes such that they need an extra hand. Working the mayor's office, she will be on the front line of mediating disputes between zombies and humans. Turns out humans don't want their children going to school with zombies, or sharing restrooms, or sharing city parks. There is a lot of work to be done."

==== Angus McDonough ====
Angus McDonough
- iZombie character
- First appearance: "Zombie Bro" (2015)
- Last appearance: "And He Shall Be a Good Man" (2018)
- Created by: Diane Ruggiero-Wright
- Portrayed by: Robert Knepper

In-universe information
- Alias: Brother Love
- Species: Human (formerly); Zombie
- Occupation: Real estate tycoon; Cult leader
- Children: Blaine McDonough (son)

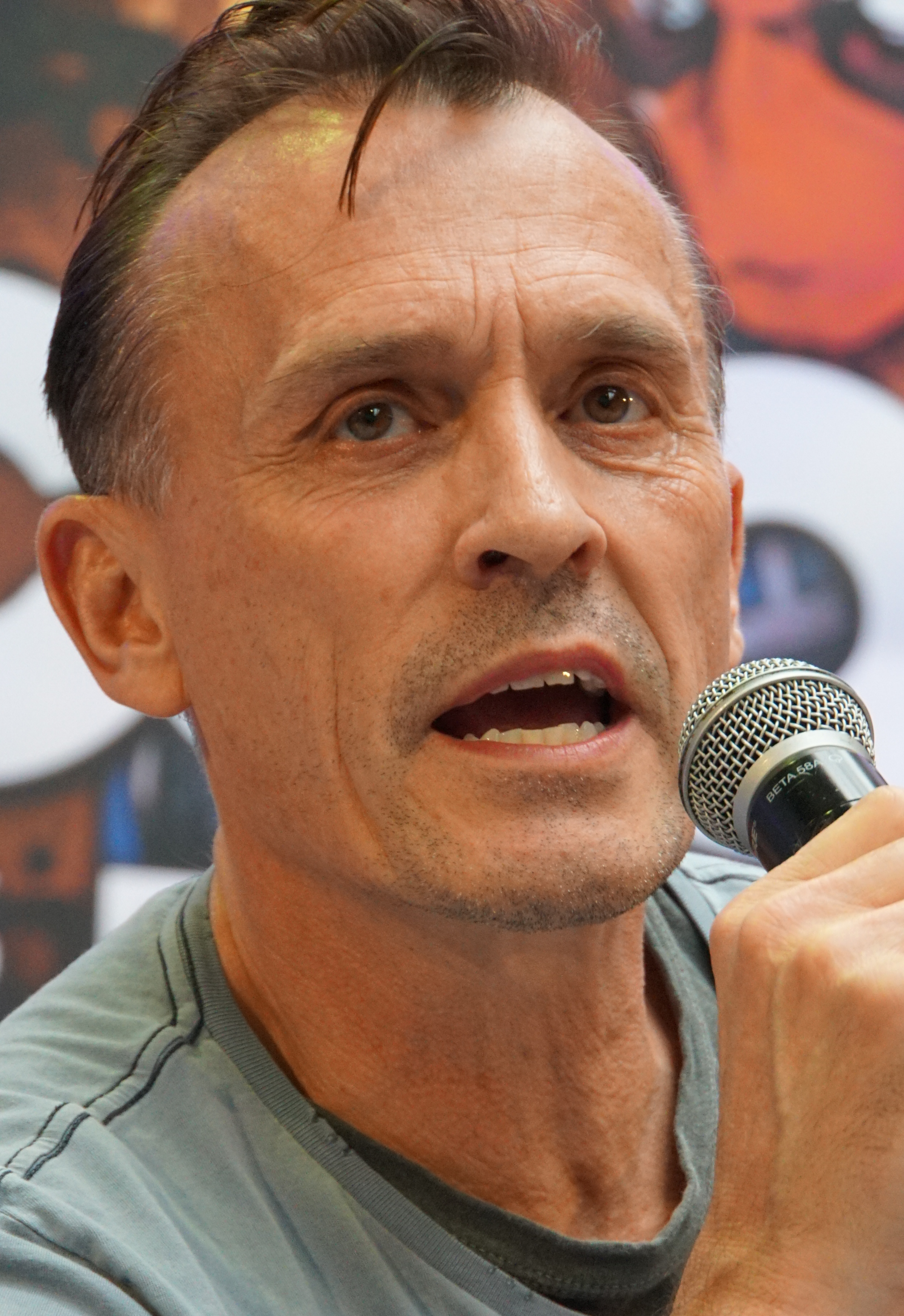
Having recurred in both the second and third seasons, it was announced Knepper would be promoted to series regular for the fourth.

Angus McDonough (portrayed by Robert Knepper) is Blaine's estranged and abusive father whom he turned into a zombie, and who tried to force Blaine to work for him prior to becoming one of Major's Chaos Killer victims. After discovering Major's role in his father's disappearance, Blaine negotiated for Angus' return so that he could force him to amend his will. Upon his father's disappearance, Blaine learned Angus added a stipulation that his estate would be left to Blaine's abusive childhood nanny were his death to result from foul play.

In the third season, he is freed by Don E., whom he forms an alliance with in order to get revenge upon his son. Establishing their own brain dealing business, Angus finances the new zombie club, the Scratching Post. Prior to seizing Blaine's client base, Angus commands Don to increase the zombie population in order to attract new and wealthy clients. After he learns the nature of Fillmore-Graves, Angus develops a plan (later adopted and amended by Blaine) to partner with them for "global brain distribution". After Blaine survives a hit Angus orders, the former traps the latter in a well on their family estate and usurps his business. He is later shown to visit him to gloat and bring him brains; lest he become a mindless "Romero" zombie.

After recurring in three episodes each in both the second and third season, it was announced the character would be promoted to the main cast with the fourth season. In regards to the announcement, Rob Thomas stated, "Angus is going to get out of the well, and he is going to be up to no good, and he is going to have some very hardcore pro-zombie people on his side. There's going to be a human terrorist organization that doesn't want any human-zombie fraternization. This is not about one big bad this year. It's coming at our characters from all sides of the spectrum."

When the character returns as a regular in the fourth season, he is freed by a resentful Dino and is revealed to have gone insane during his imprisonment. As such, he believes the words he heard from Blaine while in the well were the words of God, and becomes a religious cult leader known as "Brother Love", preaching pro-zombie/anti-human sentiment.

Though he attempts to make amends with his son, the relationship deteriorates upon Angus learning that Blaine manipulated him. Stating that his son was dead to him, Angus led his cult in an effort to escape the city before ultimately being executed by the United States military.

==== Don "Don E." Eberhard ====
Don "Don E."Eberhard
- iZombie character
- First appearance: "Grumpy Old Liv" (2015)
- Last appearance: "All's Well That Ends Well" (2019)
- Created by: Rob Thomas
- Portrayed by: Bryce Hodgson

In-universe information
- Full name: Donald Eberhard
- Alias: Don E.
- Species: Zombie; Human (formerly)
- Occupation: Manager at the Scratching Post; Brain dealer
- Family: Scott Eberhard (twin brother); “Mom E.” (mother)

Donald "Don E." Eberhard (portrayed by Bryce Hodgson) is a drug dealer and associate of Blaine who helps him track down boat party Utopium for Ravi's cure, while also assisting him in his professional and criminal endeavors. The character voluntarily becomes a zombie and briefly takes over Blaine's business once he becomes an amnesiac. In the third season, the character briefly abandons Blaine to form an alliance with his father to open the zombies-only club, the Scratching Post, before later reconciling with Blaine himself when the latter usurps the former. Along with Blaine, he is given a full pardon at the end of the fourth season in exchange for supplying New Seattle with brains. Hodgson also portrayed the character's late twin brother, "Scott E." in two episodes of the first season. The character was promoted to the main cast for the fifth and final season.

=== Supporting characters ===
==== Introduced in season one ====
- Eva Moore (portrayed by Molly Hagan, recurring season 1, 5; guest season 2): Liv's mother, who often attempts to encourage Liv to get over what Eva thinks is "PTSD" from the boat party. Eva works as a hospital administrator. After Liv refuses to give her brother a blood transfusion, Eva disowns her daughter and forbids Liv from making contact with her brother.
- Evan Moore (portrayed by Nick Purcha, recurring season 1; guest seasons 2, 5): Liv's brother. Hired by Blaine as a delivery boy, he is injured in Suzuki's suicide bombing. Liv's refusal to give him blood leads to her family disowning her. Though he refused his sister's visit in the second-season premiere, the character was meant to return later in the second season, where Liv would have confessed she was a zombie and Evan would have come out to her in turn. Though the scene was cut and its canonical status is uncertain, it can be seen on the second season home video releases.
- Marcy Khan (portrayed by Aliza Vellani, season 1): A coworker of Liv during her time as a medical resident, and the one who invited her to the boat party where the initial zombie outbreak took place. Liv initially believed Marcy disliked her and considered her a rival, and initially declined the invitation prior to being encouraged to attend by Major. Two episodes later it is revealed she was turned into a zombie at some point during the party, when she is found months later by Liv and Ravi. Having been deprived of brains, she regressed to a mindless Romero-type zombie. After she nearly attacks Ravi, Liv is forced to put her down to save him. She later anonymously delivers the necklace Marcy had been wearing to her mother, in hopes it would provide her family with closure.
- Julien Dupont (portrayed by Aleks Paunovic, season 1): Also called the Candyman and known as Julien "DeWeed"; a zombie thug who works for Blaine and who grows to hold personal animosity towards Major, who eventually kills him during the Meat Cute massacre.
- Lowell Tracey (portrayed by Bradley James, season 1): A musician, fellow zombie, and one of Blaine's clients who entered a relationship with Liv in the first season. After learning how Blaine was obtaining the brains for his business, Lowell and Liv initially devised a plan to kill him. Upon Liv realizing she could not go through with it; Lowell took it upon himself to make a failed attempt on Blaine's life, one which resulted in his own death.
- Daniel Suzuki (portrayed by Hiro Kanagawa, recurring season 1; guest season 4): Babineaux's senior officer who is secretly a zombie in Blaine's employ to hinder the murder investigations of his victims. When the victims' abductions get too much attention, he starts to worry about being discovered. After arriving to the aftermath of Major's massacre of Blaine's staff, Suzuki commits suicide by causing an explosion at the crime scene. He has a cameo in the fourth season as part of Mama Leone's flashbacks to her origin.
- Vaughn Du Clark (portrayed by Steven Weber, recurring seasons 1–2): The scheming and power-crazed CEO of Max Rager, an energy drink company that is under investigation for their product inducing aggressive behavior. In the second season, he tries to cover up his company's role in the zombie outbreak; forcing Major to hunt zombies while also subjecting them to experiments. He is killed by a horde of zombies, his daughter Rita, after Major traps him in an elevator during the Max Rager massacre.
- Rita Du Clark (portrayed by Leanne Lapp, guest season 1; recurring season 2): Vaughn's manipulative scheming daughter who also serves as his personal assistant. While tasked with spying on Liv, she poses as her roommate "Gilda". She is eventually turned into a zombie after her father abandons her to the mercy of escaped Romero zombies in the Max Rager lab, before she herself is captured and imprisoned in the laboratory. She turns against her father in the second-season finale, aiding Liv, Major, and Clive in an attempt to gain her own freedom. After killing her father and nearly attacking Clive and Liv while in "Full-On Zombie Mode," she is killed by Major (with whom she had engaged in a brief sexual relationship earlier in the season).
- Sebastian Meyer, (portrayed by Matthew MacCaull, season 1): A hitman in the employ of Max Rager who is ordered to silence Liv when she investigates the company. She eventually kills him in self-defense, but not before inadvertently turning him into a zombie; thus revealing the existence of zombies to Vaughn Du Clark.
- Johnny Frost (portrayed by Daran Norris, recurring seasons 1, 3–5; guest season 2): A local weatherman whose affinity for call girls and strippers result in him occasionally being involved in Liv and Clive's investigations. By the third season, the character is promoted to news anchor, and in the third-season finale, he is turned into a zombie by the machinations of Fillmore-Graves. After being approached and reassured by Liv, the character deviates from his comedic and buffoonish persona; breaking the existence of zombies to the public via his newscast with solemn earnestness. In the fourth season, Frost capitalizes on his new zombie status via his own talk show, entitled "Frostbite".
- Candy Baker (portrayed by Carrie Anne Fleming, guest season 1; recurring seasons 2–5): Initially the host for trivia night at a bar frequented by Seattle's police officers, Candy later becomes a makeup artist in Blaine's employ at Shady Plots. She seems to have a bit of a crush on him, and was accidentally turned into a zombie after the two had a one-night stand. As Blaine mourns the end of his relationship with Peyton, a bitter Candy briefly abandons him to align herself with Don E.; though Blaine later makes peace with the both of them. When Stacey Boss returns to Seattle hoping to kill Blaine, Candy comes to the latter's aide; inadvertently revealing the existence of zombies to the former.
- Lieutenant Devore (portrayed by Marci T. House, guest season 1; recurring seasons 2–3): Originally a detective in vice, she was Clive Babineaux's former partner. After Lieutenant Suzuki's death, she was transferred to homicide, where she became his superior.
- Jackie (portrayed by Sarah-Jane Redmond, season 1): A wealthy, trendsetting, divorcee whom Blaine picks up in a bar and infects with the zombie virus. In spite of this, she remains rather fond of him; the two engage in a casual sexual relationship and Jackie alerts him to the fact two of his employees aim to break off and form their own brain dealing business. After Clive investigates the death of a delivery boy whom she accidentally killed while in full on zombie mode; Blaine comes to see her as a liability and "puts her down" upon arriving to cover up the murder. The death of the aforementioned delivery boy she killed later provides an opening at Meat Cute, for which Liv's brother Evan applies.
- Corinne (portrayed by Elise Gatien, season 1): A Stanford graduate whom Major dates for several episodes, until she breaks up with him due to his obsessive preoccupation with investigating Julien Dupont. Her presence helps reaffirm Liv and Peyton's friendship after the boat party. She is also indirectly responsible for Major seeking a new roommate, which led Liv to introduce him to Ravi.
- Jimmy Hahn (portrayed by Ryan Beil, recurring seasons 1, 3–4; guest season 2): A sketch artist within the Seattle Police Department that harbors animosity, and later unrequited feelings, towards Liv. Initially recruited by Ravi in an attempt to help Liv identify Blaine, he occasionally is called in to help Liv and Clive with their investigations.
- Luta (portrayed by Darryl Quon, season 1): An employee of Blaine's at Meat Cute whose slip-up helps Major confirm the truth about zombies. He is later killed by Major in the Meat Cute massacre.
- Cissie (portrayed by Tanja Dixon-Warren, season 1): A chef in Blaine's employ who is later killed by Major in the Meat Cute Massacre.
- Tommy (portrayed by Dakota Daulby, season 1): A Helton shelter teen who helps Major track down the Candyman after the disappearance of his friend Jerome. Major later discovers his corpse in the Meat Cute freezer and dead from a meathook, and uses his lighter to help him break out.
- Cameron Henley (portrayed by Rhys Ward, season 1): A musician who ran over the undead Sebastian Meyer and buried him in the woods. When Sebastian proved to be still alive, Max Rager attempted to buy his silence. Cameron in turn murderer his friends in the hopes of keeping the hush money to himself. He attempted to frame Max Rager for the killings, and his own kidnapping, before being caught by Liv and Clive.
- Teresa Giovanni (portrayed by Bex Taylor-Klaus, season 1): Cameron Henley's friend and bandmate who was with him when he ran over Sebastian Meyer. Teresa was killed by Cameron in the hopes of keeping a larger sum of hush money, but not before she tipped off Clive to her suspicion that it was Max Rager who was killing her friends.
- Bryce Buellton (portrayed by Rob Carpenter, recurring season 1; guest season 2): A criminal who sold unregistered weapons out of the trunk of his car. He sold Major the guns he used in the Meat Cute massacre, and later hoped to testify during Major's Chaos Killer trial in the hopes of receiving a lighter sentence.
- Anthony "AJ" Jin (portrayed by Tim Chiou, guest seasons 1, 3, 4): The leader of Seattle's Asian gang, the Blue Cobras. After an undercover Clive attempted to infiltrate his inner circle, AJ himself sought out Liv to seek vengeance after learning she helped put away his crew. AJ is notable for having seen Liv in full-on zombie mode prior to zombies being common knowledge, as she desperately tried to end the fight before her brother could happen upon the scene. Despite AJ's claims of what he saw, no one believes him and he is taken into custody. In the second season, he is mentioned by Blaine to Peyton as they form their case against Mr. Boss, and it is revealed AJ and his father Jiang were responsible for overseeing Mr. Boss' Utopium shipments from Hong Kong. AJ later returns in the third season, where he is given a deal for a lighter sentence in exchange for identifying James Weckler's killer. In the fourth season he is on parole as a result of the aforementioned deal, and an initial suspect in the murder of Detective Benedetto. He is ultimately revealed as Russ Roche's employer, controlling the black market supply of brain tubes.
- Chuck Burd (portrayed by Aaron Douglas, guest seasons 1, 3): A radio shock jock who values ratings over ethics. He is the first to question the cover story for the Max Rager massacre, and in spite of the attempted intervention of Liv and Clive, interviews Billy Cook on air as to what he witnessed. Mr. Huntsman was mentioned to be an avid listener of Bird's show, and called in to state his belief that his neighbors were zombies; and that they existed beyond Max Rager.
- Donald Thorne (portrayed by Serge Houde, guest seasons 1–3): A high-priced lawyer and rival of Peyton's who represented Don Watts, Terrence Fowler and James Weckler.

==== Introduced in season two ====
- Dallas Anne "Dale" Bozzio (portrayed by Jessica Harmon, recurring seasons 2–5): An FBI agent who begins a relationship with Clive after being assigned to the "Chaos Killer" case. She eventually leaves him after he drops murder charges against Major after Clive finds out he is a zombie and he is unable to give an explanation. Clive reveals the truth about zombies to her in the third-season finale, when she arrests his CI Tanner, a zombie in Blaine's employ. Though she and Clive reconcile, she herself is turned into a zombie due to the machinations of Fillmore-Graves. In the fourth-season finale, she marries Clive, and is cured by Liv using Isobel's brain. She is named for the musician of the same name.
- Stacey Boss (portrayed by Eddie Jemison, recurring seasons 2–3, 5; guest season 4): Boss controls the majority of the city's organised crime, and is the ultimate target of Peyton's "Utopium Task Force". After the disbanding of the UTF, he attempts to kill Blaine, known to Boss's employees as "Chinatown," for leaving his employ without permission. After the failed kidnapping of Peyton and the police confiscation of his files (second-season finale) he flees to Montenegro, yet briefly returns to seek revenge on Blaine—at which point he learns the truth about zombies, and is intimidated into working for Blaine. He returns once more in the fourth season, requesting Blaine's help tracking down a stockpile of dirty money. Though the two manipulate Angus' cult into aiding them, they are unable to obtain the money before Peyton turns it over to Liv to aide in her Renegade activities.
- Drake Holloway (portrayed by Greg Finley, recurring season 2; guest season 3): Initially presented as a drug dealer acquaintance of Don E. and Blaine, the character becomes Blaine's mole in Mr. Boss' organization. He is turned into a zombie by/pursues a relationship with Liv, and is ultimately revealed to be an undercover Seattle police officer who infiltrated Boss's organization. After he is kidnapped by Major, Vaughn experiments on him; he becomes a "Romero" and Liv is forced to kill him in order to both save Clive and prevent him from an eternity in his new state. In the third season Liv hallucinates him as a result of consuming James Weckler's brain, during which time she comes to make peace with his death.
- Chief (portrayed by Andre Tricoteux, recurring season 2; guest season 3): A mute zombie in Blaine's employ, the character forms a friendship with Don E. and eventually turns him into a zombie at his request. After being shot through the neck, mouth, and eye by one of Angus' henchman, he dons a distinctive eyepatch until he is shot once more—this time fatally—by one of Boss's henchmen. His corpse appears in the third-season premiere, when Don E. discovers Angus frozen in Shady Plots' cooler.
- Floyd Baracus (portrayed by Kurt Evans, recurring seasons 2–4): Initially the King County District Attorney and later the Mayor, Baracus is Peyton's boss. He was turned into a zombie by Blaine, who pressures him into making a case against Mr. Boss. Baracus assigns Peyton to the case before he finding himself as one of the zombies Major is forced to kidnap for Max Rager. In the third season, he campaigns to become Mayor, with the backing of Fillmore-Graves. Though he is eventually elected, Liv and Peyton uncover a conspiracy implicating him in numerous murders. In the third-season finale, it is revealed he himself is innocent, and the murders were conducted by Fillmore-Graves to ensure the election of a zombie mayor. Towards the end of the fourth season, he is cured and killed by Blaine in an effort to prove the zombie cure's validity to potential bidders on the dark web. The character's name (as he is usually referred to as DA Baracus) is a reference to The A-Team character B. A. Baracus.
- Cavanaugh (portrayed by Robert Salvador, recurring seasons 2–5): A laid back colleague of Clive's within the Seattle Police Department. Friction between the two developed in the third season, as Clive interfered with a murder investigation Cavanaugh was leading; as he knew the victims, and (unknown to Cavanaugh) it appeared to be a hate crime against zombies. In the fourth season, he is assigned as Bozzio's partner, and reveals to Clive the reason she broke up with him, leading to Clive's proposal.
- Harris (portrayed by Cole Vigue, recurring seasons 2–4): A beat cop and colleague of Clive and Cavanaugh's within the Seattle Police Department.
- Vivian Stoll (portrayed by Andrea Savage, recurring seasons 2–3): The CEO of the paramilitary organization Fillmore-Graves. After purchasing the Max Rager company, it is revealed that Vivian and her employees are zombies. The character was seemingly killed in a helicopter crash midway through the third season. Her role at Fillmore-Graves is then filled by her brother-in-law, Chase Graves. Savage's abrupt departure from the series was a result of her commitment to I'm Sorry, a series which she both created and stars in. When asked if there was potential for her to return to the show, given that the no body was found and the character was not seen boarding the helicopter in question, Savage stated; "Sadly, I doubt it. I know that is not what you wanted to hear. Sorry!"
- Janko (portrayed by Colin Lawrence, recurring season 2): Vaughn Du Clark's enforcer/bodyguard, and a former Iraq war torture master. When he comes to the morgue to kill Liv, Ravi fights with him and kills him in self-defense. Liv and Major consume his brains for a cool disposition when infiltrating Max Rager's SuperMax launch party.
- Tanner (portrayed by Nathan Barrett, recurring seasons 2–4; recurring season 5): A Utopium dealer who is one of Clive's C.I.'s and was once mentored by Major at Helton Shelter. Though initially a tertiary character, Tanner is a recurring presence in the third season. Becoming a zombie courtesy/at the behest of Don E., he becomes Don E's assistant at the Scratching Post. It is because of him that Clive is forced to reveal the existence of zombies to Bozzio, as she captured him receiving a shipment of brains.
- Jeremy Chu (portrayed by Patrick Gallagher, recurring season 2; guest season 3): A reporter and client of Blaine's. He writes articles at Blaine's behest that result in Baracus assigning Peyton to the Stacey Boss case, and that convince Seattle's then-Mayor to refuse Peyton's resignation. He makes a brief return in the third season, where Blaine has him turn him back into a zombie after he is shot on his father's order.
- Natalie (portrayed by Brooke Lyons, guest season 2; recurring season 3): A call girl who Blaine zombified through sex, she is forced to accept an exclusively zombie clientele to maintain her brain supply. She strikes up a friendship with Major when he is sent to kill her at the behest of Max Rager, and ends up consciously frozen. Major expects to find and liberate her during the Super Max "Lockdown" party, but does not, and her whereabouts are a mystery. We later discover that she convinced Janko to sell her to a client by the name of Osborn Oates, who holds her prisoner as a sex slave. Though she claimed Oates would fine her wherever she went, after Major gives her a dose of the zombie "cure," she travels the world before returning to Seattle. Reaching out again to him. Despite previously saying she depleted her savings due to Blaine paying her in brains, she claims her savings from her former profession funded her travels, and she invites Major to move to Italy with her. Major agrees and the two become a couple, but she is inadvertently killed by anti-zombie leader Harley Johns in a suicide bombing. Her death, along with that of his colleagues, cause Major to become disillusioned, and he voluntarily becomes a zombie once more in order to rejoin Fillmore-Graves.
- Kenny (portrayed by Bradley Stryker, recurring season 2): Stacey Boss' right-hand man and enforcer, who holds animosity towards Blaine. Recalling the latter's attempt at instigating a police crackdown on the Blue Cobra gang, Kenny realizes that Blaine is the one moving in on Mr. Boss' utopium trade and abducts him from Shady Plots so that Boss can have him executed. When rival Utopium is still distributed in the wake of Blaine's death, Kenny storms Shady Plots and kills Chief before demanding answers. After learning that Blaine is alive, and in love with Peyton, Kenny kidnaps her on Boss' order to lure him into a final stand-off; in which he himself is killed.
- Howard (portrayed by Jason Simpson, recurring season 2): One of Mr. Boss' henchman, usually seem accompanying Kenny. Howard was killed by Blaine when he was rescuing a hostage Peyton.
- Lou Benedetto (portrayed by Enrico Colantoni, recurring season 2; guest season 4): A vice cop within the Seattle Police Department, and the officer overseeing Drake's undercover assignment. It is revealed he was running an unsanctioned informant program case in which he blackmailed his drug busts into endangering themselves in order to provide him with information on the Utopium drug war. He reappears briefly in the fourth season before being murdered, leading to Liv eating his brain.
- Brandt Stone (portrayed by Ken Marino, guest seasons 2–5): A lawyer employed by Max Rager to defend Major when he is on trial for his Chaos Killer activities. It is revealed Stone has had past dealings with Peyton, and has asked her out on numerous occasions; to which she consistently declined. The character returns in the third season, as a suspect (along with his client Johnny Frost, and Floyd Baracus) in the murder of a dominatrix.
- Gabriel (portrayed by Yani Gellman, recurring season 2): A drug dealer turned preacher and an associate of Don E., Gabriel cut the Utopium that Blaine dealt the night of the boat party. He is turned by Chief on Blaine's order, so that Ravi can analyze the drug in his research for a cure. He dies after injecting himself with what he thinks is a cure, and his death leads to the introduction of Drake, who had information in regards to a missing batch of tainted Utopium.
- Steph (portrayed by Debs Howard, recurring season 2): Ravi's girlfriend in the beginning of the second season. She is overly excitable, showing enthusiasm for meeting Peyton in addition to throwing Ravi a surprise Guy Fawkes Night party. Though he intends to break up with her, Ravi drunkenly sleeps with her before doing so the morning after. Though Steph bitterly departs, Ravi occupies himself by attempt to rekindle things with Peyton; something which she initially rebuffs.
- "Speedy" Pete (portrayed by Paul Anthony, recurring season 2): A former dealer for Stacey Boss who was recruited by Blaine to help establish his own drug empire, and act as a patsy to hide his involvement. Speedy was ordered by Blaine to enlist young men whose finances cut off by their wealthy families; in reality so that said dealers' at the hands of Mr. Boss' henchman gave Floyd Baracus enough cause to pursue a case against him at Blaine's urging. Once the dealers were killed, Blaine assured Speedy he would protect him, but instead let him be killed as he had outlived his usefulness.
- Brody Johnson (portrayed by Justin Prentice, recurring season 2): A college frat-boy whom Liv briefly befriended during a murder investigation. He returns later in the season as a suspect in another case where he is revealed to have become in charge of his university's student government (uncontested) in the wake of the victim's death.
- Roger Thrunk (portrayed by Jerry Trimble, recurring season 2): A corrupt lawyer who moonlights as a cleaner. Roger covered up Harry Cole's murder of a bookie's collection thug, during which he himself murdered of a security guard who witnessed him disposing of the body. Thrunk next appeared as a suspect when Harry himself was killed in the opening minutes of the very next episode. Although Thrunk had no involvement with Harry's murder and was released due to the loss of his testimony, Clive was able to convict him on unrelated drug charges.
- Harry Cole (portrayed by Ray Galletti, recurring season 2): A lawyer and gambling addict who killed a bookie's collection thug in self-defense, before hiring Roger Thrunk to dispose of the body. After Taking s plea deal, Cole was murdered in front of Clive in the opening minutes of the following episode. Ultimately Cole was revealed to have been murdered by hitmen hired by a former friend and basketball player whom he was blackmailing. Stacy Boss gave Liv input on the investigation, prior to her learning his identity.
- Telly Levins (portrayed by Julian Paul, recurring season 2): A thug for working for a bookie known as "the Barber", who was murdered by Harry Cole upon trying to collect his debts.
- Tim Addis (portrayed by Ted Cole, recurring season 2; guest season 3): One of the zombies kidnapped by Major during his Chaos Killer stint. Major incidentally discovered Addis was a zombie upon being hired as his personal trainer.
- Colin Andrews (portrayed by Antonio Cayonne, recurring season 2): A tech executive and zombie who was kidnapped by Major during his Chaos Killer stint. Andrews asked Major not to harm his dog and to take care of him; which led to the dog (named "Minor" by Ravi) being adopted by Major and Ravi for the remainder of the season. Major is forced to abandon Minor on a bus after Clive and Bozzio use the dog's microchip in a bid to track down Andrews' kidnapper, whom they correctly presume to be the Chaos Killer. After the dog is recovered, Major is identified by a dog groomer, leading to his arrest. Following his release at Max Rager, it is presumed Andrews was reunited with his dog.
- Regina Sumner (portrayed by Natasha Burnett, recurring season 2): An ex-girlfriend of Clive who is revealed to be stalking him, and who is murdered the following episode, prompting Liv to eat her brain.
- Pam (portrayed by Lola St. Vil, recurring season 2): A petty criminal whom Liv encounters in jail, and later appears as a murder suspect while on parole.
- Mrs. Holloway (portrayed by Miriam Flynn, recurring season 2): Drake's overbearing mother, she grows fond of Liv and is also the one to inform her he was an undercover cop upon his disappearance.
- Billy Cook (portrayed by Keith Dallas, guest season 2; recurring season 3): A guard at Max Rager who survives the massacre and recounts his experience on Chuck Burd's radio show. He eventually joins Harley Johns' anti-zombie group along with Mr. Huntsman. Unlike most of his cohorts; Billy shows a hesitancy to kidnap or harm zombies, simply wishing to make others aware of the threat. Billy is killed along with Huntsman by Harley after he is turned into a zombie.
- Rob Thomas (portrayed by himself, guest season 2): Playing a fictional version of himself, Thomas initially has a vocal cameo as he is employed by Vaughn Du Clark to write a song for Max Rager's SuperMax commercial. He then appears in person in the second-season finale, providing entertainment at the SuperMax launch party, before being killed in the ensuing massacre. Thomas' brain was consumed by Vivian Stoll and her Fillmore-Graves mercenaries, and it is mentioned in the third-season premiere that his friend and occasional collaborator Carlos Santana issued a public statement in the wake of his death. Thomas was a fan of the show prior to his appearances, and his inclusion was a reference to the fact he and series creator Rob Thomas are often confused for one another on social media.
- Frieda Bader (portrayed by Gina Stockdale, guest seasons 2, 4): Blaine's abusive childhood nanny and Angus' housekeeper. Upon Angus' kidnapping it is revealed his estate and all his assets are to be left to her should his death result in foul play. She returns in the fourth season, when Angus condemns and feeds her to his cult in an effort to make amends with a shocked Blaine.
- Angus' lawyer (portrayed by Michael Kopsa, guest seasons 1, 3): A high-priced attorney employed by Angus McDonough. When Angus is kidnapped by Major and assumed dead, his lawyer arrives at Shady Plots along with Blaine's abusive childhood nanny for a viewing of Angus' video will. After Don E. frees Angus from the Shady Plots freezer, both Angus' lawyer and Peyton are called to the funeral home to oversee Blaine signing his father's fortune back over to him.
- Buck Baracus (portrayed by Liam O'Neill, guest seasons 2–3): Floyd Baracus' son. Major initially elects not to kidnap Baracus after seeing them together, until the latter is forced to go into hiding after beheading Stacey Boss' nephew. In the third season, Baracus takes a bullet for his son during a failed assassination attempt, resulting in the boy witnessing his father enter full-on-zombie mode as Liv attempts to calm him.

==== Introduced in season three ====
- Justin Bell (portrayed by Tongayi Chirisa, recurring season 3; guest seasons 4–5): A zombie Major befriends during his tenure at Fillmore-Graves. Turned into a zombie by Vivian Stoll, he was not initially a soldier within, but a disc jockey who was while working at a Fillmore-Graves gathering. After succumbing to a biological attack, Stoll turned Justin to save his life before offering him a job among her paramilitary group. He eventually becomes a love interest for Liv, although she eventually cheats on him with Chase Graves. Justin breaks up with her when she admits this to him, and he later alerts Fillmore-Graves soldiers to her presence when she attempts to stop them from infecting humans with a false vaccine. He returns in the fourth-season finale and makes amends with Liv, joining Major in the reformed Fillmore-Graves.
- Harley Johns (portrayed by Andrew Caldwell, season 3): An anti-zombie fanatic who seeks to expose the truth about zombies after his brother was killed at Max Rager. After hosting anti-zombie gatherings he captures Don E. with plans to broadcast his starvation to the internet, while also holding an undercover Ravi hostage to study him. While Liv and Blaine team up to rescue their friends. Harley escapes after seeing his brothers gunned down by Fillmore-Graves soldiers. Upon being located by Liv and Clive, Harley himself is revealed to have been made a zombie. After being imprisoned in a freezer, he is freed by Billy Cook and Mr. Huntsman; incidentally killing them before crashing a Fillmore-Graves gathering where he kills Major's colleagues and love interest Natalie in a suicide bombing.
- Chase Graves (portrayed by Jason Dohring, recurring seasons 3–4): The brother-in-law of Vivian Stoll, who takes over Fillmore-Graves after her death. He also takes lead of their soldiers in the field, as their commanded A.K. Fortesan was also killed. While she is dating Justin Bell, Liv sleeps with him while under the influence of Ravi's promiscuous former employer, Katty Kupps. In the aftermath she discovers information implicating him in Katty's murder. It is later revealed that while Vivian Stoll with Fillmore-Graves had a contingency plan in place involving a biological attack, it was Carey Gold (along with her daughter Patrice) who was behind Kupps' murder and set the plan in motion without Graves' order. Instead of letting the humans die, Chase instead set about a plan to provide a tainted vaccine that would turn them into zombies. In spite of this he maintains he is not the bad guy, to which Liv retorts that he is holding Seattle hostage for brains from the rest of the country. The character has been shown to have a short temper, and has a tendency of non-fatally shooting zombies (Justin Bell for stealing confiscated Max Rager, and Johnny Frost's producer for refusing to air his follow-up video to Frost's report revealing the revelation of zombies) who displease him. In the fourth season Chase finds himself morally compromised and struggles not to buckle under the pressure of his new position, eventually snapping and killing one of Major's teen soldiers. According to Rob Thomas, the character was conceived as a back-up plan/surrogate for Vivian Stoll after Andrea Savage left the series due to her commitment to I'm Sorry. By the end of the fourth season, in which he buckled under pressure, Major and Liv kill Chase in the fourth-season finale in an attempt to save the latter from execution.
- Rachel Greenblatt (portrayed by Ella Cannon, recurring seasons 3–4): A photojournalist with whom Ravi strikes a friendship while attending one of Harley Johns' "zombie truther" meetings. Unlike most in attendance, she held no ill will towards zombies and simply wished to capture one on film. After she witnesses Liv and Blaine rescue Don E. from Harley Johns, Ravi tells her the truth about zombies. Though at first it seemed the two would be starting a relationship, she published a picture of Liv alongside all the information that Ravi told her. She later returned to the morgue in an attempt to clear the air between them, but Ravi rejected her; feeling both betrayed and incredulous that she had further questions. She makes a cameo in the fourth season where she is terrorized by Major in retaliation by Fillmore-Graves in response to her writing an article painting Mama Leone a Martyr.
- Carey Gold (portrayed by Anjali Jay, season 3): A teacher and secretary within Fillmore-Graves and confidante to both Vivian Stoll and Chase Graves. She was ultimately revealed to be behind the deaths of Vivian Stoll and the zombie family with ties to Clive. She was killed by Chase Graves during an attempted mutiny at Fillmore-Graves. While she was behind the biological attack that plagued Seattle, the plan was initially formed as a contingency by Vivian Stoll. Carey simply put the plan into action without Fillmore-Graves order. It was initially believed she was behind the death of Katty Kupps as well, though it was revealed to be her daughter, Patrice. Before her death, Carey warned Chase that she had more rogue soldiers within Fillmore-Graves.
- A.K. Fortesan (portrayed by Mike Dopud, season 3): The Fillmore-Graves field commander; and superior officer to Major, Justin, and Zach. Like Vivian Stoll, Fortesan is presumed deceased following the same helicopter explosion orchestrated by Carey Gold. His position is then filled by Chase Graves.
- Zach Stoll (portrayed by Aidan Kahn, season 3): A peer of Major and Justin within Fillmore-Graves. The character was intended to have a relation to Vivian Stoll, though this was never confirmed on-screen. When it is revealed Major was cured and plans to move to Italy with Natalie, Zach throws him a farewell party. The party is bombed by Harley Johns, and though he loses his legs, Zach survives only to be struck by a truck in the following episode.
- Dino (portrayed by Ryan Jefferson Booth, recurring seasons 3–4): An enforcer initially employed by Angus, and later employed by Don E. and Blaine as a bouncer at the Scratching Post. Dino initially shot Blaine on Angus' order, but apparently spared him a fatal shot when Blaine offered him more money than his father. It is noteworthy however; that while Dino spared Blaine a fatal shot, he did not save his life nor is he responsible for Blaine's reversion to zombie form. Though he claimed to Angus he shot him in the mouth, Dino apparently left him bleeding out; which prompted Blaine to turn to Jeremy Chu to be turned into a zombie once more, so that he would not succumb to his wounds. Though initially positioned as a hitman under Angus' employ, working to obtain brains for high-end clients, it is unknown if he carries out this role once Blaine takes over the Scratching Post. It is never mentioned and the character is mostly seen lounging around the bar, unpacking crates of brains, and overseeing their deliveries. He eventually grows tired of Blaine's orders and frees Angus after being informed of his location. Despite his earlier betrayal, he expects compensation, only to be knocked unconscious for his troubles. When Blaine realizes Dino freed Angus from the well, he orders Don E. to deal with him. After decapitating Dino, Don E. tells an amused Dino that he plans to send his disembodied head to Gwyneth Paltrow.
- Katty Kupps (portrayed by Christina Cox, season 3): Ravi's promiscuous former employer at the Centers for Disease Control. The two had a one-night stand, contributing to his break-up with Peyton. She later returns to investigate a potential bio-terror attack, which leads to her eventual murder, seemingly at the hands of Chase Graves. It is revealed that while the bio-attack was a fail-safe plan Chase had developed, the plan and Kupps' murder were in fact carried out by Carey Gold and her daughter Patrice.
- Shawna (portrayed by Sarah Jurgens, season 3): A woman who writes to Major after he is outed as the Chaos Killer. The two briefly become a couple, but Major breaks up with her when he learns she shared private photos and messages on social media, something she claims she did to help the public's perception of him. She inadvertently leads to him being fired from Fillmore-Graves, as their intimacy revealed Major's human status to Chase Graves.
- Tatum Weckler (portrayed by Ava Frye, season 3): A teenage zombie in the care of Carey Gold and who is the best friend of Carey's daughter, Patrice Gold. In the third-season finale, it is revealed that she was turned after joining her friend Patrice at the same Fillmore-Graves party. Liv also discovers it was actually Carey that blackmailed her late father, as a pawn in a conspiracy to ensure the mayoral appointment of a zombie mayor in the ignorant Baracus. She and Patrice are taken into custody by Fillmore-Graves for their involvement in Carey's plans, and the attempted murder of Liv. As the soldiers had their guns trained on the girls, their fates are uncertain; something both actresses have acknowledged while expressing an eagerness to return.
- Patrice Gold (portrayed by Anisha Cheema, season 3): A teenage zombie who is the daughter of Carey Gold and the best friend of Tatum Weckler. She was turned into a zombie at a Fillmore-Graves Fourth of July party alongside Tatum Weckler and Justin Bell. In the season 3 finale, she is ultimately revealed to be the killer of Katty Kupps and is later taken into custody by Fillmore-Graves soldiers alongside Tatum for both being an accomplice to her mother and the attempted murder of Liv. As the soldiers had their guns trained on the girls, their fates are uncertain (especially as her mother was killed by Chase Graves after staging a coup); something both actresses have acknowledged while expressing an eagerness to return.
- Wally Reid (portrayed by Mateo Mingo, season 3): A young zombie boy who is murdered at the beginning of the third season, and who is revealed to have been a former neighbor of Clive. Wally became something of a surrogate son to him after he rescued Wally and his mother Anna from their abusive patriarch. Clive lost contact with the two when he went undercover on a vice assignment, and it is revealed they became zombies after moving in with Wally's Uncle who worked for Fillmore-Graves.
- Mr. Huntsman (portrayed by Peter Kelamis, season 3): A paranoid man who believes in the existence of zombies. He was a neighbor to Wally Reid's family and initially a suspect in their murders after making incriminating calls to Chuck Burd's radio show. Though he provides evidence he was out of town at the time the murders were committed; he later joined Harley Johns' anti-zombie group alongside Billy Cook. The two are eventually killed by Harley after he himself is turned into a zombie.
- James Weckler (portrayed by Gordon Michael Woolvett, season 3): Father to Tatum Weckler. A small time crook who extorted Johnny Frost and murdered a dominatrix whom he (along with Brandt Stone and Floyd Baracus) frequented. Weckler was later revealed to have been extorted by Carey Gold to destroy any evidence of Baracus' indiscretion, lest he lose his mayoral election. After backing out of a plea deal arranged by Peyton, Weckler was hung by a guard in his cell, making it look like a suicide. The guard was later killed, leading Peyton and Liv to uncover a conspiracy. Initially they believe Baracus personally turned Weckler's daughter to strong arm him, while in reality he was ignorant of the truth: Carey Gold threatened to cut off Tatum's brain supply. Weckler also had a history of mental illness, which included hallucinations of his late wife. After Liv consumes his brain, she herself has a hallucination through which she makes peace with the deceased Drake Holloway.
- "Vampire" Steve (portrayed by Kett Turton, recurring seasons 3–5): An expert technician within the Seattle Police Department, and a friend to Jimmy Hahn. Though Steve is not truly a vampire, Clive and Liv refer to him as such due to his gothic style and demeanor; which he was revealed to have initially adopted in an effort to impress a woman who was a fan of The Twilight Series. In the fourth season, Steve remained in Seattle after the zombie outbreak.
- Derek Edelsberg (portrayed by Adam Kaufman, guest seasons 3–4): A lawyer and associate of Peyton's during the Weckler case, who later appears as her love interest when he joins her in Baracus' cabinet in the fourth season.

==== Introduced in season four ====
- Hobbs (played by Adam Greydon Reid, seasons 4–5): Chase's main advisor within Fillmore-Graves, and the one who ultimately appoints Major as his replacement. Major ultimately decides to freeze him and spare his life, as he recognized Chase's corruption despite being complicit in his actions.
- Fisher "Captain Seattle" Webb (portrayed by Jake Manley, season 4): A homeless teen zombie who is recruited into Fillmore-Graves and assigned to be taken under Major's wing. He strikes up a budding romance with Jordan Gladwell and is killed defending her from Chase Graves.
- Jordan Gladwell (portrayed by Jade Payton, seasons 4–5): A homeless teen zombie who is recruited into Fillmore-Graves and assigned to be taken under Major's wing. She is ultimately killed early in the fifth season, leading to Liv taking in her brothers at the Renegade headquarters.
- Russ Roche (portrayed by Giacomo Baessato, season 4): A wealthy zombie who is a regular patron of Blaine's and Don E.'s at the Scratching Post, who also comes into conflict with Liv and Clive due to rumors of his selling watered down brain tubes on the black market. Following a tip from Blaine, Chase and Major become aware of Roche's activities, and the latter is assigned to ingratiate himself to get into the smuggling ring. Ultimately, Roche is revealed as the inside man at Fillmore-Graves, working for the true kingpin, AJ Jin of the Blue Cobra gang.
- Tucker Fritz (portrayed by Jaren Brandt Bartlett, season 4): An anti-zombie bigot who was accidentally turned into a zombie by Jordan Gladwell, thus causing a potential scandal within Fillmore-Graves. Rejected by his friends and family, he joins Angus' religious cult.
- Mama "Renegade" Leone (portrayed by Dawnn Lewis, season 4): A "coyote" who smuggles humans in and out of New Seattle, while also turning dying individuals into zombies. This makes her a target of Chase Graves, who enlists Blaine to find her in exchange for allowing him to operate freely in New Seattle. Reluctantly, he has her publicly executed so as to make an example of her.
- Stan (portrayed by Micah Steinke, seasons 4–5): A member of Mama Leone's organization who later is recalled by Levon and Liv following her death.
- Mace Diller (played by Nick Heffelfinger, season 4): A member of the anti-zombie group, the "Dead Enders", and a former friend of Tucker Fritz. After Angus' sermons get spread across the internet, Mace makes an assassination attempt that Tucker prevents.
- Reid Sackman (portrayed by Nathanael Vass, season 4): An anti-zombie bigot who films Jordan scratching Tucker.
- Michelle Hunter (portrayed by Christie Laing, seasons 4–5): A beat cop new to Seattle, whom Liv tries to set up with Clive while under the impression that Bozzio was having an affair. The two do strike up a romance after Bozzio (upon hearing he wants children) leaves Clive, but ultimately Clive decides to reconcile and propose to Bozzio.
- Bruce Holtz (portrayed by Christopher Macke, season 4): A serial killer and rogue "coyote" who smuggled people in and out of Seattle, while truly ransoming them killing them to sell their brains on the black market.
- Tim Timmerson (portrayed by Keenan Tracey, season 4): A zombie Liv meets at the Scratching Post, and briefly assumes to be her soulmate. She dumps him upon learning he joined Angus' zombie cult.
- Dalton (portrayed by Ryan Devlin, seasons 4–5): A brain dealer who sells his supply to zombie restaurants in Seattle, including the rechristened Shady Plots, "Romero's". He returns in the fourth episode of the fifth season as a suspect in a murder investigation, where it is revealed he also deals mind-altering substances.
- Levon Patch (portrayed by Daniel Bonjour, season 4): A documentary filmmaker who is making a film about humans who bring terminally ill humans to New Seattle in order to get scratched, and Liv's new love interest. He is executed by Chase Graves in the fourth-season finale for his role in Renegade's operations, but not before his documentary (narrated by Paul Rudd) is released to the public.
- Enzo Lambert (portrayed by John Emmet Tracy, seasons 4–5): A French inspector working for Fillmore-Graves who is assigned to investigate the murders of zombies. It initially appears as though he is a closested zombie supremacist, as he becomes a follower of Angus. Ultimately it is implied he betrayed him and orchestrated a trap that led to his death, though his zombie supremacist beliefs are reaffirmed in the fifth season as he is revealed to be aligned with Liv's father, Martin Roberts.
- Suki (portrayed by Melissa O'Neil, season 4): A coyote who works with Levon and Stan.
- Isobel Bloom (portrayed by Izabela Vidovic, season 4): A terminal young girl who Liv helps smuggle into New Seattle, though she appears to be immune to the zombie virus. Accepting her fate, she hopes to help Ravi work towards a successful vaccine before ultimately dying. Ravi experiments on her brain which results in his developing a new cure, which Liv ultimately gives to Bozzio as a wedding present.
- "Crybaby" Carl (portrayed by Nemo Cartwright, seasons 4–5): Blaine and Don E.'s new muscle following Dino's betrayal. Don E. describes him as a psychopath who has a medical condition leading to him constantly having watering eyes.
- "Zombie Killer" Cain (portrayed by James Jordan, season 4): A serial killer who targets zombie victims who he sees as already dead, and believing himself to be the one to end their suffering. He was incarcerated after killing his infected family, only to escape when Angus' cult attacked his prison transport bus. In the subsequent episode he nearly kills Chase Graves only to be stopped by Major. Cain begs to die only for Graves to order Major to scratch him; so he can vindictively have him publicly executed.
- Curtis (portrayed by Samuel Patrick Chu, seasons 4–5): A new coyote recruit who joins Liv's Renegade operations only to be caught by Fillmore-Graves. Liv turns him into a zombie to buy him time before his scheduled execution, and later turns herself in to spare him only to realize Levon has done the same.
- Sloane Mills (portrayed by Laura Bilgeri, seasons 4–5): Daughter of an army general who has made life miserable for Fillmore-Graves, especially after she was kidnapped and turned into a zombie.

==== Introduced in season five ====
- Martin "Beanpole Bob" Roberts (portrayed by Bill Wise): Liv's long lost father who Eva left due to his substance abuse. He is revealed to be the true creator of the tainted Utopium, and a radical zombie extremist.
- Glen Mills (portrayed by Andrew Kavadas): Army general who wants to destroy New Seattle after his daughter was kidnapped. Usually addressed as General Mills, a reference to the food processing corporation.
- Dolly Durkins (portrayed by Jennifer Irwin): A human supremacist who manipulates events within the city in an effort to force the government's extermination it zombies. She secretly orchestrates the death of Mills’ daughter, after he arms her militia.
- Alice "Al" Bronson (portrayed by Gage Golightly): a zombie reporter who gets close to Blaine ultimately to expose his crimes. She is revealed to be the niece of Stacey Boss, acting on his orders to get revenge on Blaine for making Stacey his underling.
- Charlie Collier (portrayed by Quinta Brunson): A doctor at the CDC who strikes up a friendship with Ravi and becomes an ally to the group.
- Dr. Saxon (portrayed by Aaron Craven): Charlie's superior at the CDC and the Doctor overseeing efforts to recreate the zombie cure.
- Darcy Bennett (portrayed by Valerie Tian): A college student with Freylich's syndrome from whom Blaine purchases her brain upon the event of her death. She becomes a love interest to Don E. only to pass before their wedding, seemingly due to her illness. When Peyton, as a newly turned zombie after being shot by Bubba, later eats Bubba's brain, it is revealed that her death was the result of Blaine smothering her as revenge after learning Don E. cut him out of the brain business.
- Bubba (portrayed by Artine Tony Browne): A bounty hunter and smuggler employed by Blaine to kidnap the Freylich kids. He secretly helped Candy escape the city after she stole a zombie cure. He is eventually killed by Peyton during her successful attempt to free the Freylich kids from Blaine, though he also shoots her during the escape.
- Chris "Spud" Tader (portrayed by Emy Aneke): a former Fillmore-Graves soldier who joins Martin and Enzo's ranks.
- Graham Moss (portrayed by Dejan Loyola): A teacher who loses his job due to being a zombie and is later hired to tutor the kids at Liv's Renegade headquarters. After his boyfriend is kidnapped by Martin and Enzo, he is blackmailed into spying for them.
- Riley (portrayed by Kayleh Zander): One of Martin and Enzo's fanatics who is brought in to Liv's Renegade operations with the secret intent to get out of the city and spread the zombie virus.
- Mom E (portrayed by Amy Reid): Don E's mother with whom Blaine lives with after he has Don E burn his home to hide evidence. Blaine charms her into waiting on him with expensive gifts, and it is mentioned she has left Don and Scott's abusive stepfather who was mentioned in the first season.
