= Off Key =

Off Key may refer to:

- Off-key, musical content played out of the correct key,
- Desafinado, a jazz song sometimes called "Off Key" in English,
- Off Key (1994 film), a Canadian short drama film directed by Karethe Linaae,
- Off Key (2001 film), a Spanish-British-Italian comedy film directed by Manuel Gómez Pereira.
