= David Lovgren =

Canadian actor

- Born: Vancouver, British Columbia, Canada
- Education: Studio 58
- Years active: 1987–present

David Lovgren is a Canadian actor. He had a recurring role in the espionage series Intelligence.

== Career ==
He graduated in theatre at Studio 58, Langara College in Vancouver and began acting at the age of 17.

Lovgren appeared in the feature films Cool Runnings (1993), Live Bait (1995) and Antitrust (2001). He appeared in two 1999 films that received critical attention: Rollercoaster and Something More. Ken Eisner of Variety wrote that "Lovgren spookily recalls the young Christopher Walken" and Marc Horton of the Edmonton Journal wrote that Lovgren's was the best performance in Something More (1999). His performance in the teen film Rollercoaster (1999) was called "memorable" by Ken Eisner. He received attention for his performance in Off Key (1994), in which he performed nude, when the film screened at the Cannes Film Festival. He performed in the television film Beyond Obsession.

On television, he has performed on many television series shot in Vancouver such as The Commish, The Outer Limits, Smallville, X-Files, Supernatural, Stargate SG-1 and Stargate: Atlantis.

On the stage, he appeared in a 1997 production at Richmond Gateway Theatre of Death of a Salesman, in which he played Happy Loman, and for which he received positive notice in The Province.

== Selected filmography ==
- Cool Runnings (1993)
- Off Key (1994)
- Live Bait (1995)
- Something More (1999)
- Rollercoaster (1999)
- Antitrust (2001)
- The Dick Knost Show (2013)

== Awards and nominations ==
Year	Award	Category	Work	Result	Refs
2002	Leo Awards	Best Lead Performance by a Male in a Feature Length Drama	Sea	Nominated	
2002	Leo Awards	Best Performance by a Male in a Short Drama	Room	Nominated	
2018	Leo Awards	Best Performance by a Male in a Short Drama	Do We Leave This Here	Nominated	
