= And He Shall Be a Good Man =

- iZombie episode
- Episode no.: Season 4 Episode 13
- Directed by: Dan Etheridge
- Written by: Rob Thomas
- Production code: T27.13613
- Original air date: May 28, 2018

Guest appearances
- Paul Rudd as himself (voice); Daniel Bonjour as Levon Patch; Jason Dohring as Chase Graves

Episode chronology
← Previous "You've Got to Hide Your Liv Away"	Next → "Thug Death"

"And He Shall Be a Good Man" is the thirteenth and final episode of the fourth season of the American science fiction television series iZombie. The episode was written by series creator Rob Thomas and directed by Dan Etheridge. The series revolves around medical examiner Olivia Moore (Rose McIver), who was turned into a zombie and must eat brains to sustain herself and while working with the Seattle Police Department to solve crimes. It features a cameo from Paul Rudd.

"And He Shall Be a Good Man" was released on The CW on May 28, 2018, to an audience of 780,000 viewers. It was praised by critics.

== Plot ==
Chase prepares to execute Liv and Levon, while Ravi, Peyton and Clive all try to stop him. Major and Jordan work together to distract Fillmore-Graves, which leads them to move up the execution. Liv's associates release Levon's documentary video on her work, after the public view the documentary they prepare to prevent the execution. Chase watches the documentary and begins the execution early. Chase uses a guillotine to kill Levon. Moments later, Major breaks the door open and saves Liv's life, accidentally pushing Chase into the guillotine and killing him. Major becomes the new commander of Fillmore-Graves.

Ravi gives Liv the brain of Isobel's and tells her that it is the zombie cure, but Liv decides to give it to Dale after she and Clive get married. Angus leads 1,000 zombies outside the wall, but the US Army shoots them all down and kills them, including Angus. Earlier that day, the government had announced an end to shipping brains to New Seattle; so that humans either kill zombies in self-defense or all the humans die and New Seattle gets nuked to wipe out the zombie virus. Needing to prevent that, Major is forced to make a deal with Blaine, promising wealth and respectability in exchange for bringing brains into the city. As Liv prepares to retire, she walks into her apartment lobby, where a crowd of zombies and humans cheer her on, and she decides to stay on as Renegade.

== Production ==
"And He Shall Be A Good Man" was written by series creator Rob Thomas, and directed by Dan Etheridge. The title of the episode is a lyric from the Elton John song "Levon", which foreshadows the death of Levon in the episode. The episode features a voice only cameo by Paul Rudd as himself narrating a pro-zombie documentary. Rudd voice over was described both in and out of universe as a "good get". Rudd had previously worked with Thomas on the third season of Veronica Mars as Desmond Fellows.

The episode stars Rose McIver as Olivia Moore, alongside principal cast members Robert Buckley as Major Lillywhite, Malcolm Goodwin as Clive Babineaux, Aly Michalka as Payton Charles, Robert Knepper as Angus McDonough, Rahul Kohli as Ravi Chakrabarti, and David Anders as Blaine DeBeers. This episode marks the finale appearance of Knepper in iZombie as he would not return for the fifth and final season. The CW publicly stated that the decision to remove the character was a creative choice and not related to the sexual allegation against Knepper. Mark Pedowitz, then president of The CW, told /Film that "Robert only had a one-year deal anyway" and that "his character had a definitive path" which was "decided way ahead of time". Jason Dohring and Daniel Bonjour recur as Chase Graves and Levon Patch, respectively.

== Release ==
"And He Shall Be a Good Man" released on The CW on May 28, 2018, to an audience of 780,000 live viewers.

=== Critical reception ===
The episode was met with positive reactions from critics. Many critics praised Paul Rudd's cameo feeling that while it was unexpected it still worked. Writing for Den of Geek, Kayti Burt gave the episode 3.5/5 stars. praised the romantic accepts of the episode. However, while criticizing the character arc of Major Lillywhite.

Writing for The A.V. Club, Carrie Raisler rated the episode a B+. Raisler felt that episode was a "solid ending" to a "frustrating season". He stated that while the episode was good overall, various sections were underdeveloped, the most prominent of which being Angus' story arc. Raisler described the arc as both "underdeveloped" and anticlimactic. Raisler praised the episode for wrapping up the narrative, feeling optimistic for the next season.
