= A Simple Curve =

Canadian drama film

- Directed by: Aubrey Nealon
- Written by: Aubrey Nealon
- Produced by: Aubrey Nealon
- Starring: Kris Lemche; Michael Hogan; Matt Craven
- Cinematography: David Geddes
- Edited by: Karen Porter
- Music by: Ohad Benchetrit; Justin Small
- Production company: Idaho Peak Productions
- Release date: September 12, 2005 (TIFF)
- Running time: 92 minutes
- Country: Canada
- Language: English

A Simple Curve is a Canadian drama film, directed by Aubrey Nealon and released in 2005.

The film stars Kris Lemche as Caleb, a man in his mid-20s who works as a junior partner in his father Jim's (Michael Hogan) woodworking shop in the rural Slocan Valley of British Columbia. Dissatisfied with his life and aspiring to revive the failing business, he is forced to confront his father's anti-establishment values when Matthew (Matt Craven), an old friend of Jim's who has gone on to become a successful real estate developer in Vancouver, approaches them with a contract to build chairs for a new resort development in the region. The film's cast also includes Pascale Hutton, Sarah Lind, Kett Turton, Ben Cotton and Waneta Storms.

Nealon described the film as partially inspired by his own upbringing as the child of American hippie parents who had moved to Canada as Vietnam War objectors, but stressed that the film was not a literal autobiography.

The film premiered at the 2005 Toronto International Film Festival in the Canada First program, and was subsequently screened as the opening film of the Canadian Images program at the 2005 Vancouver International Film Festival.

== Cast ==
- Kris Lemche as Caleb
- Michael Hogan as Jim
- Matt Craven as Matthew
- Pascale Hutton as Lee
- Sarah Lind as Erika
- Birkett Turton as Buck (as Kett Turton)
- Michael Robinson as Phil
- Petra Hartley as Hannah

== Accolades ==
The film was named to the Toronto International Film Festival's annual year-end Canada's Top Ten list for 2005, and was a nominee for Best Feature Film at the 2006 Directors Guild of Canada awards. It led the nominations for the 2006 Leo Awards, with nods in 12 categories including Best Picture and nods for Nealon for Best Director and Best Screenwriting, and won the awards for Best Supporting Actress (Lind) and Best Cinematography (David Geddes).
