= Something More (1999 film) =

1999 film directed by Rob W. King

- Directed by: Rob W. King
- Written by: Peter Bryant
- Produced by: Maureen MacDonald; Kevin DeWalt
- Starring: Michael A. Goorjian; Chandra West; David Lovgren; Tom Cavanagh
- Cinematography: Jon Kranhouse
- Edited by: Doug Forbes
- Music by: Rob Bryanton
- Production companies: Minds Eye Pictures; Eighty Seven Bear Images
- Distributed by: Alliance Atlantis Releasing
- Release date: September 10, 1999 (Canada)
- Running time: 98 minutes
- Country: Canada
- Language: English

Something More is a 1999 Canadian comedy film directed by Rob W. King. It stars Michael A. Goorjian, Chandra West, David Lovgren and Jennifer Beals. The film was written by Peter Bryant, and produced by Minds Eye Pictures.

== Plot summary ==
A group of friends in their late 20s play for a church basketball team. Two of them compete for the affections of a woman.

== Production ==
The film was shot in Saskatchewan.

== Cast ==
- Michael A. Goorjian as Sam
- Chandra West as Kelly
- David Lovgren as Jim
- Tom Cavanagh as Harry
- Peter Flemming as Dan
- Kurt Max Runte as Will
- Nathaniel DeVeaux as Coach Louie
- Jennifer Beals as Lisa

== Reception ==
Ken Eisner, writing for Variety, said it was an "amiable, undemanding comedy." Marc Horton of the Edmonton Journal wrote that the dialogue was not believable and that the resolution was too predictable. Liam Lacey of The Globe & Mail wrote "Something More could have been played as an embittered little satire along the lines of About Last Night or Your Friends and Neighbors. As such, it probably would have been a more interesting movie. As it stands, it's really just a commercial calling card -- a way for novice feature director Rob King and the film's Canadian producers to show that they too can create perfectly competent, undemanding diversions."
