= Crazy on the Outside =

2010 film by Tim Allen

- Theatrical release poster
- Directed by: Tim Allen
- Written by: Judd Pillot; John Peaslee
- Produced by: Brian Reilly; Brett Gregory; Anastasia Stanecki
- Starring: Tim Allen; Sigourney Weaver; Jeanne Tripplehorn; J. K. Simmons; Julie Bowen; Kelsey Grammer; Ray Liotta
- Cinematography: Robbie Greenberg
- Edited by: Scott Conrad
- Music by: David Newman
- Production company: Boxing Cat Films
- Distributed by: Freestyle Releasing
- Release date: January 8, 2010
- Running time: 96 minutes
- Country: United States
- Language: English
- Box office: $88,335

Crazy on the Outside is a 2010 American comedy film starring and directed by Tim Allen. The film marks Allen's feature film directorial debut, and is notable for reuniting Allen with co-stars from many of his previous films (Sigourney Weaver from Galaxy Quest, Ray Liotta from Wild Hogs, Kelsey Grammer from Toy Story 2 and Julie Bowen from Joe Somebody).

== Plot ==
Thomas Zelda (Tim Allen) has been paroled from prison for being involved in movie piracy. He is picked up by his eccentric sister Viki (Sigourney Weaver) who is revealed to be a habitual liar (she claims it's so people aren't hurt by the truth).

Tommy arrives at Viki's home, where he plans to spend some time putting his life back together when it is revealed that his grandmother was told (by Viki) that he went to France instead of prison. Due to her heart condition, Tommy keeps up the story leading to a euphemism where France means "prison". Viki's husband Ed (J.K. Simmons) asks Tommy if he thinks he'll go "back to France" soon.

During dinner, Gray (Ray Liotta), Tommy's old partner from the movie piracy business, shows up and his sister runs him off.

The next day, Tommy meets with his parole officer, Angela Popadopolous (Jeanne Tripplehorn), who requires him to work at a pirate-themed restaurant called "Pirate Burger" as part of his parole. He informs Angela that he wants to start up his father's painting business instead, but is told that he is required to work at the restaurant.

While on the job, Tommy sees Christy (Julie Bowen), his "dead" ex-girlfriend come up to the drive-through window. Realizing Viki lied to him, he takes the delivery car to see Christy, leading them to spend the night together. The next morning, it is revealed that Christy is engaged to Frank (Kelsey Grammer) and Tommy is forced to escape the apartment.

Since he took the delivery car without permission, Tommy is fired from "Pirate Burger" and risks going back to jail for breaking the terms of his parole. Tommy is given another chance and goes back to work.

That night, Tommy is "kidnapped" by Gray who tries to persuade him to get back into the piracy business. Tommy refuses stating that he wants to "go straight".

Tommy is called to make a delivery. He arrives at Angela's apartment. Her son Ethan is trying to play matchmaker to get her to start dating again. While there, Tommy notices that the apartment is in need of a paint job. Tommy decides to show Angela the kind of work he can do. With the help of two ex-con coworkers Rick and Edgar (Malcolm Goodwin and Jon Gries) from Pirate Burger, Tommy breaks into Angela's apartment while she's away and repaints the living room.

Meanwhile, the fictional story about Tommy's "France" trip continues to evolve including a relationship with Simone, a French astronaut who was killed on the launchpad so that Tommy's mother would not fly everyone to France to meet her (because she does not exist).

Angela is furious at Tommy for breaking and entering, but understands what he was trying to do and doesn't press charges. She sets him up to paint a judge's home. While doing the job, Angela shows up to check on Tommy's work and invites him to observe Ethan's little league team. Later, the judge's wife who is impressed by the work invites Tommy to paint the upstairs as well.

While getting tools together, Edgar and Rick prepare the upstairs for painting and knock the judge's wife's diamond ring off the dresser. Wanting to do something nice for Tommy, Edgar steals the ring and gives it to Christy as a "gift from Tommy". Tommy, who doesn't know that the theft has occurred, joins Angela at the little league game and they begin to express feelings for each other. They set up a formal date.

When Tommy arrives at Angela's apartment for the date, Angela is furious over the theft and demands the ring back. Tommy goes to Pirate Burger to confront Edgar and Rick, but they have disappeared. He steals the delivery car (his vehicle refuses to start) and calls Edgar and Rick. They inform him of the ring's location and he drives to Christy's house to get the ring back. After a short confrontation with Frank and Christy, he gets the ring and returns it to Angela.

The manager of Pirate Burger presses charges on Tommy, and he goes back to jail. Gray shows up to bail him out and, disillusioned with his attempts to "go straight", Tommy teams back up with Gray.

Meanwhile, Ethan shows up at Viki's house wanting to see Tommy but he is not there. Viki finds Tommy with Gray at the airport and makes up a story about Ethan going missing. Tommy chooses to abandon Gray at the airport (after Gray pushes Viki to the ground) to find Ethan. When he shows up at Angela's apartment, he finds out that Viki has lied to him again. Tommy's concern for the well being of her son softens Angela's animosity towards him.

At the behest of Viki, Tommy invites Angela to come to a dinner at Viki's house. Angela shows up for the dinner. A story Viki told Tommy's grandmother about Angela being Tommy's "grief counselor" falls apart when Angela informs her that she is actually Tommy's parole officer, and the France story falls apart too. Viki tries to act surprised, but nobody buys it.

== Cast ==
- Tim Allen as Tommy Zelda, the parolee
- Jeanne Tripplehorn as Angela Papadopolous, a single-mom parole officer whom Tommy tries to date
- Sigourney Weaver as Viki Zelda, Tommy's loving but manipulative older sister
- J. K. Simmons as Ed, Viki's sarcastic, taunting husband and Tommy's brother-in-law
- Ray Liotta as Gray, Tommy's old partner in crime
- Julie Bowen as Christy
- Kelsey Grammer as Frank
- Malcolm Goodwin as Rick
- Jon Gries as Edgar
- Helen Slayton-Hughes as Grandma Zelda
- Karle Warren as Alex Luboja
- Daniel Booko as Cooper Luboja
- Kenton Duty as Ethan Papadopolous
- Meeghan Holaway as Tina
- Brian Lynn Graham as Convict
- Evelyn Iocolano as Denise
- Jeff Kueppers as Steve
- John Hayden as Judge Pierce
- Jean St. James as Mrs. Pierce
- Casey Sander as Prison Guard

== Production ==
News of the production was announced in March 2008.

Tim Allen financed the film himself, a choice taken by Kevin Costner on various films. Costner advised Allen "on how to direct it, how to put it out" into distribution. He also received directing advice from Barry Sonnenfeld and Francis Ford Coppola.

Casting included friends he had previously worked with, including Sigourney Weaver and Ray Liotta. Weaver, Jeanne Tripplehorn, and J. K. Simmons were announced in April 2008. Production began that same month, with Weaver having just wrapped Avatar. Production wrapped at some point before October.

== Release ==
In December 2009, Tim Allen did a preview tour for the film, entitled "Stand Up and Show It." The 8-city, 10-day tour would begin with a standup routine, followed by a screening. Allen suggested the concept may not have worked out, as he felt he was too funny ahead of the "light comedy" film. The tour visited Birmingham, Michigan (Dec. 1), St. Louis Park, Minnesota (Dec. 2), Phoenix, Arizona (Dec. 3), and Atlanta, Georgia (Dec. 8).

== Reception ==
On Rotten Tomatoes, the film has an approval rating of 8% based on reviews from 12 critics, with an average score of 2.62/10. On Metacritic, it has a score of 21 out of 100 based on reviews from 7 critics, indicating "generally unfavorable" reviews.

Joe Leydon of Variety magazine wrote: "Looking and sounding like a second-tier '80s made-for-cabler, Crazy on the Outside is the sort of bland trifle one might watch to kill time during an extended flight." Peter Travers of Rolling Stone wrote: "Allen screws up his directing debut with a script that smothers his wit in a blanket of bland."
