= Off Key (1994 film) =

- Directed by: Karethe Linaae
- Produced by: Wade Ferley
- Starring: David Lovgren; Gabrielle Rose
- Cinematography: Wade Ferley
- Music by: Schaun Tozer
- Release date: September 1994 (Cannes)
- Running time: 22 minutes
- Country: Canada
- Language: English

Off Key is a Canadian drama short film, directed by Karethe Linaae and released in 1994. Made as her thesis project for the film studies program at the University of British Columbia, the film centres on a sexually charged battle of wills between Vladimir (David Lovgren), a Russian concert pianist, and Agnes (Gabrielle Rose), a photographer who wants Vladimir to pose in the nude.

According to Linaae, the film's principal theme is about the double-standard in North American filmmaking, under which it's more acceptable to depict extreme gore and violence than it is to show a naked body.

The film premiered in the International Critics' Week program at the 1994 Cannes Film Festival, and had its Canadian premiere at the 1994 Toronto International Film Festival.

The film was a Genie Award nominee for Best Theatrical Short Film at the 16th Genie Awards.
