= Malcolm Goodwin =

American actor (born 1982)

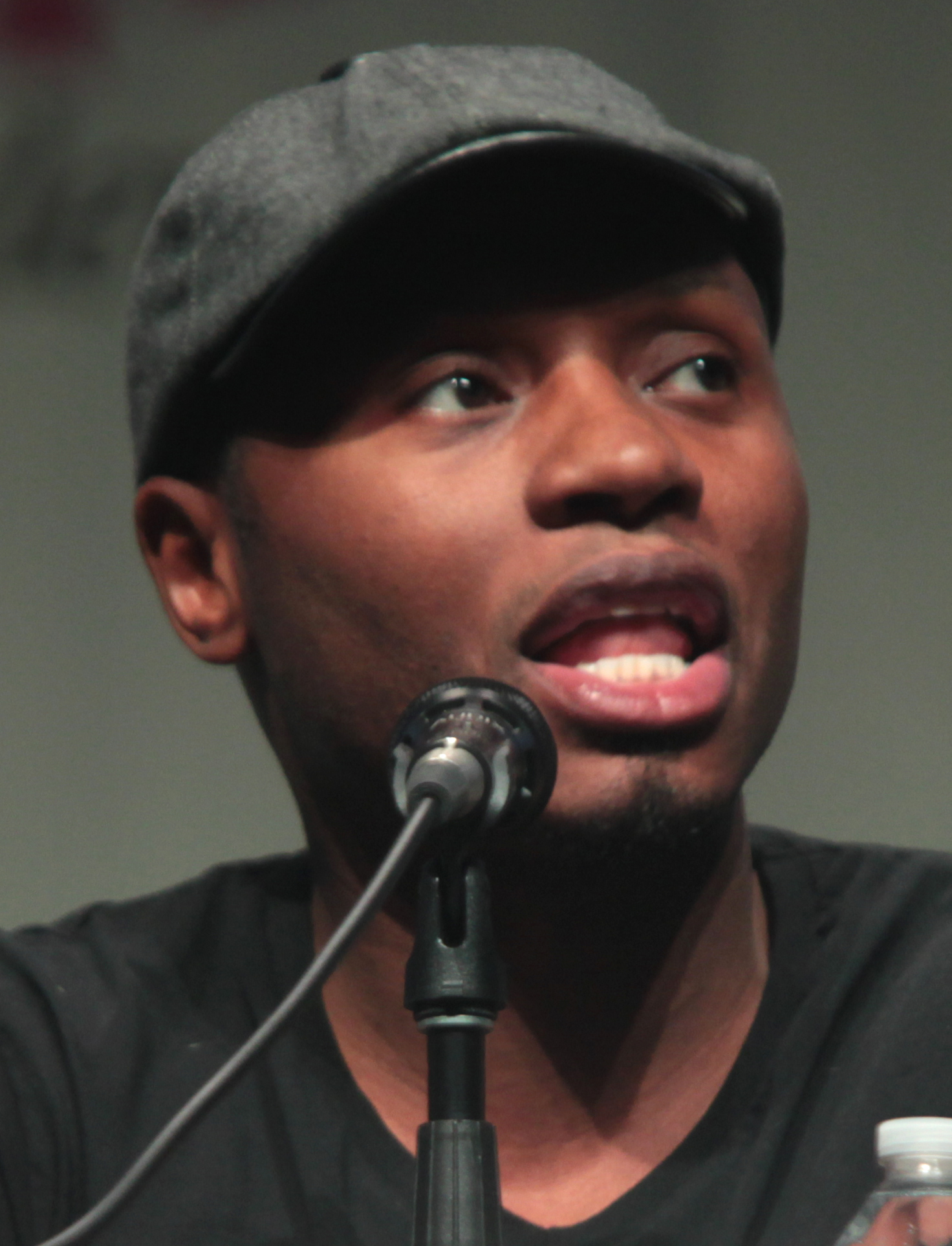
- Goodwin in 2015
- Born: November 28, 1982 (age 43); New York City, U.S.
- Education: State University of New York, Purchase (BFA)
- Occupations: Actor; producer; director
- Years active: 1997–present

Malcolm Goodwin (born November 28, 1982) is an American actor, known for his role as Clive Babineaux in The CW supernatural comedy-drama series iZombie (2015–2019).

In 2022, Goodwin portrayed Oscar Finlay in the Amazon Prime Video series Reacher.

== Life and career ==
His love for acting began during his time with the Julia Richman Talent Unlimited Program in New York City. He later trained at SUNY Purchase College Acting Conservatory, where he earned a bachelor's degree in Theatre Arts and Film.

Goodwin has directed and produced independent commercials, sketches, short films, music videos and public service announcements. In 2011 he appeared in the music video for the song "Party Rock Anthem" by LMFAO. He has been featured in articles for Interview, L.A. Confidential, King, Vibe, and Venice. Goodwin also had minor roles in various films and TV shows, such as American Gangster, Detroit 1-8-7, Leatherheads, The Longshots, Crazy on the Outside.

In 2015, Goodwin was cast in the lead male role of Det. Clive Babineaux on The CW television series iZombie.

== Filmography ==
=== Film ===
Year	Title	Role	Notes
1997	Color of Justice	Shawn	TV movie
2005	Wake of the Fallen Sun	Jacob	Short
2005	Backseat	Ricky	
2005	Get Rich or Die Tryin'	Shaarocks	
2006	The Architect	Big Tim	
2007	Got Next	Drew	Short
2007	Anamorph	Museum Guard	
2007	American Gangster	Jimmy Zee	
2008	Leatherheads	Bakes	
2008	Deception	Cabbie	
2008	The Longshots	Roy	
2008	Miracle at St. Anna	Higgins	
2008	The Lazarus Project	Robbie	
2009	Mississippi Damned	Sammy Stone	
2009	Brief Interviews with Hideous Men	Father of Subject #42	
2009	Black Gloves	James	Short
2010	Crazy on the Outside	Rick	
2011	Make a Movie Like Spike	Ronald	
2011	The Tommy O Show Starring America	Mac Man	TV movie
2012	Rhino	Hank	
2012	Freelancers	A.D.	
2013	A True Story	Jason	
2013	Thank You Card	Jamaal	Short
2014	Hot Fail	Matt	Short
2015	Run All Night	Officer Colston	
2015	Lucky Number	Garrett 'G' Brown	
2017	The Bigfoot Project	Junior	
2019	Skater	David Byrd	Short
2019	Ring Ring	Will	
2020	Be the Light	Marvin	
2020	The Bellmen	Jeff Bridges	
2021	Not Quite College	Taxi Tommy	

=== Television ===
Year	Title	Role	Notes
2003	Law & Order	Lamont Tyler	Episode: "Patient Zero"
2003	Hack	-	Episode: "Out of the Ashes"
2004	Law & Order: Criminal Intent	Elvin Fergin	Episode: "Mad Hops"
2007	K-Ville	Troy Boulet	Episode: "Critical Mass"
2009	Raising the Bar	Wesley Wedderburn	Episode: "Is There a Doctor in the House?"
2010	Detroit 1-8-7	KJ	Episode: "Nobody's Home/Unknown Soldier"
2011–12	Breakout Kings	Shea Daniels	Main cast
2012	CSI: Crime Scene Investigation	Aaron Voss	Episode: "Fallen Angels"
2013	Elementary	Andre Bell	Episode: "Details"
2013	Blue Bloods	Angelo Reid	Episode: "Unwritten Rules"
2013	Bones	CC Creach	Episode: "The Dude in the Dam"
2014	House of Cards	Darnell Hayes	Episode: "Chapter 22"
2014	True Blood	Joe Thornton	Episode: "Almost Home"
2015	Wayward Pines	Dr. Bauer	Episode: "Where Paradise Is Home"
2015–19	iZombie	Clive Babineaux	Main cast
2019	Bull	Eddie Mitchell	Episode: "Rectify"
2019	FBI	Agent Collins	Episode: "Codename: Ferdinand"
2020	The Fugitive	Kevin Lawson	Recurring cast
2022–23	Reacher	Oscar Finlay	Main cast (season 1); guest (season 2)
2023	The Fall of the House of Usher	Young C. Auguste Dupin	Recurring cast
2024–25	Law & Order: Organized Crime	Moses Warren	Guest (seasons 4–5)
