= Kett Turton =

Canadian actor (born 1982)

Birkett Turton
- Born: Birkett Kealy Turton; April 4, 1982 (age 44); Portland, Oregon, U.S.
- Education: Royal Academy of Dramatic Art
- Occupation: Actor
- Years active: 1997–present

Birkett Kealy "Kett" Turton (born April 4, 1982) is an American-Canadian actor. He starred in feature films such as Rollercoaster (1999), Gypsy 83 (2001), Heart of America (2003), A Simple Curve (2005), and Keeper (2025). On television, he had a starring role in the fantasy comedy-drama series Dead Last (2001), and recurring roles as Vampire Steve in the supernatural procedural drama series iZombie (2017), and as attorney Yannick Krol in the legal comedy-drama series Family Law (2021).

He was also featured in television series such as Millennium (1997), Honey, I Shrunk the Kids: The TV Show (2001), Smallville (2002), Dark Angel (2002), The Dead Zone (2002), Dead Like Me (2003), 24 (2003), Supernatural (2005), Fringe (2012), Gotham (2014), The Flash (2015), Blue Bloods (2015), Deadbeat (2015), Jessica Jones (2015), The Magicians (2018), and Riverdale (2020) and The Good Doctor (2021).

== Early life ==
Birkett Kealy Turton was born in Portland, Oregon, United States on April 4, 1982, and raised in Vancouver, Canada. He started acting in local theater performances when he was four years old.

In 2009, he earned a BA in Acting at the Royal Academy of Dramatic Art (RADA) in London.

== Career ==
Turton has had various roles in both television and film. Most notable are his major roles in the Canadian film Rollercoaster (1999) at the age of 15, which earned him a Leo Award nomination for Best Actor, in the television series Dead Last (2001), in the mini-series Kingdom Hospital, and the film Gypsy 83 (2001), in which he played the role of Clive, a gay, goth teen coming of age, alongside Sara Rue. This role earned him the Best Actor Award at Outfest, an LGBT film festival.

He has also appeared in the television series Millennium (1997), Honey, I Shrunk the Kids: The TV Show (2001), Smallville (2002), Dark Angel (2002), The Dead Zone (2002), Dead Like Me (2003), 24 (2003), Supernatural (2005), Fringe (2012), Gotham (2014), The Flash (2015), Blue Bloods (2015), Deadbeat (2015), Jessica Jones (2015), iZombie (2017), The Magicians (2018), Riverdale (2020), The Good Doctor (2021), and Earth Abides (2024).

From 2021 to 2025, Turton had a recurring role as attorney Yannick Krol in television series Family Law.

In 2025, Turton appeared in Osgood Perkins's horror film Keeper (2025). Turton will also appear in Perkins' upcoming horror film The Young People (2026), and in Rob Willey's upcoming horror film Silver Creek.

== Filmography ==
=== Film ===
Year	Title	Role	Notes	Ref.
1999	Rollercoaster	Darrin		
1999	H-E Double Hockey Sticks	Skid		
2000	Ricky 6	Greg		
2001	Gypsy 83	Clive Webb		
2002	The Water Game	Gavin		
2003	Heart of America	Daniel Lyne		
2003	Coming Down the Mountain	Joe	Short film	
2003	Falling Angels	Tom		
2004	Saved!	Mitch		
2004	Walking Tall	Kenner		
2004	My Old Man	Young Hank	Short film	
2004	Show Me	Jackson		
2004	Blade: Trinity	Dingo		
2005	A Simple Curve	Buck		
2006	Firewall	Vel		
2012	Wrath of the Titans	Elite Guard No. 2		
2013	Cinemanovels	Adam		
2015	Eadweard	Rondinella		
2016	Curmudgeons	Brant	Short film	
2016	Wiener-Dog	Film Director		
2016	Our Time	Gabe		
2017	Cut Shoot Kill	Jason		
2018	O.I.	Chris	Short film	
2018	20 Minutes to Life	Officer Annesley	Short film	
2018	Corporate Monster	Robert Turner		
2021	Chef's Kiss		Short film	
2023	Unnatural Causes			
2024	Strange Events Sim	Christ	Segment "O.I."	
2025	Keeper	Darren Westbridge		
2026	The Young People			
TBA	Silver Creek			

=== Television film ===
Year	Title	Role	Ref.
1998	Beauty	Sean	
1999	Our Guys: Outrage at Glen Ridge	John	
2000	Secret Cutting	Craig Crosetto	
2000	Deadlocked	Ellis Moseley	
2005	Ladies Night	Zack Pavalek	

=== Television series ===
Year	Title	Role	Notes	Ref.
1997	Millennium	Ghost Storyteller	Episode: "The Curse of Frank Black"	
1998	Dead Man's Gun	'Little Boy' Dawkins	Episode: "The Photographer"	
1998	The X Files	Brit (uncredited)	Episode: "The Pine Bluff Variant"	
1998	Da Vinci's Inquest	Nate Gillis	Episode: "Gabriel"	
1999	The Net	Kiss Shirt	Episode: "Chem Lab"	
1999	First Wave	Normal, Illinois	Episode: "Robbie Harlock"	
2000	Cold Squad	Young Daniel	Episode: "Life After Death"	
2000	So Weird	Pete	Episode: "Vampire"	
2000	Higher Ground	David Ruxton	3 episodes	
2001	Dead Last	Vaughn Parrish	Main role	
2001	Mentors	Reggie	Episode: "Nothing to Fear"	
2001	SK8	Kevin	Episode: "All Skate"	
2001	Honey, I Shrunk the Kids: The TV Show	Manny	Episode: "Honey, I'm Going to Teach You a Lesson"	
2001	Strange Frequency	Toby	Episode: "More Than a Feeling"	
2002	Smallville	Jeff Palmer	Episode: "Shimmer"	
2002	Dark Angel	Jonathan	Episode: "Love in Vein"	
2002	The Dead Zone	Goth Guy	Episode: "Unreasonable Doubt"	
2003	Dead Like Me	Rich Guggenheim	Episode: "Sunday Mornings"	
2003	24	Tim	2 episodes	
2004	Kingdom Hospital	Paul Morlock / Antubis	Episode: "Series"	
2005	Godiva's	Eddie	Episode: "Fast and Loose"	
2005–2017	Supernatural	Max Jaffe / Alton Morehead	Episodes: "Phantom Traveler" and "The Raid"	
2012	Fringe	Briggs	Episode: "The Human Kind"	
2014	Gotham	Benny	Episode: "Viper"	
2015	The Flash	Eddie Slick / Sand Demon	Episode: "Flash of Two Worlds"	
2015	Blue Bloods	Lukas Gorski	Episode: "Payback"	
2015	Deadbeat	Dark Suit #2	Episode: "Good Will Haunting"	
2015	Jessica Jones	Holden	Episode: "AKA It's Called Whiskey"	
2016	Motive	Dr. Henry Price	Episode: "The Scorpion and the Frog"	
2017–2019	iZombie	Vampire Steve	9 episodes	
2018	The Magicians	Vince	Episode: "Poached Eggs"	
2018	You Me Her	Tucker	Episode: "Tourist Lesbians and Millennial Twats"	
2020–2021	Riverdale	David	3 Episodes	
2021	Nancy Drew	Aristotle	2 Episodes	
2021	The Good Doctor	Benji	Episode: "Dr. Ted"	
2021–2025	Family Law	Yannick Krol	Recurring role	
2024	Earth Abides	Ezra	4 Episodes	
2025	Murder in a Small Town	Warren	Episode: "The Fall of Holman"	

=== Video games ===
- Spider-Man (2000) – Bank Thug Pilot (voice, in cut scene, uncredited)

== Theatre ==
Year	Title	Role	Playwright	Company/Venue	Ref.
2009	Molière, or The League of Hypocrites	Zacharie Moirron / Father Bartholomew	Mikhail Bulgakov	Finborough Theatre	

== Accolades ==
Awards and nominations received by Kett Turton
Year	Award / Festival	Category	Work	Result	Ref.
2000	Leo Awards	Best Actor	Rollercoaster	Nominated	
2001	Phoenix Film Festival	Copper Wing Award - Best Ensemble	Rollercoaster	Won	
2001	Outfest	Grand Jury Award - Best Actor	Gypsy 83	Won	
2006	Leo Awards	Best Supporting Actor	A Simple Curve	Nominated	
