= Paul Rudd on screen and stage =

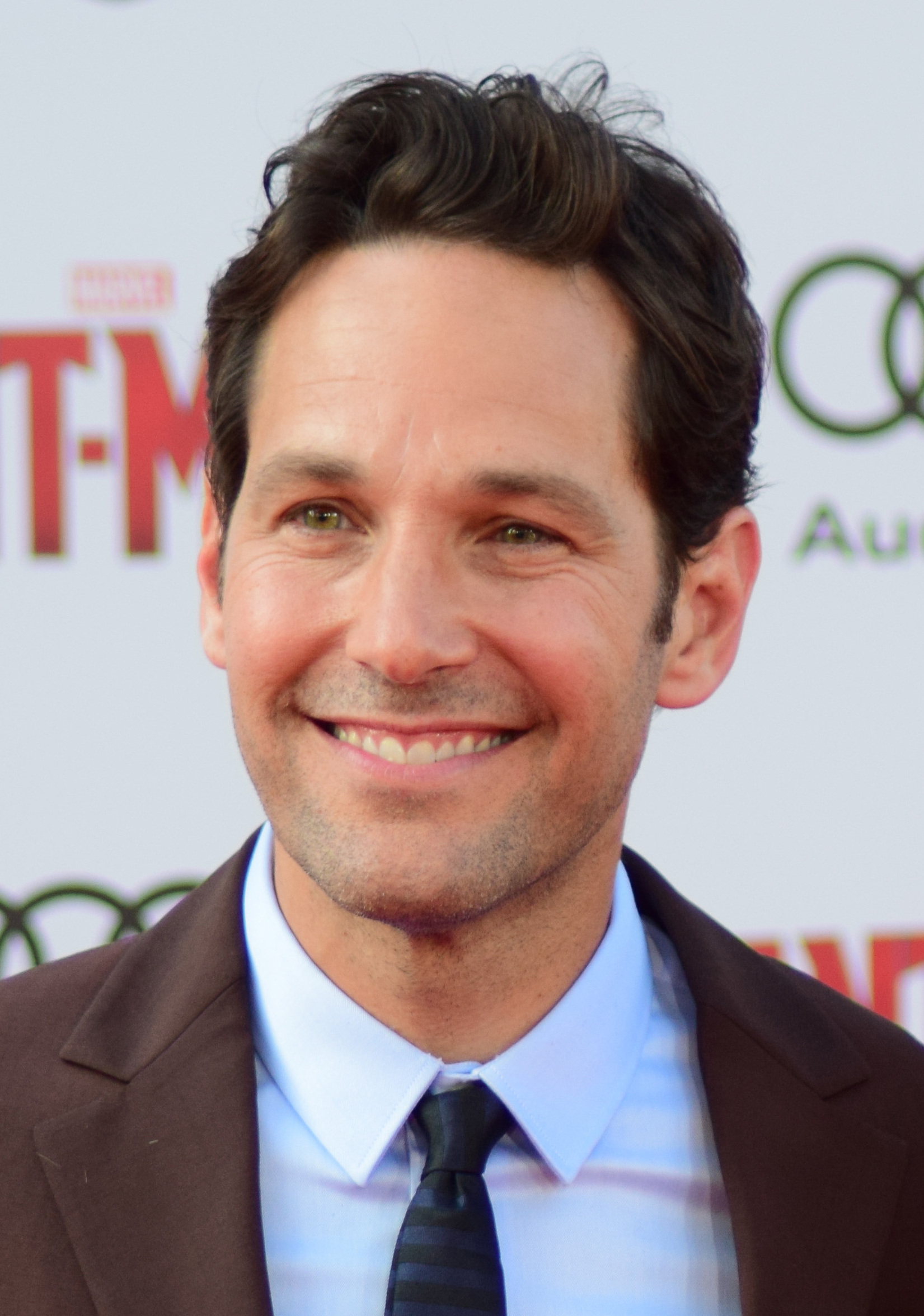
At the Hollywood premiere of Ant-Man in 2015

Paul Rudd is an American actor, writer, and producer. His career began in 1992 when he played a recurring role in the television series Sisters until 1995. In 1995, he made his film debut opposite Alicia Silverstone in the cult film Clueless, and starred as Tommy Doyle in Halloween: The Curse of Michael Myers. The following year, he played Dave Paris in Baz Luhrmann's romantic drama Romeo + Juliet. He co-starred in the ensemble comedy film Wet Hot American Summer (2001), and had further comedic roles in Role Models (2008) with Seann William Scott and I Love You, Man (2009) with Jason Segel.

Rudd has frequently collaborated with filmmaker Judd Apatow in such comedy films as Anchorman: The Legend of Ron Burgundy (2004), The 40-Year-Old Virgin (2005), Knocked Up (2007), Forgetting Sarah Marshall (2008), This Is 40 (2012), and Anchorman 2: The Legend Continues (2013). Since 2015, he has played the superhero Scott Lang / Ant-Man in the Marvel Cinematic Universe (MCU), appearing in Ant-Man (2015), Captain America: Civil War (2016), Ant-Man and the Wasp (2018), Avengers: Endgame (2019), and Ant-Man and the Wasp: Quantumania (2023). He has also starred as the Ghostbuster Gary Grooberson in the supernatural comedy films Ghostbusters: Afterlife (2021) and Ghostbusters: Frozen Empire (2024).

In addition to his film career, Rudd has appeared in numerous television shows, including the NBC sitcom Friends as Mike Hannigan (2002–2004), along with guest roles on Tim and Eric Awesome Show, Great Job! (2012), Reno 911! (2006–2007) and Parks and Recreation as businessman Bobby Newport (2012, 2015, 2020). He has also hosted Saturday Night Live five times. He reprised his role in the Netflix sequel miniseries Wet Hot American Summer: First Day of Camp (2015) and Wet Hot American Summer: Ten Years Later (2017). He played a dual role in the Netflix comedy-drama series Living with Yourself (2019), for which he received a nomination for a Golden Globe Award for Best Actor, and has since co-starred with Will Ferrell in the Apple TV+ black comedy miniseries The Shrink Next Door (2021).

== Film ==
Film
Year	Title	Role	Notes	Ref.
1995	Clueless	Josh Lucas		
1995	Halloween: The Curse of Michael Myers	Tommy Doyle	Credited as Paul Stephen Rudd	
1996	Romeo + Juliet	Dave Paris		
1996	The Size of Watermelons	Alex		
1997	The Locusts	Earl		
1998	Overnight Delivery	Wyatt Trips	Direct-to-video	
1998	The Object of My Affection	George Hanson		
1999	200 Cigarettes	Kevin		
1999	The Cider House Rules	Wally Worthington		
2000	Gen-Y Cops	Ian Curtis		
2001	Wet Hot American Summer	Andy		
2001	On the Edge	Dr. Kenneth Grearly	Short film; Segment: "Reaching Normal"	
2001	The Château	Graham Granville		
2003	The Shape of Things	Adam Sorenson		
2003	2 Days	Paul Miller		
2003	House Hunting	Daniel	Short film	
2004	Anchorman: The Legend of Ron Burgundy	Brian Fantana		
2004	P.S.	Sammy Silverstein		
2004	Wake Up, Ron Burgundy: The Lost Movie	Brian Fantana	Direct-to-DVD	
2005	The Baxter	Dan Abbott		
2005	The 40-Year-Old Virgin	David		
2005	Tennis, Anyone...?	Lance Rockwood		
2006	The Oh in Ohio	Jack Chase		
2006	Diggers	Hunt		
2006	Night at the Museum	Don		
2007	Reno 911!: Miami	Ethan		
2007	I Could Never Be Your Woman	Adam		
2007	The Ex	Leon		
2007	Knocked Up	Pete		
2007	The Ten	Jeff Reigert	Also producer	
2007	Walk Hard: The Dewey Cox Story	John Lennon	Uncredited cameo	
2008	Over Her Dead Body	Henry		
2008	Forgetting Sarah Marshall	Chuck / Kunu		
2008	Role Models	Danny	Also writer	
2009	I Love You, Man	Peter Klaven		
2009	Sesame Street: Being Green	Mr. Earth	Direct-to-DVD	
2009	Monsters vs. Aliens	Derek Dietl	Voice role	
2009	Year One	Abel	Uncredited	
2010	Dinner for Schmucks	Tim		
2010	How Do You Know	George		
2011	Our Idiot Brother	Ned		
2012	Wanderlust	George Gergenblatt	Also producer	
2012	The Perks of Being a Wallflower	Mr. Anderson		
2012	This Is 40	Pete		
2013	Admission	John Pressman		
2013	Prince Avalanche	Alvin		
2013	This Is the End	Himself	Cameo	
2013	All Is Bright	Rene		
2013	Anchorman 2: The Legend Continues	Brian Fantana		
2014	They Came Together	Joel		
2015	The Little Prince	Mr. Prince	Voice role	
2015	Ant-Man	Scott Lang / Ant-Man	Also writer	
2016	Captain America: Civil War	Scott Lang / Ant-Man		
2016	The Fundamentals of Caring	Ben Benjamin		
2016	Sausage Party	Darren	Voice role	
2016	Nerdland	John	Voice role	
2017	Fun Mom Dinner	Brady	Cameo; also executive producer	
2018	The Catcher Was a Spy	Moe Berg		
2018	Ideal Home	Paul		
2018	Mute	Cactus Bill		
2018	Ant-Man and the Wasp	Scott Lang / Ant-Man	Also writer	
2019	Avengers: Endgame	Scott Lang / Ant-Man		
2019	Between Two Ferns: The Movie	Himself		
2021	Ghostbusters: Afterlife	Gary Grooberson		
2021	My Beautiful Stutter	Himself	Also executive producer	
2022	Chip 'n Dale: Rescue Rangers	Himself	Cameo	
2022	The Bob's Burgers Movie	Jericho	Voice role; cameo	
2023	Ant-Man and the Wasp: Quantumania	Scott Lang / Ant-Man		
2023	Teenage Mutant Ninja Turtles: Mutant Mayhem	Mondo Gecko	Voice role	
2024	Ghostbusters: Frozen Empire	Gary Grooberson		
2024	Friendship	Austin Carmichael		
2025	Death of a Unicorn	Elliot Kintner	Also executive producer	
2025	Anaconda	Ronald Griffen "Griff" Jr		
2026	Gail Daughtry and the Celebrity Sex Pass	Himself	Cameo	
2026	Power Ballad	Rick		
2026	Rain Reign	Weldon		
2026	A Statement	Tom Jorling		
2026	Avengers: Doomsday †	Scott Lang / Ant-Man	Post-production	

Key
†	Denotes films that have not yet been released

== Television ==
Television
Year	Title	Role	Notes	Ref.
1992–1995	Sisters	Kirby Philby	Recurring role; credited as Paul Stephen Rudd	
1993	Moment of Truth: Stalking Back	Scott	Television film	
1993	The Fire Next Time	David	1 episode; credited as Paul Stephen Rudd	
1994	Runaway Daughters	Jimmy Rusoff	Television film	
1994	Wild Oats	Brian Grant	Main role	
1996	Clueless	Sonny	Episode: "I Got You Babe"	
2000	Strangers with Candy	Brent Brooks	Episode: "The Last Temptation of Blank"	
2000	The Great Gatsby	Nick Carraway	Television film	
2002–2004	Friends	Mike Hannigan	Recurring role	
2005	Stella	Greg	Episode: "Office Party"	
2006	Cheap Seats	Dave Penders	Episode: "1996 Spelling Bee: Part 2"	
2006	Robot Chicken	Various voice roles	Episode: "Book of Corrine"	
2006–2007	Reno 911!	Guy Gerricault	5 episodes as host, 10 as special guest	
2007	The Naked Trucker and T-Bones Show	Antagonistic Passenger	Episode: "Gold Watch"	
2007	Veronica Mars	Desmond Fellows	Episode: "Debasement Tapes"	
2007	Hard Knocks	Narrator / Himself	Episode: "Training Camp with the Kansas City Chiefs"	
2008	Little Britain USA	French President	Episode: "1.3"	
2008	Wainy Days	Alias	Web series; Episode: "The Pickup"	
2008–2022	Saturday Night Live	Himself / Host	5 episodes	
2009	Delocated	Himself	Episode: "Pilot"	
2009–2010, 2022	Party Down	—N/a	Co-creator, writer and executive producer only	
2010	Tim and Eric Awesome Show, Great Job!	Himself / Various roles	Episode: "Man Milk"	
2011, 2014, 2020	The Simpsons	Dr. Zander / Himself	Voice role; 3 episodes	
2012, 2015, 2020	Parks and Recreation	Bobby Newport	6 episodes	
2012	Comedy Bang! Bang!	Himself	Episode: "Paul Rudd Wears A Red Lumberjack Flannel Shirt"	
2012	Louie	Himself	Episode: "Late Show: Part 3"	
2013	Burning Love	Nate	3 episodes	
2015	The Jack and Triumph Show	Himself	Episode: "Coffee"	
2015	Moone Boy	George Gershwin	Episode: "Gershwin's Bucket List"	
2015	WHIH Newsfront	Scott Lang	2 episodes	
2015	Wet Hot American Summer: First Day of Camp	Andy	Main role	
2015	Neon Joe, Werewolf Hunter	Himself	Episode: "Made Ya Look"	
2016	Bob's Burgers	Jericho	Voice role; Episode: "The Horse Rider-er"	
2016	Travel Man	Himself	Episode: "48 Hours in Helsinki"	
2017	Nightcap	Himself	Episode: "Go-Fund Yourself"	
2017	Wet Hot American Summer: Ten Years Later	Andy	Recurring role	
2018	iZombie	Paul Rudd	Voice role; Episode: "And He Shall Be a Good Man"; uncredited	
2018	The Chris Gethard Show	Himself	Episode: "Stop Apologizing For Your Dream"	
2018	Bumping Mics with Jeff Ross & Dave Attell	Himself	1 episode	
2018–2026	The Late Show with Stephen Colbert	Himself	7 episodes, including the series finale	
2019	Living with Yourself	Miles Elliot	Main role; also executive producer	
2020	Last Week Tonight with John Oliver	Himself	Episode: "Conspiracy Theories"	
2020	Home Movie: The Princess Bride	Westley	Episode: "Chapter Ten: To the Pain!"	
2020	At Home with Amy Sedaris	Melisso Junkins	Episode: "New Year's"	
2020, 2023, 2024	America's Game: The Super Bowl Champions	Narrator	3 episodes	
2020–2021	Tiny World	Narrator / Himself	Main role	
2021–2023	What If...?	Scott Lang / Ant-Man	Voice role; 2 episodes	
2021	The Shrink Next Door	Dr. Isaac Herschkopf	Main role; also executive producer	
2022	The Bear	Ballbreaker Video Game	Uncredited voice cameo; Episode: "Braciole"	
2022–2025	Only Murders in the Building	Ben Glenroy / Glen Stubbins / L.E.S.T.R.	Guest star (season 2), special guest star (season 3–4), voice role (season 5)	
2023	Impractical Jokers	Himself	Episode: "Bret Michaels"	
2024	Secrets of the Octopus	Narrator / Himself	Nature documentary (3 episodes)	
2025	Marvel Zombies	Scott Lang / Ant-Man	Voice role; 2 episodes	
2025	Haha, You Clowns	Todd	Voice role; Episode: "Improv"	
2026	Life, Larry and the Pursuit of Unhappiness	Neil Armstrong	Episode 6 ("Buzz")	

== Stage ==
Stage
Year	Production	Role	Venue	Ref.
1997	The Last Night of Ballyhoo	Joe Farkas	Helen Hayes Theatre	
1998	Twelfth Night	Orsino	Lincoln Center Theater	
2001	The Shape of Things	Adam Sorenson	Almeida Theatre at Kings Cross	
2006	Three Days of Rain	Walker / Ned	Bernard Jacobs Theater	
2012	Craig Wright's Grace	Husband	Cort Theatre	

== See also ==
- List of awards and nominations received by Paul Rudd
