= List of awards and nominations received by Paul Rudd =

Paul Rudd awards and nominations
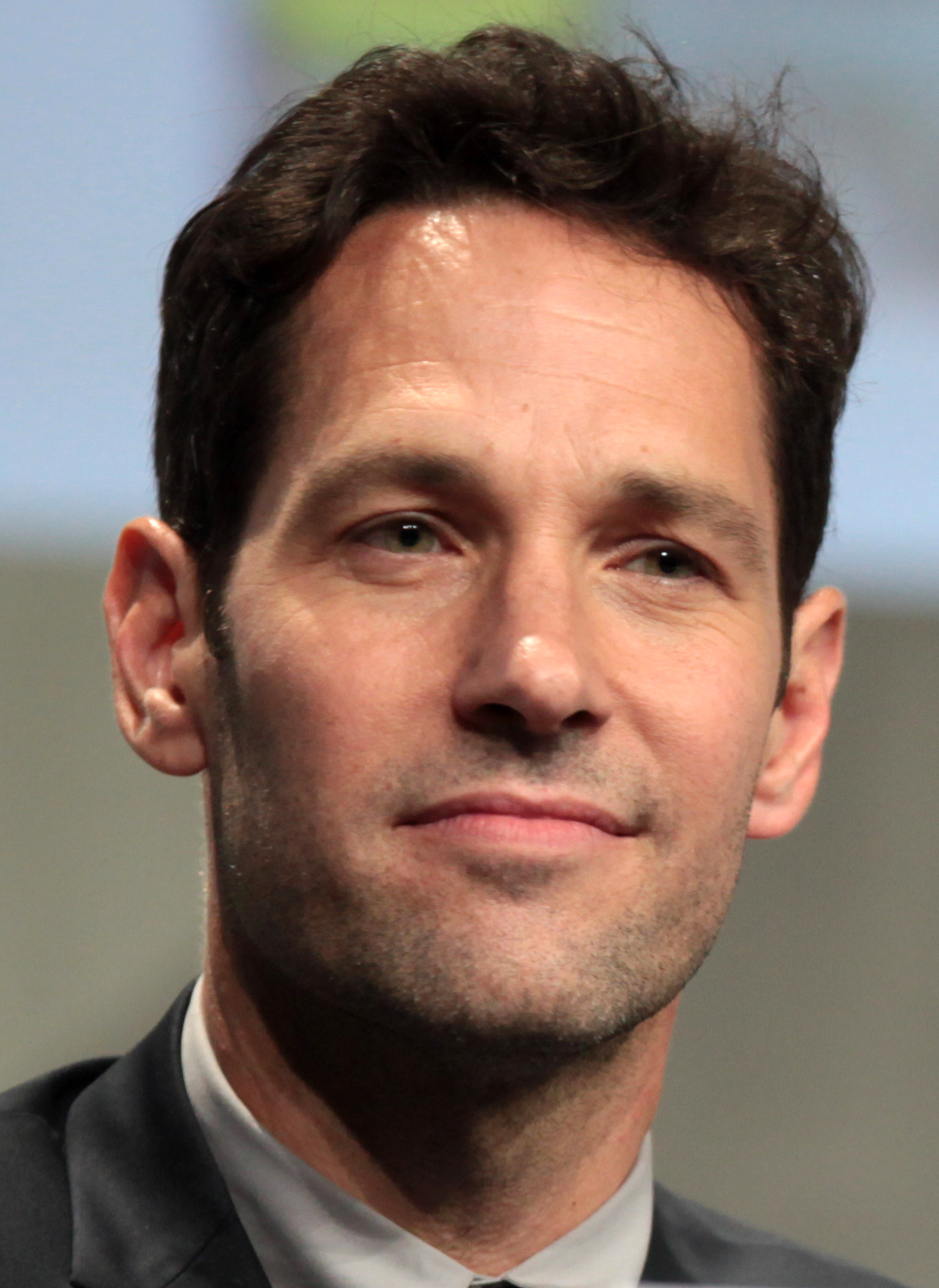
- Rudd at San Diego Comic-Con in 2014
Awards and nominations
Award	Wins	Nominations
Critics' Choice Movie Awards	0	2
Critics' Choice Television Awards	1	2
Golden Globe Awards	0	1
Primetime Emmy Awards	0	2
Screen Actors Guild Awards	0	2

Totals (Note: Certain award groups do not simply award one winner. They acknowledge several different recipients, have runners-up, and have third place. Since this is a specific recognition and is different from losing an award, runner-up mentions are considered wins in this award tally. For simplification and to avoid errors, each award in this list has been presumed to have had a prior nomination.)
- Wins: 6
- Nominations: 31

The following is a list of awards and nominations received by American actor and comedian Paul Rudd.

== Awards and nominations ==
Awards and nominations received by Paul Rudd
Award	Year (Note: Indicates the year of ceremony.)	Nominated work	Category	Result	Ref.
American Film Institute Awards	2009	Party Down	Program of the Year (Note: shared with John Enbom, Dan Etheridge and Rob Thomas)	Won	
CinemaCon Awards	2015	—N/a	Male Star of the Year	Won	
Critics' Choice Movie Awards	2013	This Is 40	Best Actor in a Comedy	Nominated	
Critics' Choice Movie Awards	2016	Ant-Man	Best Actor in an Action Movie	Nominated	
Critics' Choice Television Awards	2012	Parks and Recreation	Best Guest Performer in a Comedy Series	Won	
Critics' Choice Television Awards	2020	Living with Yourself	Best Actor in a Comedy Series	Nominated	
Georgia Film Critics Association Awards	2016	Ant-Man	Oglethorpe Award for Excellence in Georgia Cinema (Note: shared with Joe Cornish, Adam McKay, Peyton Reed and Edgar Wright)	Won	
Golden Globe Awards	2020	Living with Yourself	Best Actor in a Television Series – Musical or Comedy	Nominated	
Jupiter Awards	2016	Ant-Man	Best International Actor	Nominated	
MTV Movie & TV Awards	2005	Anchorman: The Legend of Ron Burgundy	Best Musical Performance (Note: shared with Fred Armisen, Steve Carell and Will Ferrell)	Nominated	
MTV Movie & TV Awards	2005	Anchorman: The Legend of Ron Burgundy	Best On-Screen Team (Note: shared with Steve Carell, Will Ferrell and David Koechner)	Nominated	
MTV Movie & TV Awards	2006	The 40-Year-Old Virgin	Best On-Screen Team (Note: shared with Steve Carell, Romany Malco and Seth Rogen)	Nominated	
MTV Movie & TV Awards	2009	I Love You, Man	Best Kiss (Note: shared with Thomas Lennon)	Nominated	
MTV Movie & TV Awards	2014	Anchorman 2: The Legend Continues	Best Fight (Note: shared with the cast)	Nominated	
MTV Movie & TV Awards	2014	Anchorman 2: The Legend Continues	#WTF Moment (Note: shared with Steve Carell, Will Ferrell and David Koechner)	Nominated	
MTV Movie & TV Awards	2016	Ant-Man	Best Hero	Nominated	
MTV Movie & TV Awards	2023	Ant-Man and the Wasp: Quantumania	Best Hero	Nominated	
MTV Movie & TV Awards	2023	Ant-Man and the Wasp: Quantumania	Best Kick-Ass Cast	Nominated	
Nickelodeon Kids' Choice Awards	2024	Ghostbusters: Frozen Empire	Favorite Movie Actor	Nominated	
Primetime Emmy Awards	2024	Only Murders in the Building	Outstanding Supporting Actor in a Comedy Series	Nominated	
Primetime Emmy Awards	2024	Secrets of the Octopus	Outstanding Narrator	Nominated	
San Diego Film Critics Society Awards	2012	The Perks of Being a Wallflower	Best Ensemble	Won	
Saturn Awards	2016	Ant-Man	Best Actor	Nominated	
Screen Actors Guild Awards	2000	The Cider House Rules	Outstanding Performance by a Cast in a Motion Picture	Nominated	
Screen Actors Guild Awards	2024	Only Murders in the Building	Outstanding Performance by an Ensemble in a Comedy Series	Nominated	
Streamy Awards	2009	Wainy Days	Best Guest Star in a Web Series	Won	
Teen Choice Awards	2007	Knocked Up	Choice Movie: Chemistry (Note: shared with Seth Rogen)	Nominated	
Teen Choice Awards	2009	I Love You, Man	Choice Movie: Rockstar Moment (Note: shared with Jason Segel)	Nominated	
Teen Choice Awards	2015	Ant-Man	Choice Summer Movie Star: Male	Nominated	
Teen Choice Awards	2019	Ant-Man and the Wasp and Avengers: Endgame	Choice Movie Actor: Action	Nominated	

== Other honors ==
Other accolades received by Paul Rudd
Organization	Year	Honor	Ref.
Hasty Pudding Theatricals	2018	Man of the Year	
Hollywood Walk of Fame	2015	Inductee	
People	2021	Sexiest Man Alive	
