= Too Cute =

Too Cute may refer to:

- "Too Cute" (Daria), a 1997 episode of the animated MTV series Daria
- Too Cute (TV series), a 2011 television series on Animal Planet
