= List of Too Cute episodes =

Too Cute is an American television series that aired on Animal Planet from April 30, 2011 to January 2, 2017.

== Series overview ==
Season	Episodes	Originally released	
Season	Episodes	First released	Last released
1	4	April 30, 2011	December 18, 2011
2	6	February 25, 2012	April 7, 2012
3	16	October 13, 2012	March 30, 2013
4	28	August 3, 2013	June 21, 2014
5	14	August 16, 2014	December 27, 2014
6	4	December 15, 2016	January 2, 2017

== Episodes ==
=== Season 1 (2011) ===
No. overall	No. in season	Title	Original release date
1	1	"Kittens"	April 30, 2011
Kitten owners go to great measures to take care of their fiercely independent pets as the birth and first few months of three separate kitten litters are documented in order to record all of the important moments in the kittens' lives. Breeds featured: Persians, Abyssinians, and Bengals.
2	2	"Puppies"	September 17, 2011
The birth and first months of three different litters of puppies are followed; fawning owners do everything they can to accommodate their new pets; adorable moments of puppies' lives are shown as they eat, sleep and play. Breeds featured: Labrador Retrievers, Shih Tzus, and Golden Retrievers.
3	3	"Baby Sloths"	December 17, 2011
The Sloth Sanctuary of Costa Rica is dedicated to rescuing orphaned and injured sloths; extremely endearing baby sloths lead busy lives that are full of activities and learn how their species survives in the wild.
4	4	"Puppies and Kittens"	December 18, 2011

=== Season 2 (2012) ===
No. overall	No. in season	Title	Original release date
5	1	"Puppies and Ducklings"	February 25, 2012
Three delightful litters of puppies come of age; the first few months of Pugs, Australian Shepherds and Rottweilers lives are full of adventure, including an introduction to an agility course and lessons in duck-herding.
6	2	"Kittens and Pocket pets"	March 3, 2012
Featured are the epic adventuresome stories that take place during the first few months in the lives of Savannah, Siberian and Shorthaired kittens; cats grow up in a house full of guinea pigs, turtles and hamsters and run off to discover surprising, new territory.
7	3	"Kitten Dolls"	March 10, 2012
The epic stories of three litters of kittens are followed as they grow from helpless "furballs" into rambunctious, young cats; hairless Sphynxes refine "cute"; Burmese cats explore new heights; tiny Ragdolls befriend German Shepherds.
8	4	"Kitten Cottonballs"	March 17, 2012
Three litters of kittens pounce throughout the first few months of their lives; beautiful American Curl kittens get ready for life on the catwalk; a set of Tonkinese run circles around their mother; a Maine Coon shows his siblings who is boss.
9	5	"Super Fluffy Puppies"	March 24, 2012
Three litters of puppies go from cute to cuter during the first few months of their lives; a trio of Rhodesian Ridgebacks runs circles around their mom; fluffy Chow Chow puppies have heaps of attitude; a Havanese has her paws full with five puppies.
10	6	"Pool Puppies"	March 31, 2012
The coming-of-age stories of three litters are featured; three sweet puppies keep their Jack Russell Terrier mother active; a Portuguese Water Dog finds out that her litter may not be too fond of water; a Bullmastiff mother's four puppies keep growing.

=== Season 3 (2012–13) ===
No. overall	No. in season	Title	Original release date
12	1	"Fluffy Puppies & Baby Goats"	October 13, 2012
Six fluffy Coton de Tulear puppies explore their farm home as one of them, Snowflake, struggles to find her place in the world until she meets Pipsqueak, an awkward baby pygmy goat; a mischievous German Shepherd puppy struggles in obedience class; two playful French Bulldog twins explore the world around them with the help of Angus, their very active father.
13	2	"Jungle Kitties & Baby Skunks"	October 20, 2012
Oreo, a tiny tuxedo kitten meets a similarly attired companion: Nellie the Skunk. Sputnik leads his Russian Blue siblings on a grand adventure. And, Ocicat Freckles tries to keep control of her five mini jungle cats.
14	3	"Fuzzy Polar Puppies"	October 27, 2012
Nanook, a shy Chinook, is the only boy in a litter of four, training to be a sled dog. Rocky, the Labradoodle, and his brother Stanley grow up poolside. And Rollo and Pickle are wiener dogs who aspire to be athletes like their mom, a champion hotdog.
15	4	"Spotted, Pampered Pups"	November 10, 2012
A shy Cavalier King Charles Spaniel is coaxed out of her shell by her peppy aunt. Then, everyone wants to be top dog in the Alaskan Malamute home. Finally, three Dalmatians grow into their spots as they show off their skills at the local fire station.
16	5	"Sweetest Animal Friends"	November 24, 2012
In this "Best of" episode, viewers get a glimpse of the most adorable inter-species animal friendships. From roly-poly Ragdoll kittens and their German Shepherd playmate, to mini-Australian Shepherds and their quacking duckling pals, it's an extravaganza of cute.
17	6	"Fluffy Puppy Party"	December 8, 2012
Pit bull puppy Thor discovers an urban paradise where he can be free; Collie pup Little Magic must learn to keep up with her pack mates; Chinese Crested puppies Bella and Buttons, though opposite in appearance, team up against a strange new creature.
18	7	"Cuddly Kittens"	December 15, 2012
Toyger kitten Tonya overcomes her shy nature to befriend a large housemate. British Shorthair kittens audition for the role of "greeter" at a vet's office. And fluffy Ragamuffin Otto keep household chores at bay.
19	8	"Puppy Love"	December 22, 2012
Raisin, a wrinkled Shar Pei, guards his toys from siblings Peaches and Pancake. Scout, a brave young Cairn Terrier, attempts an adventure all on his own. And Peanut, the smallest of a litter of Boxers, is steered to glory by his grandfather.
20	9	"Extra Special Pets"	February 9, 2013
Five little piggies must befriend Penny the Spaniel and learn their new farm home; Clover, a mini-lop rabbit must assert herself with feisty brother Harley; Samson and Delilah teach their hoglet Pip and her spiky siblings about the great outdoors.
21	10	"Curious Kittens"	February 16, 2013
Calico kittens mingle with canine clientele at a dog-grooming salon where their mother works. Exotic Shorthair kittens are born into the lap of luxury, but soon reveal their mischievous side. And a pair of Tabby kittens explore the great outdoors.
22	11	"Kitten Beauties"	February 23, 2013
Godiva Kiss, a Birman beauty queen, is raising three kittens who may follow in her royal footsteps. Tofu, a Cornish Rex kitten, and his siblings befriend Donna the Iguana. Cutie, a tortoiseshell cat is raising a twin brother and sister pair who are nothing alike.
23	12	"Mighty Munchkins"	March 2, 2013
An adorable showdown takes place between Pucci the Chihuahua and the new Royal Himalayan kittens. Singapura mom Jasmine has a hard time keeping up with her tiny, energetic brood. Short-legged and long legged munchkin siblings navigate the world.
24	13	"Tiny Giants"	March 9, 2013
Puck, a keeshond pup, befriends a flock of ducks on the farm while sister Tulip explores the woodshop. A little Great Dane named Marvin is adjusting to his fast-growing body. Cocker Spaniel pups look the same but certainly don't act the same.
25	14	"Fluff and Feathers"	March 16, 2013
Lab mix rescue pup Sally is never seen far behind brother Safari, Pomeranian triplets Sparrow, Wren and Finch carry on mom Star and dad Tucker's job of watching over a feathered menagerie and Ibizan Hound puppies Carmen, Figaro and Arabella try to out chase each other.
26	15	"Puppy Power"	March 23, 2013
Anya the Doberman pinscher and her human best friend, toddler Kaylee, have a big job keeping up with Anya's 12 new puppies. Runt beagle pup Roo hopes his nose will help him hunt with his sisters. Show dog Bichon Frise Angel breeds her champion brood.
27	16	Fluffiest Kittens	March 30, 2013
In this best-of episode: Bold little Maine coon kitten Lulu tries to help her dad get along with her siblings. Persian kittens prepare to be like their show cat mom, Truly Elegant. Siberian twins Mittens and Socks are rescued from the closet by Maksim, the cat of the house.

=== Season 4 (2013–14) ===
*The "Animal BFFs" specials in this season are 30 minutes long.

No. overall	No. in season	Title	Original release date
28	1	"Puppies and a Piggy"	August 3, 2013
Twelve Goldendoodles take over the household, including the bed of their piggy housemate, Trouble. A West Highland White Terrier pup tries to keep up with her twin brother who is always wandering off. And a batch of Swiss Mountain puppies take a while to find their stride.
29	2	"Tiny Puppies, Big Paws"	August 10, 2013
A foursome of Neapolitan Mastiffs have big paws to fill if they're going to be guard dogs like their mother. A shy chihuahua puppy learns that her tiny family have big hearts. And a litter of seven English Setters compete for first place.
30	3	"Puppies Making Mischief"	August 17, 2013
Artistic Irish Terriers meet their troublesome teen brother; eight corgis help out on the farm; an Akita puppy finds her place among her three tough brothers.
31	4	"Top 20 Puppies"	August 24, 2013
A special edition, counting down the twenty most adorable puppies.
32	5	"Puffy Beach Kitties"	August 31, 2013
A pack of spotted Bengal kittens are bowled over by a lumbering Newfoundland. Four fluffy Norwegian Forest Cats dip their toes in the surf at their neighborhood beach. And, at a rescue home, two kittens find their way into the den mother's heart.
33	6	"Puppies: Growing Up"	September 7, 2013
A special episode, catching up with German Shepherd, French Bulldog and Mini Australian Shepherd litters and finding out where they are now, a year after they were first introduced.
34	7	"Perfectly Precious Puppies"	September 14, 2013
Standard Poodle Bebe wants to explore her country home, but brother Percy keeps holding her back. Basset Hound Max follows his nose to an unlikely friendship. And a hapless Bull Terrier mother tries to rein in her pups' boundless energy.
35	8	"Top 20 Kittens"	September 21, 2013
A special edition, counting down the twenty most adorable kittens.
36	9	"Puppies: Growing Up Fluffy"	September 28, 2013
A special edition, revisiting now grown litters of Rhodesian Ridgebacks, Portuguese Water Dogs and Dachshunds.
37	10	"Rainbow Colored Kittens"	October 5, 2013
In a litter of six Maine Coon kitties, only boy Maurice struggles to fit in with his sisters. A quiet kitten with a limp tries to find his voice in a litter of super-chatty Siamese cats. And a shy black kitten tries to befriend an older butterscotch tabby.
38	11	"Kittens: Growing Up"	October 12, 2013
The Persian, Bengal and British shorthair kitten families, some of the favorite kittens that have been featured, are all grown up and are revisited to learn what challenges they faced in their new homes and watch them reunite with old playmates.
39	12	"Roly-Poly Puppies"	October 19, 2013
A shy Papillon puppy named Kitty comes out of her shell with the help of her siblings. A trio of St. Bernard puppies follow their noses to big adventures. And finally, an Airedale Terrier named Merlin tries to disappear from her eight brothers and sisters.
40	13	"Little Wildcats"	October 26, 2013
A black and white kitten named Moo goes head to head with his adopted brother, a baby skunk. Gus, an orange tabby kitten, tries to befriend his canine housemate. And an adventurous Savannah kitten seeks out an equally brave playmate.
41	14	"Big Jobs, Little Paws"	November 2, 2013
Four tiny Tibetan Spaniels (all boys) are born into a family of watchdogs. An extra large litter of Newfoundland puppies take to the water as they train to be rescue dogs. And a patchwork puppy tries to blend into a family of Retriever Mixes.
42	15	"Animal BFFs – Cuddly Bear, Cautious Kangaroo*"	November 9, 2013
A bear cub befriends a lonely German Shepherd. A deer and a kangaroo have their world turned upside down by a mischievous lemur. And a pygmy goat has a hard time fitting in until he meets a shy puppy.
43	16	"Animal BFFs – Baby Baboon, Teacup Pig*"	November 16, 2013
A baby Baboon is taken under the wing of a Golden Retriever. A Teacup Pig and a Flemish Rabbit sneak away from their day jobs and get into trouble. And an adventurous goat and a timid lamb break out of their everyday routine.
44	17	"Fuzzy Puppy Stars"	November 23, 2013
Star-struck Snow is a Great Pyrenees puppy who dreams of following in her movie star mom's paw prints. A pair of Border Collie pups will need to be brave if they're going to be champion herders. And a Scottish Terrier tries to win over the resident cat.
45	18	"Puppy and Kitten Holiday Special"	December 21, 2013
In this special episode, three litters of kittens and puppies celebrate their first Christmas. Breeds featured: Snowshoe kittens, Weimaraner puppies, and Brussels Griffon puppies.
46	19	"Mighty Mountain Puppies"	February 9, 2014
Two Bernese Mountain Dog pups bond with their barnyard neighbors. A trio of Shiba Inu girls challenge their mom with their messy ways. And, in a litter of mixed breed Chatham Hill Retrievers, a young pup takes after his boisterous dad.
47	20	"Chilled Out Pups"	February 15, 2014
Tempest, a hostess at a dog spa, must teach her 10 Whippet pups the path to tranquility. A mixed breed pup tries to find his place among his trio of sisters. And, a litter of 13 Black Russian Terriers turn their mom's serene life upside down.
48	21	"Pint-Sized: Pups and a Ferret"	March 1, 2014
A Miniature Schnauzer pup tries to befriend a high-spirited ferret. A Maltipoo pushes the boundaries set by her young parents. And, a German Shorthaired Pointer pup wants to prove the she’s the ultimate hunting dog, but is shown up by a cat.
49	22	"Kittens in Wonderland"	March 8, 2014
A litter of tabby kittens befriend a bearded dragon. A Burmese named Alice leads her brothers on an adventure to a kitty wonderland. And the runt of a litter of Siberian kittens pals around with a miniature horse called Kitty.
50	23	"Fluffy Pups and Tater Tots"	March 15, 2014
A Chesapeake Bay Retriever is convinced he's the alpha dog, but his big cousin isn't about to roll over. Miniature Poodle Tater Tot is determined to prove that he's the equal of his bigger, louder brothers. And a fussy Samoyed befriends a Dalmatian.
51	24	"Tiny Watchdogs"	March 22, 2014
A litter of Yorkshire Terriers squabble with a flock of Guinea hens. A Lagotto Romagnolo named Pippa deals with the sudden arrival of four newborn siblings. And, two young pups - a German Shepherd and a Labrador Retriever, train as seeing-eye dogs.
52	25	"Musical Kittens"	April 5, 2014
A Turkish Van mom needs the help of a canine companion to keep her kittens in check. Six European Burmese born into a musical home make up for their small size with loud voices. And, a pair of Persians with different parenting styles raise a trio.
53	26	"Supersized Pups"	April 12, 2014
A Rat Terrier pup tries to find his place on a ranch full of rambunctious siblings. A stylish Briard named Fresco has to learn to take care of her 10 supersized pups. And finally, a Japanese Chin named Carly tries to spin her way into the spotlight.
54	27	"Little Lion Pups"	April 19, 2014
A Bullmastiff puppy sticks to his aunt's side as he tries to follow in her footsteps and become a guard dog. A pair of Lowchen pups seek out additional family members. And, an Old English Sheepdog finds himself being herded by tiny sister.
55	28	"Kittens and Canines"	June 21, 2014
A litter of orphaned kittens trail a pair of Dandie Dinmont Terriers. The only girl in a litter of four American Bobtails hunts for her place in the pack. And finally, a naughty Tonkinese kitten proves a handful for her prim and proper mom.

=== Season 5 (2014) ===
*The "Pint-Size" episodes in this season are 30 minutes long.

No. overall	No. in season	Title	Original release date
56	1	"Pint-Sized: Tubby Puppies"	August 16, 2014
Dexter, an English Bulldog who has aspirations to rise above his lazy siblings attempts to prove himself on the agility course. Then, a pack of pups who were rescued from the city streets find themselves in a barnyard full of strange beasts.
57	2	"Pint-Size: Chatty Kitties"	August 16, 2014
A siamese named Chester searches for a little peace and quiet away from his eight chatty siblings. While working mom (and former Too Cute featured kitten from Season 3's 'Cuddly Kittens') Pippa tries to balance her own litter of six tiny British Shorthairs with her job at a cat clinic.
58	3	"Pint-Sized: Kitten Puffs"	August 23, 2014
In a cozy cabin, a pair of Siberian soul mates' relationship is put to the test with the birth of their fireball son Calvin. While at a cats only grooming salon, a Turkish Angora kitten named Izzie has to balance her personal style with life in the salon.
59	4	"Pint-Size: Muddy Puppies"	August 23, 2014
At a small farmhouse an adventurous Cairn Terrier named Doogie attempts to befriend a finicky house cat. While a pristine pack of Samoyed pups have to decide whose rules they'd rather follow – their tidy mom or their messy dad.
60	5	"Pint-Sized: Puppy Giants"	August 30, 2014
An English Mastiff puppy named Dot searches for a little independence from her sister Olive. And Niles, a Small Munsterlander, tries to live up to his breed's reputation as top notch hunting dogs, despite the distraction of his fun-loving mom.
61	6	"Pint-Sized: Puppies and Prickles"	August 30, 2014
In the countryside, a German Shepherd mom is training her troop of seven pups to be Search and Rescue dogs. While in the big city an African Pygmy Hedgehog named Prickle is looking for a soft and cuddly companion in a house full of Havanese puppies.
62	7	"Pint-Sized: Sock Puppies"	September 6, 2014
In a pack of nine Spinone Italianos, there's only one thing that keeps a timid pup named Wally calm: his security sock. While a few miles away, a mischievous Pug named Oskar is a constant handful for his orderly librarian mom.
63	8	"Pint-Sized: Puppy Posse"	September 6, 2014
A Siberian Husky has declared himself the leader of the pack, but he'll need to back up his bravado with some real sledding smarts. And in a litter of a dozen Irish Red and White Setters, a little runt named Lil has to prove she can keep up.
64	9	"Pint-Sized: Puppy Surprise"	September 13, 2014
At an urban Animal Shelter, a Maltese mix named Coco has a surprise litter, led by bold, only-boy Ralphie. While in the country, a restless Ragdoll kitten named Jolene might be more than her laid-back mom can handle.
65	10	"Pint-Sized: Cuddly Kittens"	September 13, 2014
A pair of Shetland Sheepdogs are concerned that their only pup is getting distracted by the farm's resident Pomeranian Gino. Plus, in a litter full of tailless Manx, one kitten named Charlie is born with a tail and needs to figure out he fits in.
66	11	"Pint-Sized: Fab & Furless Kittens"	September 20, 2014
In a home full of crafting supplies, an Abyssinian kitten gets into absolutely everything. Meanwhile, a hairless Elf kitten named Pixie finds herself left out by her five rambunctious brothers and searches for a friend in furrier places.
67	12	"Pint-Sized: Puppy Pros"	September 20, 2014
In a small town, a dog about town named Izzy brings a rare litter of Portuguese Podengo Pequeno pups into the world, led by go-getter Gisele. Meanwhile, an octuplet of Cockapoos train to be therapy dogs.
68	13	"#MerryCuteness"	December 24, 2014
This 2014 Christmas special contains archived footage of the entire series set to Christmas music. There is no narration in this episode.
69	14	"Holiday Special"	December 27, 2014

=== Season 6 (2016–17) ===
*The "Pint-Size" episodes in this season are 30 minutes long.

No. overall	No. in season	Title	Original release date
70	1	"Pint-Sized: Shy Kitties"	December 15, 2016
In a cozy home of Himalayans, a shy kitten named Hugo follows in his father's footsteps. While a rags to riches rescue mix brings her brood of puppies to their new dream home and only girl, Honey, makes an unlikely friend.
71	2	"Rescue Kittens"	December 15, 2016
A pair of rescue kittens are welcomed into their foster home by a cat-loving rescue dog named Sweet Potato. While a Rhodesian Ridgeback pup named Rosie discovers, with the help of a lively older cousin, that swimming can be a whole lot of fun.
72	3	"Pint-Sized: Super Pups"	January 2, 2017
Twin Dachshund pups, Lulu and Betty, discover their different personalities with a little bit of guidance from their free spirit father. While a show pup in training, Chinese Crested puppy, Dotty, forms an unlikely friendship with rescue Pit bull Bryan.
73	4	"Pint-Sized: Graceful Giants"	January 2, 2017
In the lush suburbs, Chip, a Golden Retriever pup, tries to get in the middle of the action while a Great Dane born to an agility star mom finds her long legs aren't so conducive to being agile.
