= Brian Skerry =

American film producer and photojournalist

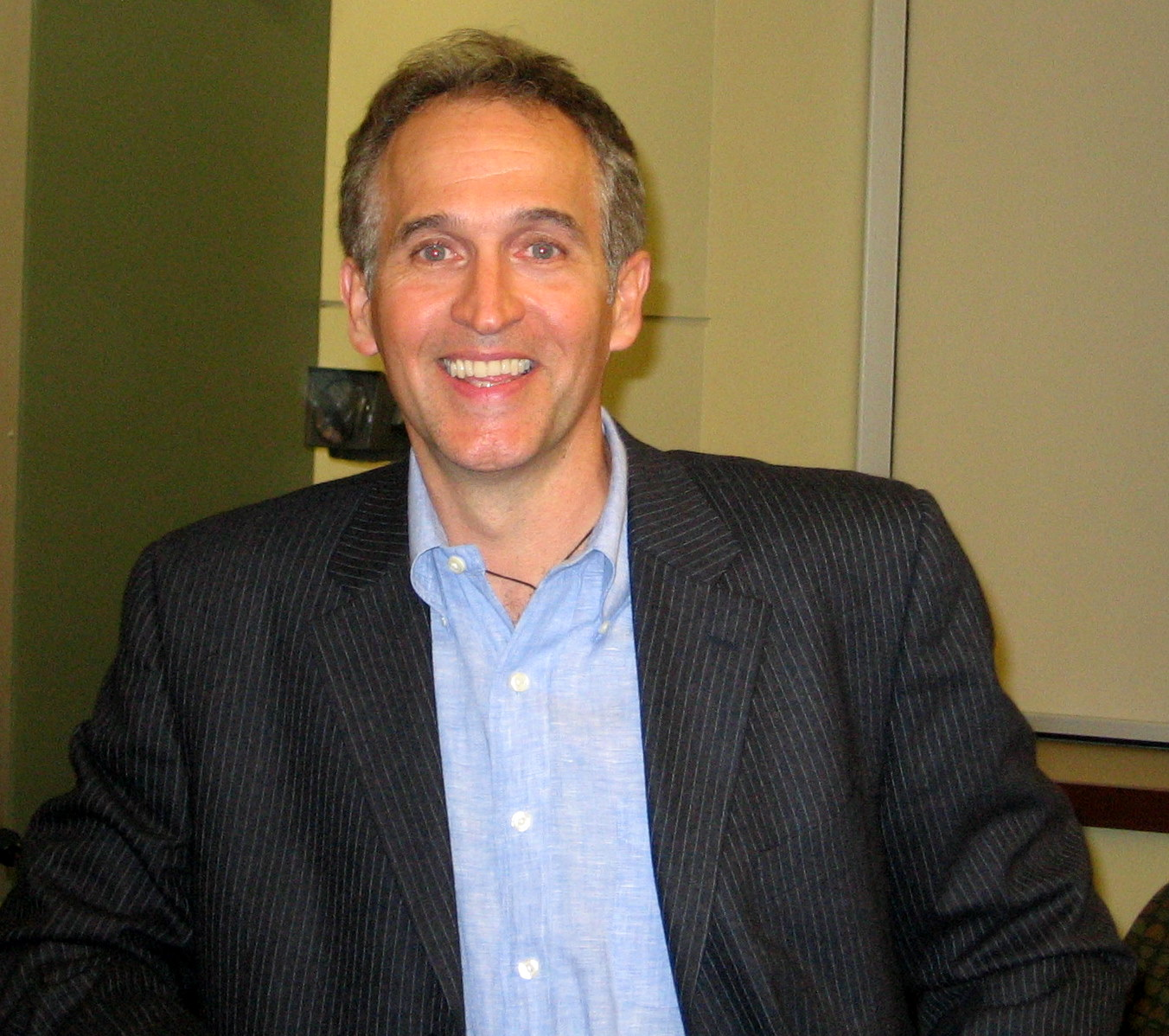
- Skerry at Boston University c. 2011
- Born: 1961 (age 64–65); Milford, Massachusetts
- Education: B.A. in Media and Communications, Worcester State College (1984)
- Occupations: Underwater photographer; Film producer
- Employer: Freelancer
- Known for: National Geographic photography
- Notable work: Secrets of the Whales
- Awards: Primetime Emmy Award; 2021 Outstanding Documentary or Nonfiction Series – Producer
- Website: brianskerry.com

Brian Skerry is an American photojournalist and film producer specializing in marine life and ocean environments. Since 1998 he has been a contributing photographer for National Geographic magazine with more than 30 stories to his credit, including seven covers. In 2021 Skerry won a Primetime Emmy Award for his role as producer in the miniseries, Secrets of the Whales.

== Early life and education ==
Skerry was born in Milford, Massachusetts in 1961, and grew up in Uxbridge. Skerry began SCUBA diving in 1977, at 15 years old and received his first SCUBA certification in 1978. He has stated that he was drawn to the water from a very young age and was always fascinated by ocean documentaries, along with the movies Jaws (1975) and The Deep (1977)

After studying at Quinsigamond Community College, where he earned an associate degree in Liberal Arts, he went on to Worcester State College earning a Bachelor of Science degree in Communications Media in 1984.

== Career ==
Skerry worked on a diving charter boat based on the coast of Rhode Island from 1982–1992, taking divers out to explore New England shipwrecks. His early photography focused on marine life and shipwrecks. His first published photograph was in 1984 in The Boston Globe newspaper, an image of a shipwreck in Boston Harbor. During the 1990s he published photos and wrote stories for a variety of scuba diving magazines. His first book was published in 1995, Complete Wreck Diving, with co-author Henry Keatts. In 1996 he was the first to photograph a living Oarfish, an animal that inspired sea serpent legends. In 2015 Skerry was named a Nikon Ambassador (United States).

=== National Geographic ===
In 1998 Skerry received his first assignment for National Geographic. In a 2021 article in The Maine Magazine, Skerry recalls Bill Curtsinger, one of the first underwater photographers, turning down a National Geographic magazine photo shoot of the 1717 pirate shipwreck Whydah Gally, buried in the sand off Cape Cod. Curtsinger turned down the job due to a scheduling conflict but put in a good word for Skerry, who in turn, took the story assignment. Skerry had his photos published in the May 1999 edition of National Geographic.

Skerry has been credited with more than 30 stories for National Geographic, including seven on the front cover of the magazine.^{a} The subjects of his stories have included species such as harp seals, squid, right whales, Leatherback sea turtles, bluefin tuna, dolphins and coral reefs. Other stories have featured locations such as the Southern Line Islands, Ireland, Marine reserves of New Zealand, the Phoenix Islands, Japan, the Mesoamerican Reef, and in his home state, the Gulf of Maine.

In 2016 National Geographic published three consecutive stories photographed by Skerry about sharks. While on assignment for National Geographic on September 1, 2016, he photographed U.S. President Barack Obama snorkeling in the waters off Midway Atoll in the Pacific Ocean, which lies within the Papahānaumokuākea Marine National Monument. It was the first photograph ever taken of a President of the United States underwater.

==== Secrets of the Whales ====
Orca, a whale featured in the miniseries co-produced by Skerry, Secrets of the Whales.

Secrets of the Whales was a multi-platform project Skerry created for National Geographic in 2017 about the science of whale culture. He credits the work of Canadian whale biologist Shane Gero as his inspiration for this project. Skerry proposed the project to National Geographic magazine, National Geographic Television and National Geographic Books and each division approved their respective project.

The cover story in National Geographic magazine appeared in the May 2021 issue, written by Craig Welch and photographed by Skerry. A book was published in April 2021 by National Geographic Books with the same name, written and photographed by Skerry. The four part miniseries, executive produced by James Cameron and narrated by Sigourney Weaver, premiered April 22, 2021, on Disney+. Skerry produced and starred in the miniseries, as well as providing underwater cinematography.

The documentary series was nominated for three Primetime Emmy Awards by the Academy of Television Arts & Sciences. On September 19, 2021 the miniseries was a winner in the category Outstanding Documentary or Nonfiction Series which was awarded to Skerry and the producers of the show. The film was also nominated for two awards from the Online Film & Television Association for best narration and Best Cinematography in a Variety, Sketch, Nonfiction, or Reality Program. At the Jackson Wild 2021 Media Awards Secrets of the Whales was awarded Winner: Limited Series and at the 2021 Environmental Film Festival in the Nation's Capital, Skerry was awarded the Shared Earth Foundation Award for Advocacy.

==== First Underwater photo of a Great White in Maine ====
On July 8, 2025, while on assignment for National Geographic, Skerry captured what is believed to be the first-ever underwater photograph of a Great white shark off the coast of Maine. About 15 miles from Harpswell, in the Gulf of Maine, Skerry encountered a juvenile female roughly 10 feet long. “She moved… within maybe four feet of me,” he recalled. He managed to slide into the water and frame the shot before the shark quietly vanished after a three‑minute encounter. After more than 10,000 hours spent exploring marine life beneath the waves, this shot marked a milestone not just for Skerry but for marine science in Maine, offering underwater evidence of great white presence that until now had only been hinted at by tagged individuals and surface sightings.

===== First video of shark depredation =====
Skerry is the first person to have captured on video a behavior known as shark depredation. The footage, captured exclusively for National Geographic, was shot in the waters off the Cape Cod peninsula in Massachusetts.

Skerry is quoted as stating the video backs up what fishermen have told him is occurring in the water: predators appear to be associating fishing with easy meals.

Recreational fishermen are noticing that juvenile great whites are actually sort of stealing fish off these fishing lines. They've been seeing an increased number of these, what they call depredations, where the sharks are now coming in and taking that fish off their line.

— Brian Skerry, ABC News

=== PBS ===
==== Sea Change: The Gulf of Maine ====
Sea Change: The Gulf of Maine is a 3-Part, PBS NOVA special, documentary television series produced by Brian Skerry, Chun-Wei Yi, and Stella Cha that debuted in July 2024.

Focused on the Gulf of Maine, the Gulf of Maine is a 36,000 square mile body of water stretching from Cape Cod, Massachusetts to Nova Scotia, Canada that is warming 97% faster than the rest of the global ocean.

Sea Change blends science, exploration, natural history, and stories of human experience, to show how events in the Gulf of Alaska could have global implications. The series features the wilderness and wildlife of these waters. The series also documents a range of people including scientists, Native Americans, fishers, and entrepreneurs working to reveal the Gulf’s history and to understand the ocean's role. It is a regional story with global implications.

== Conservation ==
In 2012 Skerry partnered with the Conservation Law Foundation in Boston to create The New England Ocean Odyssey.

Skerry lectures on issues of visual storytelling and ocean conservation and exploration, having presented at venues including The United Nations General Assembly, The World Economic Forum in Davos, Switzerland, TED Talks, The National Press Club in Washington, DC, The Royal Geographical Society in London and the Sydney Opera House in Australia. He's been a guest on several television programs including CBS This Morning, Nightline, Anderson Cooper Full Circle and is a frequent guest on radio shows and podcasts.

Skerry is a Founding Fellow of the International League of Conservation Photographers, and the Explorer-In-Residence at the New England Aquarium.

== Awards and recognition ==
"At the end of five hours in the cold water... I had this one chance and one frame and that one instant. I was ready. It came down to one second. That is the beauty of photography. It's a moment in time and it vanishes like a ghost but if you have a photo, you have it forever."

— Skerry, Brian

- 11-time award winner of Wildlife Photographer of the Year from the Natural History Museum, London.
- 5-time award winner of Pictures of the Year International from Missouri School of Journalism
- (2012) Peter Benchley Ocean Awards for Excellence in Media
- (2016) Photographer's Photographer Award - National Geographic
- (2017) Rolex National Geographic explorer of the year - National Geographic
- (2019) NOGI Awards - Art - Academy of Underwater Arts & Sciences
- (2022) Doctor of Humane Letters, Honoris Causa - Worcester State University
- (2025) NANPA’s Outstanding Nature Photographer of Year Award

=== Secrets of the Whales ===
Awards for the miniseries, Secrets of the Whales for which Skerry was a Producer.

- (2021) Winner - Academy of Television Arts & Sciences - Outstanding Documentary or Nonfiction Series
- (2021) Winner - Jackson Wild 2021 Media Awards Limited Series
- (2021) Winner - Environmental Film Festival in the Nation's Capital, Shared Earth Foundation Award for Advocacy

== Exhibitions ==
- (2012) National Geographic Museum "Ocean Soul" (Traveling exhibit), Washington, D.C.
- (2013) Smithsonian National Museum of Natural History "Portraits of the Planet: The photography of Brian Skerry", Washington, D.C.
- (2014) United Nations Office at Geneva "Wild and Precious Exhibit" - Geneva, Switzerland
- (2017) National Geographic Museum "Sharks: On Assignment with Brian Skerry" (Traveling exhibit), Washington, D.C.
- (2021) Visa pour l'Image "Photo festival", Perpignan, France
- (2023) Bercy Village "Planet Ocean: Free Exhibition by Yann Arthus-Bertrand and Brian Skerry", Paris, France

== Bibliography ==
=== National Geographic cover stories ===
Skerry has seven published photographs on the cover of National Geographic.^{a}

Cover stories
#	Title	Year	About	Location	Ref
1	Harp Seals	2004	Harp seals	Canada	
2	The Global Fish Crisis: Still Waters	2007	Commercial, Industrial overfishing	Global	
3	The Global Fish Crisis: Blue Haven	2007	Marine reserves of New Zealand	New Zealand	
4	It's Time for a Conversation	2015	Dolphin cognition	Global	
5	Saving the Seas	2017	President Obama; Protecting U.S. Oceans	Atlantic; Pacific; Caribbean; Gulf of Mexico	
6	Secrets of the Whales	2021	Whale culture	Global	
7	2021 The Year in Pictures	2022	Grey seal	New England	
8	Gulf of Maine	2024	Gulf of Maine	New England and Canada	

=== Books ===
Books
#	Title	Year	Author	Publisher	ISBN
1	Complete Wreck Diving: A Guide to Diving Wrecks	1995	Skerry, Brian; Keatts, Henry	Aqua Quest Publications	ISBN 978-1-88165-230-4
2	A Whale On Her Own: The True Story of Wilma the Beluga Whale	2000	Skerry, Brian	Blackbirch Press	ISBN 978-1-56711-431-7
3	Successful Underwater Photography	2002	Skerry, Brian; Hall, Howard	Amphoto Books	ISBN 978-0-81745-927-7
4	Adventure Beneath the Sea: Living in an Underwater Science Station	2010	Skerry, Brian; Mallory, Kenneth	Boyds Mills Press	ISBN 978-1-59078-607-9
5	Face to Face With Manatees	2010	Skerry, Brian	National Geographic Books	ISBN 978-1-42630-617-4
6	Ocean Soul	2011	Skerry, Brian	National Geographic Books	ISBN 978-1-42620-816-4
7	From Above And Below: Man And The Sea	2013	Skerry, Brian; Arthus-Bertrand, Yann	Thames & Hudson	ISBN 978-0-50051-690-4
8	Ocean Counting	2013	Skerry, Brian; Lawless, Janet	National Geographic Books	ISBN 978-1-42631-116-1
9	The Whale Who Won Hearts	2014	Skerry, Brian; Zoehfeld, Kathleen Weidner	National Geographic Books	ISBN 978-1-42631-520-6
10	Shark	2017	Skerry, Brian	National Geographic Books	ISBN 978-1-42621-910-8
11	The Ultimate Book of Sharks	2018	Skerry, Brian; Carney, Elizabeth; Flynn, Sarah Wassner	National Geographic Books	ISBN 978-1-42633-071-1
12	Secrets of the Whales	2021	Skerry, Brian	National Geographic Books	ISBN 978-1-42622-187-3
13	The Ultimate Book of Whales	2025	Skerry, Brian; Stephanie Warren Drimmer	National Geographic Books	ISBN 978-1-42637-526-2

=== Film, Television and video ===
Film
Title	Year	Format	Distributor	About	Role	Awards
Hitler's lost sub	2000	Streaming	PBS	German U-boat	Videographer	
Close Encounters of the Giant Kind	2009	Streaming	Nat Geo Channel	Right whale	Self	
A Magical Day with a Right Whale	2011	Streaming	Nat Geo Channel	Southern right whale	Self	
The Amazing Squid	2012	Streaming	Nat Geo Channel	Caribbean reef squid	Self	
The Mermaid Myth	2012	Streaming	Nat Geo Channel	Manatees	Self	
Brian Skerry: Ocean Soul	2012	Streaming	Nat Geo Channel	Marine life	Self	
Why great white sharks are a mystery to scientists	2016	News media	CBS Mornings	Great white sharks	Self	
Bluefin	2016	Documentary	Film Board of Canada	Bluefin tuna	Self	
Sea of Hope	2017	Documentary	Nat Geo Channel	World's oceans	Self	
Mission Critical: Sharks Under Attack	2019	Documentary	Nat Geo Channel	Sharks	Self	
Shark Edan	2020	Documentary	Nat Geo Channel	Sharks	Self	
The Ocean's Glory - and Horror	2019	Streaming	TED	Underwater photography	Self	
Brian Skerry showcases life under the sea	2021	News media	CBS Mornings	New England Aquarium	Self	
Secrets of the Whales	2021	Miniseries	Red Rock Films; Nat Geo Channel; Disney+	Whales	Producer; Photographer; Self	Emmy
Return of the White Shark	2023	Documentary	National Geographic channel & Disney+	Great white sharks	Producer	
Sea Change: The Gulf of Maine	2024	Television documentary	PBS Nova	Gulf of Maine	Producer; Photographer; Creator; Self	
Jaws @ 50: The Definitive Inside Story	2025	Television documentary	National Geographic channel & Disney+	Jaws (film)	Self	

== Notes ==
a. Eight articles in seven issues. There are two articles in the same issue (April 2007).
b. There were four versions of this issue of the magazine, each with a different photograph. Skerry's cover photo was one of these four.
