= Sea Change: The Gulf of Maine =

American documentary series

- Genre: Television documentary
- Created by: Brian Skerry
- Written by: Chun-Wei Yi; Stella Cha
- Directed by: Chun-Wei Yi; Stella Cha
- Country of origin: United States
- Original language: English
- No. of episodes: Three

Production
- Producers: Brian Skerry; John Bredar
- Editors: Bryan Sullivan; Erin Cumming; Tim Wanlin; Chun-Wei Yi
- Running time: 3 hours (180 minutes)
- Production companies: GBH; So World Media; Vision Maker Media

Original release
- Network: PBS
- Release: July 24, 2024

Sea Change: The Gulf of Maine is a 2024 American television documentary which premiered nationwide on July 24, 2024. The PBS Nova film, comprising three episodes of one hour each, is written and directed by Chun-Wei Yi and Stella Cha. The shows' concept creator and producer is National Geographic photographer, Brian Skerry. Sea Change investigates the warming of this particular body of water that is occurring 97 percent faster than the rest of the ocean. It examines the implications for the Gulf of Maine, including its impact on the local marine life, jobs reliant on the ecosystem, and the millions of people living along its shores.

Sea Change intertwines science, exploration, natural history, and tales of human experiences to illustrate potential global implications of events in the Gulf of Maine. The series allows viewers to witness the remarkable wilderness and wildlife that thrive in these waters. Additionally, it documents the diverse range of people, including scientists, Native Americans, fishers, and entrepreneurs, who are striving to uncover the Gulf's complex history and understand the ocean's role in all of our lives.

Sea Change will also be featured in a six-episode digital series created by indigenous filmmakers in partnership with Vision Maker Media and NOVA. The series will highlight climate issues and present solutions in native communities across North America, aiming to raise awareness and inspire positive change.

== Episodes ==
No.	Title	Original release date
1	"Bounty in the Gulf of Maine"	July 24, 2024
The Gulf of Maine and its resources were significantly impacted by European settlers. This episode reveals how centuries of both ingenious and often disastrous developments resulted in an unsustainable exploitation. As the Gulf warms at a rate faster than 97 percent of the global ocean, we can observe how both people and wildlife are struggling, or in some cases, failing to adapt to these rapid changes.
2	"Peril"	July 31, 2024
Cashes Ledge is a remote and relatively pristine part of the Gulf that is home to an unimaginable array of Marine life. Researchers are conducting a study of the area to gain a better understanding of how its cold waters, unique tides, and geological formations provide support for over 3,000 species, spanning from microscopic plankton to massive right whales.
3	"Survival"	August 7, 2024
We are at a crucial point for the future of the Gulf of Maine and our world's oceans. Whether it's indigenous scholars leading conservation efforts, scientists monitoring the latest developments, or entrepreneurs discovering new ways to sustainability use the sea, people are forging a new path in these dynamic waters.

== See also ==
- List of Nova episodes
- Climate change in Maine
