= Secrets of the Whales =

- Genre: Nature documentary
- Created by: Brian Armstrong; Andy Mitchell
- Written by: Brian Armstrong; Andy Mitchell
- Directed by: Brian Armstrong; Andy Mitchell
- Narrated by: Sigourney Weaver
- Composer: Raphaelle Thibaut
- Original language: English
- No. of seasons: 1
- No. of episodes: 4

Production
- Executive producers: James Cameron; Maria Wilhelm; Shannon Malone-deBenedictis; Pamela Caragol
- Producers: Kevin Krug; Sam Legrys; Brian Skerry
- Cinematography: Brian Armstrong; Andy Mitchell
- Production company: Red Rock Films

Original release
- Network: National Geographic Channel; Disney+

Secrets of the Whales is a nature documentary television series that depicts a variety of whale species in a variety of habitats. The first episode aired April 22, 2021, on National Geographic, as well as being released on Disney+. It was filmed across 24 locations and took 3 years in production. Brian Skerry originated the show concept in 2008, after writing an article for National Geographic about endangered whale species. Executive produced by James Cameron, it is the first in his "Secrets of" series, followed by Secrets of the Elephants, Secrets of the Octopus and Secrets of the Bees.

The series won the 2021 Primetime Creative Arts Emmy Award for Outstanding Documentary or Nonfiction Series. It received positive review from critics.

== Premise ==
The television series follows the life, culture, and behavior of different whale species across the globe.

=== Featured whales ===
Featured whales
Name	Image	Family	Location	Size
Orca		Oceanic dolphin	Prefer cold water oceans.	
Humpback Whale		Rorqual	Feeding in polar waters and migrating to tropical waters	
Beluga whale		Monodontidae	Arctic and subarctic ocean.	
Narwhal		Monodontidae	Arctic Ocean; Canada; Russia	
Sperm whale		Physeteroidea	Migrating seasonally for feeding and breeding.	

== Episodes ==
No.	Title	Directed by	Written by	Original release date
1	"Orca Dynasty"	Brian Armstrong & Andy Mitchell	Brian Armstrong & Andy Mitchell	April 22, 2021
Orcas display differing survival strategies across the world. In New Zealand waters, a mother teachers her offspring to catch stingrays by flipping them upside down. Marine wildlife photographer Brian Skerry has a close encounter with the mother orca, who offers him a stingray. In Patagonia, a grandmother passes on the difficult technique of catching sea lions by rushing up onto shore. An adopted orca struggles to learn this hunting strategy. Unique knowledge like this must be passed down from generation to generation, indicating whales have a sense of culture.
2	"Humpback Song"	Brian Armstrong & Andy Mitchell	Brian Armstrong & Andy Mitchell	April 22, 2021
Humpback whales travel vast distances from the poles to the equatorial ocean to give birth. Mothers and calves must make the long journey back to northern or southern waters. In the Southern Hemisphere, the whales pass along a specific mating song for thousands of miles. In the Northern Hemisphere, a group of whales return year after year to work together as they capture krill in bubble nets. A mother humpback teaches her calf this skill, which takes practice to master.
3	"Beluga Kingdom"	Brian Armstrong & Andy Mitchell	Brian Armstrong & Andy Mitchell	April 22, 2021
Around Greenland, over two-thousand beluga whales return to the same place each year where mothers give birth to their calves. They will teach their babies the hundreds of complex vocalizations belugas use to communicate. A polar bear poses a threat when two belugas are trapped in shallow waters and a calf is separated from his mother. Parent and offspring are eventually reunited, but the third whale falls pray to the hungry bear. Narwhals migrate from Baffin Bay to shallow, warmer western waters. One narwhal is separated from his family and becomes increasingly lost. Facing starvation, he encounters a pod of belugas (the narwhal's closest species) and joins the group to survive.
4	"Ocean Giants"	Brian Armstrong & Andy Mitchell	Brian Armstrong & Andy Mitchell	April 22, 2021
On an epic journey that spans the world's oceans in Dominica, the Azores and Sri Lanka, witness the complex culture of the gentle giants. Relying solely on the next generation's ability to learn their intricate ways, family culture and secrets, the sperm whales' future rests upon its youngest members.

== Release ==
Secrets of the Whales premiered on April 22, 2021, on Disney+ and National Geographic for Earth Day.

== Reception ==
=== Critical reception ===
On the review aggregator website Rotten Tomatoes, 92% of 12 critics' reviews are positive, with an average rating of 8.60/10. Metacritic, which uses a weighted average, assigned the film a score of 89 out of 100, based on 4 critics, indicating "universal acclaim".

Mike Hale of The New York Times found the visuals exciting, stating that the shots manage to provide a deep emotion for the audience, while claiming that the series emphasizes the intelligence and the social skills of whales. John Serba of Decider stated that the series succeeds to distinguish itself from other wildlife documentaries, claiming it provides fairly scientific data and very satisfying visuals that manage to capture the attention of the audience. Richard Roeper of Chicago Sun-Times gave the series a 4 out of 4 stars rating, claimed that the documentary succeeds to explore the behavior and culture of different whale species scientifically, found the visuals of the series astonishing across its photography, while saying that Sigourney Weaver was the ideal choice as the narrator. Joly Herman of Common Sense Media rated the series 4 out of 5 stars and acclaimed the education value, claiming that the documentary succeeds to portray the intelligence and culture of whales, praised the positive messages and role models, stating that Secrets of the Whales depicts the importance of love, teamwork, and creativity among the whales to the survival of their species, while complimenting Weaver's performance.

=== Accolades ===
Year	Award	Category	Nominee(s)	Result	Ref.
2021	Primetime Creative Arts Emmy Award	Outstanding Narrator	Sigourney Weaver (for "Ocean Giants")	Nominated	
2021	Primetime Creative Arts Emmy Award	Outstanding Documentary or Nonfiction Series	James Cameron, Maria Wilhelm, Shannon, Malone-Debenedictis, Pamela Caragol, Kevin Krug, Samuel LeGrys, Brian Skerry	Won	
2021	Primetime Creative Arts Emmy Award	Outstanding Cinematography for a Nonfiction Program	Hayes Baxley, Andy Mitchell, Brian Armstrong (for "Ocean Giants")	Nominated	
2021	Online Film & Television Association	Best Narration	Sigourney Weaver	Nominated	
2021	Online Film & Television Association	Best Cinematography in a Variety, Sketch, Nonfiction, or Reality Program	Secrets of the Whales	Nominated	
