= Paul Rudd =

American actor (born 1969)

- Rudd at the 2026 New York Film Festival
- Born: Paul Stephen Rudd; April 6, 1969 (age 57); Passaic, New Jersey, U.S.
- Education: University of Kansas; American Academy of Dramatic Arts
- Years active: 1991–present
- Works: Full list
- Spouse: Julie Yaeger (m. 2003)
- Children: 2
- Awards: Full list

Paul Stephen Rudd (born April 6, 1969) is an American actor. Rudd studied theatre at the University of Kansas and the American Academy of Dramatic Arts before making his acting debut in 1991. He was included on the Forbes Celebrity 100 list in 2019, and was named People magazine's "Sexiest Man Alive" in 2021. The accolades he has received include a Critics' Choice Television Award, alongside nominations for two Actor Awards, a Golden Globe Award, and two Primetime Emmy Awards.

Born to British parents in New Jersey, Rudd appeared in the films Clueless (1995), Halloween: The Curse of Michael Myers (1995), Romeo + Juliet (1996), Wet Hot American Summer (2001), Anchorman: The Legend of Ron Burgundy (2004), The 40-Year-Old Virgin (2005), Knocked Up (2007), I Love You, Man (2009), and This Is 40 (2012). He has played the superhero Scott Lang / Ant-Man in five Marvel Cinematic Universe (MCU) films, from Ant-Man (2015) to Ant-Man and the Wasp: Quantumania (2023). He played Gary Grooberson in the Ghostbusters films Afterlife (2021) and Frozen Empire (2024).

Rudd has also appeared in numerous television shows, including the sitcom Friends (2002–2004) as Mike Hannigan, and has featured as a guest host of Saturday Night Live multiple times. He had a dual role in the comedy series Living with Yourself (2019), which earned him a nomination for the Golden Globe Award for Best Actor in a Television Series – Musical or Comedy. He starred in the miniseries The Shrink Next Door (2021), and featured in the Hulu comedy series Only Murders in the Building (2023–2025), which earned him a nomination for the Primetime Emmy Award for Outstanding Supporting Actor in a Comedy Series.

== Early life and education ==
Paul Stephen Rudd was born on April 6, 1969, in Passaic, New Jersey, to English Jewish parents. His father, Michael Rudd (1943–2008), was an historical tour guide and worked for Trans World Airlines (TWA). His mother, Gloria Irene Granville, was a sales manager at the television station KSMO-TV in Kansas City, Missouri. His father was from Edgware and his mother from Surbiton, both in London. Both were descended from Ashkenazi Jewish immigrants who moved to England from Belarus, Poland, and Russia. His parents were second cousins. Rudd had a bar mitzvah service in Ontario, Canada. Growing up, he loved reading the Scottish comics The Beano and The Dandy, which his uncle sent him from the United Kingdom.

When Rudd was 10 years old, his family moved to Lenexa in Johnson County, Kansas. Because of his father's occupation, they also spent three years in Anaheim, California. In Kansas, Rudd attended Broadmoor Junior High and graduated from Shawnee Mission West High School in 1987. He placed fifth in Humorous Interpretation at the 1987 National Forensics League National Tournament. He attended the University of Kansas, where he majored in theater and belonged to the Sigma Nu fraternity's Nu chapter. He studied at the American Academy of Dramatic Arts with fellow actor Matthew Lillard. He also spent three months studying Jacobean drama at the British American Drama Academy in Oxford. While at acting school, he worked as a disc jockey (DJ) at bar mitzvahs. After graduation, he had a variety of odd jobs, including glazing hams at the Holiday Ham Company in Overland Park, Kansas.

== Career ==
=== Film and television ===
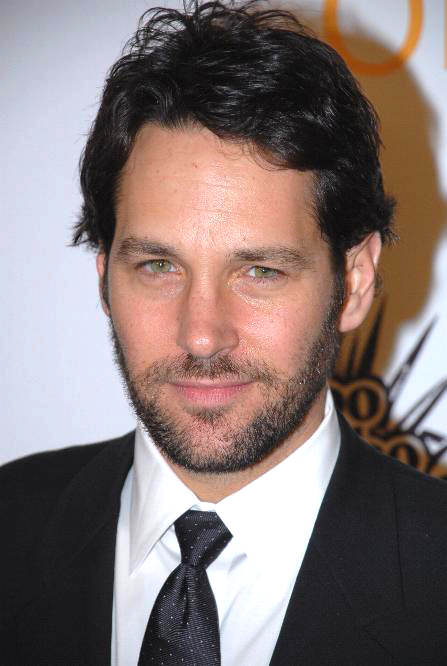
Rudd in December 2007

Rudd made his acting debut in 1991 when he starred in a commercial promoting the Super Nintendo Entertainment System (which he later referenced in a 2025 commercial for the Nintendo Switch 2). Starting in 1992, he had a recurring role on the television drama Sisters as Kirby Quimby Philby. In 1994, he appeared in Wild Oats for six episodes. In 1995, he left Sisters for one season to appear in the comedy film Clueless. Rudd followed Clueless with supporting roles in films such as Halloween: The Curse of Michael Myers as Tommy Doyle, William Shakespeare's Romeo + Juliet, The Locusts, Overnight Delivery, The Object of My Affection, and 200 Cigarettes. He was in the cast of the 1999 film The Cider House Rules that received a Screen Actors Guild nomination for Outstanding Performance by a Cast in a Motion Picture.

He played FBI Agent Ian Curtis in the 2000 Hong Kong action film Gen-Y Cops. In 2002, he was cast on the sitcom Friends as Mike Hannigan, who dates and marries Phoebe Buffay. In 2006, he appeared in several episodes of Reno 911! as Guy Gerricault (pronounced "jericho"), the coach of a lamaze class; then portrayed a drug lord in the film Reno 911!: Miami. He guest-starred as a has-been 1990s rock star, Desmond Fellows, on the television series Veronica Mars, in the 2007 episode "Debasement Tapes."

The year 2004 marked the start of Rudd's work with director/producer Judd Apatow, first on the film Anchorman: The Legend of Ron Burgundy with Steve Carell, produced by Apatow; and again in 2005 in The 40-Year-Old Virgin with Carell, directed by Apatow. He subsequently appeared in 2007's Knocked Up which was written, produced and directed by Apatow. He narrated the 2007 edition of the long-running sports documentary series Hard Knocks, which featured the Kansas City Chiefs, whom he continues to support. It was the only season not to feature the series' regular narrator, Liev Schreiber.

In 2006, Rudd served as a narrator for the television documentary film The Armenian Genocide, broadcast by PBS to spread awareness of the killing of one million Armenians during World War I.

Rudd appeared as John Lennon in the comedy film Walk Hard: The Dewey Cox Story in 2007 and as a drug-addled surf instructor in Forgetting Sarah Marshall in 2008, both of which Apatow produced. Rudd had uncredited cameos in Year One (2009) and Bridesmaids (2011). In 2012, he starred in and co-produced with Apatow Wanderlust. He starred in the Knocked Up spinoff This Is 40, directed and produced by Apatow, and reprised his role of Brian Fantana in Anchorman 2: The Legend Continues (2013).

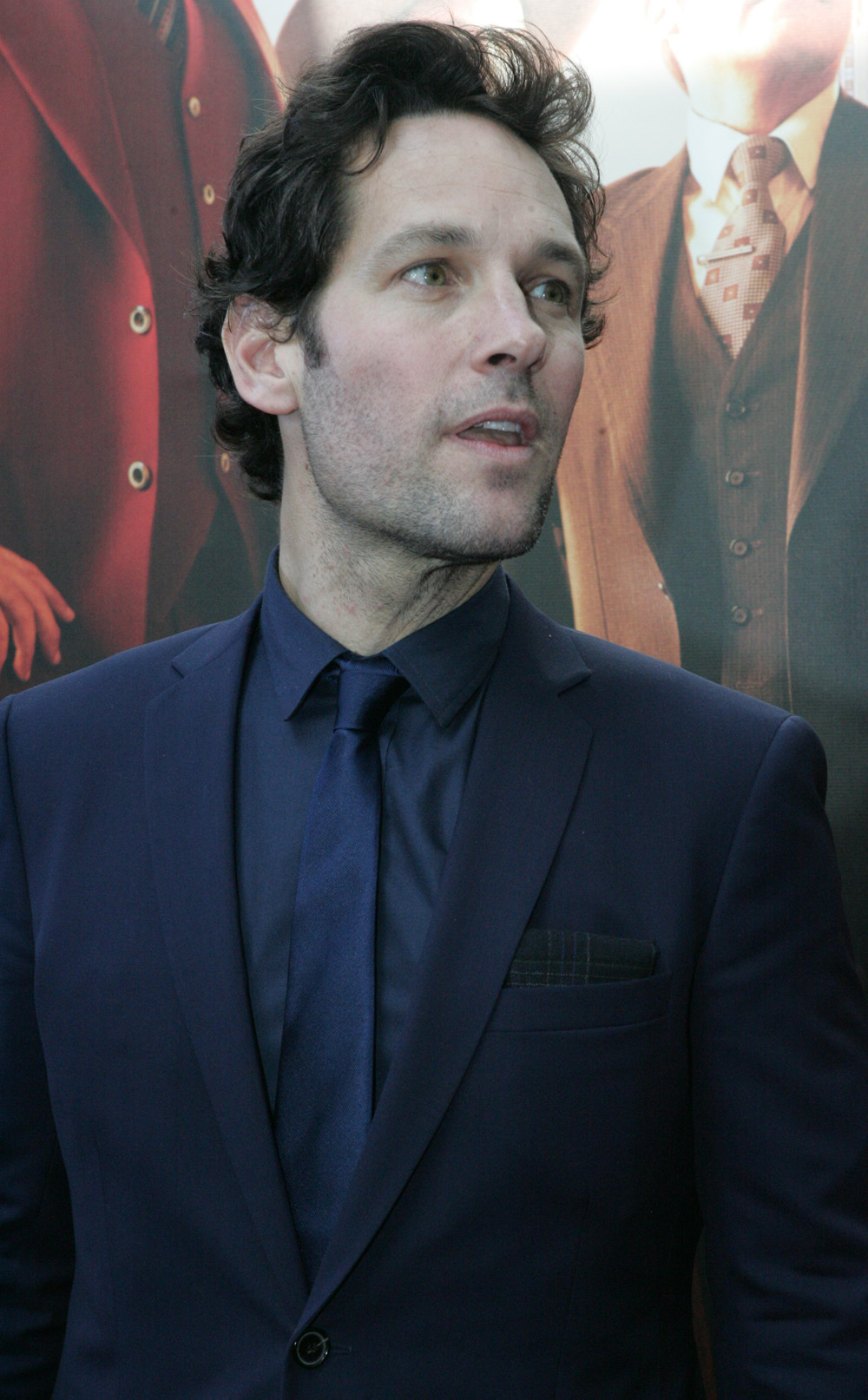
Rudd, 2013

In 2007, he starred in The Oh in Ohio and The Ten, which reunited him with David Wain and Michael Showalter, and then in Over Her Dead Body the next year. In his next comedy, which he also wrote, Role Models, he and co-star Seann William Scott portray energy drink salesmen forced to perform community service in a child mentoring program.

In 2009, Rudd again appeared with Jason Segel in I Love You, Man where he and Segel play buddies who bond over their shared love for the rock band Rush. Both Rudd and Segel are themselves fans of the band. Also in 2009, Rudd co-created the TV series Party Down with John Embom, Rob Thomas, and Dan Etheridge. He lent his voice to the DreamWorks animated movie Monsters vs. Aliens.

In 2010, Rudd reunited with Carell for the comedy Dinner for Schmucks. In 2012, he had a supporting role in the drama The Perks of Being a Wallflower. He starred in the 2011 comedy-drama film Our Idiot Brother. It was the fifth film that Rudd starred in with Elizabeth Banks. He had previously appeared with her in Wet Hot American Summer (2001), The Baxter (2005), The 40-Year-Old Virgin (2005), and Role Models (2008).

In 2012 and 2015, Rudd appeared in four episodes of NBC's Parks and Recreation as a rival of Amy Poehler's character Leslie Knope, a role for which he won the Critics' Choice Television Award for Best Guest Performer in a Comedy Series. In 2014, he began providing voiceovers for Hyundai television commercials. He also contributed narration to the audiobook recordings of John Hodgman's books The Areas of My Expertise (2005) and More Information Than You Require (2008).

On December 19, 2013, Rudd was officially confirmed as cast in the 2015 Marvel Cinematic Universe (MCU) film Ant-Man. He played lead character Scott Lang/Ant-Man. Rudd reprised his role in Captain America: Civil War (2016) as well as Ant-Man's 2018 sequel, Ant-Man and the Wasp; he also co-wrote the latter. Rudd returned alongside Evangeline Lilly in Avengers: Endgame (2019), which received critical acclaim and went on to become the highest-grossing film of all time. He reprised his role in 2023 with Ant-Man and the Wasp: Quantumania, and is set to appear in Avengers: Doomsday (2026).

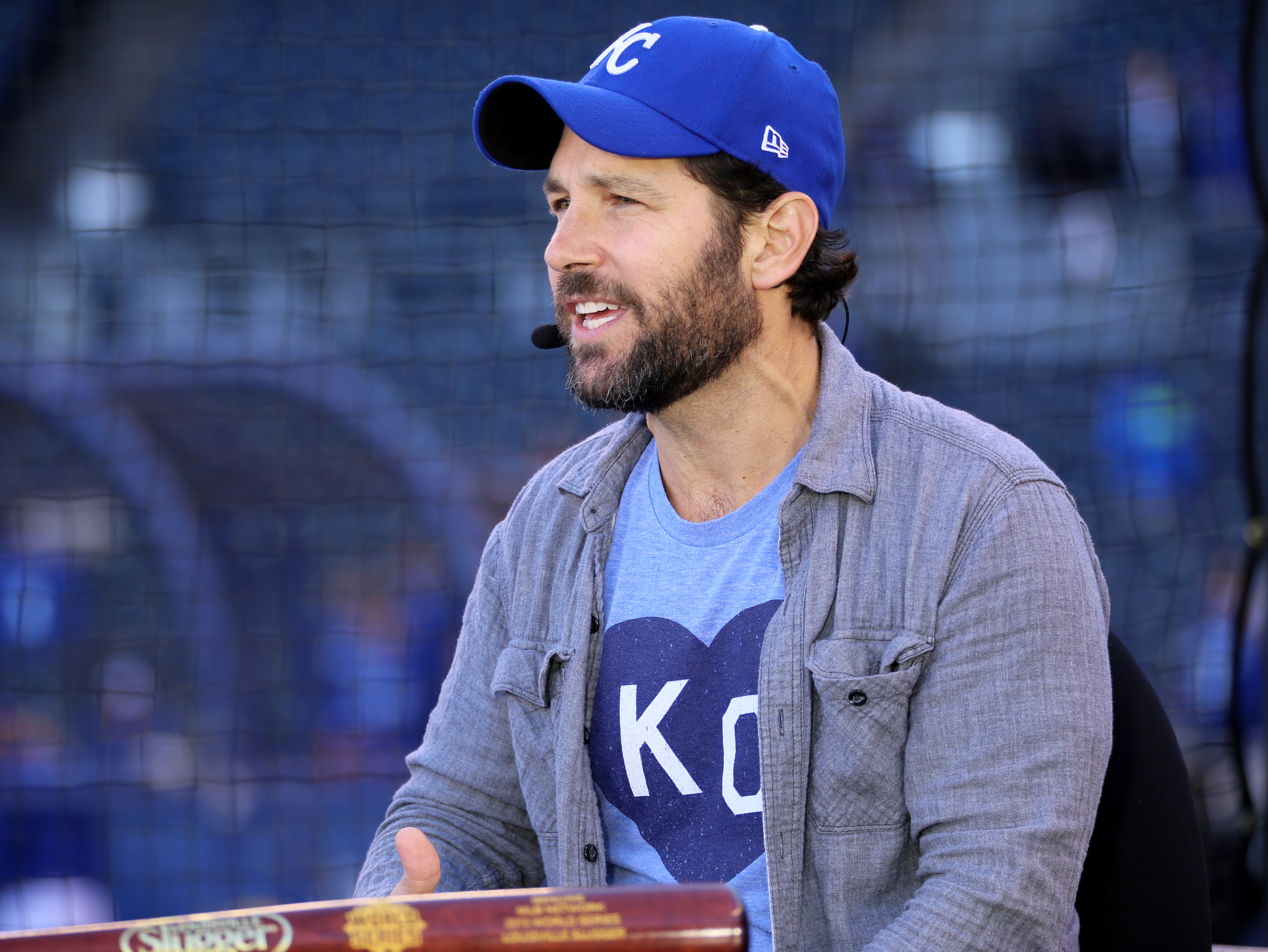
Rudd, 2015

In 2015, Rudd reprised his role as Andy from Wet Hot American Summer in the Netflix prequel Wet Hot American Summer: First Day of Camp, alongside an ensemble cast including Bradley Cooper, Amy Poehler, and Elizabeth Banks, all reprising their roles from the 2001 film. In 2016, he appeared in the comedy-drama film The Fundamentals of Caring, and lent his voice to the animated films The Little Prince and Sausage Party. He also lent his voice to a struggling actor named John in the animated comedy film Nerdland (2016). Rudd was also cast as the lead in The Catcher Was a Spy (2018), playing Moe Berg, a catcher for the Boston Red Sox who joined the Office of Strategic Services (OSS) during World War II. In 2019, Rudd starred in Netflix's comedy series Living with Yourself, which he executive produced. He also appeared in season 3 of Hulu's comedy mystery series Only Murders in the Building.

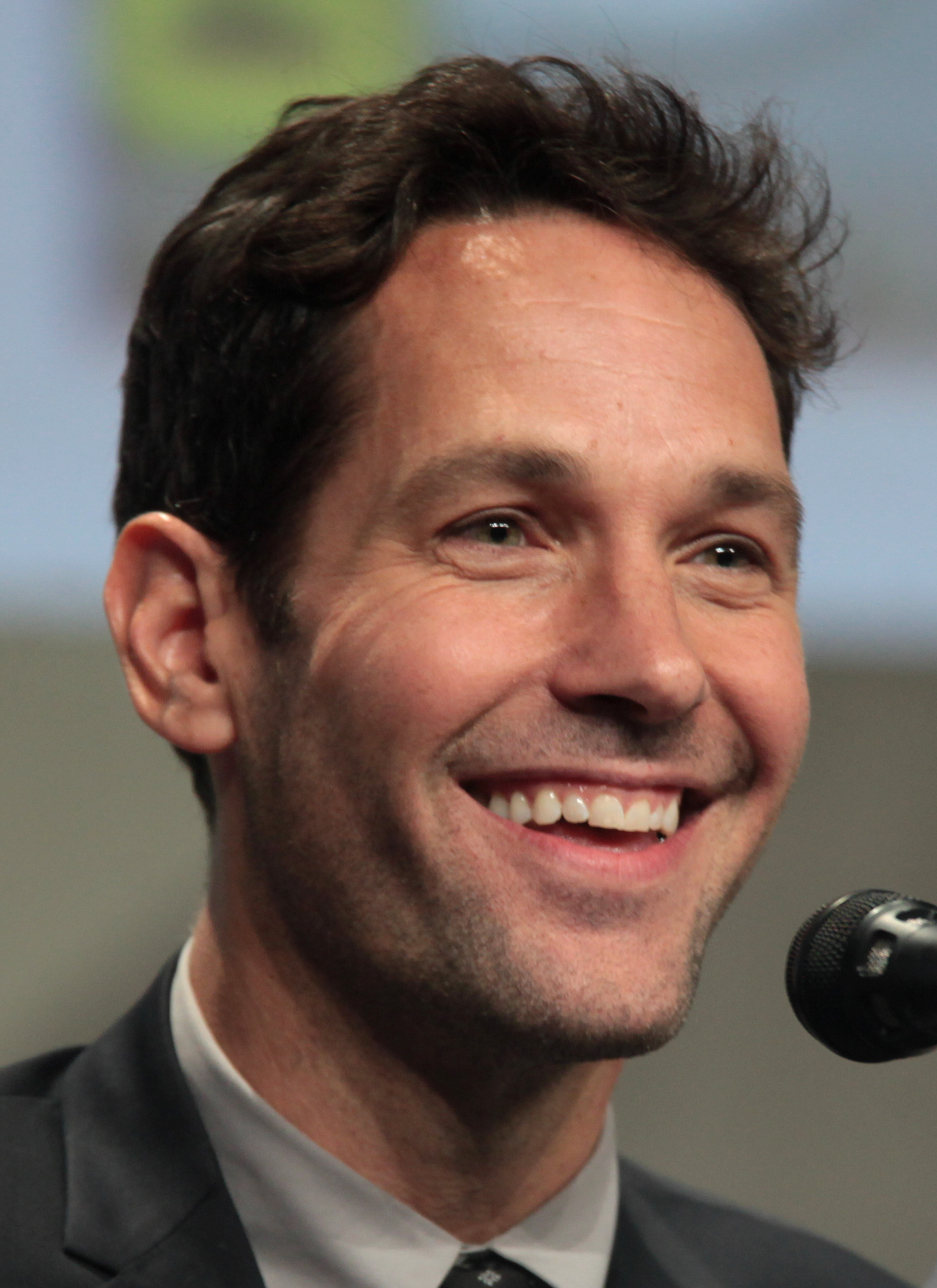
Rudd, 2016

From 2004 until 2021, during all appearances on the late night comedy shows hosted by comedian Conan O'Brien, when promoting his projects Rudd would explain the clip that is about to be shown, but would instead show a clip from the 1988 movie Mac and Me. Rudd admitted that he "never imagined" that the running gag would last so long: "There's something so tricky about it. Cause here I am. I'm gonna sell my wares on TV. Like, 'Here's something from what I just filmed.' It just seemed—and still does to a large extent—kind of insincere." Rudd continued the tradition with an audio version of the prank in a 2022 episode "Paul Rudd Returns" on the podcast Conan O'Brien Needs a Friend.

In 2024, Rudd received two nominations at the 76th Primetime Emmy Awards; for his role as a murder victim in the mystery series Only Murders in the Building he was one of the nominees for Outstanding Supporting Actor in a Comedy Series, while his narration in the National Geographic documentary series Secrets of the Octopus earned him a nomination for Outstanding Narrator.

=== Theatre ===
In 1997, Rudd performed in the Broadway play The Last Night of Ballyhoo. The next year he appeared in Twelfth Night at the Lincoln Center Theatre. In 2006, he appeared in the Broadway production of Three Days of Rain at the Bernard Jacobs Theater. In 2012, Rudd appeared in the Broadway production of Craig Wright's Grace at the Cort Theatre, with Academy Award nominee Michael Shannon and seven-time Emmy Award winner Ed Asner.

In 2000–2001, Rudd was in a production of Long Day's Journey Into Night at the Lyric Theatre, London. In 2001, he starred as Adam in the original London production of The Shape of Things, and again Off-Broadway for three months starting in October 2001. Two years later, a film version was made with the same cast.

== Personal life ==
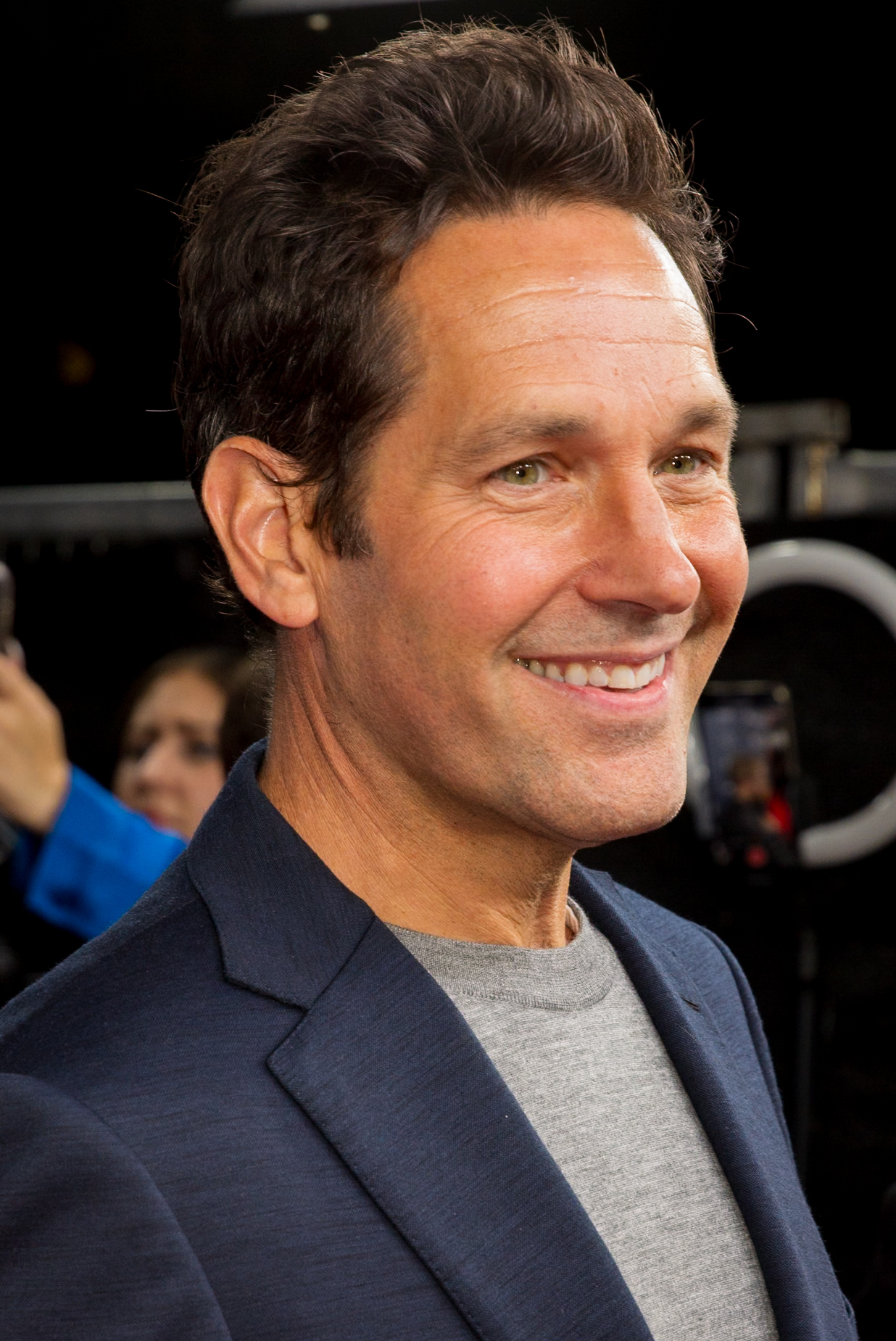
Rudd in 2024

In 2003, Rudd married Julie Yaeger, whom he met in his publicist's office, where she worked. She has since become a screenwriter and producer. They live in Rhinebeck, New York, with their two children: a son born in 2006 and a daughter born in 2010.

Rudd is a fan of Major League Baseball's Kansas City Royals, the National Football League's Kansas City Chiefs, for whom he narrated the 2007 season of HBO's Hard Knocks, and the University of Kansas' sports teams, the Jayhawks. Rudd has also narrated the Chiefs' annual Super Bowl recap episodes of America's Game: The Super Bowl Champions in 2020, 2023, and 2024.

Rudd received a star on the Hollywood Walk of Fame on July 1, 2015, unveiling the 2,554th star on Hollywood Boulevard. He said, "I remember being a kid and walking this boulevard and reading the names and thinking about what so many other millions of people thought about, which is, you know, 'Who's that?'"

Since 2014, Rudd and fellow actors Jeffrey Dean Morgan and Hilarie Burton have been co-owners of Samuel's Sweet Shop, a candy store in Rhinebeck, New York, that they saved from closing when the previous owner, a friend of theirs, died unexpectedly.

Rudd's seemingly ageless appearance has been subject to numerous jokes and memes; it was referenced in Deadpool & Wolverine (2024) where Deadpool and Wolverine stumble upon Giant-Man's corpse, prompting the former to say "Paul Rudd finally aged!" Responding to the jokes, Rudd has explained that eight hours of sleep, along with cardio, exercise with weights, and healthy meals, make it possible for him to age well.

Rudd is Jewish, although he has added that he is not "particularly religious". While promoting the film Ghostbusters: Frozen Empire, the actor said that if he could talk with anyone throughout history, he would want to speak with Jesus.

=== Philanthropy and advocacy ===
Rudd is a supporter of the Stuttering Association for the Young (SAY), a nonprofit organization dedicated to helping young people who stutter. He hosted its 6th Annual All-Star Bowling Benefit in January 2018. He told Vanity Fair that he became an advocate for stuttering awareness after portraying a character who stuttered in a play. Also, he is a founder of The Big Slick, a celebrity charity sports event held in Kansas City each June that supports Kansas City's Children's Mercy Hospital.

Rudd was part of Seth Rogen's Hilarity for Charity, to increase awareness and investment in Alzheimer's research.

Rudd was a signatory of "No Hostage Left Behind," a 2023 open letter espousing support for Israel in the Gaza war and asking US President Joe Biden to ensure the release of hostages kidnapped during the October 7 attacks.

== Discography ==
=== Soundtrack albums ===
List of soundtrack albums
Title	Album details
Power Ballad (with Nick Jonas)	Released: May 31, 2026; Labels: Republic Records; Format: Digital download, streaming
