= Primetime Emmy Award for Outstanding Narrator =

Category since 2014

- Awarded for: Outstanding Narrator
- Country: United States
- Presented by: Academy of Television Arts and Sciences
- Currently held by: Octavia Spencer, Lost Women of Atlanta (2026)
- Website: emmys.com

The Primetime Emmy Award for Outstanding Narrator is awarded to one individual each year.

In 2014, the Primetime Emmy Award for Outstanding Voice-Over Performance was separated into two categories – Outstanding Narrator and Outstanding Character Voice-Over Performance. Rules hold that the "submission must be performed/read as a traditional narration and may not be audio lifted from an on-camera performance or interview. If the narration is performed in the first person as a character rather than the narrator, even if credited as narrator, it should be submitted in the character voice-over category."

In the following list, the first titles listed in gold are the winners; those not in gold are nominees, which are listed in alphabetical order. The years given are those in which the ceremonies took place:

== Winners and nominations ==
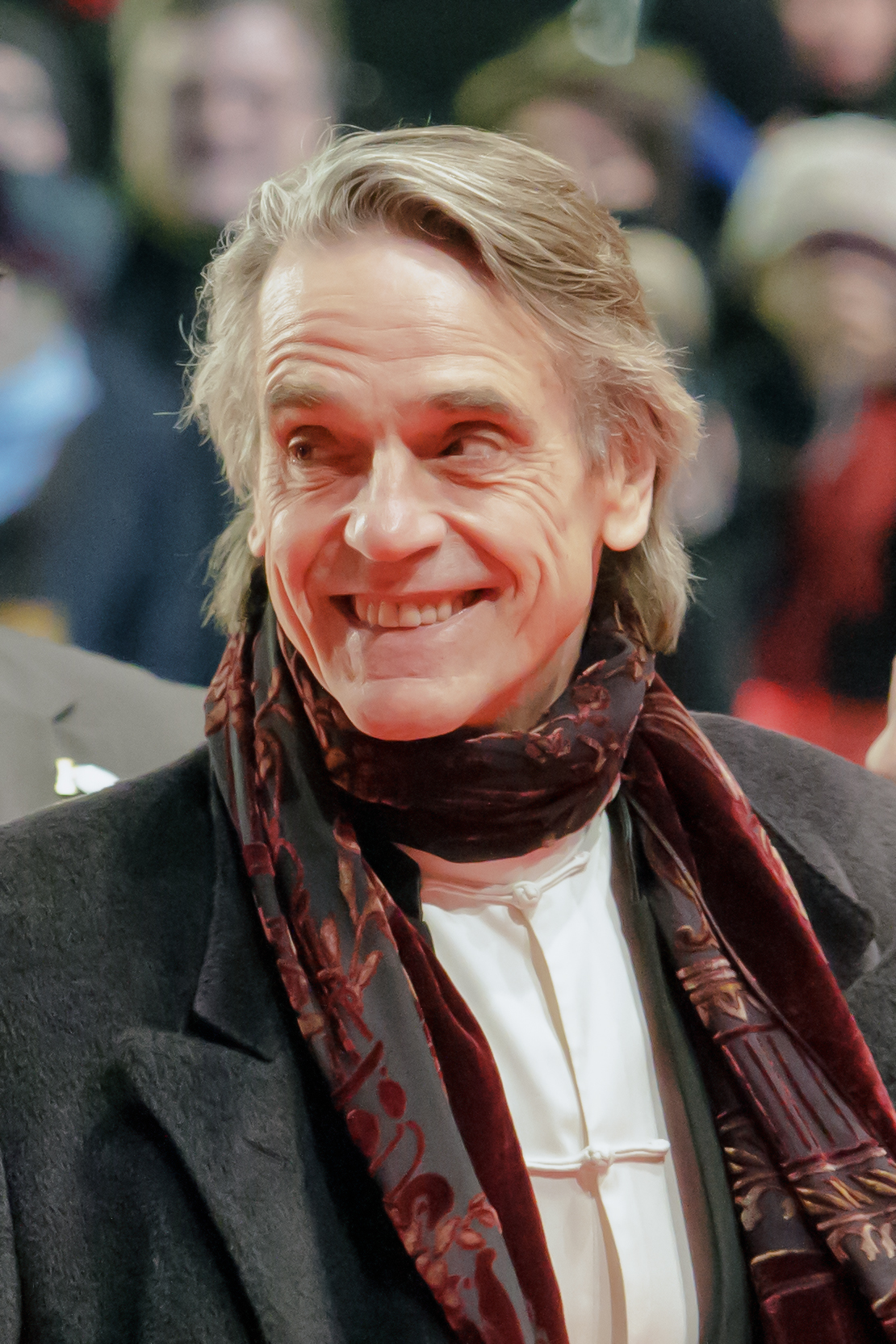
Jeremy Irons was the inaugural winner of this category in 2014.

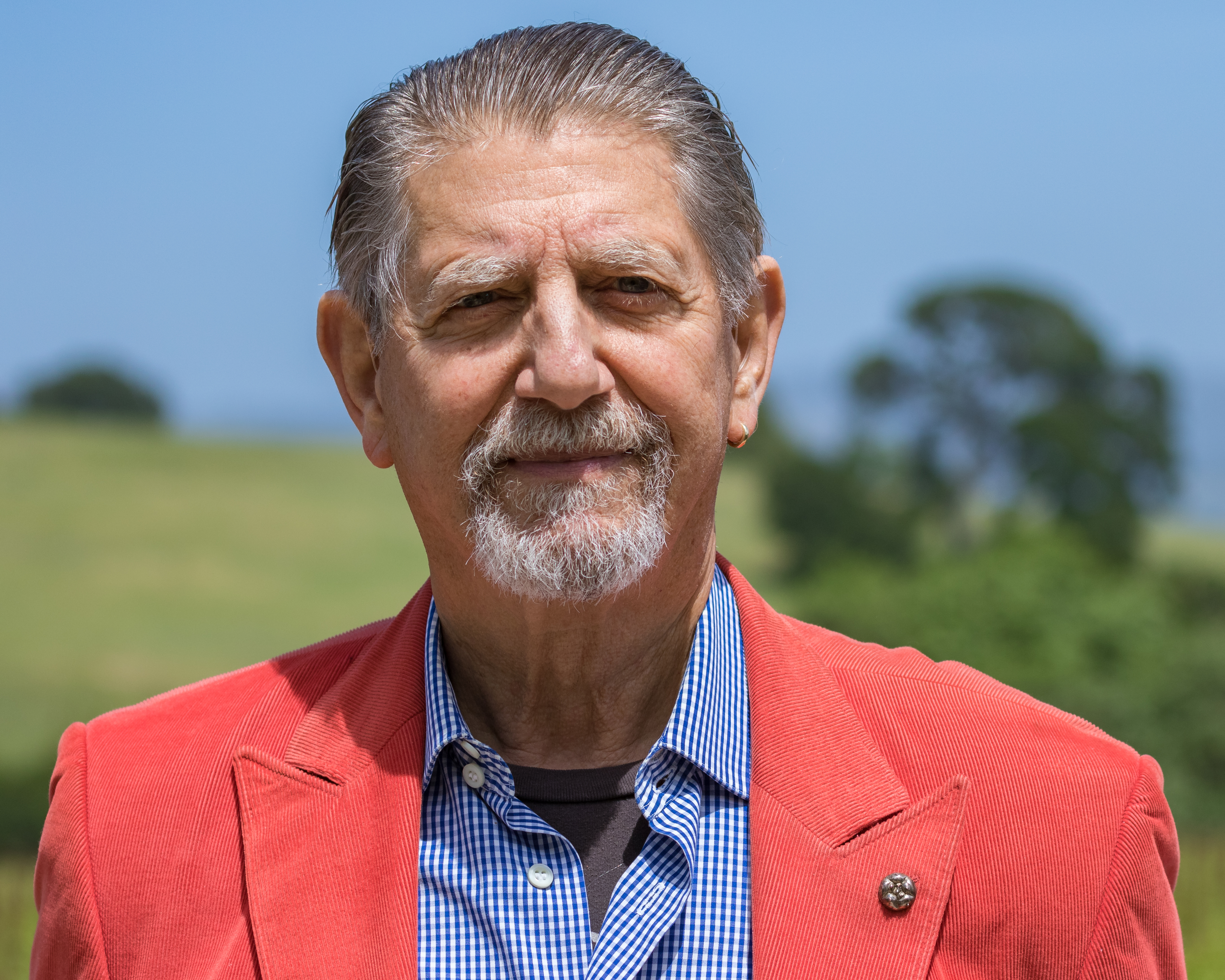
Peter Coyote won in 2015.

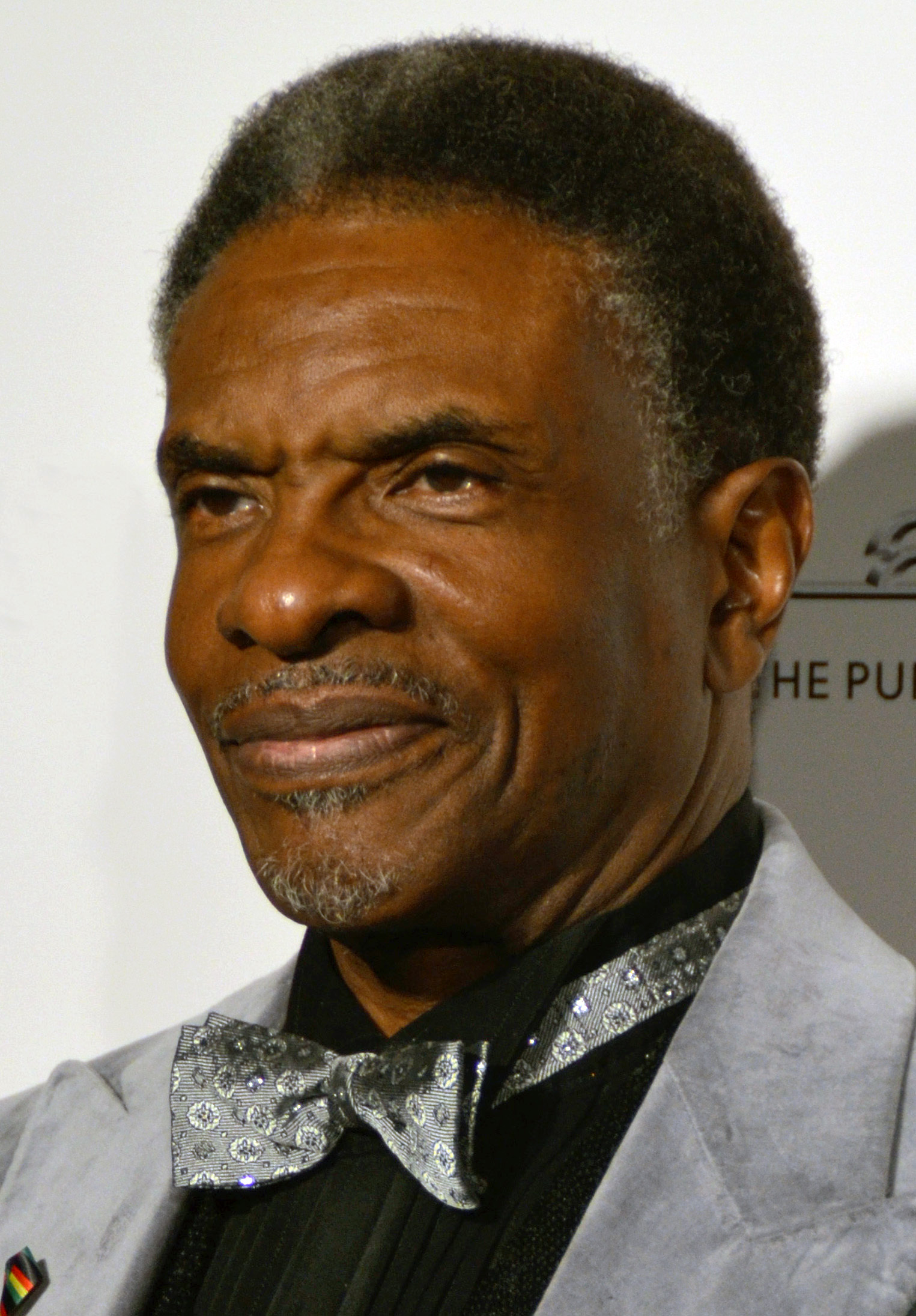
Keith David won in 2016.

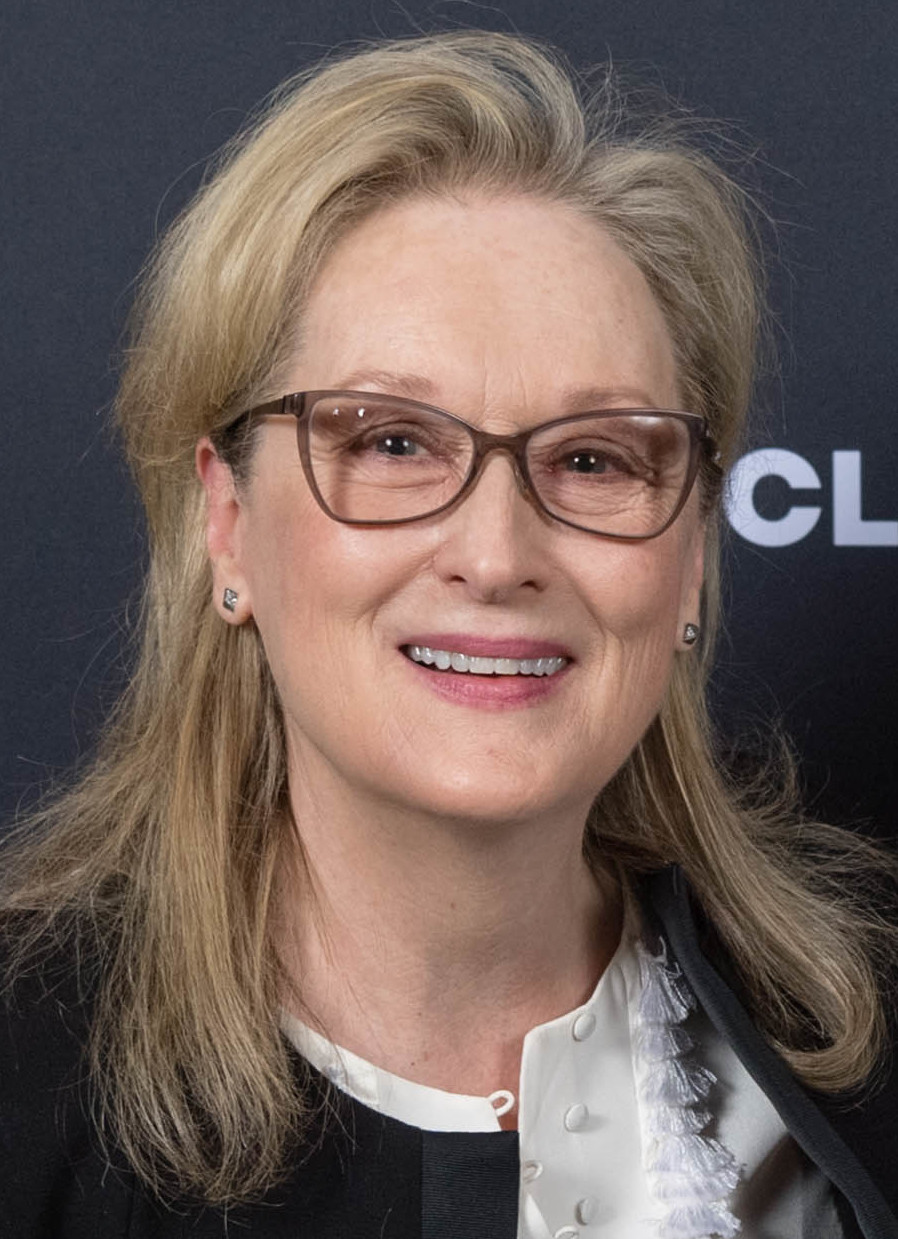
Meryl Streep won for 2017.

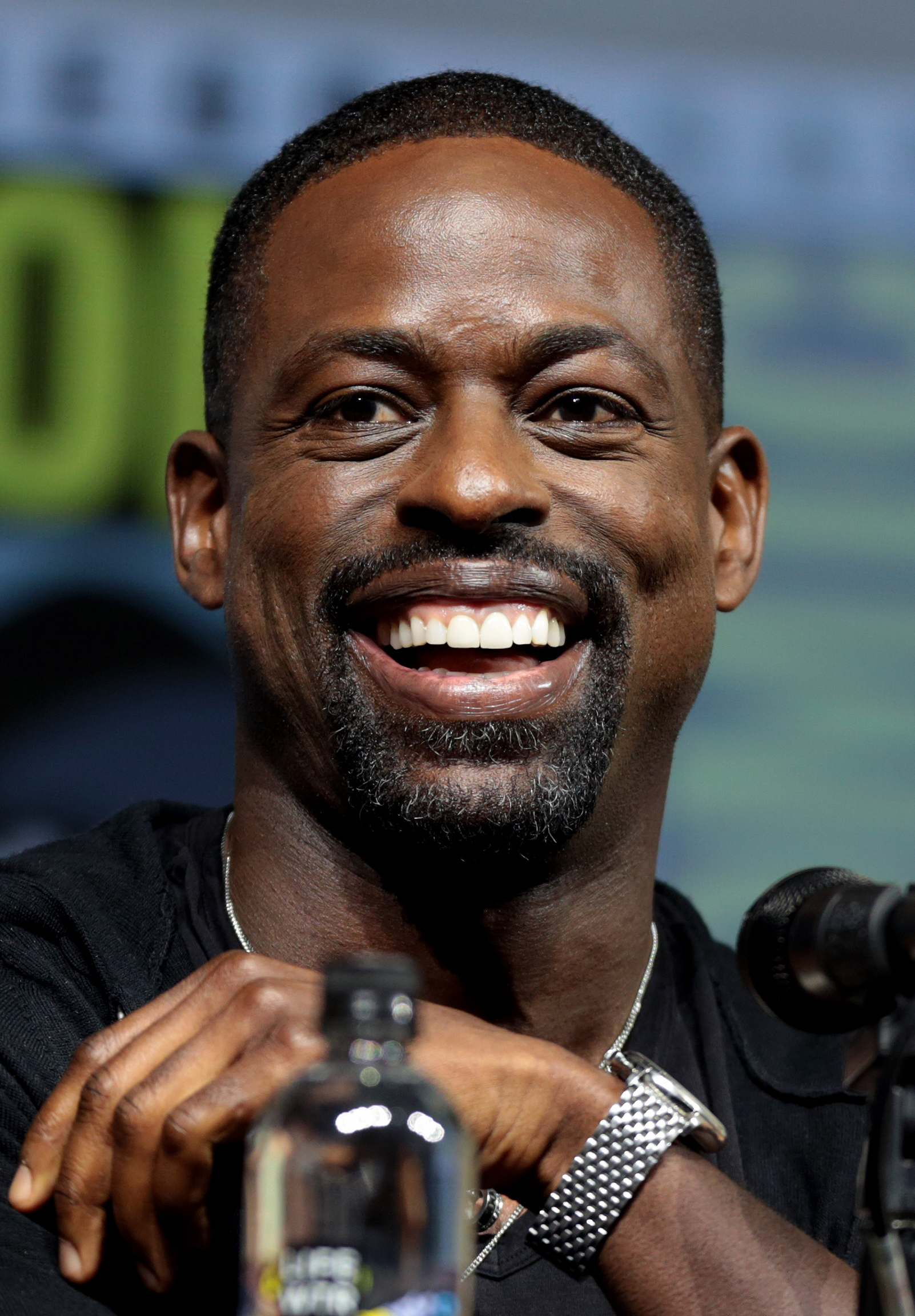
Sterling K. Brown won in 2021.

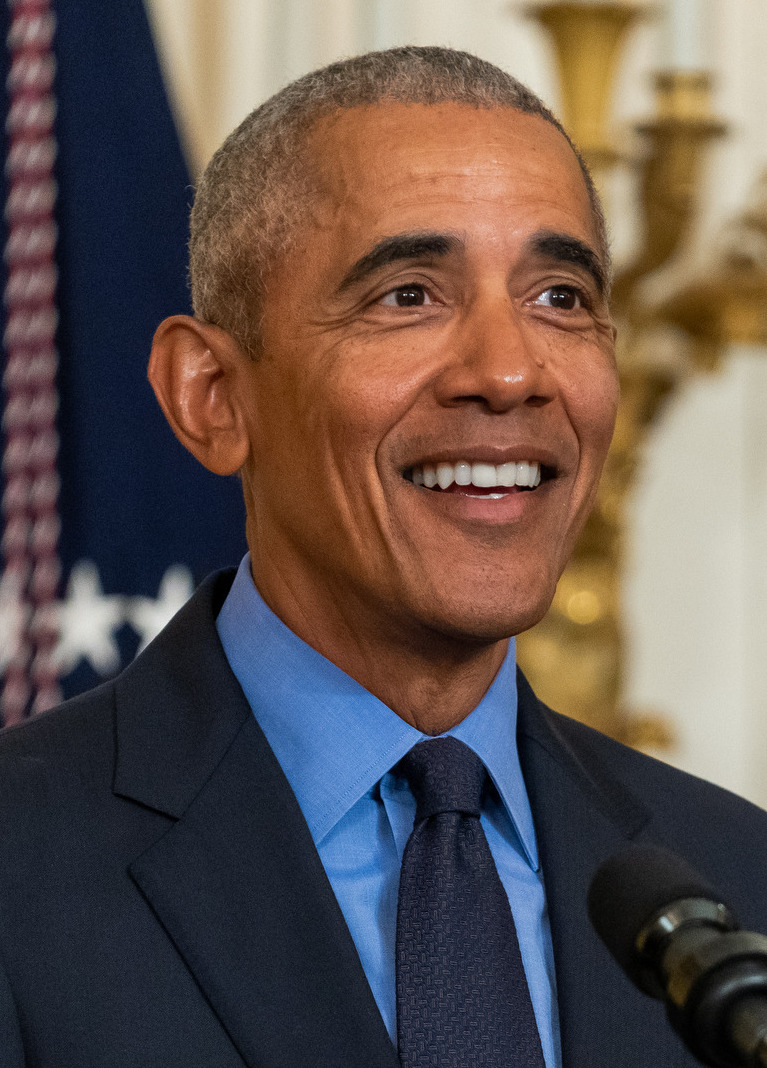
Former President of the United States Barack Obama won twice consecutively in 2022 and 2023.

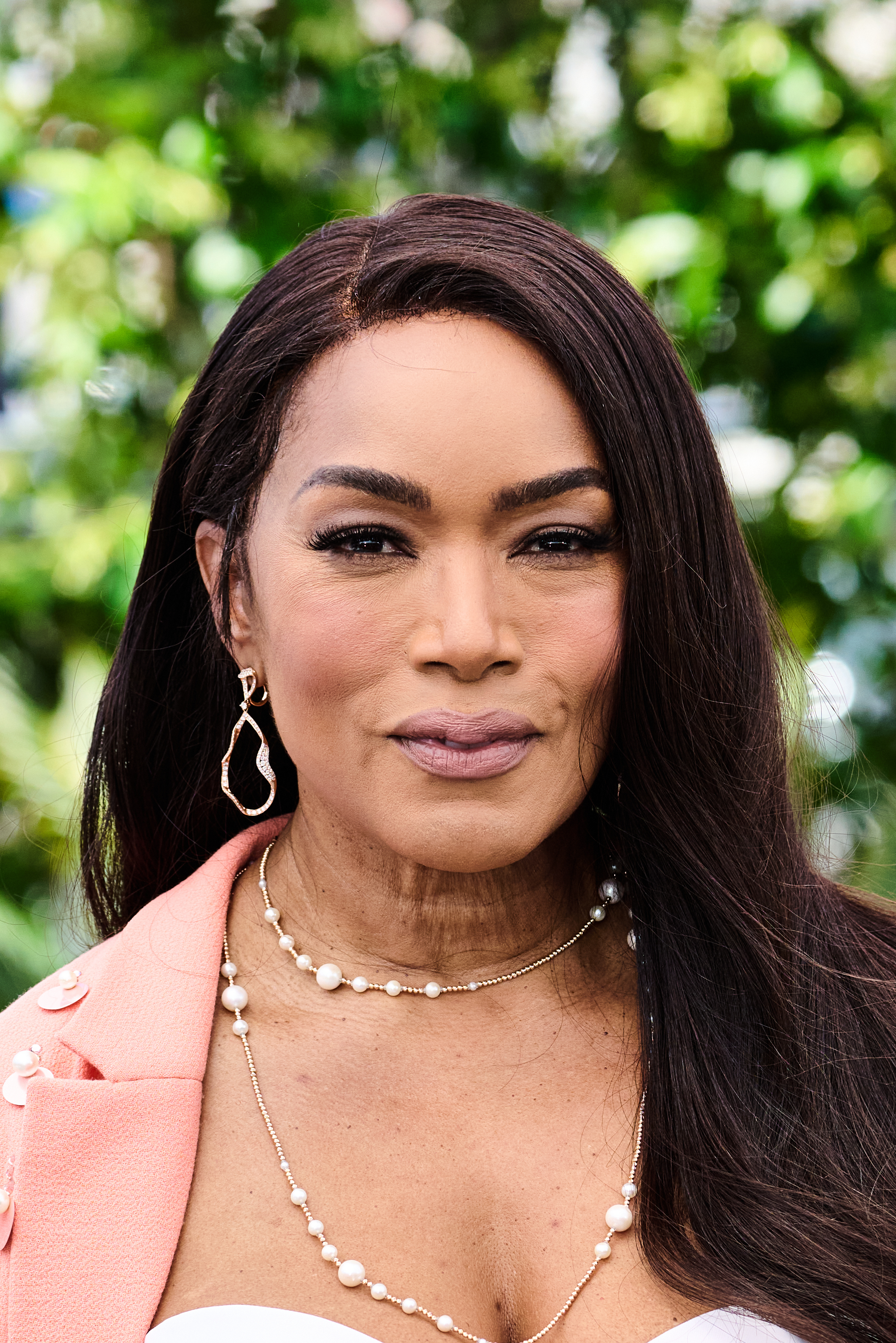
Angela Bassett won in 2024.

=== 1990s ===
Year	Narrator	Program	Network
1994 (46th)
1994 (46th)	Outstanding Individual Achievement - Informational Programming (Note: This program was nominated as Outstanding Individual Achievement - Informational Programming. As a juried award, nominees had to garner 50% approval to win the award.) (Note: In 2020, the TV Academy rescinded a win in this category for the Disney Channel special George Stevens: D-Day to Berlin, narrated by George Stevens Jr. The program was a re-edit of the 1985 BBC documentary D-Day to Berlin, in violation of a rule that "a program that is a foreign acquisition without benefit of a domestic co-production cannot be re-introduced into eligibility in a current awards year, even though it may have been modified with new footage, sound track, musical score, etc.")		
1994 (46th)	David Marshall Grant	The Legend of Billy the Kid	Disney

=== 2010s ===
Year	Narrator	Program	Episode submission	Network
2014 (66th)
2014 (66th)	Jeremy Irons	Game of Lions		Nat Geo
2014 (66th)	Daniel Craig	One Life		Nat Geo
2014 (66th)	Whoopi Goldberg	Whoopi Goldberg Presents Moms Mabley		HBO
2014 (66th)	Jane Lynch	Penguins: Waddle All the Way		Discovery
2014 (66th)	Henry Strozier	Too Cute!	"Holiday Special"	Animal Planet
2015 (67th)
2015 (67th)	Peter Coyote	The Roosevelts: An Intimate History	"Episode 1: Get Action 1858–1901"	PBS
2015 (67th)	Anthony Mendez	Jane the Virgin	"Chapter Fourteen"	The CW
2015 (67th)	Miranda Richardson	Operation Orangutan		Nat Geo
2015 (67th)	Henry Strozier	Too Cute!	"Tubby Puppies"	Animal Planet
2015 (67th)	Neil deGrasse Tyson	Hubble's Cosmic Journey		Nat Geo
2016 (68th)
2016 (68th)	Keith David	Jackie Robinson		PBS
2016 (68th)	David Attenborough	Life Story	"First Steps"	Discovery
2016 (68th)	Adrien Brody	Breakthrough	"Decoding the Brain"	Nat Geo
2016 (68th)	Laurence Fishburne	Roots		History
2016 (68th)	Anthony Mendez	Jane the Virgin	"Chapter Thirty-Four"	The CW
2017 (69th)
2017 (69th)	Meryl Streep	Five Came Back	"The Price of Victory"	Netflix
2017 (69th)	Laurence Fishburne	Year Million	"Homo Sapien 2.0"	Nat Geo
2017 (69th)	Ewan McGregor	Wild Scotland		Nat Geo
2017 (69th)	Sam Neill	Wild New Zealand		Nat Geo
2017 (69th)	Liev Schreiber	Muhammad Ali: Only One		HBO
2017 (69th)	Liev Schreiber	UConn: The March to Madness		HBO
2018 (70th)
2018 (70th)	David Attenborough	Blue Planet II	"One Ocean"	BBC America
2018 (70th)	Charles Dance	Savage Kingdom	"Uprising: First Blood"	Nat Geo
2018 (70th)	Morgan Freeman	March of the Penguins 2: The Next Step		Hulu
2018 (70th)	Carl Reiner	If You're Not in the Obit, Eat Breakfast		HBO
2018 (70th)	Liev Schreiber	24/7	"Canelo-Golovkin"	HBO
2019 (71st)
2019 (71st)	David Attenborough	Our Planet	"One Planet"	Netflix
2019 (71st)	Angela Bassett	The Flood	"First Pulse"	Nat Geo
2019 (71st)	Charles Dance	Savage Kingdom	"Fall of the Queen"	Nat Geo
2019 (71st)	Anthony Mendez	Wonders of Mexico		PBS
2019 (71st)	Liev Schreiber	The Many Lives of Nick Buoniconti		HBO
2019 (71st)	Juliet Stevenson	Queens of Mystery	"Murder in the Dark: First Chapter"	Acorn TV

=== 2020s ===
Year	Narrator	Program	Episode submission	Network
2020 (72nd)
2020 (72nd)	David Attenborough	Seven Worlds, One Planet	"Antarctica"	BBC America
2020 (72nd)	Kareem Abdul-Jabbar	Black Patriots: Heroes of the Revolution		History
2020 (72nd)	Angela Bassett	The Imagineering Story	"The Happiest Place on Earth"	Disney+
2020 (72nd)	Chiwetel Ejiofor	The Elephant Queen		Apple TV+
2020 (72nd)	Lupita Nyong'o	Serengeti	"Destiny"	Discovery
2021 (73rd)
2021 (73rd)	Sterling K. Brown	Lincoln: Divided We Stand	"The Dogs of War"	CNN
2021 (73rd)	David Attenborough	A Perfect Planet	"Volcano"	Discovery+
2021 (73rd)	David Attenborough	The Year Earth Changed		Apple TV+
2021 (73rd)	Anthony Hopkins	Mythic Quest	"Everlight"	Apple TV+
2021 (73rd)	Sigourney Weaver	Secrets of the Whales	"Ocean Giants"	Disney+
2022 (74th)
2022 (74th)	Barack Obama	Our Great National Parks	"A World of Wonder"	Netflix
2022 (74th)	Kareem Abdul-Jabbar	Black Patriots: Heroes of the Civil War		History
2022 (74th)	David Attenborough	The Mating Game	"In Plain Sight"	Discovery+
2022 (74th)	W. Kamau Bell	We Need to Talk About Cosby	"Part 1"	Showtime
2022 (74th)	Lupita Nyong'o	Serengeti II	"Intrigue"	Discovery+
2023 (75th)
2023 (75th)	Barack Obama	Working: What We Do All Day	"The Middle"	Netflix
2023 (75th)	Mahershala Ali	Chimp Empire	"Reckoning"	Netflix
2023 (75th)	Angela Bassett	Good Night Oppy		Prime Video
2023 (75th)	Morgan Freeman	Our Universe	"Chasing Starlight"	Netflix
2023 (75th)	Pedro Pascal	Patagonia: Life on the Edge of the World	"Mountains"	CNN
2024 (76th)
2024 (76th)	Angela Bassett	Queens	"African Queens"	Nat Geo
2024 (76th)	David Attenborough	Planet Earth III	"Human"	BBC America
2024 (76th)	Morgan Freeman	Life on Our Planet	"Chapter 1: The Rules of Life"	Netflix
2024 (76th)	Paul Rudd	Secrets of the Octopus	"Masterminds"	Nat Geo
2024 (76th)	Octavia Spencer	Lost Women of Highway 20	"Vanished"	ID
2025 (77th)
2025 (77th)	Barack Obama	Our Oceans	"Indian Ocean"	Netflix
2025 (77th)	David Attenborough	Planet Earth: Asia	"The Frozen North"	BBC America
2025 (77th)	Idris Elba	Erased: WW2's Heroes of Color	"D-Day"	Nat Geo
2025 (77th)	Tom Hanks	The Americas	"The Andes"	NBC
2025 (77th)	Phoebe Waller-Bridge	Octopus!	"Part 1"	Prime Video
2026 (78th)
2026 (78th)	Octavia Spencer	Lost Women of Alaska	"The Missing"	ID
2026 (78th)	David Attenborough	A Gorilla Story: Told by David Attenborough		Netflix
2026 (78th)	David Attenborough	Ocean with David Attenborough		Nat Geo
2026 (78th)	Jodie Foster	Breakdown: 1975		Netflix
2026 (78th)	Werner Herzog	Ghost Elephants		Nat Geo

== Performers with multiple wins ==
Total include wins for Outstanding Voice-Over Performance.

3 wins

- David Attenborough (consecutive)
- Keith David
- Barack Obama (2 consecutive)

2 wins

- Jeremy Irons

== Performers with multiple nominations ==
Total include nominations for Outstanding Voice-Over Performance.

11 nominations

- David Attenborough

4 nominations

- Angela Bassett
- Liev Schreiber

3 nominations

- Keith David
- Morgan Freeman
- Anthony Mendez
- Barack Obama

2 nominations

- Kareem Abdul-Jabbar
- Charles Dance
- Laurence Fishburne
- Jeremy Irons
- Lupita Nyong'o
- Octavia Spencer
- Henry Strozier
