= Sloth Sanctuary of Costa Rica =

- Interactive map of Sloth Sanctuary of Costa Rica
- 9.799565°N 82.915112°W
- Date opened: 1997
- Location: Limón Province, Costa Rica
- Website: slothsanctuary.com

The Sloth Sanctuary of Costa Rica (Spanish: Santuario de Perezosos de Costa Rica) is a privately owned animal rescue center located near the city of Cahuita. The Sanctuary is dedicated to the rescue, rehabilitation, research, and release of injured or orphaned sloths. Tours of the Sanctuary are offered to the public.

== History ==
After the 1991 Limon earthquake ended their birding tourism business, Judy Avey-Arroyo and her husband Luis Arroyo built a hotel on their property. In 1992, three girls brought the Arroyos an orphaned baby three-toed sloth. At the time, very little was known about sloth biology. By observing what the wild sloths on their property ate, the couple were able to hand-rear the sloth, named Buttercup, who lived in the Sanctuary until her death in 2019. In 1997, the Sanctuary was officially recognized as a rescue center, becoming Costa Rica's first sloth-only facility.

The lives of the Sanctuary's sloth residents were documented in the 2013 Animal Planet television series, Meet the Sloths. In 2016, two former employees accused the Sanctuary of animal mistreatment, which Avey-Arroyo denied.
