= Too Cute (TV series) =

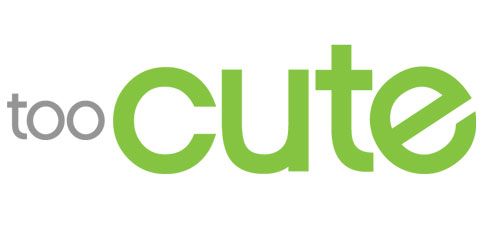
- Also known as: Too Cute OMG
- Narrated by: Henry Strozier
- Country of origin: United States
- Original language: English
- No. of seasons: 6
- No. of episodes: 73 (list of episodes)

Production
- Production location: Various
- Running time: 20–43 minutes

Original release
- Network: Animal Planet
- Release: April 30, 2011 – January 2, 2017

Too Cute (stylized as too cute) is an American television series that aired on Animal Planet from April 30, 2011 to January 2, 2017. Once a series of four separate specials in 2011, Too Cute became a series a year later with seven episodes in its second season. Reruns of this show aired on Discovery Family.

== Synopsis ==
Each episode tells a "coming of age" story as narrated by theater veteran Henry Strozier (born 1943; who, for this show, was twice nominated for an Primetime Emmy Award for Outstanding Narrator), and features three different groups of animals, mostly cats and dogs, in the first eight to 12 weeks of their lives. The events of this time period of an animal's life are observed and presented from the first tentative steps that help them get started investigating the new world around them, to the days of playful contact with new creatures and familiar faces.

The beginning of the show starts with it gently spoofing the "viewer discretion advised" warning: "The following program contains material that is just too cute. Viewer discretion is advised."

Before the show cuts to a commercial break (4/5), the viewer is presented with a preview of coming events as well as a "Too Cute Quiz," a question concerning animal breeds. Once the show returns from the break, the correct answer is given along with an explanation or comment about it, before resuming the episode. After the last commercial break, the scene shows every pet going to their forever home, during which also recaps from the animal's birth to now. At the end of each episode, an epilogue is shown of the pets that stand out from each litter or animal group, and where are they today.

It was announced that Too Cute returned for a third season with new episodes that aired on August 3, 2013. Also, Animal Planet partnered up with the Washington Animal Rescue League to launch the "Too Cute Kitten Cam" for online viewing.

== Episodes ==
Season	Episodes	Originally released	
Season	Episodes	First released	Last released
1	4	April 30, 2011	December 18, 2011
2	6	February 25, 2012	April 7, 2012
3	16	October 13, 2012	March 30, 2013
4	28	August 3, 2013	June 21, 2014
5	14	August 16, 2014	December 27, 2014
6	4	December 15, 2016	January 2, 2017

== See also ==
- Pick of the Litter - 2018 documentary film similar in content
- Puppy Bowl
- Coming of age story
