= Secrets of the Octopus =

- Genre: Nature documentary
- Created by: Adam Geiger; Alex Schnell
- Written by: Patrick Makin
- Directed by: Adam Geiger
- Presented by: Alex Schnell
- Narrated by: Paul Rudd
- Composer: Raphael May
- Original language: English
- No. of seasons: 1
- No. of episodes: 3

Production
- Executive producers: Colette Beaudry; James Cameron; Adam Geiger; Maria Wilhelm
- Producer: Sarah Beard
- Cinematography: Adam Geiger; Rory McGuinness; Maxwel Hohn; Jason Sturgis
- Production companies: SeaLight Pictures; Wildstar Films; Earthship Productions; National Geographic Studios

Original release
- Network: National Geographic Channel; Disney+; Hulu

Secrets of the Octopus is a nature documentary television series that depicts a variety of octopus species in a variety of habitats. The first episode aired April 21, 2024, on National Geographic, with all three episodes being released the following day on Disney+ and Hulu to celebrate Earth Day. Executive produced by James Cameron, it is the third series in his Secrets of franchise, preceded by Secrets of the Whales, and Secrets of the Elephants.

The octopuses were filmed in their natural habitat over 200 days by the production team.

== Premise ==
Secrets of the Octopus explores the life, culture, and behavior of different octopus species across the globe. Featuring narration by actor Paul Rudd, and commentary and discussion by a number of marine biologists, scientists, and experts in the field, the documentary series seeks to bring viewers closer than ever to one of the planet's most elusive and alien creatures.

=== Featured octopuses ===
Featured octopuses
Name	Image
Day octopus	
Blue-ringed octopus	
Giant Pacific octopus	
Veined octopus	

== Episodes ==
No.	Title	Directed by	Written by	Original release date
1	"Shapeshifters"	Adam Geiger	Patrick Makin	April 21, 2024
Whether transforming their body shape and color to disappear or mimicking their deadliest enemy. Octopus use shape-shifting superpowers to survive.
2	"Masterminds"	Adam Geiger	Patrick Makin	April 21, 2024
Deeply curious, strategic, and super smart - the octopus is one of nature's ultimate problem solvers.
3	"Social Networkers"	Adam Geiger	Patrick Makin	April 21, 2024
Octopuses, long believed solitary creatures, exhibit surprisingly sociable traits, challenging conventional wisdom about their behavior.

== Production ==
Secrets of the Octopus was announced on February 2, 2022, alongside twelve other National Geographic series as part of their streaming deal with Disney+, including its predecessor Secrets of the Elephants.

Following the previous iterations of the Secrets of franchise, which focused on whales and elephants respectively, executive producer James Cameron spoke about his excitement at exploring the world of octopuses, noting that he studied marine biology in the early 1970s, and was particularly fascinated by the discoveries that were being made about the octopus at the time. Speaking about the inspiration for the series, Cameron explained "I've always held the octopus in very high regard as a science fiction writer. I always imagined that when that flying saucer lands on the White House lawn and the ramp comes down, it's going to be something that looks like an octopus that comes out. The beauty of this octopus series is they live relatively shallow, and you can pretty much do your work on scuba. This is about human patience, human understanding, and creation. In the case of Dr. Alex Schnell, for example, who is our featured marine scientist, it's about creating a bond with individual animals of these different species and just observing them, then applying some science to interpret what you're seeing."

== Reception ==
Ahead of its premiere, The Guardian highlighted Secrets of the Octopus as one of the best seven shows to watch that week, stating "the octopus clearly becomes more fascinating the closer to it you get. It's a beautifully shot and at times genuinely psychedelic insight into an otherworldly realm." In a positive review, Tony Bradley of Forbes wrote "A significant portion of the series is dedicated to capturing behaviors never before filmed, offering viewers an unprecedented look at how octopuses interact with their environment and other species. This includes their unique reproductive strategies, where female octopuses sacrifice their lives for the next generation, and their ability to "think" with their arms, each of which has a mind of its own. Paul Rudd's narration adds a layer of warmth and humanity to the series, inviting viewers to connect deeply with the narrative. His enthusiasm for the subject matter is palpable, as he expresses awe and admiration for the octopuses' capabilities and the scientists who study them."

Writing for The Wall Street Journal, John Anderson praised the cinematography, calling the series "visually stunning" and noting that "the information is fascinating, but the movement, the colors and the precision of the photography are exhilarating. So are the moments apparently never before captured: the actual mating process, and the use of a clam shell for self-defense. The terrestrial participants in the show are beside themselves. Their enthusiasm is infectious."

=== Accolades ===
Year	Award	Category	Nominee(s)	Result	Ref.
2024	Primetime Creative Arts Emmy Award	Outstanding Narrator	Paul Rudd (for "Masterminds")	Nominated	
