= All's Well That Ends Well (iZombie) =

- iZombie episode
- Episode no.: Season 5 Episode 13
- Directed by: Jason Bloom
- Written by: Rob Thomas
- Production code: T27.13863
- Original air date: August 1, 2019

Guest appearances
- Chris Lowell as Byron Deceasey; Jennifer Irwin as Dolly Durkins; Daran Norris as Johnny Frost

Episode chronology
← Previous "Bye, Zombies"	Next → —

"All's Well That Ends Well" is the series finale of the American science fiction television series iZombie. It was released on The CW on August 1, 2019. The series revolves around medical examiner Olivia Moore, who was turned into a zombie and must eat brains to sustain herself and solve crimes. The episode was written by Rob Thomas and directed by Jason Bloom.

== Plot ==
Clive, Ravi, and Liv fly back to Seattle with the assistance of a police officer whose sister Liv had saved. Clive arrives at the hospital just in time for the birth of his daughter. Peyton helps the kids to escape Blaine, but is hit by bullets. Blaine turns her into a zombie to save her; he and Don E. feed her the brain of one of Blaine's men whom she had just killed. Blaine then leaves the pair and goes to the well that his father used to be trapped in. After eating the brain, Peyton has a vision and tells Don E. that Blaine killed Darcy, his fiance. This angers Don E., who goes to push Blaine into the well. Liv arrives and pushes Don E. into the well. Peyton approaches Liv and the pair reunite. Back at the morgue, Ravi starts to produce the cure.

Ravi and Major then visit a Seattle news station to convince Johnny Frost to take the cure. He refuses, but makes an announcement that the cure is in production before being kicked off the air by Filmore-Graves leader Enzo, who calls the cure a hoax. Major injects himself with a cure syringe on camera and tells Enzo to shoot him anywhere but the head to prove that the cure works, and he is human again. Enzo does and Ravi attacks him, giving him the cure. Now human and vulnerable, Enzo is killed by Graham, who is then killed by an unnamed soldier. It is then revealed that Major is still a zombie since his syringe contained only an energy drink. Dolly then kills her zombie son who had joined Filmore-Graves. Back at the police station Michelle goes to comfort Liv, then a suicide bomber enters the morgue and detonates the bombs, killing Michelle.

Ten years later, Clive, Ravi, and Peyton appear on a virtual talk show. Clive and Dale have adopted Michelle's son and live in San Francisco. Ravi leads the CDC, while Peyton is an attorney in Atlanta. The trio reveal that the fates of Liv and Major are unknown to the public. After the show ends, Liv and Major appear as well. They are still zombies and live with their children on an island. Liv and Major offer their pseudo-immortality to their friends so they can be together again.

== Production ==
The episode was written by showrunner and series creator Rob Thomas, and directed by Jason Bloom. Jennifer Irwin and Daran Norris guest star as Dolly Durkins and Johnny Frost respectively. According to Thomas, the series was always meant to have a happy ending. In an interview with TVLine, Thomas stated that the person who would push Blaine into the well was thoroughly debated in the writer's room.

The episode features various nods to a different show by Thomas, Veronica Mars. In the episode's opening scene, Liv is confused for Veronica Mars star Kristen Bell. Bell had previously made a voice-only cameo in the episode "Fifty Shades of Grey Matter" as herself reading an erotica audiobook. Chris Lowell makes a cameo appearance in the epilogue as a podcast host named Byron Deceasey. Lowell previously played Stosh Piznarski on Veronica Mars. Rob Thomas initially wanted Dax Shepard to cameo instead; despite this, Thomas had been trying to get Lowell a part on iZombie as early as the first season, going as far to name a character after him.

== Release ==
"All's Well That Ends Well" was first broadcast on The CW on August 1, 2019. During its initial broadcast, it was watched by 750,000 viewers; it was the third-highest viewed episode of the season. Before the episode's release, Thomas confirmed that the episode would not end the series on a cliffhanger and all major story lines would be resolved. The first teaser for the episode was released in late July 2019.

=== Reception ===
"All's Well That Ends Well" was met with lukewarm reception from critics, many of which compared the episode to Veronica Mars. The performance of Jennifer Irwin as Dolly Durkins in the episode was praised by critics. Writing for Paste, Leila Jordan described the episode as "messy". Jordan felt that the episode rushed the conclusion of the various story threads of the series. She worried that the ending might taint perception of the series similarly to how did the ending of Game of Thrones.

Writing for Den of Geek, Kayti Burt praised the episode on its silliness and ending moments, rating it a 3/5. Burt felt that the while the episode was not one best finales, it was still a "fun watch". However, she felt that the episode had solid flaws, including multiple fake-out deaths, poor supporting characters, and very few personal moments between characters.

Writing for The A.V. Club, LaToya Ferguson rated the episode a C−, criticizing the many death fake outs, the handling of Michelle – who she described as "more of a plot device then a character" – and how the episode did a poor job paying off Enzo's plans. Ferguson praised the scene of Blaine's death, claiming that his death at the hands of Don E. was "something poetic" given the poor treatment Blaine had given him. She then noted how the happy ending of the episode was not as emotional as it intended to be.

In March 2022, nearly three years after its airing, Paste revisited the finale and reflected that both the episode and final season as a whole seemed to have suffered due to Rob Thomas' preoccupation with the concurrent revival of Veronica Mars, and stated, "The finale of iZombie was one of the worst TV-viewing experiences I have ever had. As the minutes unfolded, I became filled with horror watching everything fall apart. The characters I had loved for five seasons turned into strangers. And when the credits finally rolled, I found myself questioning all the love I had put into it." The same month, Rahul Kohli admitted dissatisfaction with the finale, saying that he felt that it "sucked" and was "super disappointing".
