= List of iZombie episodes =

iZombie is an American television series developed by Rob Thomas and Diane Ruggiero-Wright for the CW. It is an adaptation of the comic book series of the same name created by Chris Roberson and Michael Allred and published by DC Comics under their Vertigo imprint.

iZombie was officially picked up on May 8, 2014, and premiered on March 17, 2015. iZombie was renewed for a fifth and final season in May 2018. During the course of the series, 71 episodes of iZombie aired over five seasons.

== Series overview ==
| Season | Episodes | Originally released | | Rank | Average viewers (in millions inc. DVR) |
| Season | Episodes | First released | Last released | Rank | Average viewers (in millions inc. DVR) |
|---|---|---|---|---|---|
| 1 | 13 | March 17, 2015 | June 9, 2015 | 154 | 2.51 |
| 2 | 19 | October 6, 2015 | April 12, 2016 | 174 | 1.68 |
| 3 | 13 | April 4, 2017 | June 27, 2017 | 160 | 1.37 |
| 4 | 13 | February 26, 2018 | May 28, 2018 | 191 | 1.24 |
| 5 | 13 | May 2, 2019 | August 1, 2019 | 140 | 1.01 |

== Episodes ==
=== Season 1 (2015) ===
| No. overall | No. in season | Title | Directed by | Written by | Original release date | Prod. code | US viewers (millions) |
|---|---|---|---|---|---|---|---|
| 1 | 1 | "Pilot" | Rob Thomas | Rob Thomas & Diane Ruggiero-Wright | March 17, 2015 | 296850 | 2.29 |
Having been transformed into a zombie during a boat party and forced to give up on her old dreams and family ties, Liv Moore finds herself assisting rookie Detective Clive Babineaux in the investigation of a murdered Romanian prostitute when her boss, Ravi, introduces her as a psychic after she has a flash of insight about the victim based on the consumed brains. Meanwhile, Liv struggles to keep her undead existence a secret from her roommate, Peyton, as well as her former fiancé, Major.
| 2 | 2 | "Brother, Can You Spare a Brain?" | John Kretchmer | Diane Ruggiero-Wright | March 24, 2015 | 3J5502 | 1.99 |
Liv develops a painting obsession when she eats the brain of a murdered artist that Clive is investigating. Liv also encounters another zombie for the first time in the form of the drug-dealer, Blaine DeBeers, who was unintentionally responsible for her transformation. Blaine asks that Liv supply him with brains from the morgue, but Liv quickly begins to distrust him. Blaine then kills his former drug dealing contacts as well as infects a woman that he picks up from a local bar.
| 3 | 3 | "The Exterminator" | Michael Fields | Story by : Rob Thomas; Teleplay by : Graham Norris & Lee Arcuri | March 31, 2015 | 3J5503 | 1.81 |
While investigating the murder of a sociopath hitman, Liv becomes emotionally distant after eating his brain, causing her to make increasingly morally questionable decisions, including interfering with Peyton's court case as well as bad-mouthing Clive's investigation. Meanwhile, Liv and Ravi discover another zombie hidden away who happens to be Marcy, Liv's old work friend. With Marcy having regressed to a "standard" zombie mentality, Ravi hopes that providing her with food will help him determine a cure for Liv. Also, Blaine continues his quiet killing spree across Seattle and his latest victim is a friend of Major.
| 4 | 4 | "Liv and Let Clive" | John Kretchmer | Kit Boss | April 7, 2015 | 3J5504 | 1.77 |
When her latest brain causes Liv to experience a flash of Clive apparently brutally assaulting a gang member, she begins to suspect that he is a dirty cop. Liv tries to convince Ravi to move in with Major to keep another girl from being close to him. Meanwhile, Blaine sets up a brain selling business for his newly turned zombies. Two of his men attempt to set up shop for themselves and face the consequences.
| 5 | 5 | "Flight of the Living Dead" | David Warren | Deirdre Mangan | April 14, 2015 | 3J5505 | 1.85 |
A skydiving trip turns into a disaster when Holly White (Tasya Teles), an ex-sorority student and Liv's friend, is found dead and a fellow skydiver accuses one person, Lowell Tracy (Bradley James). Liv asks Babineaux to pursue Holly's death as a new case even though it is not listed as a homicide. He interrogates the witness, Tracy, and they find out the GoPro footage was deleted. Other witnesses include Ren Smith (Blair Penner), an athlete with a sponsorship deal from the energy drink company Max Rager, Eliza Marquette (Summer Bishil), an executive at Max Rager who claims the footage was deleted on account of graphic images, and Carson McComb (Ryan Hansen), a pro snowboarder. Liv has a vision of McComb which implies that he is in an intimate relationship with Smith. Later, Babineaux manages to get the case listed as a homicide. Liv attends a memorial for Holly, in which the team asks Liv to leave, to no effect. Liv discovers Lowell is a zombie, with him hitting on her in the process. McComb is accused of obtaining the drug, where he reveals that Eliza is the real killer.
| 6 | 6 | "Virtual Reality Bites" | Dermott Downs | Gloria Calderon Kellett | April 21, 2015 | 3J5506 | 1.80 |
Liv's newly-acquired hacking skills may be the key to cracking their latest case when a reclusive hacker known for posting critical reviews is murdered, but she also has to deal with the victim's agoraphobia.
| 7 | 7 | "Maternity Liv" | Patrick Norris | Bob Dearden | April 28, 2015 | 3J5507 | 1.69 |
When a young pregnant woman is found murdered by campers, Liv develops strong maternal instincts while trying to investigate the case. Meanwhile, Major's investigations into the missing persons become complicated when he inadvertently alienates Clive, and his own efforts at detective work result in him being arrested.
| 8 | 8 | "Dead Air" | Zetna Fuentes | Aiyana White | May 5, 2015 | 3J5509 | 1.62 |
When a radio host known for relationship straight talk is murdered on air, a rival show host is suspect. Liv applies the host's uncompromising psychological insight to those around her, annoying Clive and making Ravi uncomfortable. Peyton and Ravi spark up a moment when they cross paths unexpectedly while seeking to get Major released from jail. Liv repeatedly tries to convince Ravi that Peyton is not his type, even while Liv's relationship with Lowell heats up. The tested lab rat bites Ravi. Leaving Lowell's apartment, Liv sees Blaine arriving with a delivery. Liv gets a vision of Jerome in Blaine's car.
| 9 | 9 | "Patriot Brains" | Guy Bee | Robert Forman | May 12, 2015 | 3J5508 | 1.70 |
A retired elite sniper turned paintball instructor is found dead during a game and the prime suspects are his ex-wife and her new husband. Ravi is relieved to discover the infection cannot jump across species. The Candyman attacks Major at his home, but flees after being repeatedly shot. Liv confronts Lowell about the brains that he purchases from Blaine and decides Blaine should die. When Liv decides to not go with the plan, Lowell attempts to kill Blaine himself, but ends up being shot in the head instead.
| 10 | 10 | "Mr. Berserk" | Jason Bloom | Deirdre Mangan & Graham Norris | May 19, 2015 | 3J5510 | 1.50 |
After Blaine kills Lowell, Liv is taken into custody and is questioned by the police. Lt. Suzuki cuts the interrogation short and orders the case closed as a suicide. Meanwhile, Rebecca Hinton, an alcoholic reporter, is found dead. She had been working on the missing children case and was collecting evidence for aggressive behavior caused by Max Rager. The murder leads to a bigger conspiracy involving the energy drink company, which is the suspected cause of the zombie outbreak. As Liv is closing in on the truth, a company "enforcer" named Sebastian Meyer attacks Liv. Unaware that she is a zombie, he attempts to drown her, but she overpowers him. Major, who believes he is going crazy, admits himself for psychiatric help. At the institute, he meets Scott E., who describes to Major what he believes are zombies.
| 11 | 11 | "Astroburger" | Michael Fields | Kit Boss | May 26, 2015 | 3J5511 | 1.56 |
At the mental institute, Major's chess buddy, Scott E., is murdered. He was delusional about being chased by the devil, and he had told Major that he recorded a cell phone video of the zombies at the Lake Washington boat party. After eating Scott's brain, Liv becomes delusional, too. Major leaves the institute to search for Scott E.'s phone. From Scott E.'s apartment, he follows Blaine to the butcher's shop, where he steals the delivery of astronaut brain. Liv finds Scott E.'s murderer and his phone, but the video incriminates herself. Ravi succeeds in finding a cure on his test rat. Major declares to a horrified Liv that he will hunt down and kill all the zombies.
| 12 | 12 | "Dead Rat, Live Rat, Brown Rat, White Rat" | Mairzee Almas | Diane Ruggiero-Wright | June 2, 2015 | 3J5512 | 1.80 |
In a flashback to the evening of his fight with Liv, Sebastian awakens as a zombie, having been infected by Liv's blood, and is hit by group of local rockband players with their stolen car. They take his thumb drive before he attacks them and kills one of them. Two weeks later, Liv and Clive investigate the murder; Liv, after consuming the victim's brain, develops a high-school cheerleader persona. Ravi's cured zombie rat dies, so he restarts his experiment with the last Utopium. Liv is taken aback when she realizes that Sebastian is undead and that she is the reason for his condition. When Sebastian shows up at Liv's apartment to kill her, he attacks a defenseless Peyton. Liv soon arrives; in the ensuing fight, both of them sink into "full-on zombie mode", and Liv kills him before the eyes of a horrified Peyton. Liv finally reveals to her that she is a zombie, and Peyton abandons her. Major prepares to attack Blaine's meat shop only to be captured. Liv's brother drops off an application and is hired by Blaine as his new errand boy. Someone begins killing off the remaining rockband players responsible for hitting Sebastian.
| 13 | 13 | "Blaine's World" | Michael Fields | Rob Thomas | June 9, 2015 | 3J5513 | 1.45 |
Blaine is holding Major captive in the freezer to force him to reveal the location of the stolen brains. Ravi produced two doses of experimental cure with his last tainted utopium. Liv and Clive continue to investigate the rock band killings after Teresa is found murdered. They meet with Max Rager CEO Vaughn Du Clark who maintains that Sebastian has not been working at the company for several months. Vaughn knows that Sebastian and Liv are zombies and that Max Rager mixed with utopium is the original cause. He asks his scientist to ensure their new Super Max energy drink will not have the same problem, and plans to deal with the existing zombies. Clive finds the last rockband member and obtains Rebecca's research. While Blaine meets Liv to obtain his brains, Major breaks out and kills everyone at the shop. Blaine returns and stabs Major just before Liv arrives. She uses the cure on Blaine to prevent him from making more zombies, and turns Major into a zombie to save him. She later turns him back with the last cure. Suzuki tries to clean up the butcher shop with a gas explosion in which Liv's brother is injured.

=== Season 2 (2015–16) ===
| No. overall | No. in season | Title | Directed by | Written by | Original release date | Prod. code | US viewers (millions) |
|---|---|---|---|---|---|---|---|
| 14 | 1 | "Grumpy Old Liv" | Michael Fields | Rob Thomas | October 6, 2015 | 3J5901 | 1.53 |
Three months have passed since Liv turned Blaine and Major back to normal with the last remaining cure. As a side effect, they can now detect zombies. Major works as a personal trainer, while Blaine runs a funeral home which provides a source of brains for his clients and a cover for his utopium-dealing business. Liv remains estranged from both her mother Eva and younger brother Evan for refusing to give him a blood transfusion to avoid her secret being discovered. She consumes the brain of a cantankerous old man who had made plenty of enemies among his neighbors. Together with Detective Clive Babineaux she tracks down the murderer. Ravi is out of the tainted utopium from the night of the boat party required to produce the cure, so Liv asks Blaine, who tries to find out who had cut the utopium. Liv's new roommate, Gilda, is working for Vaughn Du Clark and is secretly spying on her. Vaughn plans the release of the new Super Max energy drink and must deal with the zombie problem. When he learns about Major's special ability, he makes him work as his zombie killer, threatening to kill Liv if he refuses.
| 15 | 2 | "Zombie Bro" | John Kretchmer | Diane Ruggiero-Wright | October 13, 2015 | 3J5902 | 1.22 |
Liv and Clive investigate the murder of a frat pledge captain. Liv's consuming the frat guy's brains makes her feel more outgoing. In a darkly humorous twist, the frat guy was killed by accident, due to having the same name as another student; said student had drunkenly run over the murderer's father and had cleaned up his act by activity discouraging drinking. Due to the name mix up, the killer thought his father's killer had not changed and seethed with rage. Ravi asks Major to help him acquire some utopium to gather some first-hand experience on its effects, which ends with a bad low, and Major becoming addicted to the substance. Meanwhile, Blaine is expanding his utopium trade in his effort to control the city, but his unseen rival, Stacey Boss, retaliates by killing his dealers. Blaine approaches the zombie District Attorney Floyd Baracus to go after Boss, who demands the money needed to bribe the police and judges. Blaine then approaches his estranged zombie father, Angus, a businessman. Angus agrees to give Blaine the money, but Blaine demands Angus' entire company. Liv's attempts to approach Major are unsuccessful.
| 16 | 3 | "Real Dead Housewife of Seattle" | Jason Bloom | Kit Boss | October 20, 2015 | 3J5903 | 1.29 |
Liv and Clive investigate the murder of Taylor, a rich housewife who once had an affair with Vaughn. The leads point to a murder-for-hire contract and Liv, after consuming the dead Taylor's brain, becomes fashion obsessed, which baffles Clive. Meanwhile, Major is still hunting and kidnapping zombies for Max Rager. He is seduced by Gilda, who is revealed to be Vaughn's daughter, while Liv is still unaware about her secret alliance with the enemy. Major continues using utopium while keeping it a secret from Liv. Meanwhile, Peyton returns to town and is announced as the leader of the new task force against the utopium trade. Peyton reconciles with Liv, Major and Ravi. When Taylor's husband, Terrence, plans to take revenge on Vaughn for his tryst with Taylor with a hostile takeover of Max Rager, Vaughn feeds Terrence to his previous scientist, now a zombie.
| 17 | 4 | "Even Cowgirls Get the Black and Blues" | Matt Barber | Deirdre Mangan | October 27, 2015 | 3J5904 | 1.47 |
Liv and Peyton reconcile. The murder investigation of a strangled woman turns Liv into a passionate country singer. FBI Agent Dale Bozzio is investigating a series of unsolved missing person cases (all of which are zombie-related). She is also interested in Clive. Blaine is wondering about his disappearing zombie customers, too. He collaborates with Peyton and gives her information about Boss' utopium trade in exchange for immunity. Blaine catches Preach, who was responsible for tainting the utopium at the boat party. When Preach refuses to divulge his secret recipe, Blaine turns him into a zombie, knowing that he will have to come back for brains. Major's utopium use takes its toll on him and he turns to Liv for help.
| 18 | 5 | "Love & Basketball" | Michael Fields | Bob Dearden | November 3, 2015 | 3J5905 | 1.43 |
A children's basketball coach is assassinated while working as a security guard. Clive and Liv investigate and Major takes over the coaching. Preach cuts the "boat party" tainted utopium for Blaine, who has it delivered to Ravi. Preach injects himself with the tainted utopium/MR mixture, thinking it is a cure, but it fails the test. Max Rager's new head scientist wants an intelligent zombie specimen. Faking a kitchen accident, Gilda steals a blood sample from Liv. Dale finds the astronaut's hair in the sink at Meat Cute. Clive asks Suzuki's widow whether he was suicidal, which causes trouble at the precinct. She then finds some brains in her freezer. Major reports the zombie suspects as negatives to spare them, which Gilda disbelieves. He breaks up with Gilda, & flushes his utopium. He & Liv get back together, but do not have sex because she is afraid she might accidentally turn him into a zombie.
| 19 | 6 | "Max Wager" | John Kretchmer | Graham Norris | November 10, 2015 | 3J5907 | 1.40 |
Harry Cole is murdered over rigging college sport gambling. The investigation leads Liv and Clive to The Barber, who is the city's bookie. His barbershop is also frequented by Boss, who visits Peyton and threatens her to try to stop the investigation into him. Boss may have learned that her source is Blaine. Clive goes on a date with Dale and they meet Major. Major learns about the FBI investigations on the missing persons, who are the zombies he is disposing of for Max Rager. Ravi discovers that condoms cannot protect against the zombie virus, so Liv and Major cannot have sex. Blaine's father takes over the business after discovering Blaine is no longer a zombie. Blaine kills his beloved grandfather to use his brain to weaken his father and reclaim his business. Major captures Blaine's father and freezes him.
| 20 | 7 | "Abra Cadaver" | Viet Nguyen | Justin Halpern & Patrick Schumacker | November 17, 2015 | 3J5906 | 1.17 |
Clive and Liv investigate a murder at a magicians' convention. Blaine asks Liv to help him find out about the disappearing zombies. They break into Dale's apartment and look through her evidence collection, and intercept an FBI report stating that the brain in Suzuki's freezer was human, and Liv changes it to state that it was cow brain. Peyton tells Blaine that Boss knows it may have been him who gave her the inside information about his organization. When Liv delivers the faked report to Bozzio's house, she is seen by a woman who in turn leaves an anonymous note there. Ravi breaks up with his girlfriend, Steph, and tries an advance on Peyton. Major struggles with Liv's brain identities.
| 21 | 8 | "The Hurt Stalker" | Michael Wale | Sara Saedi | December 1, 2015 | 3J5908 | 1.55 |
Regina Summer is murdered with Clive's gun and he is suspended pending the investigation. He was dating Regina before Dale, but dropped her when she started to stalk him. She had left a scrapbook of Photoshopped pictures at Dale's doorstep, as she was jealous of her. Regina's brains make Liv act jealous, and Liv finds the text messages between Major and "Rita". The new Super Max drink makes the zombie test subjects faster and stronger; when Vaughn drinks it for his workout, he becomes very aggressive, too. When Liv tries to retrieve Regina's album from Chief Price's car, where he hid it to save his marriage as he, too, was involved with Regina, she is caught and lands in jail. Ravi gets her out and they trace the evidence to a couple who had hired Regina as wedding planner.
| 22 | 9 | "Cape Town" | Mairzee Almas | Diane Ruggiero-Wright | December 8, 2015 | 3J5909 | 1.37 |
The Fog, a vigilante crime fighter, is murdered while intervening in the apparent mugging of a woman, Mary. Liv and Clive find out the Fog intended to prevent a weapons shipment to Boss. Blaine asks Liv to turn a drug dealer, Drake, into a zombie, because he's the only one who knows where the tainted utopium is. Major meets a zombie who has been prostituting herself for brains; she tries to commit suicide, but he stops her and freezes her instead. Having eaten The Fog's brain, Liv disguises herself as a vigilante to stop the weapons shipment herself, and is nearly killed by Mary, who has been robbing Boss. Boss kills Mary, and Liv is saved. Liv breaks up with Major. Ravi finds his cured rat turned back into a zombie.
| 23 | 10 | "Method Head" | Mark Piznarski | Kit Boss | January 12, 2016 | 3J5910 | 1.17 |
Ravi explains to both Major and Blaine that the cure is only temporary, and they will eventually revert to zombie form unless they get "cure" booster-shots. Ravi and Major dig for the corpses of the drug couriers who body-packed the tainted utopium, but without success. Meanwhile, Clive and Liv, after a bump in their relationship, investigate a murder on the set of Liv's favorite zombie television show, where they suspect two of the actors (Zack Peladeau and Skyler Day). With Boss' organization targeted by the DA, Blaine's funeral-home/brain-delivery business is running well, but Dale investigates him and begins to connect Blaine to the Meat Cute massacre. Vaughn tests Major's allegiance; Major passes, as he planted a listening device on Vaughn beforehand.
| 24 | 11 | "Fifty Shades of Grey Matter" | Mairzee Almas | Deirdre Mangan & Graham Norris | February 2, 2016 | 3J5911 | 1.43 |
A librarian and author of an upcoming erotic novel is poisoned. Liv and Blaine investigate. Blaine gives Peyton more information about Boss and they sleep together. Dale tries to find the "Chaos Killer" by GPS-tracking the dog of one of his victims, so Major has to get rid of Minor. Dale finds evidence that make her suspect that Blaine is the Chaos Killer and arrests him, but Peyton asks her to set him free as he is her star witness against Boss. However, the information that Dale presented makes Peyton suspicious; she asks Liv about Blaine and is devastated when she learns the truth. Drake ends up in Liv's bed.
| 25 | 12 | "Physician, Heal Thy Selfie" | Zetna Fuentes | Talia Gonzalez & Bisanne Masoud | February 9, 2016 | 3J5912 | 1.43 |
When Boss sends three of his men to kill DA Baracus, he kills and decapitates them and goes into hiding. Their bodies are found in Lake Washington without the heads, so Liv can get no clues from their brains. Instead, she eats the brain of a vlogger. When Boss meets Blaine at the funeral of his nephew, he demands his profits from the boat party, with interest. Blaine learns that Peyton knows about Liv and the zombies. Peyton wants to resign, but her request is denied as the DA is missing. The police investigation into the Chaos Killer turns up a utopium turf war between Boss' stuff and a new cut called "Lucky U", which Liv, upon she seeing Don E. in a vision, discovers is distributed by Blaine. Vaughn realizes that Baracus is a zombie, despite what Major has told him; he then blackmails Major into finishing the job, and Baracus ends up in his freezer.
| 26 | 13 | "The Whopper" | Michael Fields | Rob Thomas | February 16, 2016 | 3J5913 | 1.25 |
Still digging for the dead utopium couriers, Ravi and Major unearth the body of Corey "Big Fish" Carp, a pathological liar and criminal who was working for Boss. A vision shows Liv that Carp both killed the utopium couriers (Vic Parisi and Lonny Evans), and shot Drake before he was killed by Don E. and buried. Carp's gun is found to have been used in an unsolved drug-smuggling related murder. Clive finds the previous suspect, Terrell Johnson. When Boss learns Johnson's location, he sends Drake to kill him. Don E. and Chief catch Major when he goes after a zombie customer of Blaine's. Blaine demands to know who hired him, but Major will not tell—he does, however, offer to bring back Blaine's father, who had disinherited his son in the case of an unnatural death. Blaine tries to force him to change his will. Finally, through Liv's vision, Ravi and Major find the location of the buried drug dealers with the tainted utopium.
| 27 | 14 | "Eternal Sunshine of the Caffeinated Mind" | Jason Bloom | Kit Boss | February 23, 2016 | 3J5914 | 1.45 |
The death of the owner of Ravi's favorite coffee shop, "Positivity", leaves Liv seeing the bright side to everything around her. The newly-found tainted utopium does not cure Ravi's rat. Drake is revealed to be undercover for the police. Shortly after losing his sense of taste, Blaine finds himself killed by Mr. Boss, who found out Blaine was working against him with the DA. However, Blaine resurrects as a zombie. Also, Liv discovers that her roommate Gilda is actually Rita, Major's lover.
| 28 | 15 | "He Blinded Me... with Science" | Dan Etheridge | John Enbom | March 22, 2016 | 3J5915 | 1.21 |
Liv and Detective Babineaux investigate the murder of a research scientist who lost her job after a drug trial went wrong, but their suspect, the disfigured victim of the trial, fixed the damage with plastic surgery. Major finds out that Rita is Vaughn's daughter. Ravi informs a re-zombified Blaine that the cure might kill him. Bozzio and Babineaux learn that Blaine's father and Suzuki had human brains in their freezers. Under the effects of the murdered scientist's brain, Liv tries to find out the truth about Drake's behavior. Also, in her visions, she discovers that the murdered scientist worked with zombies at Max Rager. Babineaux learns the trial victim is still disfigured and that her identical twin sister killed the scientist in revenge. Ravi gives Blaine an untested emergency cure; Blaine injects himself with it after he cannot stop coughing. Liv finds out Drake works for Mr. Boss, but Major freezes Drake before she can confront him. In the Max Rager's secret basement, Rita becomes a zombie after Vaughn allows her to be trapped with a zombie he accidentally freed.
| 29 | 16 | "Pour Some Sugar, Zombie" | Mairzee Almas | Diane Ruggerio-Wright | March 29, 2016 | 3J5916 | 1.25 |
Blaine is not quite himself lately, and Ravi discovers that the new cure causes memory loss. Major and Ravi help Peyton move back in with Liv when she receives a surprising phone call from a stripper about information pertaining to Mr. Boss. However, the stripper is murdered before she has a chance to meet Peyton. Liv consumes the brain of the stripper and has a vision of the location of one of Mr Boss' drug operations, which leads to Peyton making a big drug bust. Ravi breaks into Major's safe and discovers that Major is the Chaos Killer. Due to the effects of Blaine's amnesia on the business, Don E. makes Chief turn him into a zombie. Looking for Drake, Liv visits Drake's mom, where Liv finally discovers that Drake is an undercover cop. When Ravi confronts Major, the stress makes him turn back into a zombie.
| 30 | 17 | "Reflections of the Way Liv Used to Be" | Michael Fields | Bob Dearden | April 5, 2016 | 3J5917 | 1.07 |
Major comes clean to Ravi about being the Chaos Killer. Liv consumes the brain of Bailey Barker, a type-A, ambitious, hyper-competitive student near the top of her class, who is everything that Liv used to be as a human. Detective Benedetto reveals to Liv that he recruits students to be confidential informants to help him track the supplier of Lucky U. Blaine continues to deal with his memory loss. Major convinces Ravi to help him turn Vaughn into a zombie to test the cure on him. Liv has a vision of Bailey buying drugs from Steve, the snack bar cashier. They deduce that Steve is the prime suspect, but Benedetto arrives at Steve's place first before they do. Benedetto is attacked by Chief while gathering evidence. Chief kills Steve. A witness comes forward to Agent Bozzio to identify Major as the prime suspect in the Chaos killings and she arrests him.
| 31 | 18 | "Dead Beat" | John Kretchmer | John Enbom | April 12, 2016 | 3J5918 | 1.36 |
After Major is arrested as the Chaos Killer, Ravi is arrested as an accomplice. Once free, Ravi tells Liv and Peyton about Vaughn blackmailing Major into being his zombie-killer, but when they head to the warehouse for the sedated victims, they are gone. After private military contractor Vivian Stoll agrees to buy Max Rager, Vaughn wants Major and Liv eliminated. Agent Bozzio and Babineaux attempt to link Major with other crimes after another witness reveals he sold Major weapons used in the Meat Cute massacre. Meanwhile, Blaine tries to help Liv by providing her with brains. Vaughn pays Major's bail, and Liv tries to supply Major with brains in a milkshake when he's released. However, Clive screws things up by arresting Major for the Meat Cute murders before he can get a drink of brains. Liv attempts to get Major a protein bar filled with brains via his lawyer; however, the lawyer loses it to his dog. With no other option, Liv forces Clive to help by proving she's a zombie in a drastic measure; Clive agrees to let Major go before a zombie movie apocalypse happens. While Vaughn's henchman tries to kidnap Liv, Ravi accidentally kills him. Liv eats his brain and gets a vision of Major's victims alive at Max Rager.
| 32 | 19 | "Salivation Army" | Michael Fields | Story by : Rob Thomas & Diane Ruggerio-Wright; Teleplay by : Diane Ruggerio-Wright & Kit Boss | April 12, 2016 | 3J5919 | 1.22 |
Liv, Major and Babineaux infiltrate Vaughn's party celebrating the purchase of Max Rager by a private military contractor, Vivian Stoll. While they try to gain access to the basement to free the Chaos Killer zombies, a few employees foolishly choose to mix tainted utopium and Super Max, starting another zombie massacre. Mr. Boss realizes Don E. and Chief took over Blaine's business and orders them eliminated. His henchmen kill Chief and, when they discover Blaine is still alive, Mr. Boss kidnaps Peyton to force Blaine's hand. Blaine and Ravi plan a rescue, but Blaine engages and kills Mr. Boss' men, and Ravi witnesses Peyton embracing Blaine. At Max Rager, Liv, Major and Babineaux are cornered by zombies, but they're saved by Vivian Stoll, who leaves to get reinforcements. Liv and Babineaux free the zombie prisoners, but Liv is forced to kill Drake, who has turned into a Super Max zombie, to save Babineaux. Major traps Vaughn to be killed by zombie-mode Rita and two Super Max zombies, and shoots Rita afterwards. Vivian Stoll's army shows up, leading Liv to the discovery that they are zombies, and have plans to establish Seattle as a zombie haven.

=== Season 3 (2017) ===
| No. overall | No. in season | Title | Directed by | Written by | Original release date | Prod. code | US viewers (millions) |
|---|---|---|---|---|---|---|---|
| 33 | 1 | "Heaven Just Got a Little Bit Smoother" | Dan Etheridge | Rob Thomas | April 4, 2017 | T27.13151 | 0.95 |
Vivian Stoll is the new owner of the company Fillmore-Graves. Her military team bombs the building to destroy evidence of the zombie outbreak. Frustrated with Blaine's amnesia, Don E. allies with Angus, Blaine's father, to form a rival company to Blaine's. Liv, Major, and Clive visit Vivian at her office, where she tells them that most of her company employees are zombies who are undergoing military training to defend themselves if humans attack them on "D-Day", or "Discovery Day", the day when humans find out about zombies. Ravi tells Liv that he is upset about Blaine and Peyton's growing attraction to each other. Ravi shows Clive the experiments he's been conducting to restore memory loss, a side-effect of the zombie cure. At a radio show, Billy, one of the security guards of Max Rager, who was there during the outbreak, announces live that he saw zombies eating people. When no one else will hire him, Major gets a job at Fillmore-Graves as a mercenary. Dr. Kupps, Ravi's old boss, examines a body found at Max Rager's. Liv and Ravi go to a murder scene to find Clive devastated, since he knew the murder victims; they were zombies. Liv and Clive realize that some humans know of the existence of zombies and are attacking them.
| 34 | 2 | "Zombie Knows Best" | Jason Bloom | Diane Ruggiero-Wright | April 11, 2017 | T27.13152 | 0.87 |
Liv and Major eat the brains of Stan and his daughter Cindy, respectively. Liv, acting like a 40-year-old, tries to relate to Major, who is acting like a 15-year-old. Major has a vision of Cindy showing something on her phone from a friend, Winslow, to her father, which he tells her to take to the police. Vivian announces her intention to have District Attorney Baracus elected mayor. Clive, Major, and Liv investigate Winslow's family. Liv has a vision of Cindy's phone revealing Winslow's step-father committed statutory rape. They find a parental controls app on Winslow's phone revealing Winslow's mother knew about the relationship between her husband and Winslow. She confesses and she and her husband are arrested. Cavanaugh interviews Clive about the murder of Wally and his family. Clive is revealed to have been a neighbor of the family. During a domestic disturbance, Clive arrested Wally's father. Over time Clive grew close to the family including regular dinners and babysitting Wally. When Wally's father was about to be released from prison, Anna and Wally moved from the apartment to avoid Wally's father. Unfortunately for Clive, he was on a two-weeks case and unable to say goodbye.
| 35 | 3 | "Eat, Pray, Liv" | Mairzee Almas | Graham Norris | April 18, 2017 | T27.13153 | 0.75 |
Major takes some time getting used to training and the new lunches being offered. After failing several exercises, he becomes friends with a man who used to be a DJ, Justin. Meanwhile, Liv eats the brain of a "mindfulness" yoga instructor, channeling his zen personality. As Clive and Liv investigate his death, Liv proves to be less than useful due to her lack of visions. Ravi visits Peyton to try to overcome his mental demons. Major invites his new friend for dinner, but has a coughing fit. Blaine settles into his new job as a lounge singer and spends some time with Peyton. Meanwhile, Blaine's father and Don E. set up their new business, the "Scratching Post". Ravi tries to convince Blaine to try the memory serum that he has been working on. Blaine agrees to take the serum in order to help Major. After Clive does some crackerjack detection, he and Liv proceed to interrogate an old friend of the murdered yogi, and hit him up for the murder. Finally, Peyton confronts Ravi, who admits his love for her: disaster ensues.
| 36 | 4 | "Wag the Tongue Slowly" | Viet Nguyen | Kit Boss | April 25, 2017 | T27.13154 | 0.97 |
Liv eats the brain of an office gossip who's been poisoned to death by a yogurt. Liv, delving into the gossip surrounding the victim's company, hears multiple complaints about the victim. It is revealed the victim was accidentally killed in a prank gone wrong. Liv and Clive review potential suspects for the unsolved murder of Wally and his family by scouting an online Anti-Zombie message board. Major has another coughing fit, but is saved in the nick of time by using a special inhaler. Ravi gives Major the cure and tells him to use it only in case of emergency. Peyton and Blaine grow closer while he waits for Ravi's serum to kick in. Clive and Liv track down a man whose brother was killed in the outbreak at Max Rager, but they have no solid evidence to tie him to Wally's family's murder. Meanwhile, Major finally finds Natalie and gives her Ravi's cure.
| 37 | 5 | "Spanking the Zombie" | Tessa Blake | Sara Saedi | May 2, 2017 | T27.13155 | 0.93 |
Fillmore-Graves mercenaries fight overseas and end a hostage situation; during the battle, Major receives numerous stab wounds, which fail to heal: his condition begins to deteriorate. Meanwhile, Liv eats the brain of a dominatrix named Roxanne Greer, strangled in her dungeon by her own whip. She is cremated, but Ravi keeps her brain to test his amnesia cure. After investigating the crime scene, Liv and Clive find that Greer taped all her sessions, but the memory card is missing. They suspect that the killer could be anyone from her client list, which includes DA Baracus, Johnny Frost, and Brandt Stone. Later, Liv and Clive find that the killer is the victim's neighbor, who used the tapes to blackmail her clients. Don E. has trouble finding employees for the Scratching Post. He later meets up with Blaine's old buyer of utopium and offers him a job in exchange for supplying him with more. Ravi is ready to cure Major, but Liv stops him, knowing that his stab wounds would be fatal to a human. She buys them more time and, the next morning, Major takes the cure despite the risk of amnesia.
| 38 | 6 | "Some Like It Hot Mess" | Enrico Colantoni | John Enbom | May 9, 2017 | T27.13156 | 0.97 |
Major begins to regain his humanity after taking the cure, but both Liv and Ravi fear what will happen if he loses his memories for good. Clive investigates the murder of a narcissistic DJ, and when Liv eats the woman's brain, she begins to act out and behave irresponsibly. One of Don E.'s clients offers him $1 million for Ravi's cure, but the latter refuses. Don E.'s suggestion that Blaine is merely faking his memory loss to get a fresh start intrigues Ravi, and he mentions it to Peyton. Later, Blaine admits that while he did initially lose his memory, it did return in a few days, and he pretended otherwise in a bid to win Peyton's heart. Major returns to his family just as his memories fade, but they soon come back. Clive deduces that the victim's roommate is the murderer. Liv intends to take Ravi's cure herself and become human again, but someone steals it from the morgue. When Major returns, he reveals that he gave the cure syringe Ravi had given him to Natalie.
| 39 | 7 | "Dirt Nap Time" | Michael Fields | Deirdre Mangan | May 16, 2017 | T27.13157 | 0.86 |
Clive is shocked to find that Liv is still a zombie; nevertheless, he has her eat the brain of a murdered preschool teacher who engaged in multiple affairs with his students' mothers. Peyton agrees to help the public defender representing the dominatrix murder suspect convince his client to take a plea deal, but a high-priced lawyer persuades him to reject it, and the suspect later commits suicide in his cell. Major reveals to Justin, his close friend at Fillmore-Graves, that he is human again. Clive and Liv are able to locate a private investigator hired by the husband of one of the victim's many partners, learning that the husband is the real killer. Don E. informs Blaine that he is buying out his business with the help of Blaine's assistant, Candy; one of his men then shoots and severely wounds Blaine on his father's orders. Major and Justin are sent to intercept two anti-zombie militants planning to kill District Attorney Baracus, but in the process, Justin gets run over and attacks Harley Johns and a fellow militant, unintentionally providing them with video evidence that zombies are real.
| 40 | 8 | "Eat a Knievel" | Michael Wale | John Bellina | May 23, 2017 | T27.13158 | 0.98 |
Vivian holds a meeting with Major, Liv, and Clive to discuss the fallout after the release of the zombie footage; afterwards, she takes Major off active duty after confirming that he is no longer a zombie before dying in an accident when her helicopter explodes. An Internet stuntman, Finn Vincible, is killed when a performance goes horribly wrong, and Liv eats his brain to determine that a prank he pulled on his friend, Rudy, is connected to his death. Blaine, having narrowly escaped death by bribing the hitman, reveals his survival to Don E., who then informs his father. Clive and Liv search Rudy's house and discover that his wife had an affair with Finn, which angered Rudy so much that he decided to murder him. Blaine abducts his father and imprisons him in a well, taking over his business. Vivian's brother-in-law, Chase Graves, arrives and assumes control of Fillmore-Graves, declaring that its soldiers must begin preparations for "Discovery Day". Liv disguises herself as a human and tries to infiltrate an anti-zombie meeting along with Ravi, but is forced to leave him behind when she nearly gets recognized.
| 41 | 9 | "Twenty Sided, Die" | Jason Bloom | Kit Boss | May 30, 2017 | T27.13159 | 0.92 |
At the meeting, Harley Johns reveals his plan to capture a zombie and turn it vicious. Ravi persuades the group against it. Afterwards, he meets Rachel, an enthusiastic photographer. Blaine begins to test the brains infused with Ravi's serum to determine its effects. After a Dungeons & Dragons club's gamemaster is poisoned, Liv and Clive learn that his fellow players were bitter about dying during a recent quest. Major receives a letter from Shawna, a woman who is sympathetic because she also had false accusations against her. Peyton learns more about the dominatrix case. With few leads, Liv organizes a game with Major, Ravi, Clive and Peyton. During the round, Liv has a vision that reveals the victim was a hacker. The FBI takes the case with Clive's ex-girlfriend, Dale Bozzio, as lead. Don E. eats a large part of Blaine's infused brains and has a severe episode at the bar. He flees and is captured by Harley's men and brought to Ravi. Elsewhere, Baracus is shot at a fundraiser by an unknown militant sniper and nearly loses control before Liv is able to calm him. However, the militant escapes. Later, Blaine's rival, Stacey Boss, returns to Seattle looking for revenge.
| 42 | 10 | "Return of the Dead Guy" | Viet Nguyen | Talia Gonzalez & Bisanne Masoud | June 6, 2017 | T27.13160 | 0.71 |
Mr. Boss retrieves his go-bag of passports, foreign currency, and diamonds without informing his wife, while the militants prepare to torture Don E. Peyton convinces Liv to eat the brain of her deceased client, but during roleplay, she experiences a side effect that allows her to hallucinate about seeing Drake's ghost. Clive inadvertently triggers another vision revealing that a guard at the prison murdered the victim, but they are unable to find a suspect. Mr. Boss ambushes Blaine and kills him, but is quickly subdued by the latter's superior strength upon his revival as a zombie once more. Liv is bothered by Major's new relationship with Shawna. Liv and Clive get the name of the killer, but learn that he died in an accident shortly after he committed the murder. Mr. Boss wakes up in a coffin, and Blaine persuades him to act as his international broker for acquiring brains. Clive locates the dead man's daughter, but she refuses to talk; as he and Liv drive away, it is revealed that she is a zombie. Liv finally finds the courage to let go of Drake's memory, and she and Blaine go to save Ravi and Don E.
| 43 | 11 | "Conspiracy Weary" | Mark Piznarski | Bob Dearden | June 13, 2017 | T27.13161 | 0.78 |
Liv and Blaine rescue Don E. and Ravi from the anti-zombie militants. Fillmore-Graves soldiers arrive, killing two of the militants. Liv, Don E. and Blaine eat the brain of one of the militants, who was a conspiracy theorist. With her newfound paranoia Liv discovers that Shawna has been posting her personal affairs on Tumblr. Despite her claims of good intentions, Major cuts her out of his life. Peyton's investigation into James Weckler's death goes deeper as she meets with his daughter and discovers she is a zombie after witnessing a vision. Baracus wins the mayoral election. It is revealed that Rachel, the photographer who has taken interest in Ravi, is actually a journalist who was writing a story about "zombie fanatics". Clive and Liv get a lead on the whereabouts of Harley. They track him to the hidden, underground shelter at his cabin. They find Harley when Liv experiences a vision vouching for his innocence in the murder of Wally's family. Liv is unable to inform Clive before Harley fires at gun. Clive returns fire and kills Harley. However, Harley survives and is revealed to now be a zombie. Ravi discovers Rachel's article revealing the existence of zombies.
| 44 | 12 | "Looking for Mr. Goodbrain, Part 1" | Michael Fields | Diane Ruggiero-Wright & John Enbom | June 20, 2017 | T27.13162 | 0.77 |
Liv calls Major, who sedates and freezes Harley. Chase Graves deduces that Major is human from Shawna's posts and fires him. Major's teammates, unaware of Ravi's cure, admire the risks he took as a human and plan a farewell party for him. Liv, now disguised as a human, and Ravi receive a new case—the murder of Ravi's former boss Katty Kupps. A colleague reveals that Kupps was tracing a flu outbreak and interviewing witnesses. Baracus offers to hire Peyton as his chief of staff. Despite her concerns, Peyton takes the job. Natalie returns and comforts Major. Major takes Natalie's offer to join her in Europe to escape his notoriety. Liv meets with a potential witness at a hotel and nearly sleeps with him. After a similar incident the next day, she realizes that Kupps was a sex addict. Liv increasingly feels powerless against those urges, eventually cheating on Justin with Chase. Afterwards, Liv finds a clue suggesting that Chase is tied to Kupps' murder. Clive identifies the daughter of a Fillmore-Graves executive as the likely transmitter of the virus. Harley sneaks into Major's party and detonates an explosive vest, seemingly killing most of the guests.
| 45 | 13 | "Looking for Mr. Goodbrain, Part 2" | Dan Etheridge | Rob Thomas | June 27, 2017 | T27.13163 | 0.86 |
Major voluntarily becomes a zombie again so as to rejoin Fillmore-Graves, while Justin learns of Liv's affair with Chase and breaks up with her. Liv and Clive suspect Chase murdered Kupps, but they discover Fillmore-Graves executive Carey Gold and her daughter are the real killers. Learning Carey also murdered Wally Reid and Vivian, forced James Weckler to kill Roxanne Greer to aid Baracus' campaign, and introduced a deadly disease into the public, Chase kills her, but her plan has enough support among Fillmore-Graves' staff that Chase is forced to proceed with it, using vaccinations against the disease to turn humans into zombies, including Dale Bozzio and Johnny Frost. Liv persuades Johnny to reveal zombies' existence to the public, after which Fillmore-Graves help maintain order between humans and zombies. Ravi develops a potential vaccine for the zombie virus and ingests it, persuading Liv to scratch him to test its effectiveness.

=== Season 4 (2018) ===
| No. overall | No. in season | Title | Directed by | Written by | Original release date | Prod. code | US viewers (millions) |
|---|---|---|---|---|---|---|---|
| 46 | 1 | "Are You Ready for Some Zombies?" | Dan Etheridge | Rob Thomas | February 26, 2018 | T27.13601 | 0.99 |
Seattle, which has been renamed as New Seattle, is protected by a wall, built around the city by the U.S. Government. Liv and Clive investigate the murder of a Seattle Seahawks superfan, who was not a fan of zombies due to the fact their existence cost him his dream job. Turns out his wife killed him after their son Zorn, became a zombie after having sex with his girlfriend (who was one of the victims of the infected vaccines) and disowned him. Chase Graves assigns Major to mentor homeless teen zombies after looking into his past; when one, Jordan, steals brain tubes for her starving siblings, Major decides to recruit her as Fillmore-Graves soldiers get double rations. He also recruits Fisher, who is nicknamed "Captain Seattle" for his superhero-like personality. Angus is rescued out of the well Blaine was keeping him in; he finds a human priest preaching hope to zombies. Hungry, Angus kills him and shares his brain with the zombies. Ravi's zombie cure is revealed to have technically worked, however he relapses into a zombie form for 72 hours once a month as a side effect.
| 47 | 2 | "Blue Bloody" | Michael Fields | Dean Lorey | March 5, 2018 | T27.13602 | 0.77 |
A rich socialite, who always spoke her mind no matter whom it offended, is murdered by one of her assistants; Liv adopts her personality while looking into the case with Clive. Liv has a vision that reveals the servants killed their boss for money to pay a smuggling to get the chef's son past the wall; while the culprits are arrested, Liv helps with the smuggling, meeting Renegade, a sweet old woman going by Mama Leone. While at work on the front-line, Fisher and Jordan, accompanied by Major, witness a group of young adults ganging up on a zombie-friendly restaurant and step in; Jordan rages out chasing one down, unintentionally scratching him. Meanwhile, Angus has taken the robes of the priest he killed and renamed himself "Brother Love" and leads his newfound follows in an attack on their black market brain tune sellers; they steal the tubes and money of the buyers, killing those who disgust Angus.
| 48 | 3 | "Brainless in Seattle, Part 1" | Michael Wale | Heather V. Regnier | March 12, 2018 | T27.13603 | 0.76 |
A woman looking to get snuck into New Seattle was found dead, with most of her brain matter missing. The small bits left behind is all Liv has to eat. The woman easily fell in love, which prompts Liv to very easily swoon for any new guy. In the end, they realize that she was murdered by the coyote who was sneaking her in. Meanwhile, Blaine is asked by Graves to find the coyote Renegade; in exchange, Chase will stop asking him for dirt on the underworld and let him run his businesses in peace. He finds a zombie who had been turned by Renegade, and reveals that he has the cure for zombieism and proceeds to eat his brain.
| 49 | 4 | "Brainless in Seattle, Part 2" | Michael Fields | Heather V. Regnier | March 19, 2018 | T27.13604 | 0.73 |
Liv and Clive continue to look for the coyote killing his rich and desperate clients. Ravi volunteers to pose as bait to lure the coyote out. Meanwhile, Blaine and Don E. are under the effects of the brain of the former zombie Renegade helped into New Seattle; they cannot stop telling the truth about anything in their lives. After a vision, Blaine finds Mama Leone, kills her bodyguards and brings her to Graves. Liv in the meantime, overcomes the helpless romantic brain and discovers a positive; love comes and goes, but her friends are her soulmates.
| 50 | 5 | "Goon Struck" | Joaquin Sedillo | Bob Dearden | March 26, 2018 | T27.13605 | 0.71 |
Liv consumes the brain of one of Renegade's bodyguards who were murdered by Blaine in the previous episode. Major and Don E. work together to kidnap the daughter of a man who wants to nuke Seattle in order to stop the zombie population. A hiccup occurs when they need to scratch her to save her life from a drug overdose. Meanwhile, Chase Graves puts Renegade in zombie jail (freezing zombies) despite persistent efforts from other people calling for Renegade to be executed. Reluctantly, he ends up having to execute Renegade, publicly. As Liv, Ravi, and Peyton, horrified, watch the execution, Liv speaks to one of her associates, Levon, and demands him to gather Renegade's remaining associates–in order to restart her business.
| 51 | 6 | "My Really Fair Lady" | Tessa Blake | Graham Norris | April 9, 2018 | T27.13606 | 0.80 |
While on the brain of a dramatic actress who was in a bus crash, Liv devises a plan to pick up where Mama Leone left off. Levon reveals only three people are still loyal to the cause; the rest of the organization is too scared to return. It is revealed that two coyotes were out on a job during the execution, having accidentally sent five humans in a shipping container; the shipping yard is guarded by Fillmore-Graves. Using the meticulous planning of the brain she is on, Liv comes up with a way to rescue everyone. Liv distracts a security guard while Levon and the others rescue the humans. After they are scratched, Liv sees a family reunite. Levon films everything for future generations to see the good they have done. Meanwhile, Peyton helps a mother find her dog, after her husband, a heroin addict, dies in the bus crash. Ravi eats his brain to help Peyton, as he still has feelings for her. Ultimately, she reunites the mother with the dog, and she thanks Ravi by kissing him, passionately. Blaine finds out his father is out of the well and is the leader of the zombie cult, who stages a protest at Blaine's restaurant to get his followers free food.
| 52 | 7 | "Don't Hate the Player, Hate the Brain" | Tuan Quoc Le | Sara Saedi | April 16, 2018 | T27.13607 | 0.81 |
Liv eats the brain of a professional wing man, who is murdered via poisoned condoms. While on the brain, she comes onto Levon and tries to seduce him into sleeping with her. Simultaneously, she and Levon visit Angus and ask for his help in distributing brains to the zombies that they have smuggled across the New Seattle border. Ravi tries to help Clive get a girl to have sex with, since he and Bozzio cannot without turning Clive into a zombie. Clive has a one-night stand with an escort, and after seeing Dale, finds out he was the first out of the two to have sex with another person. Don E. chops off Dino's head to be taken to Blaine for further questioning. Chase Graves assigns Major as his "Vice President of Getting Stuff Done", and the two storm a newspaper office printing "fake news", where Rachel identifies Major as the Chaos Killer. Peyton catches Liv printing I.D. cards for the zombies she has smuggled across the border.
| 53 | 8 | "Chivalry Is Dead" | Jason Bloom | Diane Ruggiero-Wright | April 23, 2018 | T27.13608 | 0.68 |
Clive takes Ravi and Liv to the scene of the crime, where the victim is described as a medieval history professor who enjoys LARP-ing in his spare time. One of Liv's clients, Isobel, goes missing; however she is brought to Liv, who learns that a Fillmore-Graves soldier they bribe got greedy and wanted more money, hence they needed to find an alternate route. Despite multiple scratches, Isobel does not turn to a zombie. Angus and Blaine's arrangement continues, but Blaine asks him for a favor after Mr. Boss comes to visit him. Mr. Boss needs his account Casper freed, so they collect a duffle bag of cash Casper hid. They persuade Angus to lead his followers on an attack on a prison transport bus heading outside the wall for brains; Casper offers to reveal the location of the loot, but Mr. Boss has Blaine eat his brain. They find the location, but the loot is gone; turns out Casper revealed the location to Peyton in exchange for a ride to a minimum security prison. Peyton gives the cash to the coyote. Russ and Major terrorize zombies as part of Major's undercover mission to learn who Russ' boss is on the black market.
| 54 | 9 | "Mac-Liv-Moore" | Linda-Lisa Hayter | Talia Gonzalez & Bisanne Masoud | April 30, 2018 | T27.13609 | 0.68 |
Ravi finds out about Isobel and helps Liv and Peyton. Major saves Chase Graves' life after his paranoid fears ring true. Blaine gives Don E. a "special brain", which turns out to be the brain of a genius and together the two devise a real estate plan, leading them to kill Baracus.
| 55 | 10 | "Yipee Ki Brain, Motherscratcher!" | Enrico Colantoni | Chelsea Catalanotto | May 7, 2018 | T27.13610 | 0.78 |
Liv gets suspended for beating someone up while on the brain of the corrupt cop Benadetto, meaning she can only do investigations. Angus compares Blaine to zombie god making Blaine attend his church, where he lets his followers kill and eat their old housemaid. Blaine watches this in horror. Liv's comrade, Curtis, gets caught by Chase Graves and is told to give up the name of the new Renegade or meet death, and he tells them a fake story, implicating Brother Love. Isobel tells Ravi she wants to have sex before she dies. To cheer her up, Liv sets Isobel up on a date with the star of Zombie High; Isobel returns home later, with him quite smitten with her. Isobel teases Ravi by suggesting she got to check some things on her list. Liv and Levon are revealed to be in a relationship, and she scratches Curtis to prevent the Fillmore-Graves employees from killing him. Russ and AJ are shown to be working together, and Major figures out Liv is the new Renegade.
| 56 | 11 | "Insane in the Germ Brain" | Jude Weng | Dean Lorey | May 14, 2018 | T27.13611 | 0.72 |
Clive and Dale officially break up after she hears him and Liv talking about Michelle. Russ Roche takes Major to his superior, AJ, and he reveals that he has been working for Fillmore-Graves the whole time. He tells them that he has a tracker and his team storms the building. Chase celebrates that they are gone with a party at The Scratching Post, but Major tells him Russ stole Jordan's gun and Chase makes an attempt on her life. Captain Seattle shoots back at him, and Chase kills him. Peyton prepares to fly to Washington, D.C. as the acting mayor, and her parents tell her not to come back. Liv and Levon bring Isobel's mother into the city, but shortly after, Isobel dies.
| 57 | 12 | "You've Got to Hide Your Liv Away" | Jason Bloom | Diane Ruggiero-Wright & John Bellina | May 21, 2018 | T27.13612 | 0.64 |
Major kidnaps Liv and takes her to Oregon. They eat the brains of an old married couple, but the woman secretly hated the man leading Liv to lock Major in a caged area with two rabid zombies. Clive and Ravi work together in her absence to find the killer of a zombie-turned-human, which brings Brother Love to their attention. As they attempt to arrest him, one of his minions confesses to the murder. Chase threatens to execute Curtis unless Renegade steps forward, which makes Levon falsely confess to being Renegade to protect Liv and save Curtis' life, but when Liv returns to New Seattle she confesses to being Renegade and Chase prepares to execute them both together. Ravi runs tests with Isobel's brain and finds out that it produced a zombie cure, instead of a vaccine.
| 58 | 13 | "And He Shall Be a Good Man" | Dan Etheridge | Rob Thomas | May 28, 2018 | T27.13613 | 0.74 |
Chase prepares to execute Liv and Levon, while Ravi, Peyton and Clive all try to stop him. Major and Jordan work together to distract Fillmore-Graves, which leads them to move up the execution. Liv's associates release Levon's documentary video on her work. Major, during the executions, breaks the door open and saves Liv's life, killing Chase in the process. Major becomes the new commander of Fillmore-Graves. Ravi gives her Isobel's brain and tells her that it is the zombie cure, but Liv decides to give it to Dale after she and Clive get married. Angus leads 1,000 zombies outside the wall, but the US Army shoots them all down and kills them. Earlier that day, the government had announced an end to shipping brains to New Seattle; so that humans either kill zombies in self-defense or all the humans die and New Seattle gets nuked to wipe out the zombie virus. Needing to prevent that, Major is forced to make a deal with Blaine, promising wealth and respectability in exchange for bringing brains into the city. As Liv prepares to retire, she walks into her apartment lobby, where a crowd of zombies and humans cheer her on, and she decides to stay on as Renegade.

=== Season 5 (2019) ===
| No. overall | No. in season | Title | Directed by | Written by | Original release date | Prod. code | US viewers (millions) |
|---|---|---|---|---|---|---|---|
| 59 | 1 | "Thug Death" | Dan Etheridge | Rob Thomas | May 2, 2019 | T27.13851 | 0.73 |
A video showing two zombies devouring a human woman jeopardizes Blaine's ability to maintain New Seattle's brain supply, so the police make finding the killers an urgent priority. Major finds himself struggling with the responsibility of deciding which humans are allowed to leave the city. The CDC assigns a new doctor, Charlie, to assist Ravi with his research; however, their initial meeting goes poorly due to him being on the brain of a professional leg-breaker. Ravi learns that Charli has also discovered the zombie cure, but warns that mass-producing it will lead to teenagers being targeted for their brains. Anti-zombie extremists launch a suicide attack at a Fillmore-Graves checkpoint, killing a number of soldiers. Blaine blackmails several Border Patrol agents to turn a blind eye to his operation, and kills one who refuses to comply. Two girls being smuggled by one of Liv's coyotes are caught without papers by state police.
| 60 | 2 | "Dead Lift" | Michael Fields | Philip Hoover & Jacob Farmer | May 9, 2019 | T27.13852 | 0.58 |
The coyote manages to spring the girls from custody, only to be killed by zombie hunters near the border. With the investigation dragging on, Liv ingests the brains of a fitness guru to help keep herself motivated. Peyton decides to launch a New Seattle PR campaign, only to be stymied by infighting between the city's two remaining councilmen. Jordan is killed by a sniper while on patrol, and some zombies retaliate by shooting up a human-only bar, killing a patron. Ravi proposes making online comedy videos to help de-stigmatize zombies. Bozzio manages to locate the car used in the murder, and it quickly becomes clear that the attack was an elaborate hoax. The police arrest the suspected participants, but Major insists that the zombies who fired on the bar be executed in return. Secretly, however, he arranges for Liv to smuggle them out of the city. To raise money for Ravi's project, Peyton illegally sells the naming rights to the Space Needle.
| 61 | 3 | "Five, Six, Seven, Ate!" | Viet Nguyen | Diane Ruggiero-Wright | May 16, 2019 | T27.13853 | 0.57 |
Ravi and Liv go undercover as dance partners to investigate the poisoning of two contestants in a local dance competition. Peyton is forced to deal with the aftermath of FG personnel entering a school discriminating against zombies, which escalates when one of the students, who happens to be Jordan's brother Michael, gives into his rage and attacks a bully. Clive learns that Michelle is pregnant, but she doesn't know if her baby is his and he refuses to make her take a DNA test. With help from Clive, Ravi gets in shape for the contest, only to mess up his performance when Liv walks off the stage after having a vision. The case is ultimately left unsolved when the prime suspect is himself poisoned without any clues as to who was responsible. Bozzio decides to help support Michelle after recognizing that she has no one else. Major and Peyton turn Michael and his brother Jalen over to Liv for protection as they can no longer attend school.
| 62 | 4 | "dot zom" | Michael Wale | John Enbom | May 23, 2019 | T27.13854 | 0.69 |
The police investigate the poisoning of tech mogul Cornell Piercy, and discover that he was working on a human repopulation project. Blaine meets Al, a zombie writer working on his upcoming magazine profile, and invites her to a soiree. Liv and Major hire Mr. Moss, a recently fired zombie teacher, to work as a tutor. The investigation leads Liv and Clive to Sheldon Drake, a local businessman and zombie bigot. Using Piercy's brain, Liv realizes that he offered to sell his company's user data to Drake in order to fund his project; Clive finds poisonous mushrooms in his backyard and has him charged and arrested. Zombie supremacists kidnap Moss and recruit him as a mole in Liv's operation. A vision leads Liv to deduce that Cornell's former lover Melissa killed him and framed Drake to stop him from using the data to find and kill zombies. Al finds evidence of Mayor Baracus's murder in Blaine's office and decides to secretly investigate him.
| 63 | 5 | "Death Moves Pretty Fast" | Linda-Lisa Hayter | Bob Dearden | May 30, 2019 | T27.13855 | 0.67 |
Blaine is accused of murdering his neighbor, Bitcoin investor Harris Burrows. With Clive immobilized with an injured back, Liv and Ravi take over the case. A newspaper publicizes the zombie cure, leaving Ravi stricken with guilt. Brain tubes made from dementia patients are distributed throughout Seattle, affecting dozens including Major; a subsequent blockade of brain dispensaries triggers a violent response from FG personnel while he's recovering at home. Liv sets up a sting that nets the killer, Harris's disgruntled lackey Hamm. Al stands Blaine up and runs her story, accusing Peyton and the city of covering up his crimes. Major learns that Commander Enzo was responsible for the violence and has him put in the "freezer". Blaine's suppliers cut him off, just as he learns about the existence of the zombie cure and contemplates capitalizing on it. Major learns that, in total, seventeen prisoners have disappeared from FG custody, for no known reason.
| 64 | 6 | "The Scratchmaker" | Malcolm Goodwin | Joshua Levy & Prathi Srinivasan | June 6, 2019 | T27.13856 | 0.67 |
Blaine narrates the events surrounding his arrest for murder: Clive and Liv investigate the murder of professional matchmaker Carol Barbera, Don E contemplates taking over Blaine's operation with Mr. Boss, and Major tries to find a new brain supply. Blaine makes bail and goes to threaten Al, but she tears him down emotionally and forces him to leave. He then finds out that one of his men tossed the remaining cures, leaving him with nothing to sell. Moss arranges for a zombie spy, Riley, to infiltrate Liv's outfit. Boss thanks Al, his niece, for ruining Blaine. Major decides to approach a new supplier rather than deal with Boss's demand that FG pay more for brains. With help from Don's associate Candy, Liv identifies Carol's killer. Bozzio goes on maternity leave, leaving Clive as acting Lieutenant. Don E tells Blaine that Major has a new brain supplier, so Blaine decides to start a new operation: obtaining deals from Freylich teens to provide their postmortem brains to wealthy zombies.
| 65 | 7 | "Filleted to Rest" | Michael Fields | Chelsea Catalanotto | June 13, 2019 | T27.13857 | 0.70 |
Charlie asks Ravi to track down her twin sister Lyla in return for providing the names of Freylich sufferers. Liv eats the brain of chef Eleanor Hickmott, turning her into a demanding perfectionist. An attack on FG by the zombie supremacists leads to the remaining prisoners, including Enzo, being taken. Clive discovers that he is not the father of Michelle's baby, but she still wants him to raise the child. Liv's mother tells her that her biological father, Martin Roberts, is in Seattle. A deserter warns Major that Captain Bell, his close friend, helped plan the attack. Lyla reconnects with her sister and they agree to meet, with Liv having her smuggled out of the city. Clive learns that Hickmott's death was tied to a theft of her restaurant's brain supply, leading them to the killer, a zombie employee. Major sets up a trap for Bell and then shoots him dead when he tries to take a hostage. In the meantime Don E has rebranded The Scratching Post as "Don E's Be Good" to draw customers back by dissociating with Blaine's image. Liv goes to see Martin, who, unbeknownst to her, is the leader of the supremacists.
| 66 | 8 | "Death of a Car Salesman" | Jason Bloom | Christina de Leon | June 20, 2019 | T27.13858 | 0.60 |
A flashback shows Martin, a chemist, developing the Utopium-Max Rager formula for zombification. A car salesman, Rick Randall, is killed when someone hacks his car. Major proposes, to the U.S. government, using FG's unfinished "zombie island" to protect zombies until the cure can be developed. Liv is disgusted to learn Martin is still using Utopium. Clive and Liv discover that Rick's wife was cheating on him, and Ravi has a vision of his car being vandalized. Clive looks into it, and identifies the daughter of a former salesman Rick got fired as a suspect; however, the salesman then admits he killed Rick to protect her. A zombie doctor infects several human delegates working on Major's proposal and sends them back to Washington. Liv decides she's willing to help her father kick his addiction. Don E meets Darcy, one of Blaine's "Freylich girls"; instantly smitten with her, Don realizes she has the same tattoo the matchmaker told him his soulmate would have. Admiring her "live in the moment" attitude, Don starts a barfight at her request. Enzo warns Martin not to let his relationship with Liv interfere with their plans.
| 67 | 9 | "The Fresh Princess" | Tessa Blake | John Bellina | June 27, 2019 | T27.13859 | 0.62 |
After Martin collapses from hunger, Liv moves him to her house. Clive is handed an unusual case: Laurie Beth-Spano, a victim of attempted murder twenty years ago who's recently died under suspicious circumstances. Ravi learns that the police have some tainted Utopium in evidence, but the vials were switched out by Don's twin Scott E. Major deduces that his ward/hostage Sloane has been abducted; Don E and Darcy obtain a brain from one of the kidnappers. Liv moves her mother and Evan out of the city so he can receive desperately needed treatment. Ravi and Peyton find the vials, but they're empty. The next day, Ravi learns that Peyton resigned as mayor under pressure from the City Council. Liv and Clive set a trap to guilt Laurie's mother into confessing. Two feral zombies, including Sloane, are set loose at a public fair by Dolly's CHICs organization to demonize zombies again; FG troops kill them. Ravi and Peyton find Martin's address and realize that he is the man who created Utopium.
| 68 | 10 | "Night and the Zombie City" | Tuan Le | Bob Dearden | July 11, 2019 | T27.13860 | 0.57 |
Liv and Clive solve the murder of a hardboiled private detective. The episode is shot in film noir style.
| 69 | 11 | "Killer Queen" | Jude Weng | John Enbom & Kit Boss | July 18, 2019 | T27.13861 | 0.71 |
Liv and Clive solve the murder of a drag queen. Liv tries to persuade her father to stop killing humans in favor of a better zombie world but while he is talking with his daughter he is killed by Enzo.
| 70 | 12 | "Bye, Zombies" | Michael Wale | Diane Ruggiero-Wright | July 25, 2019 | T27.13862 | 0.61 |
While the government debates on finally nuking Seattle, the head of the committee sees her grandson watching the Hi, Zombie show Peyton funded and realizes zombies are still people with just odd needs; she becomes the deciding vote to get the shipments of brains back to Seattle until zombie island is ready. However, Enzo's Fillmore-Graves loyalists and Dolly's Dead Ender's are making Seattle a living hell for humans and zombies; a war has begun.
| 71 | 13 | "All's Well That Ends Well" | Jason Bloom | Rob Thomas | August 1, 2019 | T27.13863 | 0.75 |
Clive, Ravi, and Liv fly back to Seattle. Clive arrives just in time at the hospital for the birth of his daughter. Peyton helps the kids to escape Blaine but is hit by bullets. Blaine turns her into a zombie to save her. After eating her first brain, she has a vision and tells Don E. that Blaine killed Darcy. The angry Don E. pushes Blaine into a well. Liv arrives and also pushes him into the well. Ravi starts producing the cure. Major injects himself with a cure syringe on camera and tells Enzo to shoot him anywhere but the head, to prove that the cure works and he is human again. Enzo does and Ravi attacks him, giving him the cure. Now human and vulnerable, Enzo is killed by Graham. It is then revealed that Major is still a zombie since his syringe contained only Max Rager. Ten years later, Clive, Ravi, and Peyton appear on a virtual talk show. Clive and Dale have adopted Michelle's son and live in San Francisco. Ravi leads the CDC, while Peyton is an attorney in Atlanta. After the show ends, Liv and Major appear as well. They are still zombies and live with their children on Zombie Island. Liv and Major offer their pseudo-immortality to their friends so they can be together again.

== Ratings ==
=== Overview ===
iZombie : U.S. viewers per episode (millions)

| Season | Episode number | | | | | | | | | | | | | | | | | | |
| Season | 1 | 2 | 3 | 4 | 5 | 6 | 7 | 8 | 9 | 10 | 11 | 12 | 13 | 14 | 15 | 16 | 17 | 18 | 19 |
|---|---|---|---|---|---|---|---|---|---|---|---|---|---|---|---|---|---|---|---|
| 1 | 2.29 | 1.99 | 1.81 | 1.77 | 1.85 | 1.80 | 1.69 | 1.62 | 1.70 | 1.50 | 1.56 | 1.80 | 1.45 | – | | | | | |
| 2 | 1.53 | 1.22 | 1.29 | 1.47 | 1.43 | 1.40 | 1.17 | 1.55 | 1.37 | 1.17 | 1.43 | 1.43 | 1.25 | 1.45 | 1.21 | 1.25 | 1.07 | 1.36 | 1.22 |
| 3 | 0.95 | 0.87 | 0.75 | 0.97 | 0.93 | 0.97 | 0.86 | 0.98 | 0.92 | 0.71 | 0.78 | 0.77 | 0.86 | – | | | | | |
| 4 | 0.99 | 0.77 | 0.76 | 0.73 | 0.72 | 0.80 | 0.81 | 0.68 | 0.68 | 0.78 | 0.72 | 0.64 | 0.74 | – | | | | | |
| 5 | 0.73 | 0.58 | 0.57 | 0.69 | 0.67 | 0.67 | 0.70 | 0.60 | 0.62 | 0.57 | 0.71 | 0.61 | 0.75 | – | | | | | |

Audience measurement performed by Nielsen Media Research

=== Season 1 ===
Viewership and ratings per episode of List of iZombie episodes
| No. | Title | Air date | Rating/share (18–49) | Viewers (millions) | DVR (18–49) | DVR viewers (millions) | Total (18–49) | Total viewers (millions) |
|---|---|---|---|---|---|---|---|---|
| 1 | "Pilot" | March 17, 2015 | 0.8/3 | 2.29 | 0.6 | —N/a | 1.4 | —N/a |
| 2 | "Brother, Can You Spare a Brain?" | March 24, 2015 | 0.7/2 | 1.99 | 0.4 | —N/a | 1.1 | —N/a |
| 3 | "The Exterminator" | March 31, 2015 | 0.7/2 | 1.81 | 0.5 | —N/a | 1.2 | —N/a |
| 4 | "Liv and Let Clive" | April 7, 2015 | 0.7/2 | 1.77 | 0.5 | —N/a | 1.2 | —N/a |
| 5 | "Flight of the Living Dead" | April 14, 2015 | 0.8/2 | 1.85 | —N/a | —N/a | —N/a | —N/a |
| 6 | "Virtual Reality Bites" | April 21, 2015 | 0.6/2 | 1.80 | 0.4 | —N/a | 1.0 | —N/a |
| 7 | "Maternity Liv" | April 28, 2015 | 0.7/2 | 1.69 | —N/a | —N/a | —N/a | —N/a |
| 8 | "Dead Air" | May 5, 2015 | 0.6/2 | 1.62 | 0.5 | —N/a | 1.1 | —N/a |
| 9 | "Patriot Brains" | May 12, 2015 | 0.6/2 | 1.70 | —N/a | —N/a | —N/a | —N/a |
| 10 | "Mr. Berserk" | May 19, 2015 | 0.6/2 | 1.50 | 0.4 | 0.96 | 1.0 | 2.46 |
| 11 | "Astroburger" | May 26, 2015 | 0.6/3 | 1.56 | 0.4 | 0.77 | 1.0 | 2.33 |
| 12 | "Dead Rat, Live Rat, Brown Rat, White Rat" | June 2, 2015 | 0.6/2 | 1.80 | 0.3 | 0.77 | 0.9 | 2.57 |
| 13 | "Blaine's World" | June 9, 2015 | 0.5/2 | 1.45 | 0.4 | 0.76 | 0.9 | 2.21 |

=== Season 2 ===
Viewership and ratings per episode of List of iZombie episodes
| No. | Title | Air date | Rating/share (18–49) | Viewers (millions) | DVR (18–49) | DVR viewers (millions) | Total (18–49) | Total viewers (millions) |
|---|---|---|---|---|---|---|---|---|
| 1 | "Grumpy Old Liv" | October 6, 2015 | 0.7/2 | 1.53 | —N/a | 0.74 | —N/a | 2.27 |
| 2 | "Zombie Bro" | October 13, 2015 | 0.5/1 | 1.22 | —N/a | 0.62 | —N/a | 1.84 |
| 3 | "Real Dead Housewife of Seattle" | October 20, 2015 | 0.5/1 | 1.29 | —N/a | 0.69 | —N/a | 1.98 |
| 4 | "Even Cowgirls Get the Black and Blues" | October 27, 2015 | 0.6/2 | 1.47 | —N/a | 0.70 | —N/a | 2.17 |
| 5 | "Love & Basketball" | November 3, 2015 | 0.6/2 | 1.43 | —N/a | —N/a | —N/a | —N/a |
| 6 | "Max Wager" | November 10, 2015 | 0.6/2 | 1.40 | —N/a | —N/a | —N/a | —N/a |
| 7 | "Abra Cadaver" | November 17, 2015 | 0.5/2 | 1.17 | 0.4 | 0.72 | 0.9 | 1.89 |
| 8 | "The Hurt Stalker" | December 1, 2015 | 0.6/2 | 1.55 | —N/a | 0.62 | —N/a | 2.17 |
| 9 | "Cape Town" | December 8, 2015 | 0.5/2 | 1.37 | 0.3 | 0.68 | 0.8 | 2.05 |
| 10 | "Method Head" | January 12, 2016 | 0.5/1 | 1.17 | 0.3 | 0.70 | 0.8 | 1.87 |
| 11 | "Fifty Shades of Grey Matter" | February 2, 2016 | 0.5/2 | 1.43 | —N/a | 0.69 | —N/a | 2.12 |
| 12 | "Physician, Heal Thy Selfie" | February 9, 2016 | 0.5/2 | 1.43 | 0.4 | —N/a | 0.9 | —N/a |
| 13 | "The Whopper" | February 16, 2016 | 0.5/2 | 1.25 | —N/a | 0.67 | —N/a | 1.92 |
| 14 | "Eternal Sunshine of the Caffeinated Mind" | February 23, 2016 | 0.6/2 | 1.45 | —N/a | 0.74 | —N/a | 2.19 |
| 15 | "He Blinded Me... with Science" | March 22, 2016 | 0.5/2 | 1.21 | —N/a | 0.64 | —N/a | 1.85 |
| 16 | "Pour Some Sugar, Zombie" | March 29, 2016 | 0.5/2 | 1.25 | —N/a | 0.62 | —N/a | 1.87 |
| 17 | "Reflections of the Way Liv Used to Be" | April 5, 2016 | 0.4/2 | 1.07 | 0.3 | 0.68 | 0.7 | 1.75 |
| 18 | "Dead Beat" | April 12, 2016 | 0.5/2 | 1.36 | —N/a | —N/a | —N/a | —N/a |
| 19 | "Salivation Army" | April 12, 2016 | 0.5/2 | 1.22 | 0.3 | 0.64 | 0.8 | 1.86 |

=== Season 3 ===
Viewership and ratings per episode of List of iZombie episodes
| No. | Title | Air date | Rating/share (18–49) | Viewers (millions) | DVR (18–49) | DVR viewers (millions) | Total (18–49) | Total viewers (millions) |
|---|---|---|---|---|---|---|---|---|
| 1 | "Heaven Just Got a Little Bit Smoother" | April 4, 2017 | 0.4/1 | 0.95 | 0.3 | 0.70 | 0.7 | 1.65 |
| 2 | "Zombie Knows Best" | April 11, 2017 | 0.3/1 | 0.87 | 0.4 | 0.69 | 0.7 | 1.56 |
| 3 | "Eat, Pray, Liv" | April 18, 2017 | 0.3/1 | 0.75 | 0.3 | 0.65 | 0.6 | 1.40 |
| 4 | "Wag the Tongue Slowly" | April 25, 2017 | 0.3/1 | 0.97 | —N/a | —N/a | —N/a | —N/a |
| 5 | "Spanking the Zombie" | May 2, 2017 | 0.3/1 | 0.93 | 0.3 | 0.60 | 0.6 | 1.53 |
| 6 | "Some Like It Hot Mess" | May 9, 2017 | 0.3/1 | 0.97 | 0.4 | 0.61 | 0.7 | 1.58 |
| 7 | "Dirt Nap Time" | May 16, 2017 | 0.3/1 | 0.86 | 0.3 | 0.59 | 0.6 | 1.45 |
| 8 | "Eat a Knievel" | May 23, 2017 | 0.3/1 | 0.98 | 0.4 | 0.72 | 0.7 | 1.70 |
| 9 | "Twenty Sided, Die" | May 30, 2017 | 0.3/1 | 0.92 | 0.3 | 0.69 | 0.6 | 1.61 |
| 10 | "Return of the Dead Guy" | June 6, 2017 | 0.2/1 | 0.71 | 0.3 | 0.65 | 0.5 | 1.36 |
| 11 | "Conspiracy Weary" | June 13, 2017 | 0.3/1 | 0.78 | 0.3 | 0.65 | 0.6 | 1.43 |
| 12 | "Looking for Mr. Goodbrain, Part 1" | June 20, 2017 | 0.3/1 | 0.77 | 0.3 | 0.70 | 0.6 | 1.47 |
| 13 | "Looking for Mr. Goodbrain, Part 2" | June 27, 2017 | 0.3/1 | 0.86 | —N/a | —N/a | —N/a | —N/a |

=== Season 4 ===
Viewership and ratings per episode of List of iZombie episodes
| No. | Title | Air date | Rating/share (18–49) | Viewers (millions) | DVR (18–49) | DVR viewers (millions) | Total (18–49) | Total viewers (millions) |
|---|---|---|---|---|---|---|---|---|
| 1 | "Are You Ready for Some Zombies?" | February 26, 2018 | 0.3/1 | 0.99 | 0.3 | 0.67 | 0.6 | 1.66 |
| 2 | "Blue Bloody" | March 5, 2018 | 0.2/1 | 0.77 | 0.3 | 0.63 | 0.5 | 1.40 |
| 3 | "Brainless in Seattle, Part 1" | March 12, 2018 | 0.3/1 | 0.76 | —N/a | 0.60 | —N/a | 1.36 |
| 4 | "Brainless in Seattle, Part 2" | March 19, 2018 | 0.2/1 | 0.73 | 0.3 | 0.57 | 0.5 | 1.30 |
| 5 | "Goon Struck" | March 26, 2018 | 0.2/1 | 0.71 | 0.2 | 0.51 | 0.4 | 1.22 |
| 6 | "My Really Fair Lady" | April 9, 2018 | 0.2/1 | 0.80 | 0.3 | 0.58 | 0.5 | 1.38 |
| 7 | "Don't Hate the Player, Hate the Brain" | April 16, 2018 | 0.3/1 | 0.81 | —N/a | 0.55 | —N/a | 1.36 |
| 8 | "Chivalry Is Dead" | April 23, 2018 | 0.2/1 | 0.68 | 0.3 | 0.57 | 0.5 | 1.25 |
| 9 | "Mac-Liv-Moore" | April 30, 2018 | 0.2/1 | 0.68 | 0.3 | 0.56 | 0.5 | 1.24 |
| 10 | "Yipee Ki Brain, Motherscratcher!" | May 7, 2018 | 0.3/1 | 0.78 | 0.2 | 0.51 | 0.5 | 1.29 |
| 11 | "Insane in the Germ Brain" | May 14, 2018 | 0.3/1 | 0.72 | 0.2 | 0.52 | 0.5 | 1.24 |
| 12 | "You've Got to Hide Your Liv Away" | May 21, 2018 | 0.2/1 | 0.64 | 0.3 | 0.54 | 0.5 | 1.18 |
| 13 | "And He Shall Be a Good Man" | May 28, 2018 | 0.2/1 | 0.74 | 0.3 | 0.54 | 0.5 | 1.28 |

=== Season 5 ===
Viewership and ratings per episode of List of iZombie episodes
| No. | Title | Air date | Rating/share (18–49) | Viewers (millions) | DVR (18–49) | DVR viewers (millions) | Total (18–49) | Total viewers (millions) |
|---|---|---|---|---|---|---|---|---|
| 1 | "Thug Death" | May 2, 2019 | 0.2/1 | 0.73 | 0.2 | 0.43 | 0.4 | 1.16 |
| 2 | "Dead Lift" | May 9, 2019 | 0.2/1 | 0.58 | 0.1 | 0.38 | 0.3 | 0.96 |
| 3 | "Five, Six, Seven, Ate!" | May 16, 2019 | 0.2/1 | 0.57 | 0.1 | 0.35 | 0.3 | 0.92 |
| 4 | "dot zom" | May 23, 2019 | 0.2/1 | 0.69 | 0.2 | 0.34 | 0.4 | 1.03 |
| 5 | "Death Moves Pretty Fast" | May 30, 2019 | 0.2/1 | 0.67 | 0.2 | 0.36 | 0.4 | 1.03 |
| 6 | "The Scratchmaker" | June 6, 2019 | 0.2/1 | 0.67 | 0.2 | 0.34 | 0.4 | 1.01 |
| 7 | "Filleted to Rest" | June 13, 2019 | 0.2/1 | 0.70 | 0.2 | 0.33 | 0.4 | 1.03 |
| 8 | "Death of a Car Salesman" | June 20, 2019 | 0.2/1 | 0.60 | 0.1 | 0.29 | 0.3 | 0.89 |
| 9 | "The Fresh Princess" | June 27, 2019 | 0.2/2 | 0.62 | 0.1 | 0.32 | 0.3 | 0.94 |
| 10 | "Night and the Zombie City" | July 11, 2019 | 0.2/1 | 0.57 | 0.1 | 0.30 | 0.3 | 0.87 |
| 11 | "Killer Queen" | July 18, 2019 | 0.2/1 | 0.71 | 0.2 | 0.34 | 0.4 | 1.05 |
| 12 | "Bye, Zombies" | July 25, 2019 | 0.2/1 | 0.61 | 0.2 | 0.34 | 0.4 | 0.95 |
| 13 | "All's Well That Ends Well" | August 1, 2019 | 0.2/1 | 0.75 | 0.1 | 0.29 | 0.3 | 1.04 |
