= Maternity Liv =

- iZombie episode
- Episode no.: Season 1 Episode 7
- Directed by: Patrick Norris
- Written by: Bob Dearden
- Production code: 3J5507
- Original air date: April 28, 2015

Guest appearances
- Bradley James as Lowell Tracy; Molly Hagan as Eva Moore; Hiro Kanagawa as Lieutenant Suzuki

Episode chronology
← Previous "Virtual Reality Bites"	Next → "Dead Air"

"Maternity Liv" is the seventh episode of the first season of the American television series iZombie. The series stars Rose McIver and revolves around medical examiner Olivia Moore, who was turned into a zombie and must eat brains to sustain herself and solve crimes. The episode was written by Bob Dearden and directed by Patrick Norris. The episode aired on The CW on April 28, 2015.

"Maternity Liv" sees Olivia consume the brain of a mother and take on maternal instincts and places an emphasis on the importance of family. The episode was met with mixed reception from critics though the humor elements were praised.

== Plot ==
A group of teenagers hanging out one evening find themselves startled when they spot a disheveled young pregnant woman staggering towards them, her voice trembling as she begs for assistance. Their initial shock turns into horror as they realize she's in distress. Despite their efforts to help, tragically, the woman doesn't survive, leaving behind her newborn baby. In the wake of the woman's death, Olivia Moore (Rose McIver) and Clive Babineaux (Malcolm Goodwin), two detectives, delve into the mystery surrounding her murder. As they interview potential suspects and gather evidence, Liv finds herself profoundly affected by the case. After consuming the brain of one of the victims, she experiences an unexpected surge of maternal instinct, which both complicates and fuels her determination to solve the crime.

Meanwhile, Major Lilywhite (Robert Buckley), another key player in the investigation, finds himself embroiled in his own set of challenges. As he diligently pursues leads in a separate missing persons case, his actions inadvertently strain his relationship with Clive, creating tension within their investigative team. Despite his best intentions, Major's efforts at detective work take a perilous turn when he becomes entangled in a situation that results in his arrest, further complicating the already convoluted case.

== Production ==
"Maternity Liv" was written by Bob Dearden and directed by Patrick Norris. The episode further expands on the mythos of the zombies. The episode fills in various in universe plot holes including the lack of a security system in the morgue. The episode features themes of motherhood and family.

=== Casting ===
Rose McIver, Malcolm Goodwin, Robert Buckley, Rahul Kohli and David Anders as Olivia Moore, Clive Babineaux, Major Lilywhite, Ravi Chakrabarti, and Blake DeBeers respectively. Bradley James guest stars as Lowell Tracy. Molly Hagan and Hiro Kanagawa also make guest star appearances as Eva Moore and Lieutenant Suzuki.

== Release ==
=== Broadcast ===
"Maternity Liv" aired on The CW on April 28, 2015. The episode is the mid-season premiere for the first season. According to Nielsen Media Research, the episode aired to an estimated 1.69 million viewers with a 0.7/2 share among adults 18-49. The episode was down around ten thousand viewers from the previous episode, "Virtual Reality Bites". Though it had around five thousand more viewers than the following episode, "Dead Air".

=== Critical reception ===
"Maternity Liv" was met with mixed reception from critics. Writing for Den of Geek, Kayti Burt rated the episode three out of five stars, praising the episode feeling that it properly explored the character of Liv Moore. Burt praised the episodes decision to follow a sillier plot. The A.V. Club's Noel Murray rated the episode a B.

Writing for Entertainment Weekly, Jeff Jensen described the episode as rushed but "filled with good ideas". He praised the episodes mystery plot. Jensen felt that the episodes humor was disappointing but still okay. Writing for the Los Angeles Times T.L. Stanley praised the episodes for its blend of comedy and humor. Particularly praising the joke of comparing Liv to the character Betelgeuse. Sam Maggs of The Mary Sue also praised the joke. Maggs praised the themes of motherhood in the episode.

In a review for IGN, Amy Ratcliff rated the episode a 8.6/10. She praised the development that Buckley's character Major underwent, expressing excitement on his future. Ratcliff praised the episode taking time to fill in plot holes. She also made note of the chemistry between McIver and James.
