= Viva Las Nowhere =

- Directed by: Jason Bloom
- Written by: Richard Uhlig; Steve Seitz
- Produced by: Josh Miller; Demitri Samaha; Tracee Stanley
- Starring: Daniel Stern; Patricia Richardson; James Caan
- Cinematography: James Glennon
- Edited by: Luis Colina
- Music by: Andrew Gross
- Production companies: Franchise Pictures; Mind's Eye Entertainment; Samaha Productions
- Distributed by: Viva Las Nowhere Productions
- Release date: June 15, 2001 (Seattle)
- Running time: 97 minutes
- Countries: United States; Canada
- Language: English

Viva Las Nowhere is a 2001 American Canadian crime comedy-drama film directed by Jason Bloom and starring Daniel Stern, Patricia Richardson and James Caan.

== Cast ==
- Daniel Stern as Frank Jacobs
- James Caan as Roy Baker
- Patricia Richardson as Helen / Wanda
- Lacey Kohl as Julie Mitchell
- Sherry Stringfield as Marguerite
- Larry Reese as Merle
- Andy Maton as Ed Babbit
- Shaun Johnston as Sheriff
- Tim Abell as Merle
- Daren Christofferson as Trooper #1
- Skerivet Daramola as Surveyor
- Taylor Pardell as Shawna Babbit
- Carrie Schiffler as Gracie
- Don Bland as Trooper #2
- Freddie Childress as Tattooed Prisoner
- Dan Duguay as Talent Show Performer
