= Green Thumb (novel) =

1999 novel by Rob Thomas

- First edition
- Author: Rob Thomas
- Language: English
- Genre: Young adult novel
- Publisher: Simon & Schuster
- Publication date: 1999
- Publication place: United States
- Media type: Print (Paperback)
- Pages: 186
- ISBN: 0-689-82886-1
- OCLC: 45384280

Green Thumb is a young-adult novel by Rob Thomas, creator of the television series Veronica Mars. It was published in 1999

== Plot summary ==
Pudgy, misanthropic boy genius Grady Jacobs wins a scholarship to participate in rainforest research and conservation. Upon discovering that Grady is only thirteen, Dr. Carter, the scientist in charge, relegates him to the position of camp drudge. A healthier diet and menial labor transform Grady both physically and emotionally, making him a better and more balanced boy.

During the course of his duties, Grady somehow discovers a way to communicate with trees. This fantastic power eventually comes in handy when it is revealed that Dr. Carter's project would, in fact, lead to the destruction of the rainforest.

== Reception ==
Critical reception has been positive. Both Publishers Weekly and Kirkus Reviews gave Green Thumb favorable reviews, with Publishers Weekly writing, "While this book is aimed at a slightly younger audience than Thomas's previous YA titles, Grady's knowing, flip tone will appeal to Thomas's older teen fans."
