= Overnight Delivery =

1998 film by Jason Bloom

- VHS cover
- Directed by: Jason Bloom
- Written by: Marc Sedaka; Steven Bloom
- Produced by: Brad Krevoy; Steven Stabler; Dan Etheridge
- Starring: Paul Rudd; Reese Witherspoon
- Cinematography: Edward J. Pei
- Edited by: Luis Colina
- Music by: Andrew Gross
- Distributed by: New Line Home Video
- Release date: April 7, 1998
- Running time: 87 minutes
- Language: English
- Budget: $10 million

Overnight Delivery is a 1998 American romantic comedy film directed by Jason Bloom. It stars Paul Rudd and Reese Witherspoon as a college student and a stripper who take a road trip across America to retrieve a package that had been impulsively sent to a girlfriend. It was filmed on location in Minnesota in 1996. It was released direct-to-video by New Line Home Video on April 7, 1998.

== Plot ==
Wyatt Trips is a student at Twin Cities College, Minneapolis, Minnesota. He is in a long-distance relationship with his high school girlfriend, Kimberly Jasney, who is currently a student at the University of Memphis. Wyatt loves Kim, even though they have never consummated their love.

One day when Wyatt calls Kim, her roommate's reply leads him to believe that Kim is cheating on him with some guy named "The Ricker". Heartbroken, he goes to a strip club, gets drunk, and becomes acquainted with one of the club's dancers, Ivy Miller. She suggests to Wyatt to break up with Kim by sending her a scathing letter and a topless picture of himself with Ivy. Wyatt complies by sending the package through Global Express, an overnight delivery service.

The next morning, Kim calls Wyatt claiming "The Ricker" is a dog that she had to dogsit. Regretting his actions, he realizes he has 24 hours to retrieve the package before it gets to her. Wyatt and Ivy go to the Global Express office where, by chance, they encounter a spiteful classmate of Wyatt's who refuses to help them. Wyatt tries to talk Hal Ipswich, the deliveryman, into giving him the package, but he thinks Wyatt is a spy for the company and refuses to break the rules.

Wyatt buys an air ticket to Memphis, but his co-passenger turns out to be a serial killer, John Dwayne Beezly, who takes him hostage. Wyatt escapes and runs into Ivy on the road. Fearing that if he went back to the airport, the FBI would question him and he would not make it to Memphis in time, he begs Ivy to drive him all the way. They happen upon the Global Express delivery truck at a gas station. Wyatt breaks into the truck and locates the package, but the vehicle unexpectedly drives off. Ivy gives chase but despite their efforts they fail to retrieve the package.

At their next stop, Des Moines, Iowa, airport officials do not allow Wyatt to board the connecting flight. So, they decide to travel to St. Louis, Missouri to board another connecting flight. En route to St. Louis, they have an argument leading to an accident which ends up with their vehicle falling into the river. They have dinner in a cowboy diner and then try to run out on the check, but get arrested. After posting bail, they are let off and once again happen upon the delivery truck outside a diner. While Hal is having dinner, Wyatt decides to empty the truck's gas tank in order to stall him, but a carelessly flung cigarette butt sets fire to the gas and causes the truck to explode. But even that doesn't stop the deliveryman (who is clearly over the edge by now) and he drives off. Wyatt and Ivy then steal a drunk's car and drive to Kim's campus.

After saying goodbye to Ivy, Wyatt gives chase to Hal and stops him in time. However, after meeting Kim, Wyatt suddenly realizes that he loves Ivy, not Kim. After breaking up with her, he runs into another guy wearing the same kind of locket that Kim gave him long ago. Wyatt correctly surmises that the guy is none other than "The Ricker" and Kim was cheating on him after all. He allows Hal to deliver the package and confesses his love to Ivy, who kisses him passionately.

== Cast ==
- Paul Rudd as Wyatt Trips
- Reese Witherspoon as Ivy Miller
- Christine Taylor as Kimberly Jasney
- Larry Drake as Hal Ipswich, the deliveryman
- Sarah Silverman as Turran
- Stephen Yoakam as the SWAT Leader
- Tobin Bell as John Dwayne Beezly
- Buffy Sedlackek as the teacher
- Richard Cody as the rancher
- Tim Mcniff as the TV anchor
- Christie Ellis as Didi
- Alex DelPriore as George
- Nathan Frenzel as the singing waiter
- Matt Klemp as "The Ricker"
- Maria Manthei as an extra
- Marcus Anderson as an extra
- Sarah Miller as the double when Ivy Miller and Wyatt Trips make out

== Production ==
In November 1993, Joe Roth's Caravan Pictures bought the spec script by Marc Sedaka for $125,000 against $300,000 beating out a bid by 20th Century Fox.

The film was written by Marc Sedaka and Steven Bloom. Kevin Smith worked on an early draft of the script, in what he called an uncredited rewrite. The film was directed by Jason Bloom; this was his second film, his first being Bio-Dome. The producers include Roger Birbaum and Bradley Tenkel, and the production companies are the MPCA and Caravan Pictures. The film cost $10 million to produce and an extra $10 million was spent on advertising. The film lasts approximately 87 minutes.

Joey Lauren Adams was considered for the part of Ivy, and was going to skip out on her role in Chasing Amy, but she lost the part to Reese Witherspoon.

The entire film was shot in the Twin Cities of Minnesota. Exterior scenes were filmed in Minneapolis, Saint Paul and rural Minnesota. The film included landmarks such as Ground Zero nightclub, used as the strip club, Minneapolis Convention Center as the airport, the Stillwater Lift Bridge, and University of St. Thomas as The University of Memphis. The Embassy Suites Bloomington West was used as The University of Memphis dormitory.

== Reception ==
On Rotten Tomatoes the film has an approval rating of 43%, based on reviews from 7 critics, with an average of 4.90 out of 10.

Neal Justin, from the Star Tribune, gave a negative view of the film. "In what should have been a good film produced in Minnesota," Neal says, "Overnight Delivery gets lost in an unworthy script." He states that all the right elements were present and puts [the] blame on bad writing and inexperienced production. When talking about the potentially rising stars at the time, Rudd and Witherspoon, he says, "Unfortunately, they're not yet strong enough in Overnight Delivery (two stars out of five stars) to overcome predictable unimaginative writing." Entertainment Weekly was positive about the actor's performances but criticized the script, saying "their comedic charm is subverted by a script that too often aims for cheap laughs" and gave it a grade C−. Nathan Rabin of The A.V. Club wrote that while the two lead actors had done good work elsewhere they were "atrocious" in this film, "He's irritatingly smarmy, she's abrasively sassy, and together they're insufferable." Rabin concluded, "This should be avoided by all".

Rebecca Murray, writing for About.com, disagreed and gave Overnight Delivery a more positive review. She stated that the movie did not receive the attention it deserved by going straight to video, and it should have been given a better shot. "I actually laughed out loud at parts of Overnight Delivery and wish it had been given a better shot at [the] theatrical run."
