= Snoops (1999 TV series) =

- Principal cast of Snoops
- Genre: Comedy drama
- Created by: David E. Kelley
- Starring: Gina Gershon; Paula Marshall; Danny Nucci; Paula Jai Parker; Edward Kerr; Jessalyn Gilsig
- Opening theme: "One Way or Another" by Blondie
- Composers: Lisa Coleman; Wendy Melvoin
- Country of origin: United States
- Original language: English
- No. of seasons: 1
- No. of episodes: 13 (3 unaired)

Production
- Executive producers: David E. Kelley; John Tinker
- Producers: Allan Arkush; Neil Mandelberg; Jack Philbrick; Kim Newton
- Production locations: Los Angeles, California; Manhattan Beach, California
- Camera setup: Single-camera
- Running time: 45–48 minutes
- Production companies: David E. Kelley Productions; 20th Century Fox Television

Original release
- Network: ABC
- Release: September 26 – December 19, 1999

Snoops is an American comedy-drama television series that aired on ABC from September 26 to December 19, 1999. Created by David E. Kelley, the show came about during the height of Kelley's fame, with both The Practice and Ally McBeal sustaining large audiences. Although the series garnered good ratings initially by averaging 11.5 million viewers, tying NBC in the ratings, it soon faltered and was cancelled quickly. Only ten of the thirteen episodes produced aired in the United States, while the final three episodes aired overseas. The final episode, which was rewritten by Kelley after the cancellation announcement, served as a series finale.

== Synopsis ==
Snoops focuses on a less-than-conventional detective agency, Glenn Hall, Inc., headed by Glenn Hall (Gina Gershon). Her staff included Roberta Young (Paula Jai Parker), a detective who goes to great lengths to get the job done; Manny Lott (Danny Nucci), the resident technology wiz; and Dana Plant (Paula Marshall), a former Santa Monica police detective.

== Cast ==
=== Main ===
- Gina Gershon as Glenn Hall
- Paula Marshall as Dana Plant (Episodes 1–11)
- Danny Nucci as Manny Lott
- Paula Jai Parker as Roberta Young
- Edward Kerr as Detective Greg McCormack
- Jessalyn Gilsig as Suzanne Shivers (Episodes 12–13)

=== Guest stars ===
- John Glover as Gary Hyndman
- Stephen Tobolowsky as Michael Bench
- Priscilla Barnes as Herself
- Casey Biggs as Gary Marlowe
- D. B. Woodside as Avery
- Emmy Rossum as Caroline Beels
- Denise Crosby as Evelyn Houtch
- David E. Kelley as Himself (cameo appearance)

== Connections to other David E. Kelley series ==
After the series was canceled, the character of Glenn Hall appeared in an episode of the final season of The Practice titled "The Firm". Kelley later cast Jessalyn Gilsig on his Fox series Boston Public, and also cast Snoops guest star Emmy Rossum in a multi-episode arc of The Practice.

== Episodes ==
No.	Title	Directed by	Written by	Original release date	Prod. code
1	"Pilot"	Allan Arkush	David E. Kelley	September 26, 1999	1S00
Former cop Dana Plant unwittingly finds herself with a job at Glenn Hall Inc., where civil rights and the constitution come second to solving crimes, but finds herself still having to deal with former cop partner Greg McCormack.
2	"Singer in the Band"	Allan Arkush	David E. Kelley	October 3, 1999	1S01
Roberta gets personally involved in a case against a deadbeat dad, while Glenn goes undercover as a country music singer.
3	"Bedfellas"	Dennie Gordon	Everett Owens & David E. Kelley	October 10, 1999	1S02
While Manny attempts to outwit a con artist, Glenn gets in deep when she discovers her new boyfriend has mafia connections.
4	"Higher Calling"	Arvin Brown	Paul Guyot	October 17, 1999	1S04
Glenn and Dana go undercover as prostitutes to prevent a political scandal, while Manny helps a priest who is being blackmailed. Priscilla Barnes and David Dukes guest star. Cameo appearances by Bill Maher, Arianna Huffington and Jane Krakowski playing themselves in a scene incorporating a clip of the issue-based talk show Politically Incorrect.
5	"The Heartless Bitch"	Allan Arkush	Nat Bernstein & Mitchel Katlin	October 24, 1999	1S06
Manny and Roberta investigate what seems to be a simple case of infidelity, while Glenn and Dana search for the recipient of a widower's wife's heart.
6	"Separation Anxiety"	Michael Lange	Kim Newton	October 31, 1999	1S05
While Dana fears for her life when she gets a stalker, Glenn helps a 14-year-old girl named Caroline Beels find her biological mother.
7	"Constitution"	Bethany Rooney	Story by : Alfonso H. Moreno & Molly Newman; Teleplay by : David E. Kelley	November 21, 1999	1S07
The agency gets involved in the complicated life of a family which may include murderers and gay bashers.
8	"True Believers"	Miguel Arteta	Michael Green	November 28, 1999	1S08
Back on the force, Dana is annoyed when her first case involves working with Greg and the agency to investigate a mysterious kidnapping.
9	"The Grinch"	Joe Napolitano	David E. Kelley	December 12, 1999	1S09
Glenn searches for a man stealing Christmas presents, while Manny is asked to assist a man in killing his wife.
10	"A Criminal Mind"	Ian Sander	Hart Hanson	December 19, 1999	1S03
Glenn and Dana are confused when a clue from a hypnotized man leads them to a murder victim, while Roberta and Manny join forces with a bounty hunter.
11	"Blood Lines"	Donald Petrie	Molly Newman	unaired	1S10
Glenn is reunited with Caroline, who needs a donor for leukemia treatment. Glenn follows a trail to a possible organ match, who will only participate if rape charges against him are dropped. And a tragedy unfolds as Dana tries to help a mentally disabled office worker at the police station, who is caught in a drug deal. However, events spiral out of control, ending in Dana's death.
12	"The Stolen Diskette"	Lloyd Ahern II	John Tinker	unaired	1S11
FBI Agent Suzanne Shivers joins forces with Glenn to track down a disk with important mob information on it, only to find herself intrigued by the agency. And Greg leaves the force in the wake of Dana's death.
13	"Swan Chant"	Allan Arkush	Molly Newman	unaired	1S12
Glenn and Suzanne take care of a singer who is trying to rid herself of her drug addiction. Against Glenn's will, Manny takes a case of a contested will that may involve the ownership of the agency. When the case goes wrong, a millionaire's widow takes over the agency. The series ends with Suzanne and Roberta finding jobs elsewhere, and Glenn leaving the agency to go on a music tour.

== Production ==
On December 16, 1998, David E. Kelley began production on the show, which was greenlighted by ABC. Principal photography began on August 15, 1999, in Los Angeles, California.
