= Jason Bloom (director) =

American film and television director

- Occupation(s): Film director, television director
- Years active: 1989–present

Jason Bloom (born 1968 or 1969) is an American film and television director.

His film credits include the short film Irving (1995) starring James Belushi, Bio-Dome (1996) starring Pauly Shore and Stephen Baldwin, Overnight Delivery (1998) starring Paul Rudd and Reese Witherspoon and Viva Las Nowhere (2001) starring James Caan and Daniel Stern.

In television, he has directed episodes of Soldier of Fortune, Inc., Veronica Mars and iZombie. Prior to directing, Bloom worked as a production assistant on the films Action Jackson (1988) and K-9 (1989).
