= Everett Owens =

American writer

Everett Owens is the pen name under which Rob Thomas authored three books in The X-Files young adult series. Thomas constructed the pen name from the names of his two dogs.

== The X-Files young adult series ==
- Control, ISBN 0-06-447177-2
- Howlers, ISBN 0-06-447185-3
- Regeneration, ISBN 0-613-28039-3
