= Rob Thomas (writer) =

Young adult novel author, television program writer

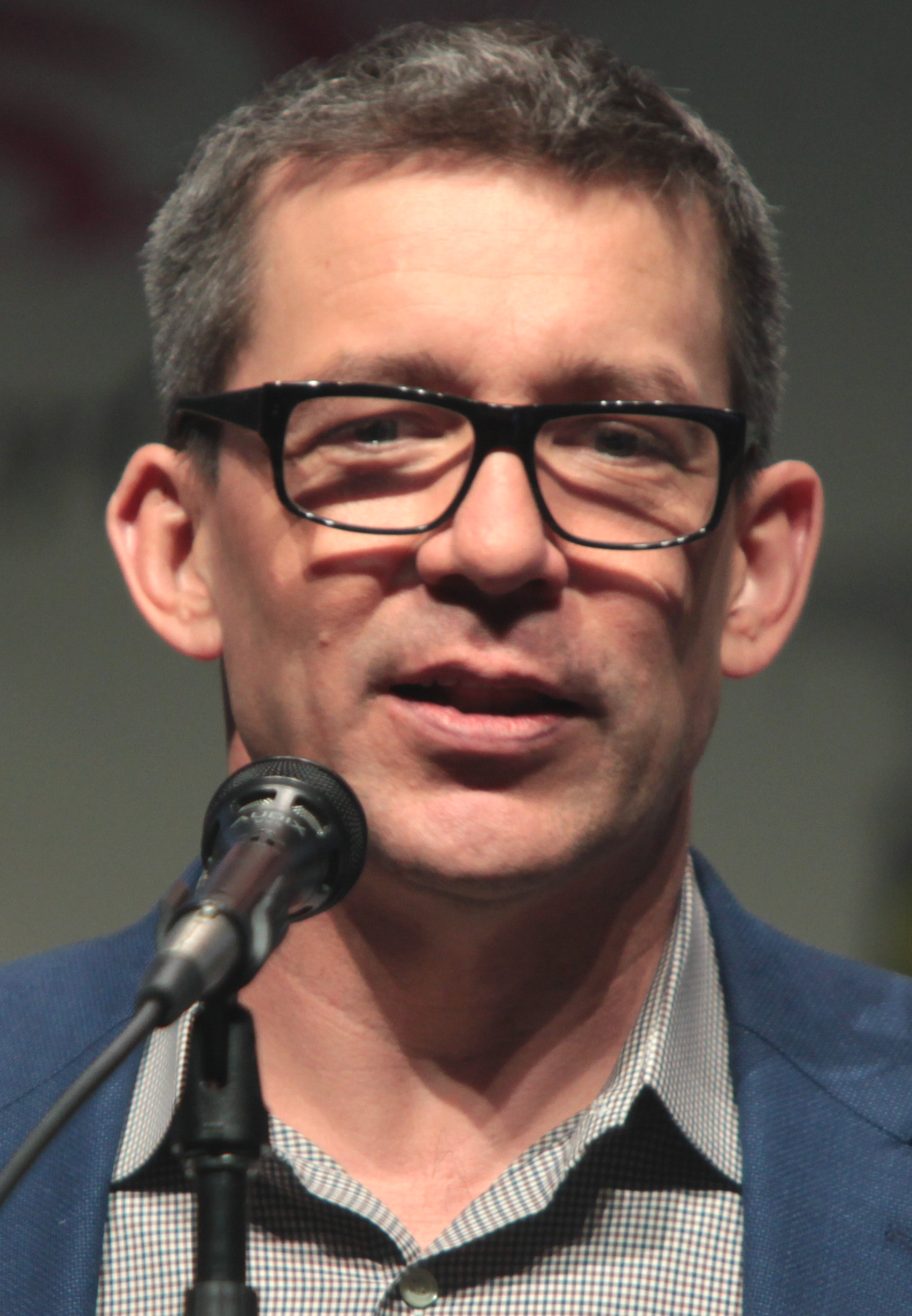
- Thomas at WonderCon in 2015
- Born: Robert James Thomas; August 15, 1965 (age 61); Sunnyside, Washington, U.S.
- Occupations: Screenwriter, director, producer, author
- Writing career
- Pen name: Everett Owens
- Period: 1996–present
- Notable works: Veronica Mars iZombie
- Website: slaverats.com

Robert James Thomas (born August 15, 1965) is an American author, producer, director and screenwriter. He created the television series Veronica Mars (2004–2007, 2019), co-developed 90210 (2008–2013), and co-created Party Down (2009–2010, 2023) and iZombie (2015–2019).

== Education and early career ==
Thomas was born in Sunnyside, Washington. He graduated from San Marcos High School in 1983 and went to Texas Christian University (TCU) on a football scholarship. Thomas played 11 games for the TCU Horned Frogs football team in 1984 as a backup tight end and special teams player. He had one interception that season, off a fake punt attempt by Kansas State. He later transferred to the University of Texas at Austin and graduated in 1987 with a BA in history from its College of Liberal Arts.

Before he began writing novels for young adults, Thomas taught high school journalism at John Marshall High School in San Antonio, Texas, and later at John H. Reagan High School in Austin, Texas. During this time he also advised the UT-Austin student magazine.

From August 1993 to June 1995, Thomas worked for Channel One News, an experience which informed his 1998 novel Satellite Down. Thomas was a member of three San Marcos, Texas bands—Public Bulletin, Hey Zeus, and Black Irish—from the mid-1980s to the early 1990s.

== Entertainment career ==
Thomas's first television writing credit came on a 1996 episode of Cartoon Network's Space Ghost Coast to Coast. He next wrote the script that would eventually become the 1999 film Fortune Cookie. Based on the script, he was offered a job on the writing staff of Dawson's Creek during the show's first season. After reading the same script, then-president of Sony Entertainment Jeff Sagansky suggested Thomas create a romantic comedy pilot. That show soon developed into Cupid, a critically acclaimed 1998 comedy-drama series canceled after 15 episodes in 1999. This led to Thomas being asked to run ABC's 1999 series Snoops, although he left due to creative differences with David E. Kelley before the show aired. After Snoops, Thomas got pilot orders for his U.S. adaptation of the British Metropolis and original script The Sticks, but neither went to series. Thomas has also adapted the screenplay for Drive Me Crazy, and directed On Air, a twenty-minute film adaptation of a story from Doing Time.

Thomas got his second show picked up in 2004 — the critically successful but again low-rated Veronica Mars, which struggled to boost its audience until it was canceled after a third season in 2007. He was offered the showrunner position on NBC's Friday Night Lights in 2006, which he declined in favor of the possibility (and eventual reality) of a fourth season of Veronica Mars. Thomas was also offered and declined CBS's Viva Laughlin in 2007; he joined ABC's Miss/Guided in May 2007 before leaving in July of the same year, again due to creative differences.

Thomas worked as a writer on ABC's short-lived primetime series Big Shots from 2007 to 2008, co-wrote and shot the comedy pilot Party Down (aired by Starz in 2009, ran for two seasons), and had three pilots ordered for the 2008–2009 television season: a remake of Cupid for ABC, that was picked up to air midseason but soon canceled; Good Behavior, a U.S. adaptation of New Zealand series Outrageous Fortune also for ABC although it never aired, and a modern spinoff of Beverly Hills, 90210 for The CW, which he departed early in favor of his other projects.

There were various reports in 2011 and 2012 that a Party Down film was in the works, to be written by John Enbom, but the film never materialized.

In June 2010, Thomas told E! Online that he was "writing a drama pilot set in the world of corporate espionage for Showtime", but the series was not picked up. In August 2010, Variety reported that NBC had ordered a pilot of a new sitcom, to be called Temp, for which Thomas, Dan Etheridge, and Enbom would be executive producers. However, in February 2011 Thomas announced on Twitter that NBC had decided against the show because they felt "it skewed 'too young.'" In January 2011, Fox ordered a half-hour single-camera pilot from Thomas, to be called Little in Common. In August 2011, Fox decided not to pick up Little in Common for the fall season, but was attempting to retool it, possibly as a midseason replacement. However, in October Fox decided not to air the show. In a wide-ranging interview with Austinist published soon afterward, Thomas discussed the situation, saying, "we really thought this one was going on the air. So it was both surprising and disappointing that it didn't."

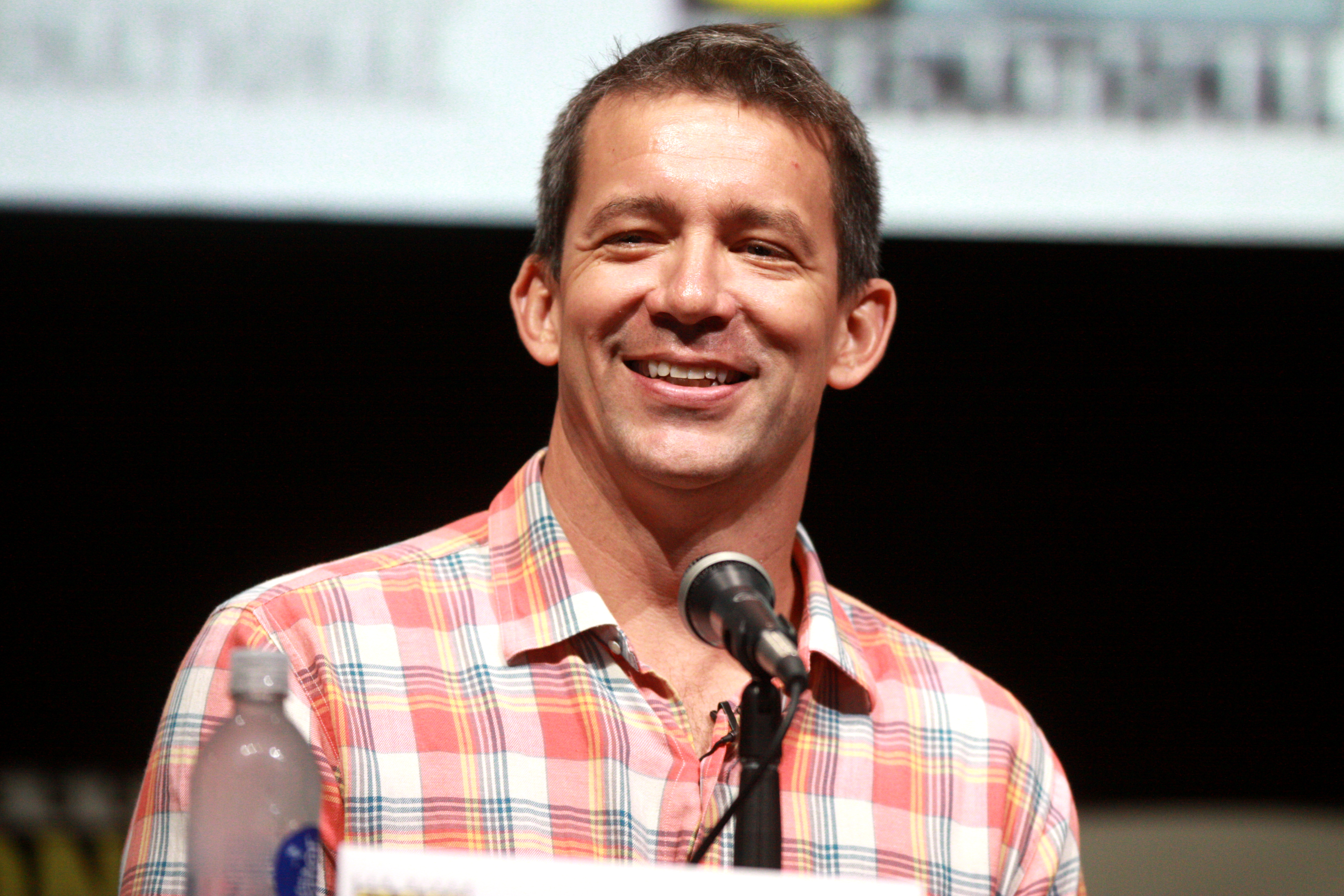
Thomas at San Diego Comic-Con in 2013

Thomas began publicly discussing a possible Veronica Mars film in 2009. He eventually got permission from Warner Brothers to make the film, with crowdsourced financing, if he were able to raise more than $2 million. On March 13, 2013, he posted a Kickstarter page for the film, and by 6 PM Pacific Time on the first day, the appeal had already raised over $2 million in pledges. The Kickstarter appeal eventually raised $5.7 million before its April 13 ending. The project set a Kickstarter record for the most backers, with 88,000 people contributing funds. The resulting film, Veronica Mars, was directed and co-written by Thomas, and released in March 2014; it received positive reviews, and earned $3.5 million. Thomas also co-wrote two Veronica Mars novels which were published by Vintage Books after the film's release; the novels depict events occurring after those of the film.

In November 2013, a pilot based on Chris Roberson and Michael Allred's comic book iZOMBIE was picked up by The CW, with Thomas producing alongside Diane Ruggiero-Wright. The thirteen-episode first season of iZombie was subsequently broadcast, commencing March 17, 2015. In 2016, he announced he was working on a TV series based on the 1987 cult classic film The Lost Boys to be broadcast on the CW. His plan was that it would last 7 seasons, each covering a decade in the life of the vampires, who would be different characters from the film.

== Works ==
=== Books ===
- Rats Saw God (1996) (ISBN 0-689-80777-5);
- Slave Day (1997) (ISBN 0-689-82193-X);
- Doing Time: Notes from the Undergrad (1997) (ISBN 0-689-82414-9);
- Satellite Down (1998) (ISBN 0-689-83052-1);
- Green Thumb (1999) (ISBN 0-689-82886-1);
- Veronica Mars: The Thousand Dollar Tan Line (2014) (ISBN 978-0804170703);
- Veronica Mars: Mr. Kiss and Tell (2015).

=== Television programs ===
- Space Ghost Coast to Coast (1996) (writer, episode "Explode");
- Dawson's Creek (1998) (writer, season one, episodes "Prelude to a Kiss" aka "Kiss" and "In the Company of Men" aka "Roadtrip");
- Cupid (1998–1999) (creator, writer, executive producer);
- Veronica Mars (2004–2007, 2019) (creator, writer, executive producer, director);
- 90210 (2008) (developer, writer);
- Party Down (2009–2010, 2023) (creator, writer, executive producer);
- Cupid (2009) (creator, writer, executive producer);
- Good Behavior (2009) (writer, executive producer) (not picked up);
- Plymouth Rock (2010) (creator, writer, executive producer) (not picked up);
- iZombie (2015–2019) (creator, writer, executive producer, director).
- High Potential (2024) (writer, executive producer)

=== Films ===
- Fortune Cookie (1999) (writer)
- Drive Me Crazy (1999) (screenwriter)
- Veronica Mars (2014) (writer, director)

== Awards and nominations ==
Thomas has been nominated for multiple Golden Satellite Awards.
