= IZombie (TV series) =

2015 American supernatural crime drama television series

iZombie
- Genre: Comedy-drama; Horror; Supernatural; Police procedural
- Based on: iZombie by: Chris Roberson; Mike Allred
- Developed by: Rob Thomas; Diane Ruggiero-Wright
- Starring: Rose McIver; Malcolm Goodwin; Rahul Kohli; Robert Buckley; David Anders; Aly Michalka; Robert Knepper; Bryce Hodgson
- Opening theme: "Stop, I'm Already Dead" by Deadboy & the Elephantmen
- Composer: Josh Kramon
- Country of origin: United States
- Original language: English
- No. of seasons: 5
- No. of episodes: 71 (list of episodes)

Production
- Executive producers: Rob Thomas; Diane Ruggiero-Wright; Dan Etheridge; Danielle Stokdyk
- Production locations: Vancouver, British Columbia
- Camera setup: Single-camera
- Running time: 42 minutes
- Production companies: Spondoolie Productions; Bonanza Productions; Vertigo; Warner Bros. Television

Original release
- Network: The CW
- Release: March 17, 2015 – August 1, 2019

iZombie is an American supernatural procedural drama television series developed by Rob Thomas and Diane Ruggiero-Wright for the CW. It is an adaptation of the DC comic book series iZombie created by Chris Roberson and Michael Allred. The series premiered on March 17, 2015, and ran for five seasons, ending on August 1, 2019. It follows the adventures of doctor-turned-zombie Olivia "Liv" Moore (Rose McIver), a medical examiner for the Seattle Police who helps solve murders after eating the victims' brains and temporarily absorbing their memories and personalities.

== Premise and synopsis ==
Seattle medical resident Olivia "Liv" Moore is turned into a zombie while attending a boat party. She abandons her career and breaks up with her fiancé, much to the disappointment and puzzlement of her family. She discovers that if she does not periodically satisfy her new appetite for brains, she will turn into a stereotypically primitive and homicidal zombie. Instead of feeding by killing innocent people, Liv decides to take a job at the King County morgue and eat the brains of the corpses she autopsies. Her secret is guessed by her boss, Dr. Ravi Chakrabarti. Ravi soon becomes Liv's friend and confidant, and as a scientist, he is intrigued by her condition.

Whenever Liv eats a dead person's brain, she temporarily absorbs some of their personality traits and skills, and she experiences flashbacks of that person's life. In the case of murder victims, the flashbacks offer clues about the killer. Liv uses this new ability to help Police Detective Clive Babineaux solve crimes. Though she initially passes herself off as a psychic, Clive eventually learns the truth about her and zombies. Meanwhile, Ravi works to develop a cure for Liv's affliction, in the hope that one day she will be able to return to her former life.

Throughout the first few seasons, the number of zombies in Seattle gradually increases, while various factions try to cover up their existence, fight them, exploit them, or protect them. At the end of the third season, a zombie-run private military company infects thousands of people in Seattle with the zombie virus and imposes martial law on the city to create a safe haven for zombies. The final two seasons deal with the struggles and conflicts of living under these conditions; Liv becomes the leader of a human smuggling operation bringing people who want to become zombies into Seattle.

== Cast and characters ==
- Rose McIver as Olivia "Liv" Moore: A former medical resident, she became a zombie when she attended a boat party that was attacked by people who had just taken a new designer drug called "Utopium" while also consuming the Max Rager energy drink. She works as a coroner's assistant for the King County Medical Examiner's Office to have access to the human brains she must frequently consume to maintain her humanity and suppress her hunger. She experiences flashes of memories from the brains she eats, temporarily takes on random quirks from her subjects, and has demonstrated the ability to take a bullet to the chest with little damage. Through her visions, Liv uses her powers to bring justice to the victims and help Seattle Police find and apprehend murderers.
- Malcolm Goodwin as Clive Babineaux: A Seattle PD detective, he is newly transferred from vice to homicide when the series starts, and who gets Liv's help to solve crimes. Liv and Ravi initially claim that she is "psychic-ish" to account for her knowledge of victims, but he eventually learns the truth about her in the second season. With her help, Clive has solved many cases in an incredibly efficient and accurate fashion, hoping one day to be promoted to captain. He is in a relationship with former federal agent-turned cop Dale Bozzio.
- Rahul Kohli as Ravi Chakrabarti: A medical examiner, Liv's friend, and Major's eventual roommate, he knows Liv's secret and assists her whenever he can to protect and study her, expressing an interest in finding a cure for her condition. He used to work for the Centers for Disease Control and Prevention, but was fired for his obsession with preparing for an attack with biological weapons.
- Robert Buckley as Major Lillywhite: Liv's ex-fiancé, she ended the relationship to prevent him from becoming "infected" by her condition. He worked as a social worker at the local teen center, Helton Shelter, in the first season. In the second season, he was blackmailed into working for Max Rager, and he works for Fillmore-Graves in the third and fourth seasons.
- David Anders as Blaine "DeBeers" McDonough: A drug dealer-turned brain-dealing zombie, he dealt a tainted version of the experimental drug, Utopium, which helped cause the zombie outbreak.
- Aly Michalka as Peyton Charles (seasons 3–5; recurring seasons 1–2): Liv's best friend and roommate, she expresses concern about Liv's declining interest in life after the boat party. She also works as an assistant district attorney for the King County Prosecuting Attorney's Office, before becoming the mayor's chief of staff at the end of the third season.
- Robert Knepper as Angus McDonough (season 4; recurring seasons 2–3): Blaine's estranged and abusive father, he turned him into a zombie, and he tried to force Blaine to work for him before becoming one of Major's Chaos Killer victims.
- Bryce Hodgson as Donald "Don E." Eberhard (season 5; recurring seasons 2–4): An associate of Blaine's, he becomes his henchman, and later business partner. Hodgson first appeared in the first season as the character's twin brother Scott E., a mental patient who believes in zombies, reprising the role in the fifth season.

== Episodes ==
iZombie was officially picked up on May 8, 2014, and premiered on March 17, 2015. On May 6, 2015, the CW renewed the series for a second season. On November 23, 2015, the CW ordered six additional episodes for the second season, bringing the episode count to a total of 19 episodes. iZombie was renewed for a third season on March 11, 2016. iZombie was renewed for a fourth season on May 10, 2017, which premiered on February 26, 2018. iZombie was renewed for a fifth and final season in May 2018, which premiered on May 2, 2019.

Season	Episodes	Originally released		Rank	Average viewers (in millions inc. DVR)
Season	Episodes	First released	Last released	Rank	Average viewers (in millions inc. DVR)
1	13	March 17, 2015	June 9, 2015	154	2.51
2	19	October 6, 2015	April 12, 2016	174	1.68
3	13	April 4, 2017	June 27, 2017	160	1.37
4	13	February 26, 2018	May 28, 2018	191	1.24
5	13	May 2, 2019	August 1, 2019	140	1.01

== Production ==
=== Development ===
Rob Thomas was approached by Warner Bros. to develop the series while he was editing the film version of Veronica Mars. At first, he refused, but Warner Bros. was insistent, and he eventually took the job. Prior to iZombie, Thomas was attempting to pitch his own zombie television series; when AMC picked up The Walking Dead, it was "so similar to what we were doing, it just killed that project", according to Thomas.

The opening credits for the series are drawn by Michael Allred, the main artist and co-creator of the original comic book. The series' theme tune is "Stop, I'm Already Dead" by Deadboy & the Elephantmen.

On October 5, 2015, the CW ordered five additional scripts for the second season, but on November 23, 2015, the network ordered six additional episodes into production, bringing the season's order to 19 episodes.

=== Casting ===
Alexandra Krosney originally played the part of Peyton Charles. After the series was ordered, she was replaced by Aly Michalka, and the role was changed from regular cast to recurring. On May 22, 2016, Michalka was promoted to series regular for the third season. Nora Dunn was initially attached to play Liv's mother, but the casting was changed when her character was realized as playing a smaller role than initially envisioned. She was replaced by Molly Hagan. Rob Thomas has stated that this move was a financial decision.

On July 21, 2017, Robert Knepper was announced as being promoted to series regular for the fourth season. On September 27, 2018, it was announced that Bryce Hodgson had been promoted to series regular for the fifth and final season. David Anders stated following Knepper's departure that while he had suggested Rutger Hauer to play his character's father, he believed Knepper did well in the role.

==== Allegations against Knepper and exit ====
Late in 2017, in the wake of sexual assault allegations against Robert Knepper, the CW conducted an internal inquiry. Finding no evidence of misconduct transpiring on the set, he was announced to be remaining on the series. McIver and Kohli released statements following the decision, with McIver stating she supported and admired the bravery of women coming forward in general; Kohli said he did not feel comfortable giving his full thoughts at the time.

Knepper personally announced his promotion in a video released at Comic-Con but did not partake in promotional interviews for his role following the allegations, nor did he attend the fourth-season wrap party.

On January 12, 2018, the studio said it had conducted a second investigation. CW president Mark Pedowitz stated, "Again, the investigation related to the set and his behavior on the set. They found no wrongdoing on the set." Pedowitz elaborated that Knepper had signed on for a single season and that his exit from the series had already been planned.

== Reception ==
=== Critical response ===
The first season received generally positive reviews. Review aggregation website Rotten Tomatoes gave the series a 92% approval rating, with an average rating of 7.65/10, based on 52 reviews. The site's critical consensus states: "An amusing variation on the zombie trend, iZombie is refreshingly different, if perhaps too youth-oriented to resonate with adult audiences." Metacritic, which uses a weighted average, assigned a score of 74 out of 100, based on reviews from 38 critics, indicating "generally favorable reviews".

Amy Ratcliffe of IGN rated the pilot episode 8.4/10, praising the series' "casual take on zombies" and Rose McIver's performance as Liv. LaToya Ferguson of The Onion's The A.V. Club graded the series an A− and stated the series is better for diverging from its comic-book origins. She praised the series for having the same quick-witted banter as Veronica Mars, and observed it measures up well against Pushing Daisies, noting: "Television can only be better for having the voices of Thomas and Ruggiero-Wright back on a weekly basis". Inkoo Kang of the Dallas Observer called the series, "dazzlingly, tirelessly witty" with an "acute attention to human relationships", and praised it as "the summer's most underrated series".

The second season was also met with positive reviews. It holds a 100% approval rating on Rotten Tomatoes, based on 14 reviews with an average score of 8.39/10. The website's consensus states: "iZombie smoothly shifts gears in its second season, moving between comedy and dramatic procedural, while skillfully satirizing modern society along the way."

The third season received further praise with a score of 100% on Rotten Tomatoes, based on 10 reviews with an average rating of 8.56/10. The website's consensus reads, "Broodier and brainier, iZombie's third season may be its best yet".

The fourth season has been met with similar praise. It earned a score of 92% on Rotten Tomatoes, based on 12 reviews, with an average rating of 8.13/10. The website's consensus reads, "iZombie's fourth season boldly flips the board on the series narrative, injecting fresh blood into its amiable corpse and promising that it won't go stiff anytime soon".

On Rotten Tomatoes, season five has an approval rating of 71% based on reviews from seven critics. The series finale was met with notable negative response, however. In March 2022, nearly three years after its airing, Paste reflected that both the finale and final season as a whole seemed to have suffered due to Rob Thomas' preoccupation with the concurrent revival of Veronica Mars, and stated, "The finale of iZombie was one of the worst TV-viewing experiences I have ever had. As the minutes unfolded, I became filled with horror watching everything fall apart. The characters I had loved for five seasons turned into strangers. And when the credits finally rolled, I found myself questioning all the love I had put into it." The same month, Rahul Kohli admitted dissatisfaction with the finale, saying that he felt that it "sucked" and was "super disappointing".

=== Ratings ===
Viewership and ratings per season of iZombie
Season	Timeslot (ET)	Episodes	First aired		Last aired		TV season	Viewership rank	Avg. viewers (millions)	18–49 rank	Avg. 18–49 rating
Season	Timeslot (ET)	Episodes	Date	Viewers (millions)	Date	Viewers (millions)	TV season	Viewership rank	Avg. viewers (millions)	18–49 rank	Avg. 18–49 rating
1	Tuesday 9:00 pm	13	March 17, 2015	2.29	June 9, 2015	1.45	2014–15	154	2.51	TBD	1.0
2	Tuesday 9:00 pm	19	October 6, 2015	1.53	April 12, 2016	1.22	2015–16	174	1.68	TBD	0.7
3	Tuesday 9:00 pm	13	April 4, 2017	0.95	June 27, 2017	0.86	2016–17	160	1.37	TBD	0.6
4	Monday 9:00 pm	13	February 26, 2018	0.99	May 28, 2018	0.74	2017–18	191	1.24	TBD	0.5
5	Thursday 8:00 pm	13	May 2, 2019	0.73	August 1, 2019	0.75	2018–19	TBD	TBD	TBD	TBD

iZombie : U.S. viewers per episode (millions)

Season	Episode number																		
Season	1	2	3	4	5	6	7	8	9	10	11	12	13	14	15	16	17	18	19
1	2.29	1.99	1.81	1.77	1.85	1.80	1.69	1.62	1.70	1.50	1.56	1.80	1.45	–					
2	1.53	1.22	1.29	1.47	1.43	1.40	1.17	1.55	1.37	1.17	1.43	1.43	1.25	1.45	1.21	1.25	1.07	1.36	1.22
3	0.95	0.87	0.75	0.97	0.93	0.97	0.86	0.98	0.92	0.71	0.78	0.77	0.86	–					
4	0.99	0.77	0.76	0.73	0.72	0.80	0.81	0.68	0.68	0.78	0.72	0.64	0.74	–					
5	0.73	0.58	0.57	0.69	0.67	0.67	0.70	0.60	0.62	0.57	0.71	0.61	0.75	–					

Audience measurement performed by Nielsen Media Research

=== Accolades ===
The fourth season received the ReFrame Stamp, which is awarded by the gender equity coalition ReFrame as a "mark of distinction" for film and television projects that are proven to have gender-balanced hiring, with stamps being awarded to projects that hire female-identifying people, especially those of color, in four out of eight critical areas of their production.

Award	Year (Note: Indicates the year of ceremony)	Category	Nominee(s)	Result	Ref.
Leo Awards	2016	Best Cinematography in a Dramatic Series	Michael Wale (for "Zombie Bro")	Nominated	
Leo Awards	2016	Best Make-Up in a Dramatic Series	Amber Trudeau, Malin Sjostrom, Cory Roberts and Rebekah Bak (for "Method Head")	Won	
MTV Fandom Awards	2015	Best New Fandom of the Year	iZombie	Won	
Teen Choice Awards	2015	Choice TV: Breakout Show	iZombie	Nominated	
Teen Choice Awards	2016	Choice TV Show: Sci-Fi/Fantasy	iZombie	Nominated	
Teen Choice Awards	2017	Choice TV Show: Actress/Comedy	Rose McIver	Nominated	
Teen Choice Awards	2018	Choice Sci-Fi/Fantasy TV Actress	Rose McIver	Nominated	
Teen Choice Awards	2018	Choice Sci-Fi/Fantasy TV Show	iZombie	Nominated	
Teen Choice Awards	2019	Choice Summer TV Actress	Rose McIver	Nominated	

== Home media ==
The first three seasons of the show have been released on DVD and Blu-ray by Warner Home Entertainment and the Warner Archive Collection, respectively. The fourth season did not receive a release due to rights issues, according to Warner Archive. The fourth season cannot be purchased on digital stores. The fifth season was not released, either, supposedly due to the fourth season not being released. Unlike the fourth season, though, the fifth season is available for purchase on digital stores.

Complete season	DVD/Blu-ray release dates			Additional info
Complete season	Region 1 DVD/Region A Blu-Ray	Region 2 DVD	Region 4 DVD	Additional info
1	September 29, 2015 (DVD); July 12, 2016 (Blu-Ray)	September 22, 2016	March 16, 2016	Each season release contains additional features, which include deleted scenes and Comic-Con panels.
2	July 12, 2016 (DVD & Blu-Ray)	May 29, 2017	March 29, 2017	Each season release contains additional features, which include deleted scenes and Comic-Con panels.
3	October 3, 2017 (DVD & Blu-Ray)	—N/a	April 4, 2018	Each season release contains additional features, which include deleted scenes and Comic-Con panels.
4	—N/a	—N/a	—N/a	Warner Archive claims that the fourth season "has clearance issues which preclude a Blu-ray release".
5	—N/a	—N/a	—N/a	
