= List of Sigourney Weaver performances =

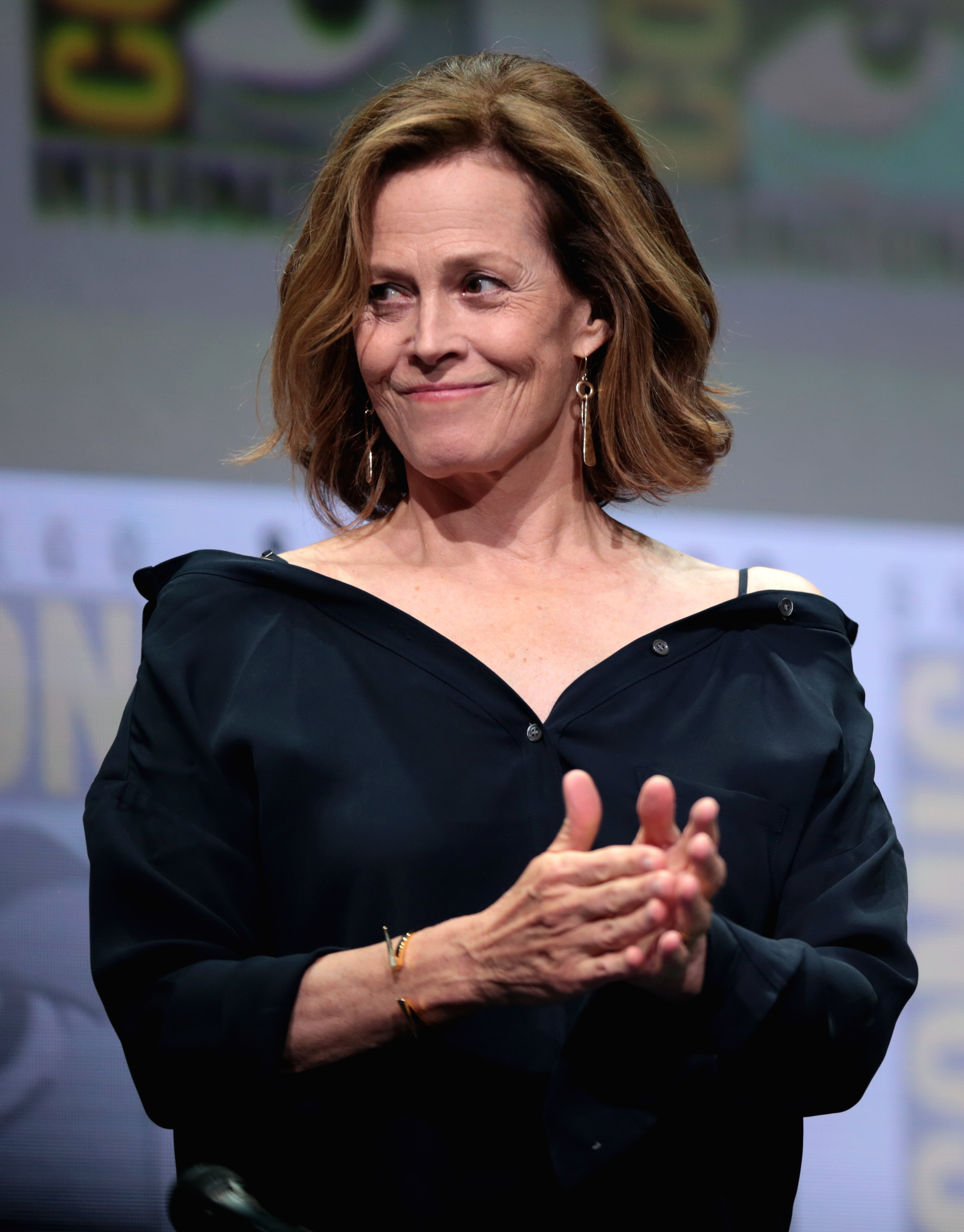
Weaver at the 2017 San Diego Comic-Con

Sigourney Weaver is an American actress who began her career in the early 1970s by appearing in plays. Throughout her career, she has acted in nearly 40 stage productions. She made her film debut with a minor role in Woody Allen's comedy-drama Annie Hall (1977), but her breakthrough came when she portrayed Ellen Ripley in Ridley Scott's science fiction film Alien (1979). She reprised the role in Aliens (1986), this time helmed by director James Cameron. Her performance netted her a nomination for the Academy Award for Best Actress. She returned to the role in two more sequels: Alien 3 (1992) and Alien Resurrection (1997), neither of which were as well received. Although originally written as a male role, Ripley is now regarded as one of the most significant female protagonists in cinema history, and consequently, Weaver is considered to be a pioneer of action heroines in science fiction films.

Although best known for her role in the Alien franchise, Weaver has fostered a prolific filmography, appearing in more than 60 films. In 1981, she starred alongside William Hurt in the neo-noir Eyewitness. Her next role was opposite Mel Gibson in the Peter Weir–directed The Year of Living Dangerously (1982). She played Dana Barrett in Ghostbusters (1984), later returning to the franchise in Ghostbusters II (1989), Ghostbusters (2016), and Ghostbusters: Afterlife (2021). In 1986, Weaver starred opposite Michael Caine in the erotic thriller Half Moon Street. Her next role was primatologist Dian Fossey in Gorillas in the Mist (1988), for which she won a Golden Globe Award for Best Actress in a Motion Picture – Drama. That same year, she also won the Golden Globe Award for Best Supporting Actress – Motion Picture for her performance alongside Harrison Ford in Working Girl. Weaver was the first actor to have two acting wins at the Golden Globes in the same year. She also received an Academy Award nomination for both films.

In 1992, Weaver collaborated with Ridley Scott again, portraying Queen Isabella in 1492: Conquest of Paradise. Two years later, she appeared in the Roman Polanski–directed Death and the Maiden, in a major role opposite Ben Kingsley. Her performance in the Ang Lee–directed The Ice Storm (1997) garnered her a BAFTA Award for Best Actress in a Supporting Role. She next appeared in the science-fiction comedy Galaxy Quest (1999) alongside Tim Allen and Alan Rickman. She then portrayed socialite Babe Paley alongside an ensemble cast in Infamous (2006). In 2009, Weaver reteamed with James Cameron on Avatar, which remained the highest-grossing film of all time for a decade, portraying Dr. Grace Augustine. She will return for multiple Avatar sequels, which are scheduled to be released throughout the 2020s, portraying the Na'vi Kiri, while reprising her original role as Augustine in a cameo in Avatar: The Way of Water (2022). She worked with Tim Allen again on the comedy Crazy on the Outside (2010). In 2014, she collaborated with Scott for a third time on Exodus: Gods and Kings, in which she played Tuya.

Weaver has done extensive voiceover work and has had multiple roles in animated films, including The Tale of Despereaux (2008) and Pixar films WALL-E (2008) and Finding Dory (2016). She has narrated or appeared in 14 documentaries, such as the BBC series Planet Earth (2006) and The Beatles: Eight Days a Week (2016). Weaver has also lent her voice to three audio-books, four film soundtracks, and two video games: James Cameron's Avatar: The Game (2009) and Alien: Isolation (2014). Weaver has also voice acted on the television shows Futurama, Penn Zero: Part-Time Hero, and SpongeBob SquarePants, among others.

== Filmography ==
=== Film ===
Key
| † | Denotes films that have not yet been released |

Table featuring films with Sigourney Weaver
| Year | Title | Role | Notes | Ref. |
|---|---|---|---|---|
| 1977 | Annie Hall | Alvy's date outside theater | | |
| 1978 | Madman | Gale | | |
| 1979 | Alien | Ellen Ripley | | |
| 1981 | Eyewitness | Tony Sokolow | | |
| 1982 | The Year of Living Dangerously | Jill Bryant | | |
| 1983 | Deal of the Century | Catherine DeVoto | | |
| 1984 | Ghostbusters | Dana Barrett | | |
| 1985 | One Woman or Two | Jessica Fitzgerald | French-language role | |
| 1986 | Half Moon Street | Dr. Lauren Slaughter | | |
| 1986 | Aliens | Ellen Ripley | | |
| 1988 | Gorillas in the Mist | Dian Fossey | | |
| 1988 | Working Girl | Katharine Parker | | |
| 1989 | Ghostbusters II | Dana Barrett | | |
| 1992 | Alien 3 | Ellen Ripley | Also co-producer | |
| 1992 | 1492: Conquest of Paradise | Queen Isabella | | |
| 1993 | Dave | Ellen Mitchell | | |
| 1994 | The Wild Swans | Narrator | Voice; Short film | |
| 1994 | Death and the Maiden | Paulina Escobar | | |
| 1995 | Copycat | Dr. Helen Hudson | | |
| 1995 | Jeffrey | Debra Moorhouse | | |
| 1997 | The Ice Storm | Janey Carver | | |
| 1997 | Alien Resurrection | Ripley Clone 7 / Ripley Clone 8 | Also co-producer | |
| 1999 | A Map of the World | Alice Goodwin | | |
| 1999 | Galaxy Quest | Gwen DeMarco / Lieutenant Tawny Madison (Note: In the film, actor DeMarco portrays Madison in a television show.) | | |
| 2000 | Company Man | Daisy Quimp | | |
| 2001 | Heartbreakers | Angela Nardino / Max Conners / Olga Ivanova (Note: Weaver plays a conwoman who assumes multiple false identities.) | | |
| 2002 | Tadpole | Eve Grubman | | |
| 2002 | The Guys | Joan | | |
| 2003 | Holes | Louise Walker | | |
| 2004 | Imaginary Heroes | Sandy Travis | | |
| 2004 | The Village | Alice Hunt | | |
| 2006 | Snow Cake | Linda Freeman | | |
| 2006 | The TV Set | Lenny | | |
| 2006 | Infamous | Babe Paley | | |
| 2007 | Happily N'Ever After | Frieda | Voice | |
| 2007 | The Girl in the Park | Julia Sandburg | | |
| 2008 | Vantage Point | Rex Brooks | | |
| 2008 | Be Kind Rewind | Ms. Lawson | | |
| 2008 | Baby Mama | Chaffee Bicknell | | |
| 2008 | WALL•E | Axiom Computer | Voice | |
| 2008 | The Tale of Despereaux | Narrator | Voice | |
| 2009 | Avatar | Dr. Grace Augustine | | |
| 2010 | Crazy on the Outside | Vicky Zelda | | |
| 2010 | You Again | Ramona "Aunt Mona" Clark | | |
| 2011 | Cedar Rapids | Marcy Vanderhei | | |
| 2011 | Paul | 'The Big Guy' | | |
| 2011 | Abduction | Dr. Geraldine 'Geri' Bennett | | |
| 2011 | Rampart | Joan Confrey | | |
| 2012 | The Cabin in the Woods | The Director | | |
| 2012 | Red Lights | Margaret Matheson | | |
| 2012 | The Cold Light of Day | Jean Carrack | | |
| 2012 | Vamps | Cisserus | | |
| 2014 | My Depression (The Up and Down and Up of It) | Swados | Voice; Short film | |
| 2014 | Exodus: Gods and Kings | Tuya | | |
| 2015 | Chappie | Michelle Bradley | | |
| 2016 | Finding Dory | Herself | Voice | |
| 2016 | Ghostbusters | Dr. Rebecca Gorin | Cameo | |
| 2016 | A Monster Calls | Grandma O'Malley | | |
| 2016 | The Assignment | Dr. Rachel Jane | | |
| 2017 | The Meyerowitz Stories | Herself | Cameo | |
| 2017 | Rakka | Jasper | Short film | |
| 2020 | My Salinger Year | Margaret | | |
| 2021 | The Good House | Hildy Good | | |
| 2021 | Ghostbusters: Afterlife | Dana Barrett | Mid-credits cameo | |
| 2022 | Call Jane | Virginia | | |
| 2022 | Master Gardener | Mrs. Norma Haverhill | | |
| 2022 | Avatar: The Way of Water | Kiri / Dr. Grace Augustine | | |
| 2025 | The Gorge | Bartholomew | | |
| 2025 | Dust Bunny | Laverne | | |
| 2025 | Avatar: Fire and Ash | Kiri / Dr. Grace Augustine | | |
| 2026 | The Mandalorian and Grogu | Ward | | |

=== Television ===
Table featuring television shows with Sigourney Weaver
| Year | Title | Role | Notes | Ref. |
|---|---|---|---|---|
| 1963-1982 | The Doctors | | Unknown episodes NBC | |
| 1976 | Somerset | Avis Ryan | 1 episode | |
| 1986, 2010 | Saturday Night Live | Herself (host) | 2 episodes | |
| 1997 | Snow White: A Tale of Terror | Lady Claudia Hoffman | Television film | |
| 2002 | Futurama | The Female Planet Express Ship | Voice; Episode: "Love and Rocket" | |
| 2008 | Eli Stone | Therapist | Episode: "The Path" | |
| 2009 | Prayers for Bobby | Mary Griffith | Television film | |
| 2012 | Political Animals | Elaine Barrish | 6 episodes | |
| 2015, 2017 | Penn Zero: Part-Time Hero | Lady Starblaster | Voice; 2 episodes | |
| 2015, 2017 | Doc Martin | Beth Traywick | 2 episodes | |
| 2017 | The Defenders | Alexandra Reid | 6 episodes | |
| 2019 | Full Frontal with Samantha Bee | Ripley | Episode: "Not the White House Correspondents' Dinner 2019" | |
| 2019 | SpongeBob SquarePants | Herself | Episode: "SpongeBob's Big Birthday Blowout" | |
| 2019 | The Dark Crystal: Age of Resistance | The Myth Speaker | Voice; Episode: "End. Begin. All the Same." | |
| 2020 | Call My Agent! | Sigourney Weaver | Episode: "Sigourney" | |
| 2023 | The Lost Flowers of Alice Hart | June Hart | 7 episodes; Also executive producer | |
| TBA | Tomb Raider † | Evelyn Wallis | Main role; Filming | |

== Theatre ==
Table featuring theatrical productions with Sigourney Weaver
| Year | Title | Role | Location | Ref. |
|---|---|---|---|---|
| 1971 | Better Dead Than Sorry | Jenny | Yale Repertory Theatre | |
| 1972 | Story Theatre | Unknown | Williamstown Theatre Festival | |
| 1972 | Sarah B. Divine! | Anita, The Eternal Maid | Williamstown Theatre Festival | |
| 1972 | The Resistible Rise of Arturo Ui | Dockdaisy | Williamstown Theatre Festival | |
| 1972 | The Rat Trap | Cynthia Muldoon | Williamstown Theatre Festival | |
| 1972 | Once in a Lifetime | Florabel Leigh | Williamstown Theatre Festival | |
| 1972 | The Elephant Calf | Unknown | Williamstown Theatre Festival | |
| 1972 | The Tempest | Unknown | Yale Repertory Theatre | |
| 1973–74 | Watergate Classics | Unknown | Yale Repertory Theatre | |
| 1974 | Rise and Fall of the City of Mahagonny | Unknown | Yale University Theatre | |
| 1974 | The Nature and Purpose of the Universe | Eleanor | Direct Theatre | |
| 1974 | The Frogs | Chorus Member | Yale Repertory Theatre | |
| 1975 | The Constant Wife | Marie-Louise Durham | Shubert Theatre | |
| 1976 | Titanic | Lidia / Annabella / Harriet | Direct Theatre | |
| 1976 | Das Lusitania Songspiel | Unknown | Van Dam Theatre; Also co-authored the play with Christopher Durang | |
| 1976 | Gemini | Judith Hastings | Playwrights Horizons | |
| 1978 | Marco Polo Sings a Solo | Freydis | Public/Newman Theatre | |
| 1978 | Conjuring an Event | Annabella | American Place Theatre | |
| 1978 | A Flea in Her Ear | Unknown | Hartford Stage | |
| 1979 | New Jerusalem | Unknown | Public Theater | |
| 1980 | Das Lusitania Songspiel | Unknown | Westside Theatre | |
| 1981 | Beyond Therapy | Prudence | Phoenix Theatre | |
| 1982 | Animal Kingdom | Cecelia Henry | Berkshire Festival | |
| 1983 | Old Times | Anna | Williamstown Theatre Festival | |
| 1984–85 | Hurlyburly | Darlene | Ethel Barrymore Theatre | |
| 1986 | A Streetcar Named Desire | Stella Kowalski | Williamstown Theatre Festival | |
| 1986–87 | The Merchant of Venice | Portia | Classic Stage Company | |
| 1988 | The Show-Off | Clara | Williamstown Theatre Festival | |
| 1996 | Sex and Longing | Lulu | Cort Theatre | |
| 2001–02 | The Guys | Joan | The Flea Theater | |
| 2002 | The Mercy Seat | Abby Prescott | Acorn Theatre | |
| 2004 | Mrs. Farnsworth | Marjorie Farnsworth | The Flea Theater | |
| 2007 | Crazy Mary | Lydia | Playwrights Horizons | |
| 2007 | Love Letters | Melissa Gardner | The Flea Theater (Single benefit) | |
| 2008 | Love Letters | Melissa Gardner | The Detroit Film Theatre (Single benefit) | |
| 2012–13 | Vanya and Sonia and Masha and Spike | Masha | Mitzi E. Newhouse Theater | |
| 2019 | The Investigation: A Crime in Ten Acts | Herself | Riverside Church | |
| 2024 | Vanya and Sonia and Masha and Spike | Masha | Mitzi E. Newhouse Theatre (One Night Only) | |
| 2024–25 | The Tempest | Prospero | Theatre Royal, Drury Lane, West End debut | |

== Voice roles ==
=== Documentaries ===
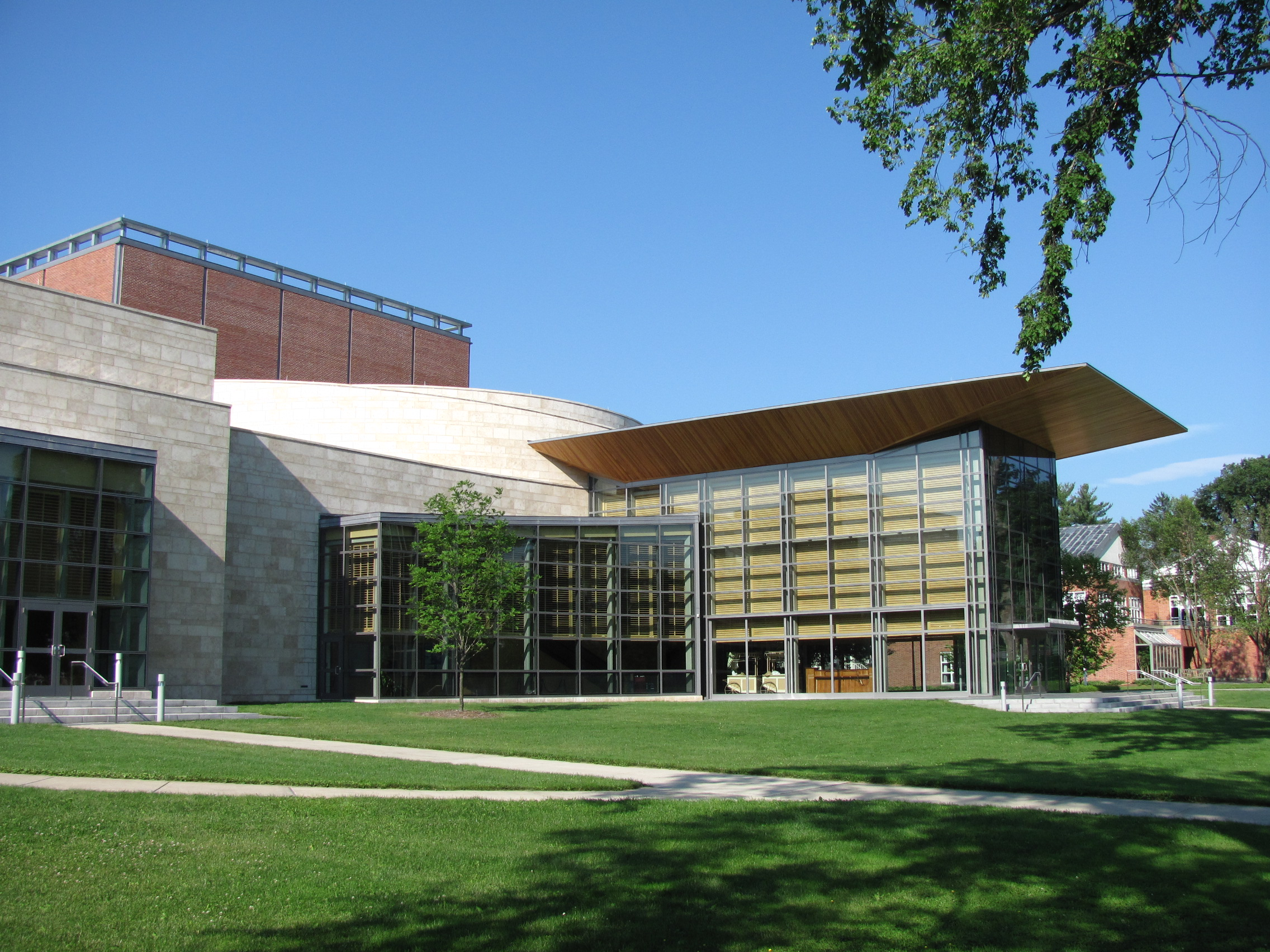
Many of Weaver's first performances were at the Williamstown Theatre Festival in Massachusetts.

Table featuring documentaries with Sigourney Weaver
| Year | Title | Role | Notes | Ref. |
|---|---|---|---|---|
| 1988 | Helmut Newton: Frames from the Edge | Herself | | |
| 1999 | Get Bruce | Herself | | |
| 1999 | Why Dogs Smile & Chimpanzees Cry | Narrator | | |
| 2001 | The Roman Empire in the First Century | Narrator | | |
| 2003 | Search for the Afghan Girl | Narrator | | |
| 2006 | Planet Earth | Narrator | | |
| 2006 | Gorillas Revisited | Herself | | |
| 2009 | ACID TEST: The Global Challenge of Ocean Acidification | Narrator | Voice and image | |
| 2015 | Ingrid Bergman: In Her Own Words | Herself | | |
| 2016 | The Beatles: Eight Days a Week | Herself | | |
| 2017 | Laddie: The Man Behind the Movies | Herself | | |
| 2017 | Dian Fossey: Secrets in the Mist | Dian Fossey | Voice role | |
| 2018 | Dream the Future | Narrator | | |
| 2019 | Cleanin' Up the Town: Remembering Ghostbusters | Herself | | |
| 2021 | Secrets of the Whales | Narrator | | |

=== Video games ===
Table featuring video games with Sigourney Weaver
| Year | Title | Voice role | Notes | Ref. |
|---|---|---|---|---|
| 2009 | James Cameron's Avatar: The Game | Dr. Grace Augustine | PS3/Xbox 360/Microsoft Windows, Wii/PSP versions | |
| 2014 | Alien: Isolation | Ellen Ripley | Cameo in main game; lead role in "Crew Expendable" and "Last Survivor" DLCs | |

=== Audio books ===
Table featuring audio books with Sigourney Weaver
| Year | Title | Author | Publisher | Ref. |
|---|---|---|---|---|
| 1992 | The Snow Queen | Hans Christian Andersen | Lightyear Entertainment | |
| 1994 | Peachboy | Eric Metaxas | Rabbit Ears | |
| 2007 | Little Bear | Else Holmelund Minarik | Harper Children's Audio | |

== Soundtrack discography ==
Table songs with Sigourney Weaver
| Year | Film | Track | Ref. |
|---|---|---|---|
| 1993 | Dave | "Tomorrow" | |
| 2001 | Heartbreakers | "Back in the U.S.S.R." | |
| 2006 | Snow Cake | "Deep in the Heart of Texas" | |
| 2007 | The Girl in the Park | "Ooh Shoo Be Doo Be" | |

== See also ==
- List of awards and nominations received by Sigourney Weaver
