= River's End =

River's End may refer to:

- The River's End (novel), a 1919 best-selling adventure novel by James Oliver Curwood
  - The River's End (film), a 1920 film adaptation starring Lewis Stone
  - River's End (1930 film), another adaptation directed by Michael Curtiz and featuring Charles Bickford
  - River's End (1940 film), a third adaptation of the novel starring Dennis Morgan
- River's End, a 1989 book by Leslie McLeay and Nancy Cato

== See also ==
- The End of the River, a 1947 British film
