= List of awards and nominations received by Sigourney Weaver =

Sigourney Weaver awards and nominations
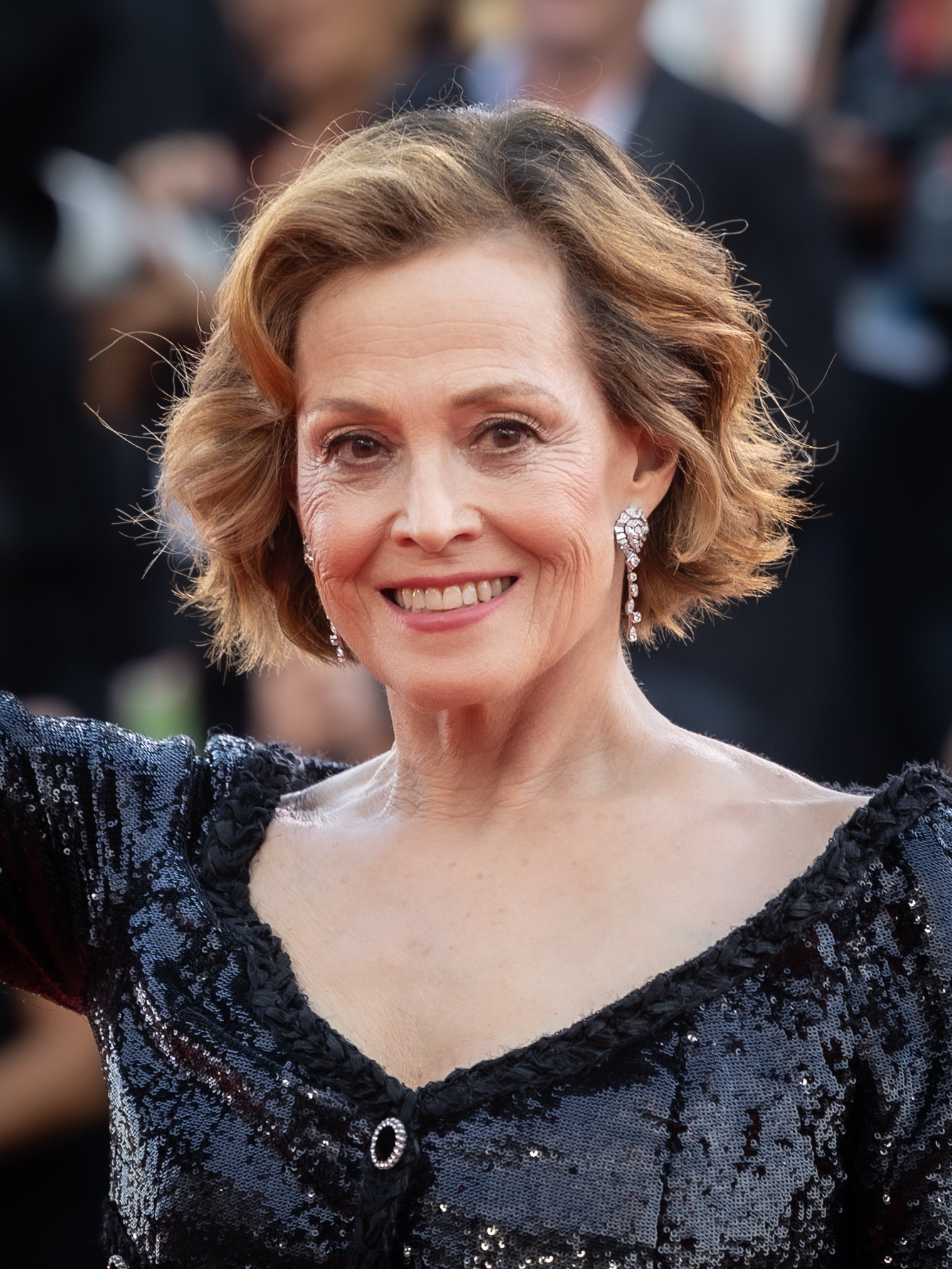
- Weaver at the 2024 Venice Film Festival
Awards and nominations
Award	Wins	Nominations
Totals
Academy Awards	0	3
BAFTA Awards	1	3
Golden Globe Awards	2	7
Primetime Emmy Awards	0	4
Saturn Awards	2	6
Screen Actors Guild Awards	0	3
Wins	7
Nominations	25

Sigourney Weaver is an American actress known for her performances in film, television and stage. Over the course of her over five decade long career she has received several awards including a BAFTA Award, two Golden Globe Awards, and a Grammy Award as well as nominations for three Academy Awards, four Primetime Emmy Awards, three Screen Actors Guild Awards and a Tony Award.

Weaver received Academy Award nominations for her roles as Ellen Ripley in James Cameron's science fiction-action film Aliens (1986), portraying primatologist Dian Fossey in the Michael Apted directed biographical drama film Gorillas in the Mist (1988), and as a villainous boss in the Mike Nichols directed romantic comedy Working Girl (1988). She won the Golden Globe Award for Best Actress - Motion Picture Drama Gorillas in the Mist (1988) and the Golden Globe Award for Best Supporting Actress for Working Girl (1988). She won the BAFTA Award for Best Actress in a Supporting Role for her role as a mother engaging in an affair in the Ang Lee family drama film The Ice Storm (1997).

For her roles on television, she was Primetime Emmy Award and Screen Actors Guild Award nominated for playing Claudia Hoffman in the horror film Snow White: A Tale of Terror (1998), Mary Griffith in the drama film Prayers for Bobby (2009), and a fictional former Secretary of State and First Lady in the political miniseries Political Animals (2012). On stage, she received a Tony Award for Best Featured Actress in a Play nomination for her role as a scatterbrained photojournalist in the Broadway production of the David Rabe dark comedy play Hurlyburly (1985).

She is one of 12 actors in Academy Award history to receive two acting nominations in the same year. Weaver has also received a Grammy Award for Best Spoken Word Album. In 2024 she received the Venice International Film Festival's Golden Lion for Lifetime Achievement.

The following is a list of awards and nominations received by Sigourney Weaver.

== Major associations ==
=== Academy Awards ===
Year	Category	Nominated work	Result	Ref.
1987	Best Actress	Aliens	Nominated	
1989	Best Actress	Gorillas in the Mist	Nominated	
1989	Best Supporting Actress	Working Girl	Nominated	

=== BAFTA Awards ===
Year	Category	Nominated work	Result	Ref.
British Academy Film Awards
1979	Most Promising Newcomer	Alien	Nominated	
1989	Best Actress in a Supporting Role	Working Girl	Nominated	
1997	Best Actress in a Supporting Role	The Ice Storm	Won	

=== Emmy Awards ===
Year	Category	Nominated work	Result	Ref.
Primetime Emmy Awards
1998	Outstanding Lead Actress in a Miniseries or Movie	Snow White: A Tale of Terror	Nominated	
2009	Outstanding Lead Actress in a Miniseries or Movie	Prayers for Bobby	Nominated	
2013	Outstanding Lead Actress in a Miniseries or Movie	Political Animals	Nominated	
2021	Outstanding Narrator	Secrets of the Whales (episode: "Ocean Giants")	Nominated	

=== Golden Globe Awards ===
Year	Category	Nominated work	Result	Ref.
1987	Best Actress – Motion Picture Drama	Aliens	Nominated	
1989	Best Actress – Motion Picture Drama	Gorillas in the Mist	Won	
1989	Best Supporting Actress – Motion Picture	Working Girl	Won	
1998	Best Supporting Actress – Motion Picture	The Ice Storm	Nominated	
2000	Best Actress – Motion Picture Drama	A Map of the World	Nominated	
2010	Best Actress – Miniseries or TV Movie	Prayers for Bobby	Nominated	
2013	Best Actress – Miniseries or TV Movie	Political Animals	Nominated	

=== Grammy Awards ===
Year	Category	Nominated work	Result	Ref.
2011	Best Spoken Word Album	Earth (The Book)	Won	

=== Screen Actors Guild Awards ===
Year	Category	Nominated work	Result	Ref.
1998	Outstanding Female Actor in a Miniseries or TV Movie	Snow White: A Tale of Terror	Nominated	
2010	Outstanding Female Actor in a Miniseries or TV Movie	Prayers for Bobby	Nominated	
2013	Outstanding Female Actor in a Miniseries or TV Movie	Political Animals	Nominated	

=== Tony Awards ===
Year	Category	Nominated work	Result	Ref.
1985	Best Featured Actress in a Play	Hurlyburly	Nominated	

== Industry awards ==
Organizations	Year	Category	Work	Result	Ref.
Critics' Choice Awards	2012	Best Actress - Miniseries or TV Movie	Political Animals	Nominated	
Drama Desk Awards	1980	Outstanding Actress in a Musical	Das Lusitania Songspiel	Nominated	
Goya Awards	2016	Best Supporting Actress	A Monster Calls	Nominated	
Goya Awards	2024	International Goya Award		Won	
Saturn Awards	1979	Best Actress	Alien	Nominated	
Saturn Awards	1986	Best Actress	Aliens	Won	
Saturn Awards	1992	Best Actress	Alien 3	Nominated	
Saturn Awards	1997	Best Actress	Alien Resurrection	Nominated	
Saturn Awards	1999	Best Actress	Galaxy Quest	Nominated	
Saturn Awards	2009	Best Supporting Actress	Avatar	Won	
Saturn Awards	2025	Best Supporting Actress	Dust Bunny	Won	

== Special awards ==
Year	Organization	Award	Ref.
1998	Hasty Pudding Theatricals	Hasty Pudding Woman of the Year	
1999	Hollywood Walk of Fame	Star (7021 Hollywood Boulevard)	
2001	Chicago International Film Festival	Lifetime Achievement Award	
2004	Empire Awards	Lifetime Achievement Award	
2006	Edinburgh International Film Festival	Diamond Award	
2010	Scream Awards	Heroine Award	
2013	Golden Camera (Germany)	Best International Actress	
2016	San Sebastián International Film Festival	Donostia Award	
2024	Spanish Film Academy	International Goya Award	
2024	Venice Film Festival	Golden Lion for Lifetime Achievement	
2026	Legion of Honour	Honoured	
