= River's End (1940 film) =

1940 film

- Directed by: Ray Enright
- Written by: Barry Trivers; Bertram Millhauser; Fred Niblo Jr.
- Based on: The River's End; 1919 novel by James Oliver Curwood
- Produced by: William Jacobs; Bryan Foy; Jack L. Warner
- Starring: Dennis Morgan; Elizabeth Inglis; George Tobias
- Cinematography: Arthur L. Todd
- Edited by: Clarence Kolster
- Music by: Clifford Vaughan; Howard Jackson
- Production company: Warner Bros. Pictures
- Distributed by: Warner Bros. Pictures
- Release date: August 10, 1940
- Running time: 69 minutes
- Country: United States
- Language: English

River's End is a 1940 American Western film directed by Ray Enright and starring Dennis Morgan, Elizabeth Inglis (credited as Elizabeth Earl) and George Tobias. It is an adaptation of the 1919 novel The River's End by James Oliver Curwood, which had previously been made into 1920 and 1930 films. It is also known by the alternative title, Double Identity.

The film is a Northern in which a Royal Northwest Mounted Police officer tracks an escaped convict, but eventually believes in his innocence.

The film's sets were designed by the art director Esdras Hartley.

== Plot ==
In the frontier town of River's End, Alberta, in the early 1900s, John Keith is wrongly convicted of murdering Roger Cass.

After being sentenced to hang, Keith escapes custody. Andy Dijon, his French-Canadian friend, is ready with a canoe and provisions, and Keith heads alone into the northern wilderness.

Sergeant Derry Conniston, newly-arrived from the Fort McMurray detachment, is ordered by Inspector McDowell of the Royal Northwest Mounted Police to track and apprehend Keith. For fourteen months Conniston follows Keith's trail across Saskatchewan, Manitoba, and the Northwest Territories.

Near the Mackenzie River, a couple of weeks after settling in a remote cabin for the winter, Keith finds Conniston unconscious in the snow with a broken leg, suffering from exposure. He looks after the incapacitated Mountie for several weeks.

Keith shaves off his beard and Conniston is struck by how much they look alike. Convinced of Keith's innocence, and near death, he urges Keith to take his place in River's End and find the murderer.

Keith is skeptical until the arrival of Constables Jeffers and Kentish, who have been sent to find Conniston. They take for granted that Keith is the Mountie, and when the dying Conniston tells them he is Keith, the subterfuge is sealed.

Keith returns to River's End posing as the late Sergeant Conniston, and is given permission to look into the closed murder case. He suspects the murdered man's business partner, Norman Talbot, who lied at the trial.

Talbot is friendly and wants to know if the Mountie learned anything from his dying prisoner that could incriminate him and his associates, Balt and Crandall. Keith hides his suspicion and puts Talbot at ease.

Keith confides to his friend Andy Dijon, but others are readily taken in by his imposture. Even Conniston's sister Linda is fooled—she has come to town for a visit, having not seen her brother for six years. Keith is perturbed when a romance develops between Linda and Talbot.

At a barn dance, Andy overhears Talbot admonish Crandall for drinking and talking too much. To exploit this rift, Andy provokes Crandall into a brawl at the saloon, giving Keith an excuse to jail him. Keith dissuades Talbot from posting bail, and the frustrated Crandall feels abandoned. Keith tells him that he is a suspect in the Cass murder, and encourages him to betray Talbot to save his own neck.

Linda and Talbot announce they are getting married and leaving town as soon as possible. Desperate for Linda to reconsider, Keith tells her the truth, but she is distressed to learn that her brother is dead, and thinks Keith killed him.

Brought before Inspector McDowell, Keith admits his deception. But Constables Jeffers and Kentish confirm that he did not kill Conniston, and Andy extracts a confession from Crandall, who reveals that Talbot murdered Cass over a business dispute.

Inspector McDowell orders his Mounties to arrest Talbot, who has fled with Linda, though it is John Keith who brings him in. Talbot is tried, convicted and sentenced to hang.

On behalf of her late brother, Linda receives a medal from Inspector McDowell. Andy marries his long-suffering girlfriend, and observes sardonically that John had troubles but is now free, whereas he was free and is now married to Cheeta. Even as the couple prepares to embark on their honeymoon, the mercurial Cheeta questions her choice of husband, complaining that Andy is stupid, lazy, and ugly, and that French Canadians do not make good papas. She brightens when Andy (alluding anachronistically to the Dionne quintuplets) points out that the only man in the world who is papa to five babies at the same time is French Canadian. They happily set out in their canoe, waving goodbye to Linda and John.

== Cast ==
- Dennis Morgan as John Keith/Sergeant Derry Conniston
- Elizabeth Earl as Linda Conniston
- George Tobias as Andy Dijon
- Victor Jory as Norman Talbot
- James Stephenson as Inspector McDowell
- Steffi Duna as Cheeta
- Edward Pawley as Frank Crandall
- John Ridgely as Constable Jeffers
- Frank Wilcox as Constable Kentish
- David Bruce as Balt
- Gilbert Emery as Justice
- Stuart Robertson as Sergeant Cruze

== Bibliography ==
- Pitts, Michael R. Western Movies: A Guide to 5,105 Feature Films. McFarland, 2012.
