= Landslide (1937 film) =

- Opening titles
- Directed by: Donovan Pedelty
- Written by: Donovan Pedelty; David Evans
- Produced by: Victor M. Greene
- Starring: Jimmy Hanley; Dinah Sheridan; Jimmy Mageean; Elizabeth Inglis
- Production company: Crusade Films
- Distributed by: Paramount British Pictures
- Release date: January 1937
- Running time: 67 minutes
- Country: United Kingdom
- Language: English

Landslide is a 1937 British drama film directed by Donovan Pedelty and starring Jimmy Hanley, Dinah Sheridan and Jimmy Mageean. It was written by Pedelty and David Evans.

== Plot ==
After a visiting theatre troupe's performance concludes and the audience departs, a murder victim is found in a Welsh theatre. A local police officer instructs the remaining people that they must stay in the theatre while he seeks assistance. However, a torrential rain causes a landslide, leaving the actors, stage crew, police officer and local woman stranded in the theatre. They are trapped there for days with their only food what the local woman had in her bag – a small piece of cheese and her fish and chips. Then one of the people is attacked, and they realize that the murderer is still in the building.

== Cast ==
- Jimmy Hanley as Jimmy Haddon
- Dinah Sheridan as Dinah Shaw
- Jimmy Mageean as Harry McGovern
- Ann Cavanagh as Lena Petrie
- Elizabeth Inglis as Vera Grant
- Bruno Barnabe as Bob White
- David Arnold as Sgt. Llewellyn

== Production ==
The film was made at Wembley Studios as a quota quickie for release by Paramount Pictures.

== Reception ==
The Monthly Film Bulletin wrote: "The story, direction and production are all by Donovan Pedelty. This is too great a task for one man, and the film has suffered in consequence. In spite of this, and an uneasiness on the part of the players in becoming hysterical, the film manages to be entertaining in its own harrowing way. Dinah Sheridan and Jimmy Hanley promise well for the future and the support is quietly competent."

Kine Weekly wrote: "Pathological crime drama, original in theme and atmosphere, but less than third rate in acting, treatment and presentation."

Picturegoer wrote: "Donovan Pedelty has written an ingenious story dealing with murder of the cashier of a stranded travelling show. ... Unfortunately, neither treatment nor presentation does justice to the psychology of the theme. The acting, too, is generally weak and, instead of becoming strong drama, the picture turns into unconscious burlesque."

In British Sound Films: The Studio Years 1928–1959 David Quinlan rated the film as "mediocre", writing: "Promising but muffed thriller."
