= Elizabeth Inglis =

English actress (1913–2007)

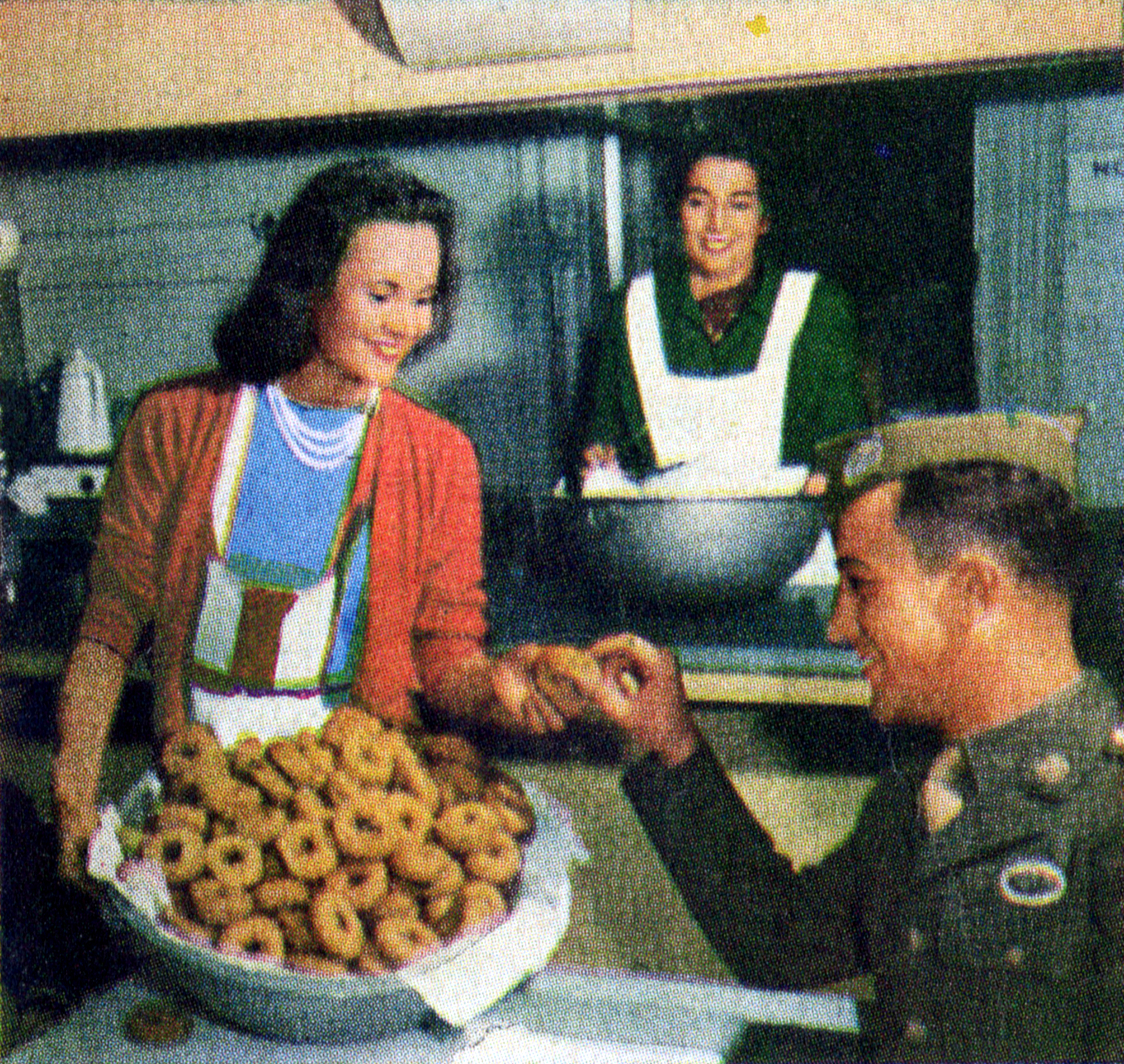
- Inglis (left) working at the Stage Door Canteen in 1944
- Born: Desiree Mary Lucy Hawkins; 10 July 1913; Colchester, Essex, England
- Died: 25 August 2007 (aged 94); Santa Barbara, California, U.S.
- Other name: Elizabeth Earl
- Citizenship: American (from 1943)
- Occupation: Actress
- Years active: 1934–1945
- Spouse: Pat Weaver (m. 1942; died 2002)
- Children: 2, including Sigourney Weaver
- Relatives: Doodles Weaver (brother-in-law)

Elizabeth Inglis (born Desiree Mary Lucy Hawkins; married name Weaver; 10 July 1913 – 25 August 2007) was an English actress. She was best known for her role in The Letter and for being the mother of American actress Sigourney Weaver.

== Early life ==
Inglis was born Desiree Mary Lucy Hawkins on 10 July 1913 in Colchester to Alan George Hawkins, a solicitor, and Margaret Inglis Hawkins (née Hunt).

== Career ==
Inglis' screen debut was in the film Borrowed Clothes (1934). She then had a small part as Hilary Jordan in Alfred Hitchcock's film The 39 Steps (1935). She played the young maid Nancy in the original British production of Patrick Hamilton's play Gas Light, which premiered on 5 December 1938 and closed on 10 June 1939 after 141 performances. Inglis and the rest of the cast recreated their stage roles for a 1939 television presentation performed live on BBC Television. In Hollywood, Inglis played Adele Ainsworth in William Wyler's film The Letter (1940). By this time, she was using the stage name Elizabeth Earl.

== Personal life ==
Inglis was married to American television executive Pat Weaver from 1942 until his death in 2002. She retired from acting after they married. The couple had two children, including actress Sigourney Weaver. On 15 November 1943, Inglis became an American citizen.

In a deleted scene from Aliens (1986), a photograph of Inglis was used to portray Amanda Ripley, the elderly daughter of Weaver's character Ellen Ripley.

== Death ==
Inglis died on 25 August 2007 in Santa Barbara, California at the age of 94.

== Filmography ==
Year	Title	Role	Notes
1934	Borrowed Clothes	Barbara	
1935	The 39 Steps	Hilary, Professor Jordan's daughter	Uncredited
1937	Thunder in the City	Dolly	
1937	Landslide	Vera Grant	
1937	Museum Mystery	Ruth Carter	
1939	Gas Light	Nancy	TV movie
1940	My Love Came Back	Party Guest	Uncredited
1940	River's End	Linda Conniston	Credited as Elizabeth Earl
1940	The Letter	Adele Ainsworth	Credited as Elizabeth Earl
1945	Tonight and Every Night	Joan	Uncredited, offscreen credit (as Elizabeth Inglise)
1986	Aliens	Amanda Ripley	Uncredited (appears in a photograph in the extended edition)
