= River's End (1930 film) =

1930 film

- Lantern slide
- Directed by: Michael Curtiz
- Screenplay by: Charles Kenyon
- Based on: The River's End; 1919 novel by James Oliver Curwood
- Starring: Charles Bickford; Evalyn Knapp
- Cinematography: Robert Kurrle
- Edited by: Ralph Holt
- Music by: Erno Rapee
- Distributed by: Warner Bros. Pictures
- Release date: November 1, 1930 (U.S.)
- Running time: 75 minutes
- Country: United States
- Language: English

River's End is a 1930 American pre-Code Western film directed by Michael Curtiz and starring Charles Bickford and Evalyn Knapp. Bickford plays two roles, a Royal Canadian Mounted Police (RCMP) sergeant and the man he is after. The film is the second of three adaptations of the bestselling novel The River's End by James Oliver Curwood, the others being released in 1920 and 1940.

== Plot ==
River's End (1930)

In remote northern Canada, Sergeant Conniston seeks to capture escaped convicted murderer Keith. He is accompanied by O'Toole, a guide who is constantly drunk. When he finally catches his quarry, he is shocked to find that they look exactly alike.

On their way back to the RCMP post, however, their sled overturns. Keith takes Conniston's gun and sled and leaves the policeman and his guide to die in the snow. Keith starts to feel guilty about what he has done. He turns back and takes the men to an emergency cabin. In spite of this, Conniston dies of a frozen lung.

After talking to Keith for a while, O'Toole becomes convinced of his innocence. He coaches Keith so that he can pass himself off as the sergeant. O'Toole is not well enough to travel, so Keith goes to the RCMP post alone.

Once he arrives, Keith tells McDowell, the post commanding officer, that it was Keith who died. McDowell then informs him that Keith was innocent; the real murderer confessed. Worried that he will be accused of Conniston's murder if his true identity is discovered, Keith plans to escape across the border.

There are complications. Miriam, McDowell's daughter, had been Conniston's girl, but she decided to break up with him. Keith is very much attracted to her, and proves to be much more romantic than Conniston. Miriam finds herself falling in love with him. Mickey, O'Toole's young son, had adopted Conniston as a substitute father. He eventually realizes that Keith is not the sergeant, but Keith manages to persuade him to keep his secret.

Keith goes to see McDowell to ask for his daughter's hand in marriage, only to discover that a jealous rival had made inquiries. Conniston, it turns out, was married. McDowell orders him to leave the base in disgrace. Before he goes, he confesses the truth to Miriam. Then, refusing to sneak away, Keith braves a beating from a gauntlet of angry Mounties and boards a ship, accompanied by Mickey. At the last minute, Miriam boards as well.

== Cast ==
- Charles Bickford as Keith and Sergeant Conniston
- Evalyn Knapp as Miriam
- J. Farrell MacDonald as O'Toole
- ZaSu Pitts as Louise
- Walter McGrail as Martin
- David Torrence as McDowell
- Frank Coghlan, Jr. as Mickey
- Tom Santschi as Shotwell
- George Tobias as Andy Dijon

== Production ==
River's End was filmed on location at Sacramento and the foothills of Auburn, California.

== Preservation status ==
- The Library of Congress holds a copy of this film in their collection.
