= Baby with the Bathwater =

Play written by Christopher Durang

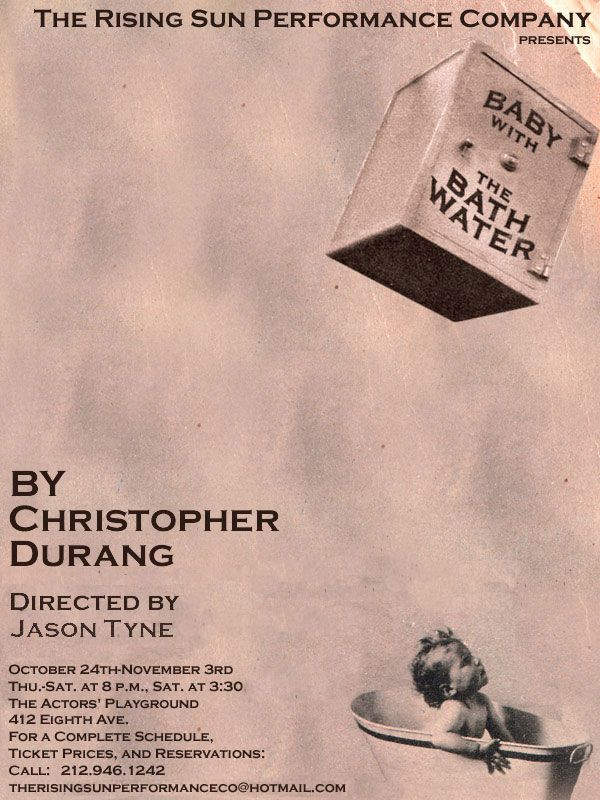
- Poster for New York City production
- Written by: Christopher Durang
- Original language: English

Premiere
- Date premiered: March 31, 1983

Baby with the Bathwater is a play by Christopher Durang about a boy named Daisy, his influences, and his eventual outcome.

== Synopsis ==
=== Act I ===
Two parents who are completely unprepared for parenthood bring home their newborn baby. The two cannot seem to name the baby. John thinks the baby is a boy, but Helen says the doctors said they could decide later. When the baby cries, the two cannot quite decide what to do. To their rescue comes Nanny – who enters their apartment as if by magic, and is full of abrupt shifts of mood, first cooing at the baby soothingly, then screaming at it. In subsequent scenes, John and Nanny have an affair, Helen takes baby and leaves, only to come back a moment later rain-soaked and unhappy.

=== Act II ===
By the time the baby is a toddler, Daisy has finally been named. At this age Daisy has a penchant for running in front of buses and for lying, depressed, in piles of laundry. The audience hears an alarming essay Daisy has written in school, and the principal, the terrifying Miss Willoughby, is oblivious to the essay’s cry for help, and instead gleefully awards it an "A" for style. Years later, Daisy enters dressed as a girl, but obviously a young man. The audience follows his years of therapy, where he alternates between feelings of depression and anger, and is unable to complete his freshman essay on Gulliver’s Travels despite having been in college for five years. In a scene reminiscent of the beginning of the play, Daisy (who has since chosen a new name) and his young bride fondly regard their own baby, determined not to repeat their parents' calamitous mistakes.

== Response ==
=== Critical reception ===
"Mr. Durang is one of our theater’s brightest hopes – he knows how to write funny plays, which makes him a rarity. In Baby with the Bathwater, he manages to combine all three modes farce, satire, good-humored wackiness … Durang keeps laughter bubbling... We laugh and gasp at the same time." Sylviane Gold, The Wall Street Journal.

"Christopher Durang is one of the funniest dramatists alive, and one of the most sharply satiric. This time, parenthood is the target. Keith Reddin, as the former Daisy, is the perfect Durang leading man, puzzled and gravely polite, until he finally asserts himself." Edith Oliver, The New Yorker

"Nanny – a warped Mary Poppins as played by Dana Ivey – believes that cuddling children only spoils them. She gives the baby a rattle made of asbestos, lead and Red Dye No. 2. … Daisy proves a fuller creation than the outrageous facts suggest. Watching the character undergo therapy, we feel the pain that leads him to have more than 1,700 sexual partners, that makes it impossible for him to find an identity or a name. A playwright who shares Swift’s bleak view of humanity, [Durang] conquers bitterness and finds a way to turn rage into comedy that is redemptive as well as funny." Frank Rich, The New York Times.

== Production history ==
- Premiere, March 31, 1983 by American Repertory Theatre in Cambridge, Massachusetts, directed by Mark Linn-Baker
- Off-Broadway, November 9, 1983 by Playwrights Horizons in New York City, directed by Jerry Zaks
- At Virginia Highlands in Abingdon, Virginia, 1993. Performed by The VHCC Players, starring Melissa Kenny-Roberts & Dean Roberts-Lowe, directed by Gary Aday.
- Tap Gallery, 2000 by Mustardseed Theatre Co in Sydney, Australia, starring Jose Element, Rebecca Hamilton, Julian Garner, directed by Felicity Jurd
- Off-off-Broadway, June 15, 2002 by Rising Sun Performance Company in New York City, directed by Jason Tyne
- September 5, 2007 by La Pavana at Teatro Lara in Madrid, directed by Rafael Calatayud
- Off-off-Broadway, August 8, 2009 by Threshold Theatre Company in Melbourne, Australia, directed by TBA
- October 2012 by Ghost Light Projects in Vancouver, BC, Canada, directed by Randie Parliament & Greg Bishop
- February/March 2015 by Fury Theater at Indian Boundary Park in Chicago, Illinois, directed by Kaitlin Taylor
- January 16, 2016 by Brisbane Arts Theatre in Brisbane, Australia, directed by John Boyce
- November 4, 2017 by Blood, Love and Rhetoric at Divadlo D21 in Prague, directed by Abigail Rice
