= Pat Weaver =

American television executive (1908–2002)

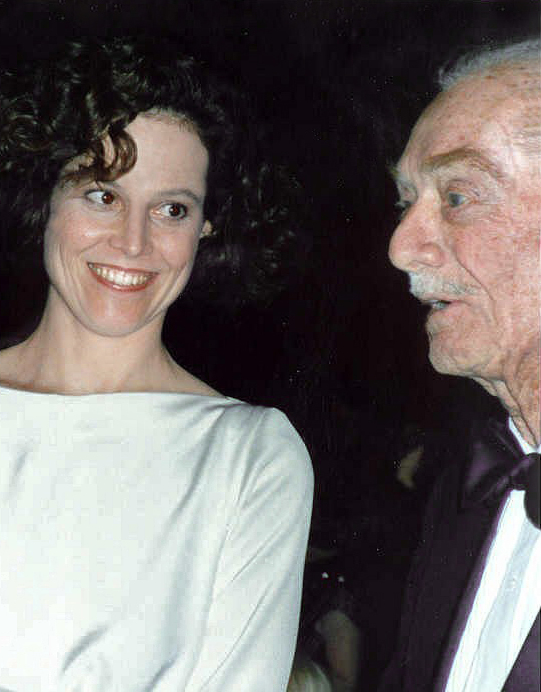
- Weaver with his daughter Sigourney in 1989
- Born: Sylvester Laflin Weaver Jr. December 21, 1908; Los Angeles, California, U.S.
- Died: March 15, 2002 (aged 93); Santa Barbara, California, U.S.
- Other name: Sylvester Weaver
- Education: Dartmouth College
- Occupation: Broadcasting executive
- Years active: 1930–1970
- Spouse: Elizabeth Inglis (m. 1942)
- Children: 2, including Sigourney
- Relatives: Doodles Weaver (brother)

Sylvester Laflin "Pat" Weaver Jr. (December 21, 1908 – March 15, 2002) was an American broadcasting executive who was president of NBC between 1953 and 1955. He has been credited with reshaping the format and philosophy of commercial broadcasting as radio gave way to television as America's dominant home entertainment medium. Actress Sigourney Weaver is his daughter.

== Early life and education ==
Born in Los Angeles, Sylvester Laflin Weaver Jr. was the son of Eleanor Isabel (née Dixon) and Sylvester Laflin Weaver. His brother was comedian Doodles Weaver.

Weaver was of English and Scottish descent (possibly Clan MacFarlane), as well as of Ulster-Scots, Dutch and early New England ancestry (going back to the early days of the Massachusetts Bay Colony). He was related to Matthew Laflin, an American manufacturer of gunpowder, businessman, philanthropist, and an early pioneer of Chicago. Both were descendants of Charles Laflin, a gunpowder manufacturer, who came to America in 1740 from Ulster, Ireland, settling in Oxford, Massachusetts. Charles Laflin and his family were living in Oxford when he purchased land in 1749 in Westfield, Massachusetts.

Weaver graduated from Dartmouth College in 1930, where he was a member of Phi Beta Kappa and Phi Kappa Psi fraternity.

He served in the United States Navy during World War II from 1942 to 1945.

== Career ==
Weaver worked for the Young & Rubicam advertising agency and American Tobacco during the golden age of radio. In the mid-1930s he produced Fred Allen's Town Hall Tonight radio show, and he then supervised all the agency's radio programming. NBC hired him in 1949 to challenge CBS's programming lead. At NBC, Weaver established many operating practices that became standard for network television. He introduced the practice of networks producing their own television programming, then selling advertising time during the broadcasts. Prior to that, ad agencies usually created each show for a particular client. Because commercial announcements could now more easily be sold to more than one company sponsor for each program, a single advertiser pulling out would not necessarily threaten a program.

Weaver created Today in 1952, followed by Tonight Starring Steve Allen (1954), Home (1954) with Arlene Francis and Wide Wide World (1955), hosted by Dave Garroway. There are those who dispute Weaver's credit for The Tonight Show, including host Jack Paar, but during the first ever Tonight Show broadcast, Steve Allen credited Weaver and the NBC network as the creator of the show alongside Today and Home. During a broadcast of The Tonight Show Starring Johnny Carson, both the host and his guest Dick Cavett stated that Weaver created both Today and The Tonight Show. Years later, Paar said "He didn't invent programs, but wrote great memos."

He believed that broadcasting should educate as well as entertain. He required NBC shows to include at least one sophisticated cultural reference or performance per installment — including a segment of a Verdi opera adapted to the comic style of Sid Caesar and Imogene Coca's groundbreaking Your Show of Shows. Weaver did not ignore NBC Radio, either. In 1955, as network radio was dying, Weaver helped revive it with NBC Monitor, a weekend-long magazine-style programming block that featured an array of news, music, comedy, drama, sports, and anything that could be broadcast within magazine style, with rotating advertisers and some of the most memorable names in broadcast journalism, entertainment and sports.

He was the developer of the magazine style of advertising whereby sponsors would purchase blocks of time (typically one to two minutes) in a show, rather than sponsor an entire show. This style suited the networks. Like a magazine, a television network could now control what advertisements were being broadcast and no one advertiser could own exclusive rights to a particular show.

Advertisers and network executives agreed that radio audiences preferred live broadcasts to prerecorded shows. Weaver believed that ratings for radio had declined because listeners were tired of predictable, regularly scheduled shows. For NBC he advocated for television spectaculars, live, 90-minute special programs with high production values and costs. While some, like Peter Pan, were very successful, CBS's more traditional programming of regularly scheduled and prefilmed shows like I Love Lucy were more popular, less expensive, and could be rerun. NBC fired Weaver in August 1956; he never worked for another network.

NBC Monitor long outlived Weaver's tenure running the network. His successors (first, David Sarnoff's son, Robert; then, Robert Kintner) standardized the network's programming practices. In November 1960, years after leaving NBC, Weaver displayed his frustration with the network in an article in the Sunday edition of The Denver Post. What once was the Golden Age of Television in the early 1950s slowly diminished by the end of the decade into the early 1960s, when he claimed networks made a series of bad decisions. In the article he noted management problems within NBC, CBS, and ABC: "Television has gone from about a dozen forms to just two – news shows and the Hollywood stories. The blame lies in the management of NBC, CBS and ABC. Management doesn't give the people what they deserve. I don't see any hope in the system as it is."

Weaver proposed on at least two occasions a fourth television network (dubbed the "Pat Weaver Prime Time Network") that never came to fruition. He also lent his talents as a consultant for radio and television activities to Freedomland U.S.A., a New York City theme park, during its 1960 debut. He is featured in the book Freedomland U.S.A.: The Definitive History (Theme Park Press, 2019).

In 1985, Pat Weaver was inducted into the Television Hall of Fame.

== Personal life and death ==
Weaver married Elizabeth Inglis in 1942. She was born Desiree Mary Lucy Hawkins (daughter of Alan G. Hawkins and Margaret I. Hunt) on July 10, 1913, in Colchester, Essex, England; and died on August 25, 2007, in Santa Barbara, California. She made her screen debut in Borrowed Clothes (1934) as well as a number of small parts in some of Alfred Hitchcock's early movies. She reached the high point of her career when she co-starred with Bette Davis in William Wyler's movie The Letter. She retired from acting when she married in 1942. The couple had two children, Trajan Victor Charles Weaver and actress Sigourney Weaver (born Susan Alexandra Weaver).

Pat Weaver died in 2002 of natural causes at his home in Santa Barbara at age 93.

== Notes ==
Preceded by None	President of NBC; 1953–1955	Succeeded by Robert Sarnoff
