= Gorillas Revisited =

2006 television film

Gorillas Revisited is a 2006 BBC documentary starring American actress Sigourney Weaver. The role is a call-back to her portrayal of Dian Fossey in Gorillas in the Mist (1988).

== Plot ==
The documentary follows the life of primatologist and conservationist Dian Fossey, recounted by Weaver.

== Production ==
The documentary was filmed in Rwanda.
