= Titanic (play) =

Play by Christopher Durang

Titanic is a one-act play written by Christopher Durang. The play was initially presented at the Yale School of Drama in 1974.

== Overview ==
The play takes place on the RMS Titanic, called an "outrageous tale of sex and seduction aboard the titular ship" by Jackson R. Bryer (professor of English at the University of Maryland) and Mary C. Hartig.

== Productions ==
The play was presented in a workshop in 1973 at the American Place Theatre. It was then performed at the Yale School of Drama, Yale Experimental Theatre, in May 1974. Directed by Peter Mark Shifter, the cast featured Kate McGregor Stewart as Victoria Tammurai, Kenneth Ryan as Richard Tammurai, Joel Polis as Teddy Tammurai (their son), Christine Estabrook as Lidia, Robert Nersesian as The Captain, and Richard Bey as Higgins (the sailor).

The play premiered at the Direct Theatre in New York City in February 1976. Directed by Shifter, the cast featured Stewart, Stefan Hartman as Richard Tammurai, Richard Peterson as Teddy Tammurai, Sigourney Weaver as Lidia, Jeff Brooks as The Captain, and Ralph Redpath as the sailor.

David Dukes was set to play the part of Richard Tammurai, but left before rehearsals ended to replace John Wood in the Broadway play Travesties.

Titanic premiered Off-Broadway at the Van Dam Theater, running from May 10, 1976, to May 16, 1976. The director and cast were the same as in the Direct Theatre production. Titanic had its uk premier as a christopher durang double bill along with the actors nightmare off westend at the Southwark playhouse by impact productions both directed by Dudley Long running from the 6 of June to the 11 of June 1994 the uk cast featured nick westlake as the captain and John Courtney as Teddy Tammurai

== Plot ==
Titanic opens in the Titanic's dining room, where the Tammurais (Richard, Victoria, and their son Teddy) are seated. Pondering why they haven't been seated at the captain's table, Richard suggests that the "snub" may be a result of Victoria's less-than-noble past growing up on a pig farm in Indiana. Victoria in turn announces that she wants a divorce and further reveals that Teddy is not Richard's natural son, which prompts Richard to claim that their unseen daughter Annabella is not Victoria's natural daughter. From here, there is a comedic blur between three characters: Annabella, Harriet Lindsey, and Lidia, the latter of whom is confusingly (but amusingly) the captain's daughter...or is she?

With Victoria and Richard at odds, Lidia—who keeps and feeds a variety of animals in her vagina—befriends Teddy and coerces him into non-consensual bondage scenarios. Meanwhile, Victoria begins a lurid affair with the passionate captain while Richard ravenously pursues and humiliates Higgins, a young sailor. On several occasions, it appears that the vessel has struck that fabled iceberg and is sinking (a fate Annabella, Harriet/Lidia desperately desires), but the sounds of catastrophe are always followed by an announcement that it was merely the captain's wife broadcasting from a sound effects record—a practical joke that ultimately prompts the captain to execute his wife. Following her funeral, the characters decide a wedding is in order—Victoria will marry Annabella/Harriet Lindsey, and Richard will marry Teddy (who he has by now begun to call Dorothy). In the final scene, we return to the Titanic's dining room where Teddy and Annabella/Harriet/Lidia exact deadly revenge on Richard and Victoria, just before it appears once more that the ship has struck an iceberg...but has it?

=== Notable actors who have appeared in Titanic ===
- Christine Estabrook – Lidia
- Richard Bey – Higgins, the Sailor
- Sigourney Weaver – Lidia
