= International Goya Award =

Annual award by the Spanish Film Academy

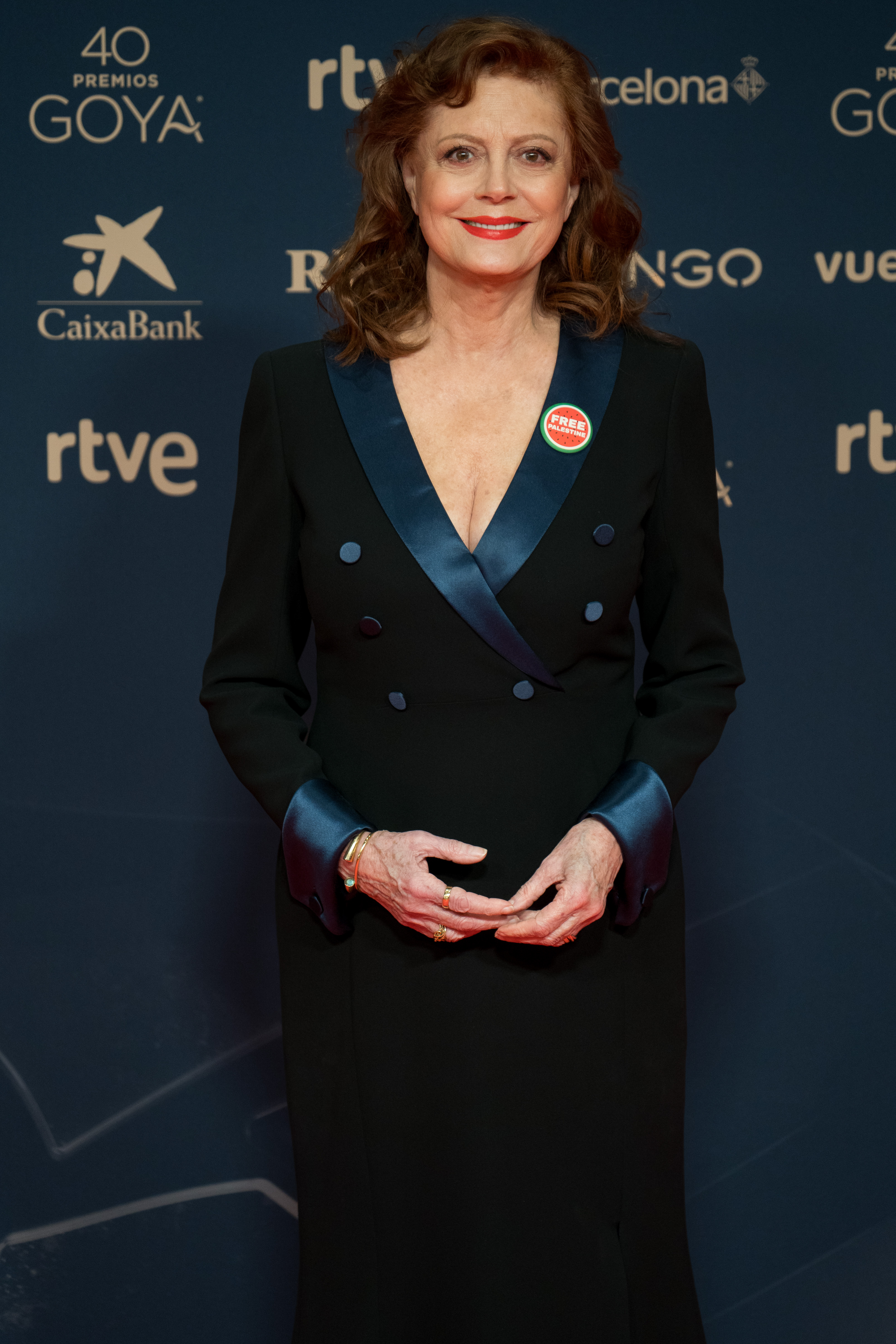
- The 2026 recipient: Susan Sarandon
- Native name: Premio Goya Internacional
- Awarded for: Lifetime achievement
- Country: Spain
- Presented by: Academy of Cinematographic Arts and Sciences of Spain (AACCE)
- First award: 36th Goya Awards
- Most recent winner: (United States) Susan Sarandon (2026)
- Website: Official website

The International Goya Award (Spanish: Premio Goya Internacional) is one of the Goya Awards presented annually by the Academy of Cinematographic Arts and Sciences of Spain (AACCE) since the 36th edition of the awards. It is a non-competitive award that honors "artists that have contributed to cinema as a medium that brings together different cultures and people".

== Laureates ==
=== 2020s ===
Year	Image	Recipient	Profession	Nationality	Ref.
2022 (36th)		Cate Blanchett	Actress and producer	Australia	
2023 (37th)		Juliette Binoche	Actress	France	
2024 (38th)		Sigourney Weaver	Actress	United States	
2025 (39th)		Richard Gere	Actor	United States	
2026 (40th)		Susan Sarandon	Actress	United States	
