= Sigourney Weaver =

American actress (born 1949)

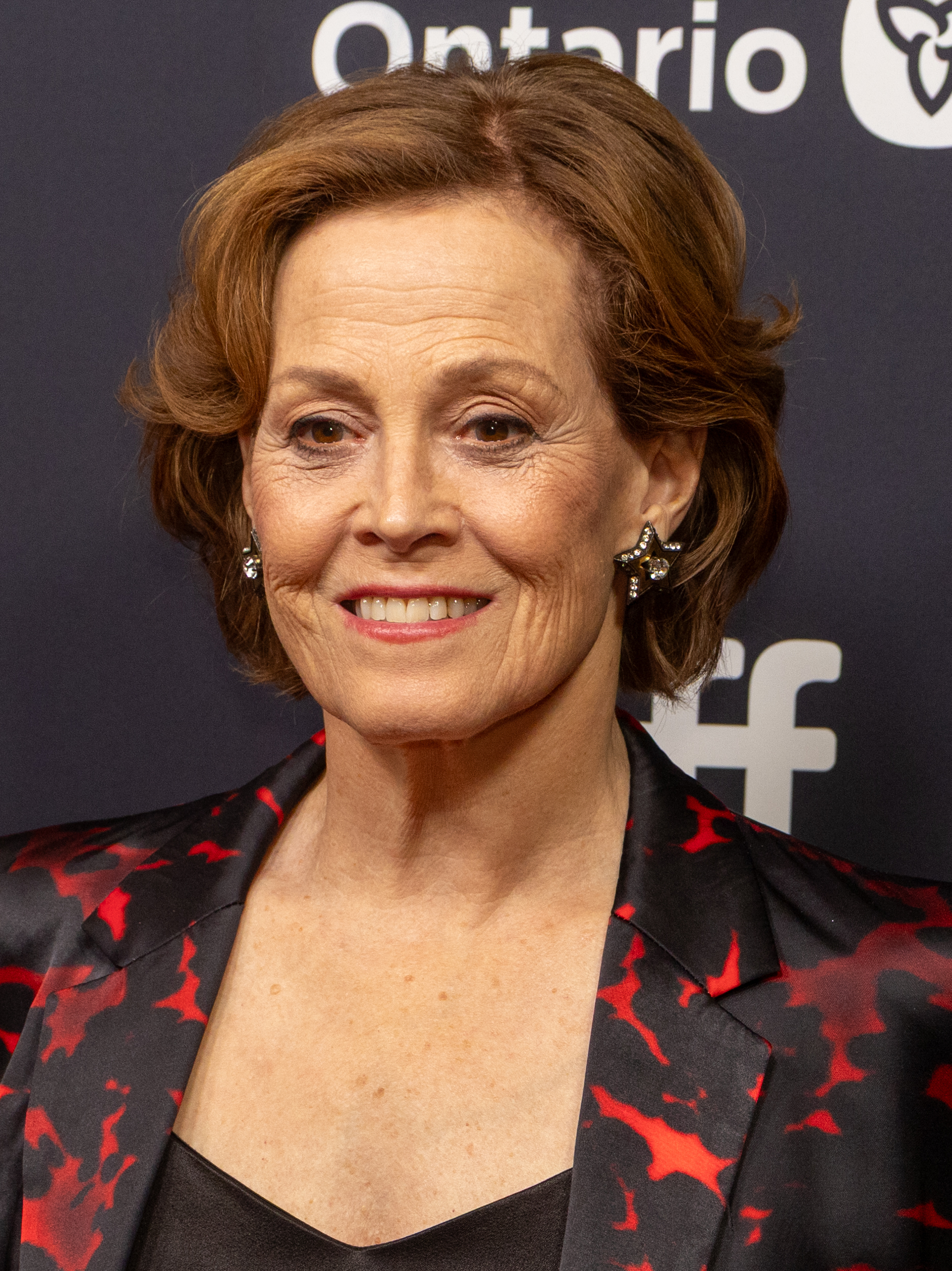
- Weaver in 2025
- Born: Susan Alexandra Weaver; October 8, 1949 (age 77); New York City, U.S.
- Education: Sarah Lawrence College; Stanford University (BA); Yale University (MFA)
- Occupation: Actress
- Years active: 1971–present
- Works: Full list
- Spouse: Jim Simpson (m. 1984)
- Children: 1
- Parents: Pat Weaver; Elizabeth Inglis
- Relatives: Doodles Weaver (paternal uncle)
- Awards: Full list

Susan Alexandra "Sigourney" Weaver (/sɪˈɡɔːrni/ sig-OR-nee; born October 8, 1949) is an American actress. Prolific in film since the late 1970s, she is known for her pioneering portrayals of action heroines in blockbusters and for her various roles in independent films. She is the recipient of numerous accolades, including a British Academy Film Award, two Golden Globe Awards, and a Grammy Award, in addition to nominations for three Academy Awards, four Primetime Emmy Awards, and a Tony Award.

Born in New York City, Weaver is the daughter of American television executive Pat Weaver and English actress Elizabeth Inglis. She made her screen debut with a minor role in the romantic comedy film Annie Hall (1977), before landing her breakthrough role as Ellen Ripley in the science fiction horror film Alien (1979). She reprised the role in the sequel Aliens (1986), earning a nomination for the Academy Award for Best Actress, and in two more films for the franchise. Ripley is regarded as a significant female protagonist in cinema history. Weaver's other franchise roles include Dana Barrett in the Ghostbusters films (1984–2021) and Dr. Grace Augustine and Kiri in the Avatar film series (2009–present), which rank among the highest-grossing films of all time.

In 1989, Weaver won two Golden Globes and two simultaneous Oscar nominations for her roles as Dian Fossey in Gorillas in the Mist and as an executive in Working Girl (both 1988); she also became the first actor to win two Golden Globes for acting in the same year. She then won the British Academy Film Award for Best Supporting Actress for her role in The Ice Storm (1997). Other film roles include The Year of Living Dangerously (1982), Copycat (1995), Galaxy Quest (1999), Heartbreakers (2001), The Village (2004), Vantage Point (2008), Chappie (2015), A Monster Calls (2016), and The Gorge (2025). She also had voice roles in the Pixar animated films WALL-E (2008) and Finding Dory (2016).

On stage, Weaver's Broadway performances include The Constant Wife (1975), Hurlyburly (1984), Vanya and Sonia and Masha and Spike (2013), and The Tempest (2025); her performance in Hurlyburly earned her a nomination for the Tony Award for Best Featured Actress in a Play. On television, she received Emmy Award nominations for her roles in the horror film Snow White: A Tale of Terror (1998), the drama film Prayers for Bobby (2009), the miniseries Political Animals (2013), and for narrating the National Geographic documentary Secrets of the Whales (2021). Her other television projects include the Marvel Cinematic Universe superhero miniseries The Defenders (2017) and the drama miniseries The Lost Flowers of Alice Hart (2023).

== Early life and education ==
Weaver was born in New York City, the daughter of English actress Elizabeth Inglis and American television executive Pat Weaver. Her father served as president of NBC from 1953 to 1955, during which time he created The Today Show. Pat's brother, Doodles Weaver, was a comedian and contributor to Mad. She is of Dutch, English, German, Irish and Scottish descent through her father.

At the age of 14, Weaver began using the name "Sigourney" after she took it from a minor character in The Great Gatsby. She briefly attended the Brearley School and Chapin School in New York before arriving at the Ethel Walker School in Simsbury, Connecticut, where she developed an early interest in performing. One of her early roles was in a school adaptation of the poem "The Highwayman", and on another occasion she played a Rudolph Valentino character in an adaptation of The Sheik. She was also involved in theatrical productions of A Streetcar Named Desire and You Can't Take It with You during one summer in Southbury, Connecticut. Known for her height, she reportedly reached 180 cm (5 ft 11 in) by the age of 11, which had a negative impact on her self-esteem; she recalled feeling like "a giant spider" and never having "the confidence to ever think [she] could act".

In 1967, shortly before turning 18, Weaver visited Israel and volunteered on a kibbutz for several months. Upon returning to the United States, she attended Sarah Lawrence College. After her freshman year, she transferred to Stanford University as an English major. At Stanford, she was extensively involved in theater. She performed with a group in Palo Alto named The Company, doing Shakespeare plays and "commedia dell'arte in a covered wagon" around the Bay Area, the nature of which she considered "outrageous". She "dressed like an elf and lived in a tree house" and avoided Stanford's drama department as she believed their productions were too "stuffy" and "safe". She had planned to enter Stanford's Ph.D. English program and eventually pursue a career as a writer or a journalist, but changed her mind after getting frustrated by the "deadly dry" honors courses. She eventually graduated in 1972 with a BA in English. She subsequently applied to the Yale School of Drama, performing Bertolt Brecht's Saint Joan of the Stockyards at her audition, and was accepted.

Weaver admitted that she had a difficult time at Yale. She was not fond of the shows at Yale Repertory Theatre, and had little luck getting lead roles in school productions. Some of her acting teachers referred to her as "talentless" and advised her to stick to comedy. She later said she pulled through due to her time at the Yale Cabaret, and with the help of friends such as Christopher Durang, who kept casting her in his plays. She graduated from Yale with an MFA in 1974.

== Career ==
=== 1970s: Initial work and breakthrough ===
Weaver performed in the first production of the Stephen Sondheim musical The Frogs while at Yale in 1974, alongside Larry Blyden and fellow students Meryl Streep and Durang. She was briefly an understudy in a John Gielgud production of Captain Brassbound's Conversion thereafter. She also acted in numerous original plays by Durang. In 1974 she made her Broadway debut in the William Somerset Maugham play The Constant Wife acting opposite Ingrid Bergman. Before her on-screen breakthrough, she had appeared only in commercials, a few television roles (including an appearance in the soap opera Somerset), and had a small part in the Woody Allen-directed romantic comedy-drama Annie Hall (1977). Her originally more substantial Annie Hall role was scaled back due to her commitment to the Durang play Titanic.

"One of the real pleasures of Alien is to watch the emergence of both Ellen Ripley as a character and Sigourney Weaver as a star."

— Ty Burr, The Boston Globe, 29 October 2003

Weaver appeared two years later as Warrant Officer / Lieutenant Ripley in Ridley Scott's blockbuster film Alien (1979), in a role initially designated to co-star British-born actress Veronica Cartwright until a late change in casting. Cartwright stated to World Entertainment News Network (WENN) that she was in England ready to start work on Alien when she discovered that she would be playing the navigator Lambert in the project, and Weaver had been given the lead role of Ellen Ripley. Reviews of the film were initially mixed, but it has since been ranked among the greatest science fiction horror films and is Weaver's first film to be inducted into the National Film Registry by the Library of Congress. Film critic Gene Siskel called Weaver "an actress who should become a major star," and Peter Bradshaw of The Guardian said that Weaver "begins the action looking girlish and serious, but changes into the toughly self-reliant woman who defined her subsequent roles. Her career evolves before our very eyes." Among other accolades, she was nominated for Most Promising Newcomer to Leading Film Roles at the 33rd British Academy Film Awards.

=== 1980s: Stardom and acclaim ===
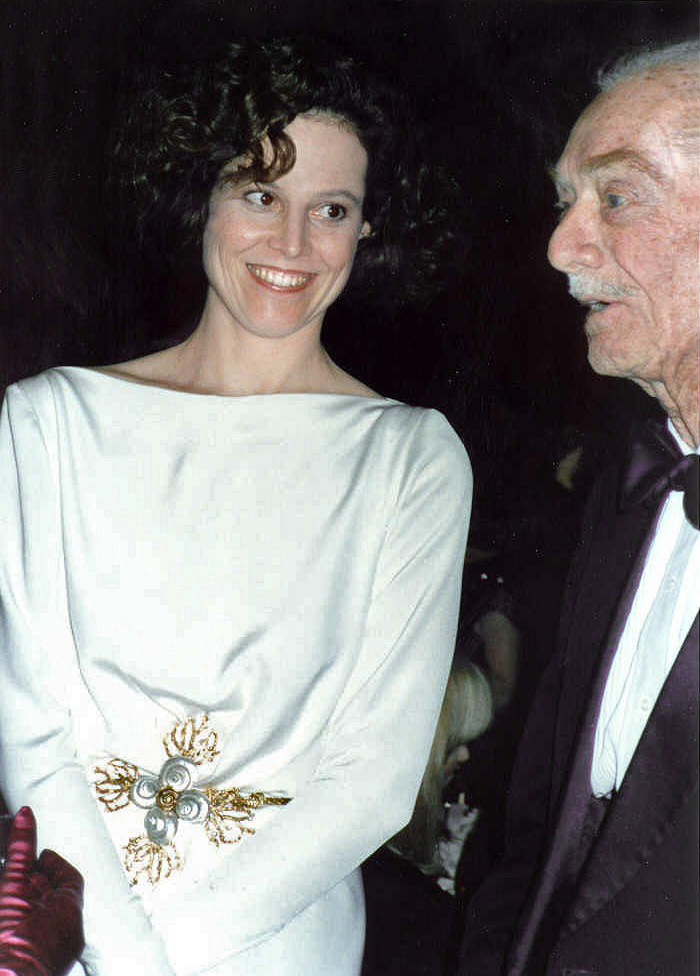
Weaver and her father Pat at the 61st Academy Awards in 1989, where she received simultaneous nominations for Best Actress and Best Supporting Actress

Weaver appeared in an off-Broadway production of Durang's comedy Beyond Therapy in 1981, which was directed by then-fledgling director Jerry Zaks. She next appeared opposite Mel Gibson as British Embassy officer Jill Bryant in the Peter Weir directed romantic drama The Year of Living Dangerously (1982) which was released to critical acclaim. Roger Ebert opined, "Weaver has a less interesting role but is always an interesting actress". In 1984 she returned to Broadway acting in the David Rabe play Hurlyburly acting opposite William Hurt, Harvey Keitel, Cynthia Nixon, Jerry Stiller, Ron Silver, and Judith Ivey. The production was directed by Mike Nichols with Weaver taking on the role of Darlene, a scatterbrained photojournalist who gets involved with two roommates. The role earned Weaver a nomination for the Tony Award for Best Actress in a Play. That same year she took the female leading role Dana Barrett in the comedy films Ghostbusters (1984) and reprised her role in Ghostbusters II (1989) acting alongside Bill Murray, Dan Aykroyd and Harold Ramis.

Weaver reprised the role of Ellen Ripley seven years later in the sequel to Alien, similarly titled Aliens (1986) directed by James Cameron. Critic Roger Ebert wrote "Weaver, who is onscreen almost all the time, comes through with a very strong, sympathetic performance: She's the thread that holds everything together." Variety said that, at that point, she was the only actress who could "open" an action movie. For Aliens, she won the Saturn Award for Best Actress and earned her first nominations for the Academy Award for Best Actress and the Golden Globe Award for Best Actress in a Motion Picture – Drama.

In 1988, Weaver starred as primatologist Dian Fossey in the biographical drama Gorillas in the Mist. The same year, she appeared opposite Harrison Ford and Melanie Griffith in a supporting role as manipulative corporate executive Katharine Parker in the comedy-drama Working Girl. Weaver won two Golden Globe Awards in the same year (Best Actress in a Motion Picture – Drama and Best Supporting Actress – Motion Picture) for both roles. Also at the Golden Globes that year, Weaver was one of three actresses to win Best Actress, alongside Jodie Foster and Shirley MacLaine, in a three-way tie. She was the first of four actresses (as of 2026) to have won two Golden Globes in the same year. Weaver received simultaneous Academy Award nominations in 1988—Best Actress for Gorillas in the Mist and Best Supporting Actress for Working Girl. She lost both nominations.

=== 1990s: Continued awards success ===
Weaver returned to the big screen with Alien 3 (1992) and Ridley Scott's 1492: Conquest of Paradise (1992) in which she played the role of Queen Isabella. In the early 1990s, Weaver appeared in several films, including Dave opposite Kevin Kline and Frank Langella. In 1994, she starred in Roman Polanski's drama Death and the Maiden as Paulina Escobar. She played the role of agoraphobic criminal psychologist Helen Hudson in Copycat (1995). Weaver also concentrated on smaller and supporting roles, such as Jeffrey (1994) with Nathan Lane and Patrick Stewart.

In 1997, she appeared in Ang Lee's The Ice Storm as Janey Carver, a bored but stylish housewife trapped in a failed marriage. Weaver earned her second Golden Globe Award for Best Supporting Actress – Motion Picture nomination and won the BAFTA Award for Best Actress in a Supporting Role. In 1999, she co-starred as Gwen DeMarco in the science fiction comedy hit Galaxy Quest and as Alice Goodwin, a mother and school nurse whose negligence results in the accidental drowning of a friend's toddler in the drama A Map of the World, earning her a third nomination for the Golden Globe Award for Best Actress in a Motion Picture – Drama for the latter. She also received a star on the Hollywood Walk of Fame on December 16th that same year.

=== 2000s: Blockbusters and voice roles ===
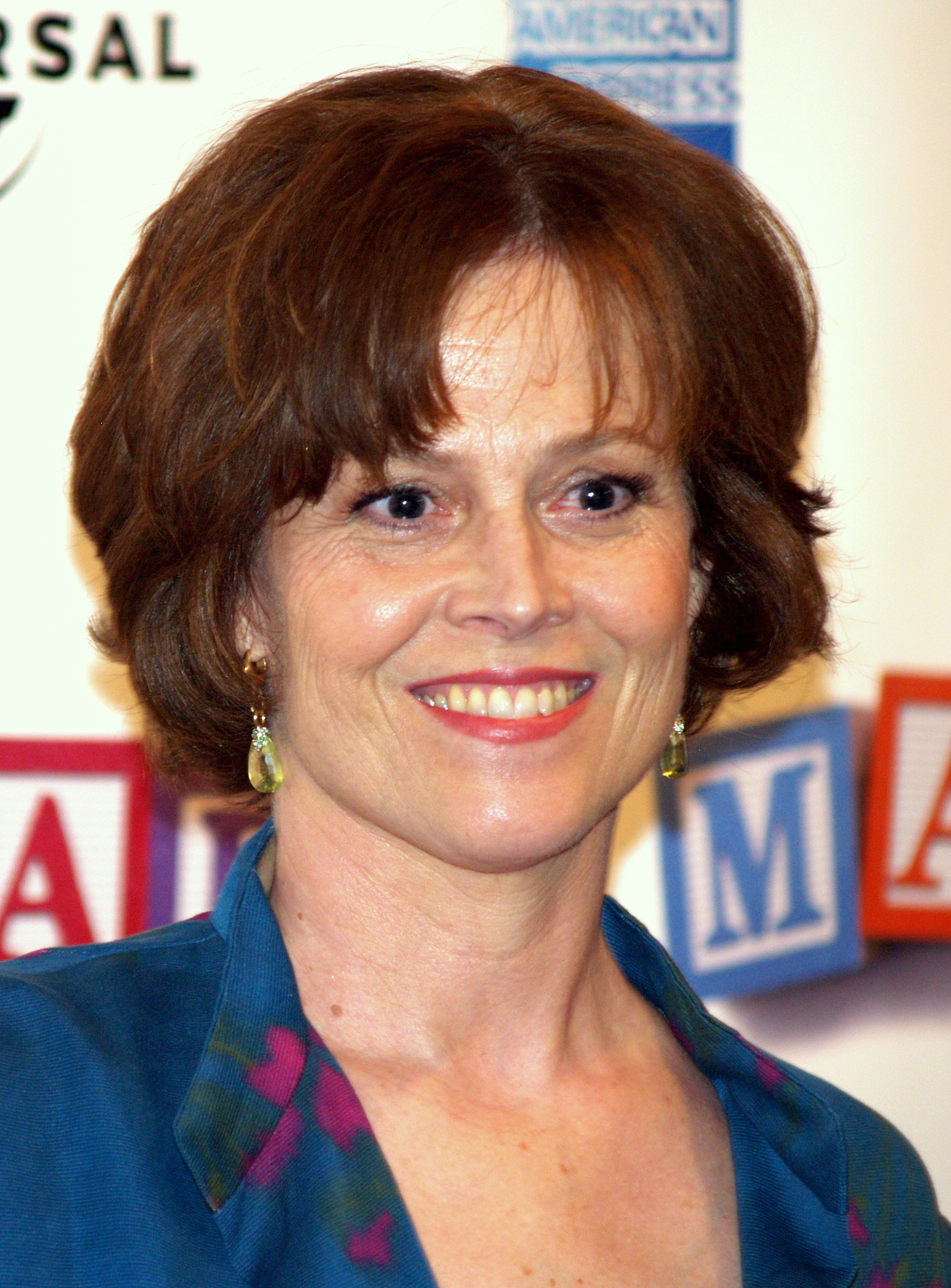
Weaver at the 2008 Tribeca Film Festival

In 2001, Weaver appeared in the comedy Heartbreakers playing the lead role of a con-artist alongside Jennifer Love Hewitt, Ray Liotta, Jason Lee, Gene Hackman and Anne Bancroft. She was included on Channel 4's "100 Greatest Movie Stars" in 2003. She appeared in several films throughout the decade including Holes (2003), the M. Night Shyamalan horror film The Village (2004), Vantage Point (2008), and Baby Mama (2008).

In February 2002, she featured as a guest role in the Futurama episode "Love and Rocket", playing the female Planet Express Ship. In 2006, she was the narrator for the American version of the BBC Emmy Award-winning documentary series Planet Earth; the original British series version was narrated by David Attenborough. In 2007, Weaver returned to Rwanda for the BBC special Gorillas Revisited, in which Weaver reunites with the Rwandan apes from the film Gorillas in the Mist, some twenty years later.

In 2008, Weaver was featured as the voice of the ship's computer in the Pixar and Disney film WALL•E. Also in 2008, she voiced a narrating role in the animated film The Tale of Despereaux (2008), based on the novel by Kate DiCamillo. The film opens with Weaver as narrator recounting the story of the pastel-hued Kingdom of Dor. She also made a rare guest appearance on television, playing herself in season two premiere episode of the television series Eli Stone in 2008.

In 2009, Weaver starred as Mary Griffith in her first television film Prayers for Bobby, for which she was nominated for an Emmy Award, Golden Globe Award, and Screen Actors Guild Award. Also in 2009, she reunited with Aliens director James Cameron for his film Avatar, playing a major role as Dr. Grace Augustine, leader of the AVTR (Avatar) program on the film's fictional moon Pandora. It became the highest-grossing film of all time.

=== 2010s: Television focus and Broadway ===
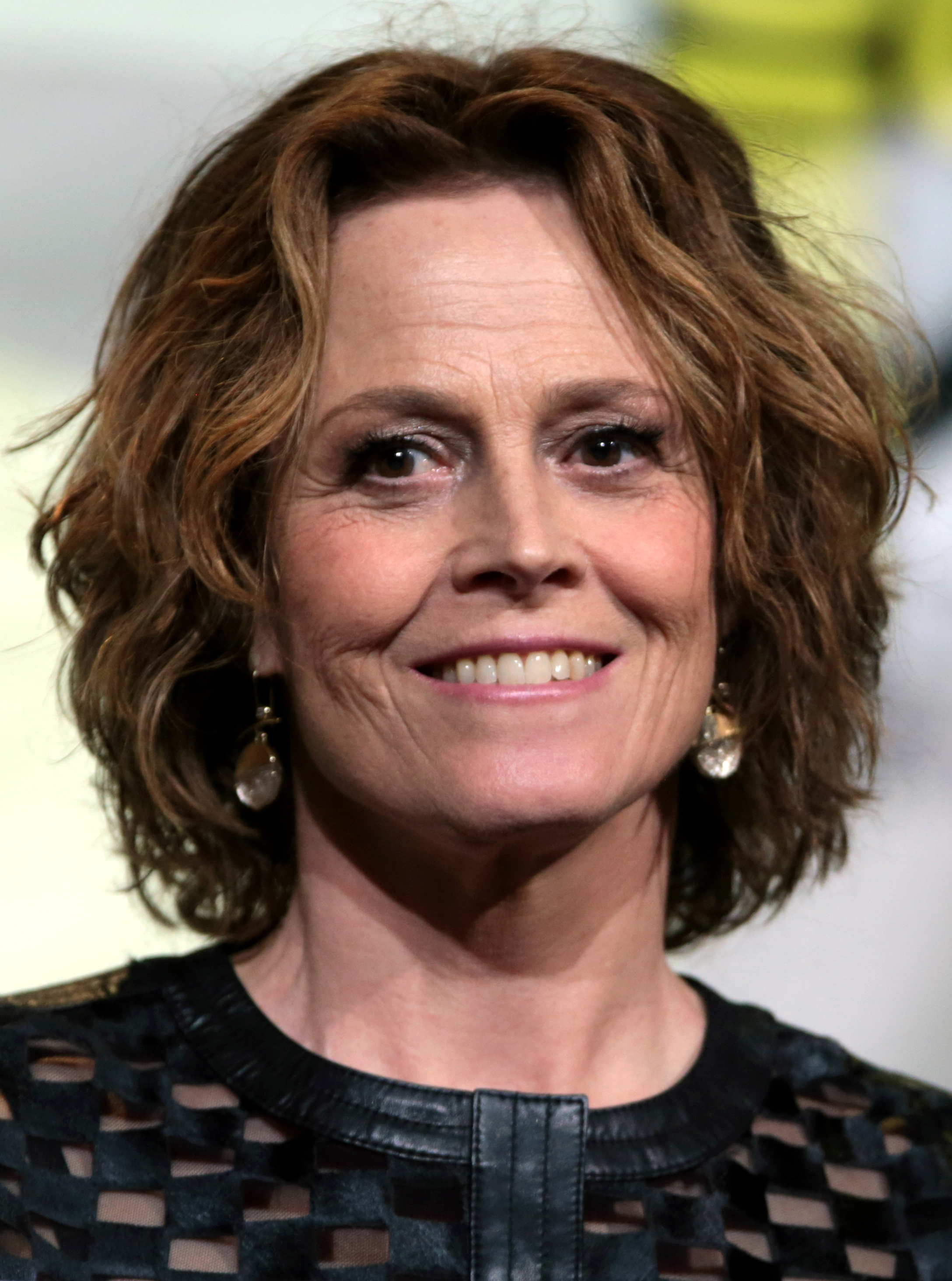
Weaver at the 2016 San Diego Comic-Con

Weaver has hosted two episodes of the long-running NBC sketch show Saturday Night Live: once on the 12th-season premiere in 1986, and again, on a season 35 episode in January 2010. In March 2010, she was cast for the lead role as Queen of the Vampires in Amy Heckerling's Vamps. She was honored at the 2010 Scream Awards earning The Heroine Award which honored her work in science fiction, horror and fantasy films. In December 2013, Weaver was a guest narrator at Disney's Candlelight Processional at Walt Disney World.

In 2012, she took a leading role as Elaine Barrish, the recently divorced Secretary of State and former First Lady and Governor of Illinois who fights various political opponents in the USA Network political miniseries Political Animals acting opposite Carla Gugino, Sebastian Stan, Ciaran Hinds, and Ellen Burstyn. When talking about the character Weaver told The Hollywood Reporter, "She sort of has some superficial resemblance, obviously, to Hillary Clinton but really Elaine has made some decisions that distinguish her from Mrs. Clinton — who we all admire". Critic Brian Lowry of Variety praised its ensemble, specifically Weaver citing her as "representing an inspired choice to portray Elaine, someone brimming with integrity, pain and grit all at once." For her performance she was nominated for the Primetime Emmy Award, Golden Globe Award, Critics' Choice Television Award, and Screen Actors Guild Award.

In 2013, Weaver returned to Broadway in the Christopher Durang play Vanya and Sonia and Masha and Spike (2013) alongside David Hyde Pierce, Kristine Nielsen, and Billy Magnussen at the John Golden Theatre. Charles Isherwood of The New York Times wrote "Ms. Weaver holds her own amid this skilled comic company". Marilyn Stasio of Variety wrote, "Weaver, as funny as you've ever seen her". The production went onto win the Tony Award for Best Play at the 67th Tony Awards.

In 2014, Weaver reprised the role of Ripley for the first time in seventeen years by voicing the character in the video game Alien: Isolation. Her character has a voice cameo in the main story, and has a central role in the two DLCs set during the events of Alien, with most of the original cast voicing their respective characters. Weaver appeared in the film Exodus: Gods and Kings (2014) playing Tuya, directed by Ridley Scott, alongside Christian Bale, Joel Edgerton and Ben Kingsley. In 2015, she co-starred in Neill Blomkamp's science-fiction film Chappie, and stated that she would agree to appear in an Alien sequel, provided that Blomkamp directs.

On February 18, 2015, it was officially announced that an Alien sequel would be made, with Blomkamp slated to direct. On February 25, 2015, Weaver confirmed that she would reprise her role as Ellen Ripley in the new Alien film. However, in a later response to a fan question on Twitter asking what the chances were of his Alien project actually happening, Blomkamp responded "slim". In 2015 and 2017, Weaver played an American tourist in two episodes of the British television series Doc Martin.

In 2016, Weaver voiced herself in a cameo in the Pixar film Finding Dory. That same year, she received the Donostia Award at the San Sebastián International Film Festival. Weaver played Alexandra, the leader of the Hand, in Netflix and Marvel's miniseries The Defenders, released in 2017. On June 7, 2019, Weaver confirmed that she would reprise her role as Dana Barrett in Ghostbusters: Afterlife, which was released on November 19, 2021. On September 23, 2019, Variety reported that Weaver and Kevin Kline were set to reunite again (after Dave and The Ice Storm) for The Good House, a drama from Steven Spielberg's Amblin Partners and Universal Pictures.

=== 2020s: Return to film and West End debut ===
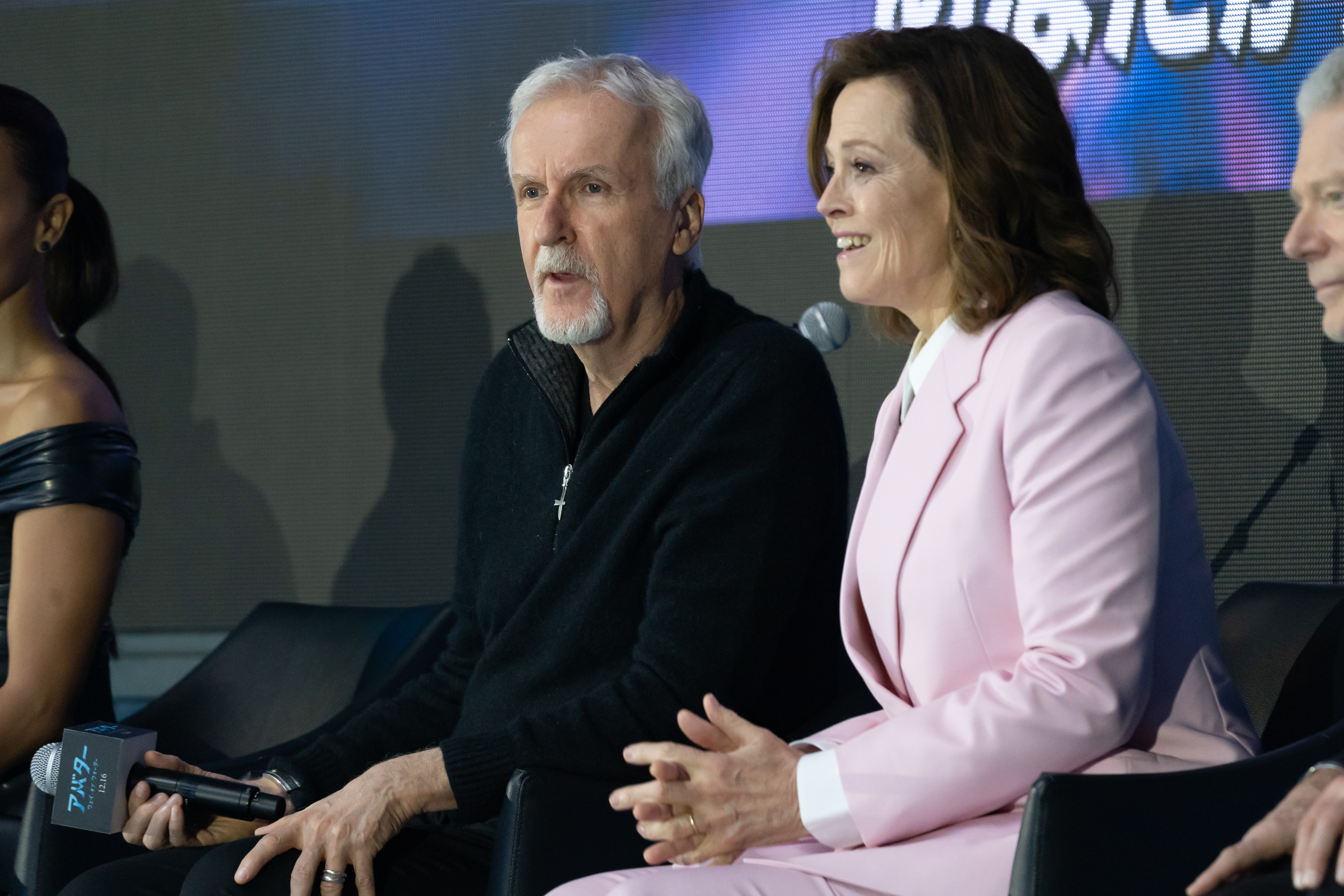
James Cameron with Weaver promoting Avatar: The Way of Water in 2022

In September 2011, it was confirmed that Weaver would be returning to Avatar: The Way of Water, with James Cameron stating that "no one ever dies in science fiction." The Way of Water, alike to its predecessor, was released in December 2022 to critical and commercial success. Principal photography for Avatar: The Way of Water and Avatar: Fire and Ash started simultaneously on September 25, 2017; Weaver portrayed Kiri, Jake and Neytiri's daughter, and reprised her role as Dr. Grace Augustine. The film became the third-highest-grossing film of all time, and it received a nomination for the Academy Award for Best Picture.

In 2023, Weaver starred in and executive-produced the Australian miniseries The Lost Flowers of Alice Hart. Robert Lloyd of the Los Angeles Times wrote: "it's a special treat to see Weaver, who does not overplay her assumed Australian accent, in such a substantial part; if the series seems a little long, one may at least appreciate the greater time it affords us to spend in her company." At the 13th AACTA Awards, Weaver was nominated for Best Lead Actress in a Television Drama.

In 2024, the Academy of Cinematographic Arts and Sciences of Spain awarded her with the International Goya Award for "her impressive career full of unforgettable films and inspiring us by creating complex and strong female characters." She received the Golden Lion for Lifetime Achievement at the 81st Venice International Film Festival, alongside Peter Weir. On May 7, 2024, Weaver returned to the stage reprising her role as Masha in the one night benefit performance of Vanya and Sonia and Masha and Spike alongside David Hyde Pierce, Kristine Nielsen, and Linda Lavin at the Mitzi E. Newhouse Theater in Lincoln Center.

Weaver made her West End debut as Prospero in the revival of the William Shakespeare play The Tempest directed by Jamie Lloyd at the Theatre Royal, Drury Lane. The production ran from December 7, 2024 to February 1, 2025.

She next appeared as New Republic Colonel Ward in the Disney/Star Wars film The Mandalorian and Grogu, released on May 22, 2026.

=== Upcoming projects ===
On January 6, 2026, it was announced that Weaver would be joining the cast of Phoebe Waller-Bridge's Tomb Raider series for Amazon Prime Video in a key role. She will reprise her roles of Dr. Grace Augustine and Kiri in Avatar 4 and Avatar 5. She was set to star in the thriller Useful Idiots alongside Meryl Streep, but announced in May 2026 that the project was not going forward.

== Personal life ==
Weaver has been married to stage director Jim Simpson since October 1, 1984. The two live in the Manhattan borough of New York City, where they founded The Flea Theater together in 1996. They have one child, born in 1990, an author who as of 2024 worked as an adjunct assistant professor of the Digital Storytelling Lab at the Columbia University School of the Arts. In a 2010 interview, Weaver revealed that she underwent therapy to help with the guilt she felt for frequently traveling away from her family for work, stating that "Going to New Zealand to make Avatar when [Shar] was applying to colleges almost killed me". In Simpson's 2002 film adaptation of the play The Guys, he and Shar appear as the husband and child of Weaver's character.

Weaver is close friends with fellow actresses Jamie Lee Curtis and Selina Cadell. In a 2015 interview, Curtis admitted to Weaver that she never saw Alien in its entirety because she was too scared.

=== Activism ===
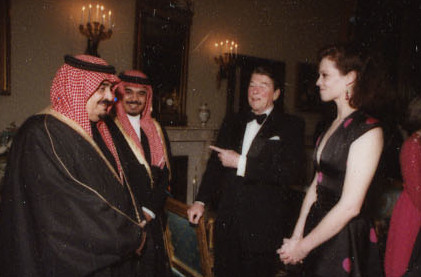
Weaver with Ronald Reagan and Fahd of Saudi Arabia in 1985

After making Gorillas in the Mist, Weaver became a supporter of the Dian Fossey Gorilla Fund, and later became its honorary chairperson. She was honored by the Explorers Club for her work and is considered to be an environmentalist.

In October 2006, Weaver gave a news conference at the start of a United Nations General Assembly policy deliberation where she outlined the threat to ocean habitats posed by deep-sea trawling, an industrial method for catching fish.

On April 8, 2008, in the Rainbow Room, Weaver hosted the annual gala of the Trickle up Program, a non-profit organization focussing on those (mainly women and disabled people) in extreme poverty.

== Acting credits and awards ==
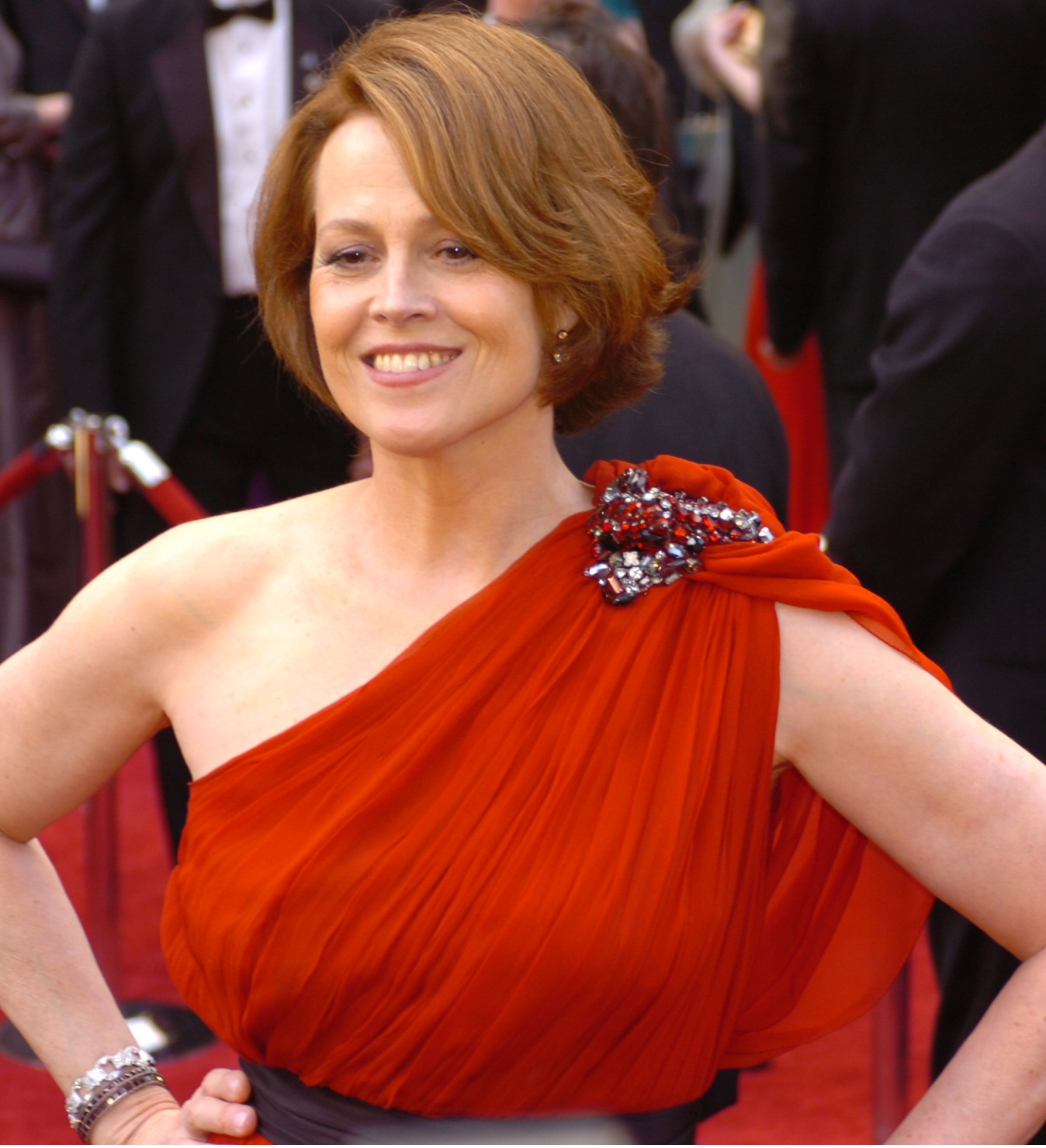
Weaver at the 82nd Academy Awards in 2010

Weaver's most positively-reviewed films, according to the review-aggregation website Rotten Tomatoes and a number of media rankings, include:

- Alien (1979)
- The Year of Living Dangerously (1982)
- Ghostbusters (1984)
- Aliens (1986)
- Gorillas in the Mist (1988)
- Working Girl (1988)
- Alien 3 (1992)
- Dave (1993)
- Death and the Maiden (1994)
- Copycat (1995)
- The Ice Storm (1997)
- Galaxy Quest (1999)
- Heartbreakers (2001)
- Holes (2003)
- Infamous (2006)
- WALL-E (2008)
- Avatar (2009)
- The Cabin in the Woods (2011)
- Cedar Rapids (2011)
- A Monster Calls (2016)
- Finding Dory (2016)
- Call Jane (2022)
- Avatar: The Way of Water (2022)
- Dust Bunny (2025)
- Avatar: Fire and Ash (2025)

Weaver has received three Academy Award nominations, three BAFTA nominations, seven Golden Globe Award nominations, one Grammy Award nomination, four Primetime Emmy Award nominations, three SAG nominations and a Tony Award nomination. From these, she has won a BAFTA, a Grammy Award, and two Golden Globe Awards. In addition, she has received a star on the Hollywood Walk of Fame, the International Goya Award from the Spanish Film Academy, and the Golden Lion at the Venice Film Festival.
