= The Nature and Purpose of the Universe =

The Nature and Purpose of the Universe is a play written by Christopher Durang, first produced in 1975 at Direct Theatre directed by Allen B. Belknap. The cast featured Justin Rashid, Lynnie Godfrey, James Nesbit Clark, Anne DeSalvo, David Wilborn, Nick Hardin Mariano and Lars Kampmann. The work is an absurdist comedy concerning the irony of Catholic dogma, a theme visited in other Durang plays, including Sister Mary Ignatius Explains It All For You, Laughing Wild, and The Marriage of Bette and Boo. Nature and Purpose deals primarily with an unhappy housewife's religious faith being tested by nightmarish circumstances which church dogma teaches she must willingly endure.

== Productions ==
The Nature and Purpose of the Universe was produced by the Direct Theatre at the Wonder Horse Theatre, New York, on February 21, 1979. Directed by Allen B. Belknap, the cast featured Ellen Greene as Eleanor Mann, Tom Bade as Steve Mann, Ethan Phillips as Donald Mann, Chris Ceraso as Gary Mann, and Eric Weitz as Andy Mann.

== Plot ==
Two "agents of God" explain the nature and purpose of the universe to the audience, using the Mann family of suburban New Jersey for illustration. At the center of the story is Eleanor, a sweet, sad housewife horribly treated by her husband Steve and most every other character in the play, most of whom are actually the "agents of God" in disguise. Eleanor's oldest son Donald is a drug addict, a dealer, and a pimp, middle son Gary an angry homosexual, and youngest son Andy has lost his penis in a reaper accident.

When it seems to Eleanor that there isn't any hope for escape from her miserable existence, a door-to-door brush salesman professes his love for her and promises he'll return to carry her away forever; however, the salesman is actually one of the agents of God once again testing Eleanor's threshold for misery. After numerous trials and tribulations (including a sadistic rape) the revelation that the brush salesman was lying, and a Papal assassination, the family finds itself exiled in Iceland, where it appears Eleanor's nightmare will only continue.
