= Christopher Durang =

American playwright (1949–2024)

- Born: Christopher Ferdinand Durang; January 2, 1949; Montclair, New Jersey, U.S.
- Died: April 2, 2024 (aged 75); Pipersville, Pennsylvania, U.S.
- Education: Harvard University (BA); Yale University (MFA)
- Occupation: Playwright
- Spouse: John Augustine (m. 2014)
- Writing career
- Period: 1974–2018
- Website: www.christopherdurang.com

Christopher Ferdinand Durang (January 2, 1949 – April 2, 2024) was an American playwright known for works of outrageous and often absurd comedy. His work was especially popular in the 1980s, though his career seemed to get a second wind in the late 1990s.

Sister Mary Ignatius Explains It All For You was Durang's watershed play as it brought him to national prominence when it won him the Obie Award for Best Playwright (1980). His play Vanya and Sonia and Masha and Spike won the Tony Award for Best Play in 2013. The production was directed by Nicholas Martin, and featured Sigourney Weaver, David Hyde Pierce, Kristine Nielsen, Billy Magnussen, Shalita Grant and Genevieve Angelson. Durang was a co-director of the Lila Acheson Wallace American Playwrights Program at Juilliard.

== Early life and education ==
Durang was born on January 2, 1949, in Montclair, New Jersey, the son of two WWII veterans, architect Francis Ferdinand Durang Jr. and Patricia Elizabeth Durang (née Mansfield), a secretary. He grew up in Berkeley Heights, New Jersey, and attended Catholic schools: Our Lady of Peace School (New Providence) and Delbarton (Morristown). He received a B.A. in English from Harvard College and an M.F.A. in playwriting from Yale School of Drama.

== Work ==
His work often deals critically with issues of child abuse, Roman Catholic dogma, culture, and homosexuality. Ben Brantley summarized key themes from Durang's plays in a review written in 1994: 1) narcissism; 2) fear of engagement with a danger-filled world; 3) the strangulating nature of family ties; 4) sexual disorientation and the tenuousness of individual identity. To this list the abusive power of authority figures could be added.

While Durang's use of parody and his criticism of many social institutions might appear overly cynical at times, he stated:

... when I say everyone is crazy that means it's a very bad day where the amount of crazy people in the world has spread out to the entire universe and it doesn't seem possible to cope with anything... I think we're all neurotic. And I do think relationships are certainly difficult. Nonetheless, those lines in the play do get a laugh, so there's something. It's not as despairing as it sounds, but I don't not believe it.

Much of Durang's style can be attributed to the aesthetic of black comedy, a humor style that offers a fatalistic view of life. Durang discussed the particular frame of mind that requires the viewer to distance himself from the horrific episode of human suffering and pain; he explained:

I exaggerate awful things further, and then I present it in a way that is funny, and for those of us who find it funny, it has to do with a very clear suspension of disbelief. It is a play, after all, with acted characters; it allows us a distance we couldn’t have in reality. To me this distance allows me to find some rather serious topics funny.

Durang suggested that his form of humor requires a double-consciousness, an ability to register scenes of cruelty or pain, while simultaneously comprehending the humor. He credited Arthur Kopit's “tragicfarce” Oh Dad, Poor Dad, Mamma's Hung You in the Closet and I'm Feelin' So Sad as an early influence on his creative vision, a black comedy in which a woman totes her dead husband's corpse on vacation with her. Humor is one way of resolving conflict and anxiety, and black comedy goes a step further to relieve tension regarding subjects that are typically difficult to think about, such as death, family dysfunction, or torture.

His plays have been performed nationwide, including on Broadway and Off-Broadway. His works include those in the bibliography as well as a collection of one-act parodies meant to be performed in one evening entitled Durang/Durang that includes "Mrs. Sorken", "For Whom The Southern Belle Tolls" (a parody of The Glass Menagerie by Tennessee Williams), "A Stye of the Eye", "Nina in the Morning", "Wanda's Visit", and "Business Lunch at the Russian Tea Room".

Together with Marsha Norman, Durang directed The Lila Acheson Wallace American Playwrights Program at the Juilliard School from 1984 to 2016, teaching playwrights Joshua Harmon and Noah Haidle, as well as Pulitzer-Prize winning David Lindsay-Abaire, who succeeded Durang as co-director.

Durang performed as an actor for both stage and screen. He first came to prominence in his Off-Broadway satirical review Das Lusitania Songspiel, which he performed with friend and fellow Yale alum Sigourney Weaver. Later he co-starred in one of his own plays as Matt in The Marriage of Bette and Boo, as well as Man in the original production of Laughing Wild.

=== In film ===
Durang denounced the Robert Altman 1987 film adaptation of Beyond Therapy, calling it "horrific". He accused Altman of totally rewriting the script "so that all psychology is thrown out the window, and the characters dash around acting crazy but with literally no behavioral logic underneath."

Durang appeared as an actor in the 1987 comedy The Secret of My Success, 1988's Mr. North, 1989's Penn & Teller Get Killed, 1990's In the Spirit, 1992's Housesitter, and 1994's The Cowboy Way.

Durang wrote a number of unproduced screenplays, including The Nun Who Shot Liberty Valance, The House of Husbands (which he co-authored with Wendy Wasserstein), and The Adventures of Lola.

=== On television ===
Wanda's Visit, one of the six one-acts in Durang/Durang, was originally written for the PBS series Trying Times. Durang played the part of The Waiter in that production.

Durang appeared as himself on the October 11, 1986 episode of Saturday Night Live, hosted by his longtime friend Sigourney Weaver. In the episode, Durang and Weaver parodied the works of Bertolt Brecht, and both were interviewed in the debut of the recurring sketch Church Chat, with Durang as himself.

Durang's 1987 sketch "The Funeral", written for a televised Carol Burnett special, features a grieving widow (Burnett) who is disturbed at her husband's wake by an eccentric mourner, played by Robin Williams.

== Personal life and death ==
Durang lived in Pipersville, Pennsylvania, with his husband, actor/playwright John Augustine. They began their relationship in 1986 and were legally married in 2014.

Durang was at first reluctant to discuss his sexuality publicly, concerned that he would be diminished by the label "gay playwright." But in 1988, he told The Advocate that he felt the need to be more public about his gay identity given the intense homophobia surrounding the AIDS crisis and the Supreme Court's decision in Bowers v. Hardwick.

In 2016, Durang was diagnosed with logopenic progressive aphasia, which is thought to be caused by a form of Alzheimer's disease; as with all forms of aphasia, it primarily impeded his ability to process language, though it subsequently affected his short-term memory. Durang gradually withdrew from public life before his condition was publicly announced in 2022.

Durang died from complications of aphasia at his Pennsylvania home on April 2, 2024, at the age of 75.

== Bibliography ==
Plays

- 1974: The Idiots Karamazov
- 1974: Titanic
- 1975: Death Comes To Us All, Mary Agnes
- 1975: The Nature and Purpose of the Universe
- 1976: The Vietnamization of New Jersey
- 1978: 'Dentity Crisis
- 1979: Sister Mary Ignatius Explains It All For You
- 1981: Beyond Therapy
- 1981: The Actor's Nightmare
- 1983: Baby with the Bathwater
- 1985: The Marriage of Bette and Boo
- 1987: Laughing Wild
- 1988: Naomi in the Living Room
- 1994: For Whom the Southern Belle Tolls
- 1996: Sex and Longing
- 1999: Betty's Summer Vacation
- 2005: Miss Witherspoon
- 2009: Why Torture is Wrong, and the People Who Love Them
- 2012: Vanya and Sonia and Masha and Spike
- 2018: Turning Off the Morning News

Musicals

- 1978: A History of the American Film
- 1979: Das Lusitania Songspiel
- 2002: Mrs. Bob Cratchit's Wild Christmas Binge
- 2007: Adrift in Macao

== Awards and honors ==
Durang received Obie Awards for Sister Mary Ignatius, The Marriage of Bette and Boo and Betty's Summer Vacation. He received a nomination for a Tony Award for Best Book of a Musical for A History of the American Film, and he won a Tony Award for Best Play in 2013 for his play Vanya and Sonia and Masha and Spike.

Durang was awarded numerous fellowships and high-profile grants including a Guggenheim, a Rockefeller Foundation, the CBS Playwriting Fellowship, the Lecomte du Nouy Foundation grant, and the Kenyon Festival Theatre Playwriting Prize.

Durang was a member of the council for the Dramatists Guild of America, and was named the 2024 recipient of the guild's lifetime achievement award. He was also a finalist for the Pulitzer Prize in Drama in 2006 for Miss Witherspoon.

On May 17, 2010, he was presented with the very first Luminary Award from the New York Innovative Theatre Awards for his work Off-Off-Broadway.

Durang was awarded the PEN/Laura Pels International Foundation for Theater Award in 2012. That same year, he was inducted into the American Theater Hall of Fame.
