= The River's End (novel) =

1919 novel by James Oliver Curwood

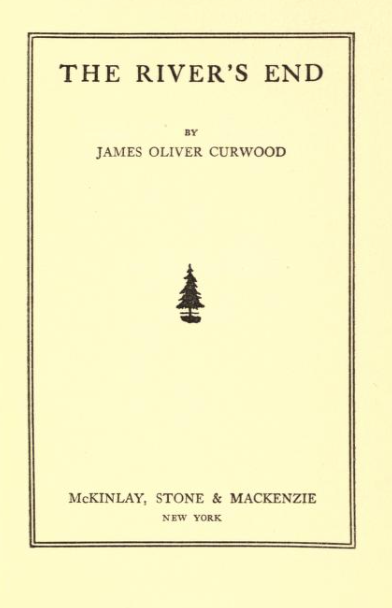
- Title page for The River's End (1919)
- Author: James Oliver Curwood
- Language: English
- Genre: Western
- Publication date: 1919
- Publication place: United States
- Media type: Print

The River's End is a 1919 western novel by the American writer James Oliver Curwood. A Mountie pursues an escaped convict, but later attempts to clear his name.

== Adaptations ==
The novel has been turned into three films, a 1920 silent film The River's End, a 1930 sound film River's End and a 1940 film River's End.

== Bibliography ==
- Pitts, Michael R. Western Movies: A Guide to 5,105 Feature Films. McFarland, 2012.
