= Hurlyburly =

1984 play by American playwright David Rabe

- Theatrical poster for a 2007 production
- Original language: English
- Written by: David Rabe
- Genre: Dark comedy
- Setting: Hollywood

Premiere
- Date: 1984
- Place: Goodman Theatre; Chicago, Illinois

Hurlyburly is a dark comedy play by David Rabe, first staged in 1984. The title refers to dialogue from Shakespeare's Macbeth.

== Plot ==
Hurlyburly depicts the intersecting lives of several low-to-mid-level Hollywood players in the 1980s. Fueled by large quantities of drugs, they attempt to find meaning in their isolated, empty lives.

== Title origin ==
The title (meaning "noisy confusion" or "tumult") is derived from dialogue in Act I, Scene I of Shakespeare's Macbeth:

- First Witch: "When shall we three meet again / In thunder, lightning, or in rain?"
- Second Witch: "When the hurlyburly's done, / When the battle's lost and won."

== Notable casts ==
| Character | Broadway debut (1984) | Broadway replacements (1985) | Film Adaptation (1998) | Off-Broadway revival (2005) |
|---|---|---|---|---|
| Eddie | William Hurt | Frank Langella | Sean Penn | Ethan Hawke |
| Darlene | Sigourney Weaver | Candice Bergen | Robin Wright | Parker Posey |
| Bonnie | Judith Ivey | Christine Baranski | Meg Ryan | Catherine Kellner |
| Donna | Cynthia Nixon | Lauren Tom | Anna Paquin | Halley Gross |
| Phil | Harvey Keitel | Danny Aiello | Chazz Palminteri | Bobby Cannavale |
| Mickey | Ron Silver | Christopher Walken | Kevin Spacey | Josh Hamilton |
| Artie | Jerry Stiller | Kevin Spacey | Garry Shandling | Wallace Shawn |

== Production history ==
The play's first staging was produced by the Goodman Theatre in Chicago. It opened Off-Broadway at Manhattan's Promenade Theatre in June 1984. The Broadway production, directed by Mike Nichols, opened on August 7, 1984 at the Ethel Barrymore Theatre, where it ran for 343 performances. The original cast included William Hurt, Christopher Walken, Harvey Keitel, Jerry Stiller, Judith Ivey, Sigourney Weaver, and Cynthia Nixon.

Nixon was performing in The Real Thing at the same time. (The timing of her entrance and exit in each play allowed her to run back and forth between the two theatres, located two blocks from each other.) Replacements later in the run included Danny Aiello, Susan Anton, Christine Baranski, Frank Langella, Ron Silver, John Rubinstein and Candice Bergen.

In 1997, a version opened in the West End at the Old Vic, starring Daniel Craig, Rupert Graves, Andy Serkis, David Tennant, Jenny Seagrove, and Susannah Doyle.

A 2005 Off-Broadway revival was produced by The New Group, and starred Ethan Hawke, Josh Hamilton, Bobby Cannavale, Parker Posey, Wallace Shawn, Halley Wegryn Gross, and Catherine Kellner. Elizabeth Berkley took over from Catherine Kellner and received much praise, with Charles Isherwood of The New York Times even going as far as apologizing to her for his past criticisms of her ability, stating that the fact she held "her own among this skilled company of scene-stealers is a testament to how much her talent has grown". The production received critical acclaim and garnered a Drama Desk Award nomination for Outstanding Revival of a Play.

== Awards and nominations ==
=== Original Broadway production ===
| Year | Award | Category | Nominated work | Result | Ref. |
|---|---|---|---|---|---|
| 1985 | Tony Awards | Tony Award for Best Play | David Rabe | Nominated | |
| 1985 | Tony Awards | Best Featured Actor in a Play | William Hurt | Nominated | |
| 1985 | Tony Awards | Best Featured Actress in a Play | Judith Ivey | Won | |
| 1985 | Tony Awards | Best Featured Actress in a Play | Sigourney Weaver | Nominated | |
| 1985 | Drama Desk Award | Outstanding Featured Actress in a Play | Judith Ivey | Won | |

=== 2005 Off-Broadway revival ===
| Year | Award | Category | Nominated work | Result | Ref. |
|---|---|---|---|---|---|
| 2005 | Drama Desk Award | Outstanding Revival of a Play | | Nominated | |
| 2005 | Lucille Lortel Award | Outstanding Revival | | Nominated | |

== Film adaptation ==
Rabe wrote the screenplay for a 1998 film version directed by Anthony Drazan. He condensed the action into two hours and updated the setting from the mid-1980s to the late 1990s. The cast included Sean Penn, Kevin Spacey, Chazz Palminteri, Robin Wright Penn, Garry Shandling, Anna Paquin, and Meg Ryan. Penn's performance won him the Volpi Cup and Drazan was nominated for the Golden Lion at the Venice Film Festival. Penn also was nominated Best Male Lead at the Independent Spirit Awards.
