= The River's End (film) =

1920 film

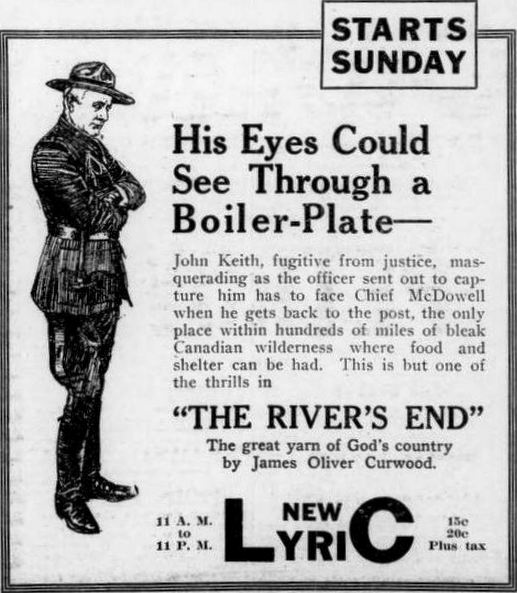
- Newspaper advertisement
- Directed by: Victor Heerman; Marshall Neilan
- Written by: Marion Fairfax
- Based on: The River's End; 1919 novel by James Oliver Curwood
- Produced by: Marshall Neilan
- Starring: Lewis Stone; Marjorie Daw; Jane Novak
- Cinematography: Henry Cronjager; Sam Landers
- Production company: Marshall Neilan Productions
- Distributed by: First National Exhibitors' Circuit
- Release date: February 22, 1920
- Running time: 60 minutes
- Country: United States
- Languages: Silent; English intertitles

The River's End is a 1920 American silent Western drama film directed by Victor Heerman and Marshall Neilan and starring Lewis Stone, Marjorie Daw, and Jane Novak. It is an adaptation of the 1919 novel of the same name by James Oliver Curwood. A print of The River's End exists in The Cinema Museum film archive.

The film's sets were designed by the art director Ben Carré.

== Cast ==
- Lewis Stone as Derwent Conniston/John Keith
- Marjorie Daw as Mary Josephine
- Jane Novak as Miriam Kirkstone
- J. Barney Sherry as McDowell
- George Nichols as Judge Kirkstone
- Charles West as Peter Kirkstone
- Togo Yamamoto as Shan Tung

== Bibliography ==
- Goble, Alan. The Complete Index to Literary Sources in Film. Walter de Gruyter, 1999.
