= Play It Again, Dick =

2014 American web series

- Genre: Meta humor Comedy
- Created by: Rob Thomas
- Written by: Rob Thomas; Bob Dearden
- Directed by: Viet Nguyen
- Starring: Ryan Hansen; Kyle Gallner; Kristen Bell; Robert Buckley; Francis Capra; Enrico Colantoni; Jason Dohring; Christopher B. Duncan
- Country of origin: United States
- Original language: English
- No. of seasons: 1
- No. of episodes: 8

Production
- Executive producers: Rob Thomas; Danielle Stokdyk
- Producer: Ryan Hansen
- Running time: 8–12 minutes
- Production companies: Blue Ribbon Content; Spondoolie Productions

Original release
- Network: CW Seed
- Release: September 16 – November 4, 2014

Related
- Veronica Mars

Play It Again, Dick is an American meta comedy streaming television series that was released on The CW's online platform, CW Seed, on September 16, 2014. It functions as a short spin-off series of the teen noir show Veronica Mars, which originally aired between 2004 and 2007; the show contains appearances by most of the original starring cast. The series follows a fictionalized version of Ryan Hansen as he attempts to convince his Veronica Mars cast-mates to participate in a spin-off centered around his character, Dick Casablancas. The series was created and executive produced by Rob Thomas, produced by Danielle Stokdyk and Ryan Hansen, written by Thomas and Bob Dearden, and directed by Viet Nguyen.

The idea for the web series originated from Blue Ribbon Content, the digital division of Warner Bros. in response to the ongoing development of the film adaptation of Veronica Mars. Thomas was initially reluctant to participate, but he agreed to when the network offered to lighten his workload. The series was announced to the public in January 2014 and released in September of the same year. Most of the original cast of Veronica Mars returned for Play It Again, Dick. Upon release, the series received generally mixed reviews from television critics. Five years after the series was released, Veronica Mars was renewed for a fourth and final season on Hulu.

== Production ==
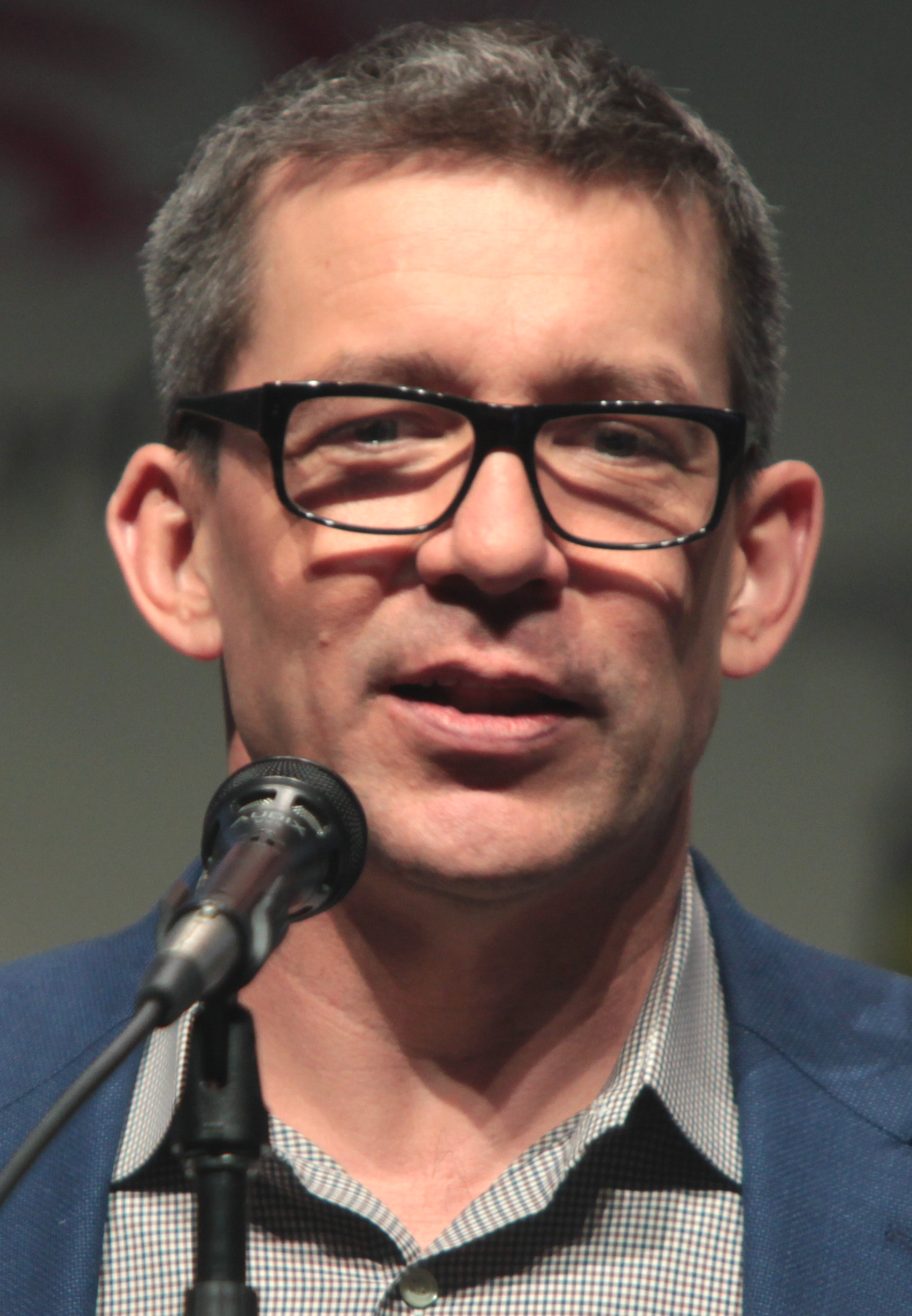
Veronica Mars creator Rob Thomas was initially reluctant to participate.

The origin of the series was connected to the production and release of the film adaptation of Veronica Mars. The digital division of Warner Bros. initially approached Hansen with the idea of a Dick-centered series, intended to promote the film. Most of the original starring cast responded to the concept agreeably and decided to participate. The CW was open to the premise for the series. However, Thomas was reluctant to be involved in the project, as he was engaged in other pursuits, including the Veronica Mars film and several television pilots. Because he almost did not agree to produce the project, it was almost cancelled; the network brought in several of Thomas's acquaintances to write and direct in order to lighten the creator's workload.

Thomas thought that the filming would be a casual affair. He stated in an interview, "I honestly thought we would do it in a day and it would be like Ryan Hansen's sitting on a couch playing Xbox and you just rotate the other five or six cast members and it would just be them chatting, like three or four minutes of funny chatting on a couch. When I said yes, that's what I imagined. When I showed up at the first production meeting and they had given us so much more money and they had such higher expectations." The filming schedule for the entire series lasted for eight days at the beginning of August 2014, with Hansen recalling that the cast and crew shot 14 script pages a day. On returning to the character of Dick, Hansen said, "Once you play Dick, he develops inside of you."

The CW announced the decision to produce a Veronica Mars spinoff on January 15, 2014, although its release date was unclear at that point. Network executive Mark Pedowitz noted that a premise had not been decided upon at that point and that "[Thomas] talked about potential people being involved, but he didn't commit to anybody." When asked for a brief description of the series by Alan Sepinwall, Thomas responded:

The web series will have more in common with Party Down tonally, but it will be about Ryan Hansen, or at least a version of Ryan Hansen, deciding to capitalize on the current 'Veronica Mars' heat to get his own series on the air. He'll try to pull his actor pals into the venture with varying degrees of success.

To play the role of Duncan Kane, Thomas tried to contact original actor Teddy Dunn, who had left acting to become a lawyer. Dunn was initially open to appearing in the series, stating "I would have actually liked to have done it, see everybody and catch up and have some fun." He did not specify why he refused the offer but also said that he was very hesitant to return to the role in any canonical appearance. The role was later given to Ryan Devlin who had previously appeared on the show.

An official press release about Play It Again, Dick and the network's other upcoming digital series was disseminated on May 5, 2014; it included a short synopsis of the show and set a vague release date of "later this summer". According to one news outlet, the press release showed the fledgling series' capacity for self-referential humor and numerous celebrity guest appearances. A 20-second teaser trailer for the first episode was released on YouTube on September 8. A longer trailer was distributed on September 12, which featured an extended parody of the marketing campaign for The Newsroom.

== Cast ==
On August 12, 2014, the website BuzzFeed presented a cast list for the series, which included a variety of Veronica Mars cast members. According to the report, several former Veronica Mars cast members would return as both their characters and themselves, including Kristen Bell, Jason Dohring, Enrico Colantoni, Percy Daggs III, Daran Norris, Francis Capra, Kyle Gallner, and Christopher B. Duncan. Chris Lowell, Ken Marino, Amanda Noret, and Lisa Thornhill all appeared in the original series but portrayed only themselves or their characters in Play It Again, Dick. In addition, Robert Buckley and Rose McIver, two members of the main cast of iZombie, Thomas's new series, portrayed characters in the web series. In addition, Ryan Devlin, who had previously acted as rapist Mercer Hayes in the show's third season, portrayed himself and Duncan Kane in the web series. Slate noted that one notable absence from the cast list was Tina Majorino, who portrayed series regular Cindy "Mac" Mackenzie.

== Reception ==
Although the CW Seed does not release viewing figures for episodes, Pedowitz stated that the pilot episode's premiere was the best ever for the network ratings-wise.

The review aggregator Metacritic does not currently have an average score but lists two reviews, both of which it considers to be mixed. Mike Hale of The New York Times thought that the difference in tone between Veronica Mars and Play It Again, Dick was the most interesting aspect about the web series, writing that it had a "broader, coarser, self-mocking style". Giving his overall opinion on the series, the reviewer opined, "For a short-form digital series, 'Play It Again, Dick' is fairly amusing." However, he found that Thomas and the cast often used the series as a means of self-promotion. In an article for TV.com, Kaitlin Thomas gave the first episode a very positive review, writing that it "does not disappoint." She thought that small details and jokes were the core of the series but that one should experience these firsthand. She concluded, "the idea of Dick-centric series shouldn't work, but ultimately does."

Flavorwire gave the series a mixed-to-positive review. The reviewer stated, "It's an odd little web series, not just because of its mere existence, but because it doesn't exactly have an interesting narrative, nor does it have anything to add to the Veronica Mars universe. Despite all that, the first two episodes manage to fully entertain." Although the reviewer criticized the series as relatively directionless and pointless, he thought that it would satisfy fans of the original series through its in-jokes. Miriam Krule of Slate thought that the plot of the series was thin and did not live up to its parent series. "So yes, the plot is sparse and the jokes are old, but, honestly, if you're watching this Samsung ad disguised as a Web series, you don't really care about the plot." Esther Zuckerman of Entertainment Weekly thought that the show would be best suited to those who liked the Veronica Mars cast, not the show itself. The reviewer also criticized the tone of the series, writing, "For a show that's attempting to skewer Hollywood egos, there's something just a tad egomaniacal about the whole enterprise. [...] it lacks the bite of [Party Down], which was realistic in its depiction of the inherent disappointment involved in pursuing a career in Hollywood."

== Episodes ==
No.	Title	Directed by	Written by	Original release date
1	"Episode One"	Viet Nguyen	Rob Thomas & Bob Dearden	September 16, 2014
Ryan Hansen invites Kristen Bell over to his house, where he tells her of his Veronica Mars spinoff about Dick as a private investigator. Bell thinks that the premise is ridiculous and would not work well. She eventually reluctantly acquiesces to her friend because she believes that the show will never be greenlit. However, when Hansen presents his premise to CW executives, he receives $50,000 to film a pilot. Bell and Hansen discuss potential ideas for subsequent episodes of the show, including a musical episode.
2	"Episode Two"	Viet Nguyen	Rob Thomas & Bob Dearden	September 23, 2014
In a fictional interview for the CW, Rob Thomas denies knowledge of the spinoff series. Hansen pitches his idea to Jason Dohring, but as they work out, Dohring presents his own ideas. Hansen pretends to accept Dohring's ideas. Later, he contacts Chris Lowell via video chat, but he vehemently rejects Hansen's offer to star in the series.
3	"Episode Three"	Viet Nguyen	Rob Thomas & Bob Dearden	September 30, 2014
Hansen delivers an extended monologue about his experiences with an exaggerated version of Enrico Colantoni. Later, Colantoni enlists Hansen on a complex and likely illegal mission to deliver a mysterious package to Tom Hanks and states that he cannot enter the US to film. In addition, Hansen is able to secure only three hours of Percy Daggs III's time.
4	"Episode Four"	Viet Nguyen	Rob Thomas & Bob Dearden	October 7, 2014
5	"Episode Five"	Viet Nguyen	Rob Thomas & Bob Dearden	October 14, 2014
6	"Episode Six"	Viet Nguyen	Rob Thomas & Bob Dearden	October 21, 2014
7	"Episode Seven"	Viet Nguyen	Rob Thomas & Bob Dearden	October 28, 2014
8	"Episode Eight"	Viet Nguyen	Rob Thomas & Bob Dearden	November 4, 2014
