= Clear Skies =

Clear Skies may refer to:

- Clear Skies Act of 2003 and 2005 in the United States
- Clear Skies microgeneration programme in the United Kingdom
- Clear Skies (film), a 1961 film by Soviet director Grigori Chukhrai
- Clear Skies (machinima), a machinima series based on the fictional universe of the game Eve Online
- ClearSkies™, an album by PrismCorp Virtual Enterprises
