= Hank Landry =

Hank Landry may refer to:

- Hank Landry (Stargate), in the military science fiction adventure TV series Stargate SG-1, played by Beau Bridges
- Hank Landry (Veronica Mars), in the US teen neo-noir mystery drama TV series Veronica Mars, played by Patrick Fabian
