= Michael Braun (drummer) =

American drummer

Michael Braun is an American musician/songwriter specializing in drums, most recognized as Hall & Oates longest touring drummer (from 1989–2010).

Michael has performed with artists including: Billy Joel, Todd Rundgren, Michael McDonald, Toots & the Maytals, Kenny Loggins, KT Tunstall, Carly Simon, Graham Parker, Peter Frampton, John Waite, Duane Eddy, Rick Wakeman, Peter Allen, Michael Bolton, John Sebastian, Phoebe Snow, Leon Redbone, Chuck Berry, Elliott Murphy, Bo Diddley and Tom Rush.

Michael, who lives in Portland, Oregon, has been playing professionally since the early 1970s. His son Ben Braun, is in the electropop band Mackintosh Braun.
