= Amanda Noret =

American actress

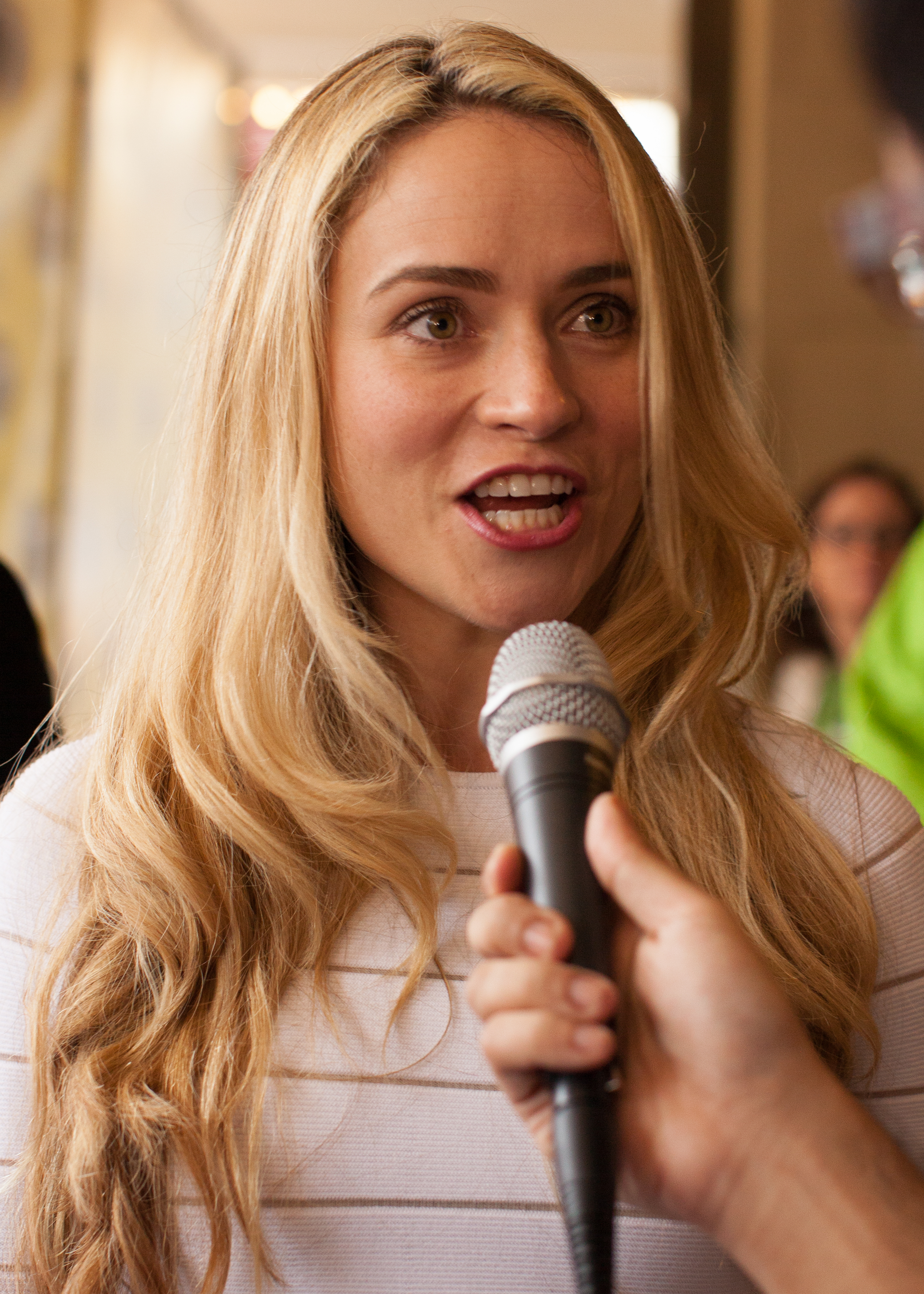
- Noret at SXSW 2014
- Born: U.S.
- Other name: Amanda Ware
- Occupation: Actress
- Years active: 1996–present

Amanda Noret is an American actress, best known for her role as Madison Sinclair in Veronica Mars.

== Filmography ==
| Year | Title | Role | Notes |
|---|---|---|---|
| 1996 | Full Circle | Tana | TV movie |
| 2001 | City Guys | Student | Episode: "Video Killed the Radio Star" |
| 2002 | That '70s Show | Bachelorina #1 | Episode: "Donna Dates a Kelso" |
| 2004 | 7th Heaven | Young Woman | Episode: "Fathers" |
| 2004–2007 | Veronica Mars | Madison Sinclair | 10 episodes |
| 2006 | Gone | Aunt Libby | Short film |
| 2006 | The Insatiable | Cindi | |
| 2007 | Bunny Whipped | Jennifer | |
| 2007 | Jekyll | Co-Ed #2 | |
| 2014 | Veronica Mars | Madison Sinclair | |
| 2014 | Play It Again, Dick | Madison Sinclair | 8 episodes |
| 2017 | She's Out of His Mind | Lil | |
