= Bunny Whipped =

- Directed by: Rafael Riera
- Written by: Rafael Riera
- Produced by: Ty Donaldson
- Starring: Esteban Powell; Joey Lauren Adams; Laz Alonso; Brande Roderick; Rebecca Gayheart
- Cinematography: Bob Brill
- Edited by: Godfrey Pye
- Music by: Jessika Zen
- Release date: April 2007
- Country: United States
- Language: English

Bunny Whipped is a 2007 direct-to-DVD superhero comedy film written and directed by Rafael Riera.

== Plot summary ==
Bob Whipple (Esteban Powell) is a sportswriter stuck in a dead-end job. When he learns of the murder of high-profile white rapper Cracker Jack (Fred Maske), he is inspired to become the vigilante not-so-superhero The Whip. Whipple's high-school girlfriend Anne (Joey Lauren Adams), now an animal-rights activist, reaches out to The Whip to help rescue rabbits, but she is soon kidnapped by Kenny Kent (Laz Alonso), who is also the prime suspect in the rapper's murder. In spite of his complete lack of superpowers, The Whip jumps into action to save Anne and avenge the rapper's death.

== Cast ==
- Esteban Powell as Bob Whipple/The Whip
- Joey Lauren Adams as Anne
- Laz Alonso as Kenny Kent
- Brande Roderick as Casey
- Rebecca Gayheart as Miss Most Awesomely Awesome
- Fred Maske as Cracker Jack
- Pedro Miguel Arce as Security Guard
- Ike Barinholtz as Joe
- Eric Bradley as Additional Voices
- Jake Johnson as Basketball Player
- Amanda Noret as Jennifer

== Reception ==
DVDTalk's David Cornelius referred to the film as "a plotless, plodding comedy made on the cheap". Adam Jones from FILMINK said "With a muddled storyline and appalling character development, one can only hope that writer/director Rafael Riera isn't allowed near a movie camera again!" Other reviewers said "it seemed like a 12 year old spliced it together" and "the filmmaking and acting is shabby and rough at best".
