= Francis Capra =

American actor

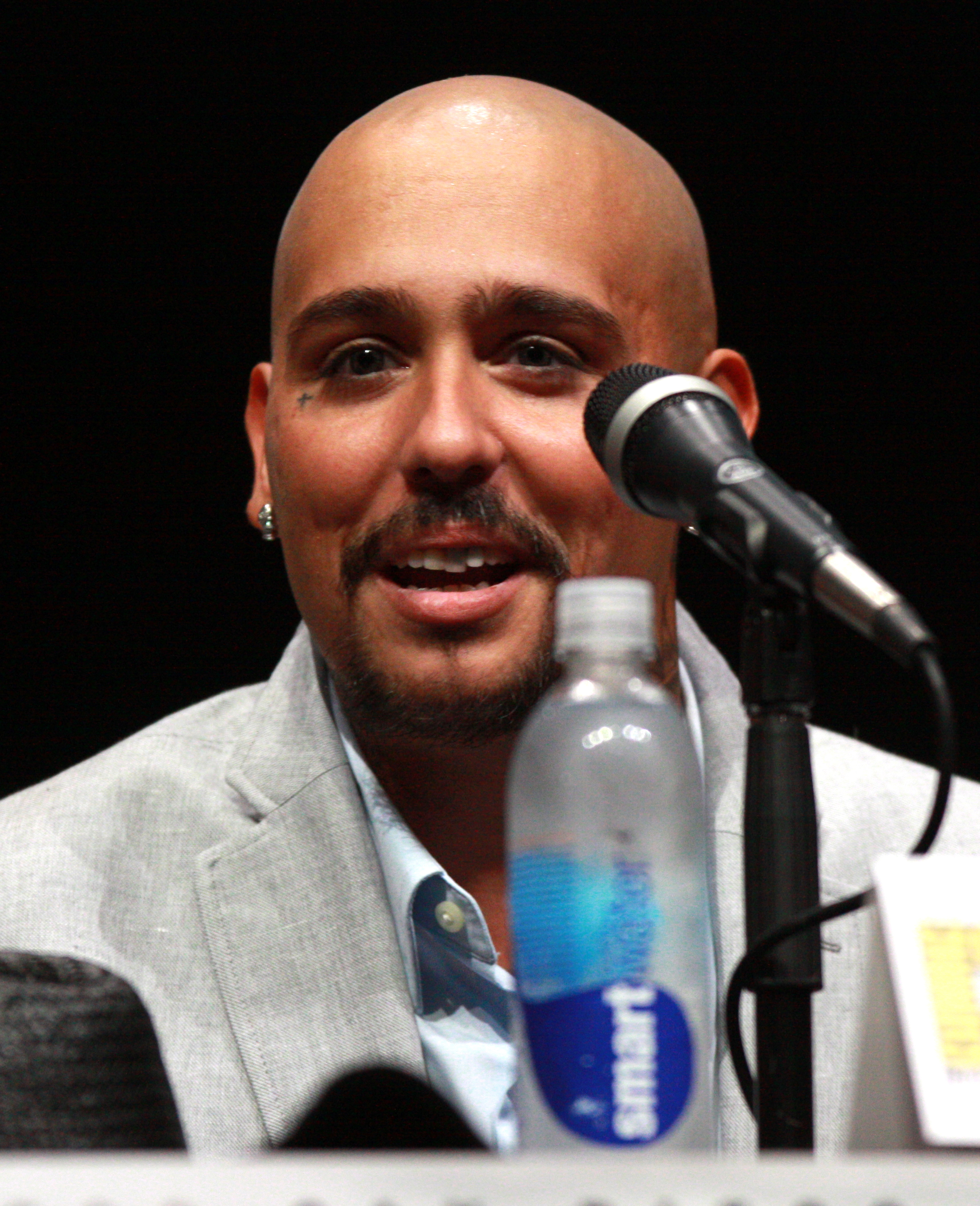
- Capra at San Diego Comic Con in 2013
- Born: April 27, 1983 (age 43); The Bronx, New York City, U.S.
- Occupation: Actor
- Years active: 1993–present

Francis Cordero Capra (born April 27, 1983) is an American actor. He has played the roles of Max Connor in Kazaam and Eli "Weevil" Navarro in the TV series Veronica Mars.

== Early life and education ==
Capra attended Our Lady of the Assumption Catholic School and P.S. 71.

== Career ==
Capra began his acting career in 1993 with A Bronx Tale in which he played the 9-year-old version of the lead character. He played the character of Eli "Weevil" Navarro on the television series Veronica Mars and had a small guest role on The O.C. He appeared on The Closer, Lincoln Heights, Criminal Minds, Friday Night Lights and in the film Crank. Capra starred in Kazaam, A Simple Wish and Free Willy 2: The Adventure Home. He portrayed Jesse Murphy on the television show Heroes.

Capra has a production company called Take Off Productions with actor De'Aundre Bonds.

== Awards and nominations ==
- 1994 – Nominated for a Young Artist Award at the Young Artist Awards for Best Youth Actor Co-Starring in a Motion Picture Drama for A Bronx Tale (1993).

== Filmography ==
=== Film ===
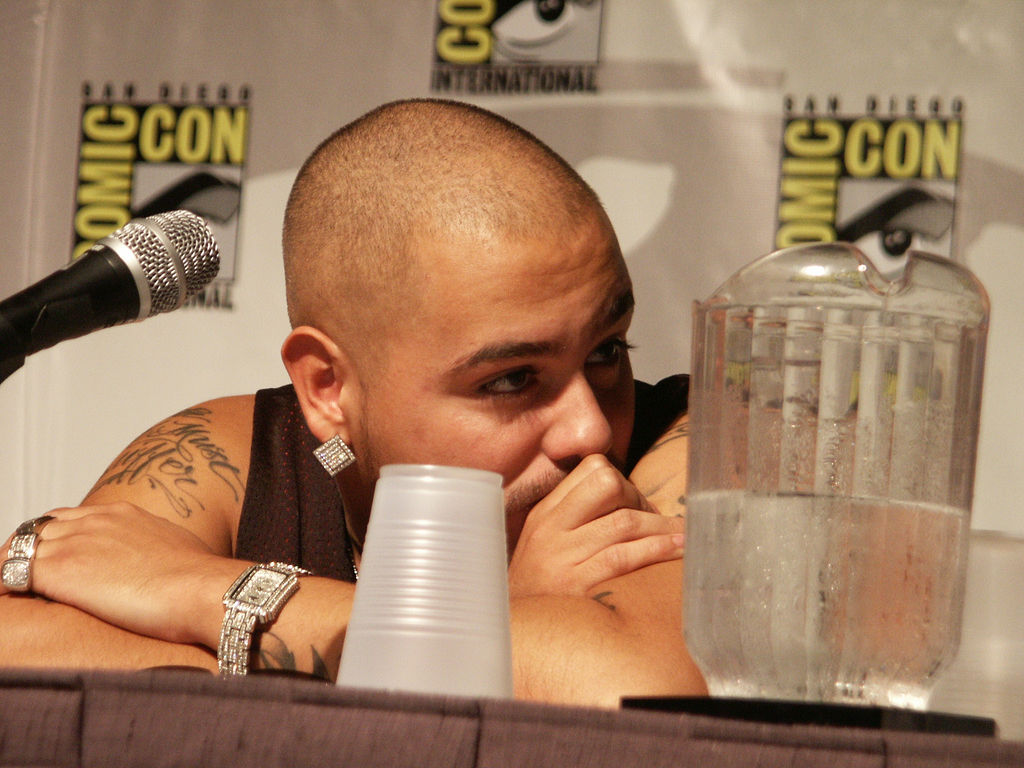
Capra in 2006

Year	Title	Role	Notes
1993	A Bronx Tale	Calogero "C" Anello (age 9)	
1995	Free Willy 2: The Adventure Home	Elvis	
1996	Kazaam	Maxwell "Max" Connor	
1997	A Simple Wish	Charlie Greening	
1998	SLC Punk!	Young Bob "Heroin Bob" Williams	
2002	QIK2JDG	"Jackal"	Short
2003	44 Minutes: The North Hollywood Shoot-Out	Ramon	TV movie
2003	Pledge of Allegiance	Pat	
2005	Venice Underground	"T-Bone"	
2006	Crank	Warehouse Hood Leader	
2006	Dishdogz	Cooper	
2007	Black Irish	Anthony	
2009	Blood and Bone	"Tattoo"	
2011	Clear Skies 3	Guy "Ghost" Stone	
2011	Rampart	"Seize" Chasco	
2014	Veronica Mars	Eli "Weevil" Navarro	
2022	Shadows	Axel	

=== Television ===
Year	Title	Role	Notes
1996	My Guys	Francis DeMarco	Episode: "Pilot" & "Tangled Web"
1997	413 Hope St.	Tony Garrett	Episode: "Fatherhood"
2001	Walker, Texas Ranger	"Ace"	Episode: "Division Street"
2001	So Little Time	Tony	Episode: "There's Something About Riley"
2002	The Shield	Jesus Rosales	Episode: "Two Days of Blood"
2003	The Division	James Barlow	Episode: "Cold Comfort"
2003	The O.C.	"Z"	Episode: "The Gamble"
2003	CSI: Crime Scene Investigation	Tough Punk	Episode: "Homebodies"
2003	American Dreams	Palladino	Recurring cast: season 2
2003	The Guardian	Donny Longo	Episode: "Let God Sort 'Em Out"
2004	Crossing Jordan	Detective Jason Harris	Episode: "Most Likely"
2004	Without a Trace	Tito Cruz	Episode: "In the Dark"
2004–2007, 2019	Veronica Mars	Eli "Weevil" Navarro	Main cast (69 episodes)
2005	Blind Justice	Mike Barreras	Episode: "Past Imperfect"
2005	Judging Amy	Marcus	Episode: "Getting Out"
2006–2008	Heroes	Jesse Murphy	Guest: season 1, recurring cast: season 3
2007	The Closer	Miguel Torres	Episode: "Four to Eight"
2007	Criminal Minds	Ervin	Episode: "Children of the Dark"
2008	Heroes Unmasked	Himself	Episode: "New Heroes on the Block"
2008	Friday Night Lights	Devin Diablo	Episode: "Who Do You Think You Are?"
2008	Lincoln Heights	Carlo	Episode: "Glass House"
2008	Sons of Anarchy	Mayan Hitman	Episode: "The Pull"
2009	Castle	Juan Restrepo	Episode: "Little Girl Lost"
2009	NCIS	Eddie Castillo	Episode: "Child's Play"
2010	Blue Bloods	Pablo Torres	Episode: "Brothers"
2010	Bones	Antony Truxton	Episode: "The Doctor in the Photo"
2012	Touch	Biker Guy	Episode: "Music of the Spheres"
2014	The Strain	Crispin Elizalde	Recurring cast: season 1
2014	NCIS: Los Angeles	Salazar	Episode: "Deep Trouble: Part 1" & "The 3rd Choir"
2014	Play It Again, Dick	Himself	Main cast
2018–2019	iZombie	Baron	Guest: season 4, recurring cast: season 5

=== Music videos ===
Year	Title	Artist	Role
1995	"Childhood"	Michael Jackson	Elvis
