= Mackintosh Braun =

American electropop group

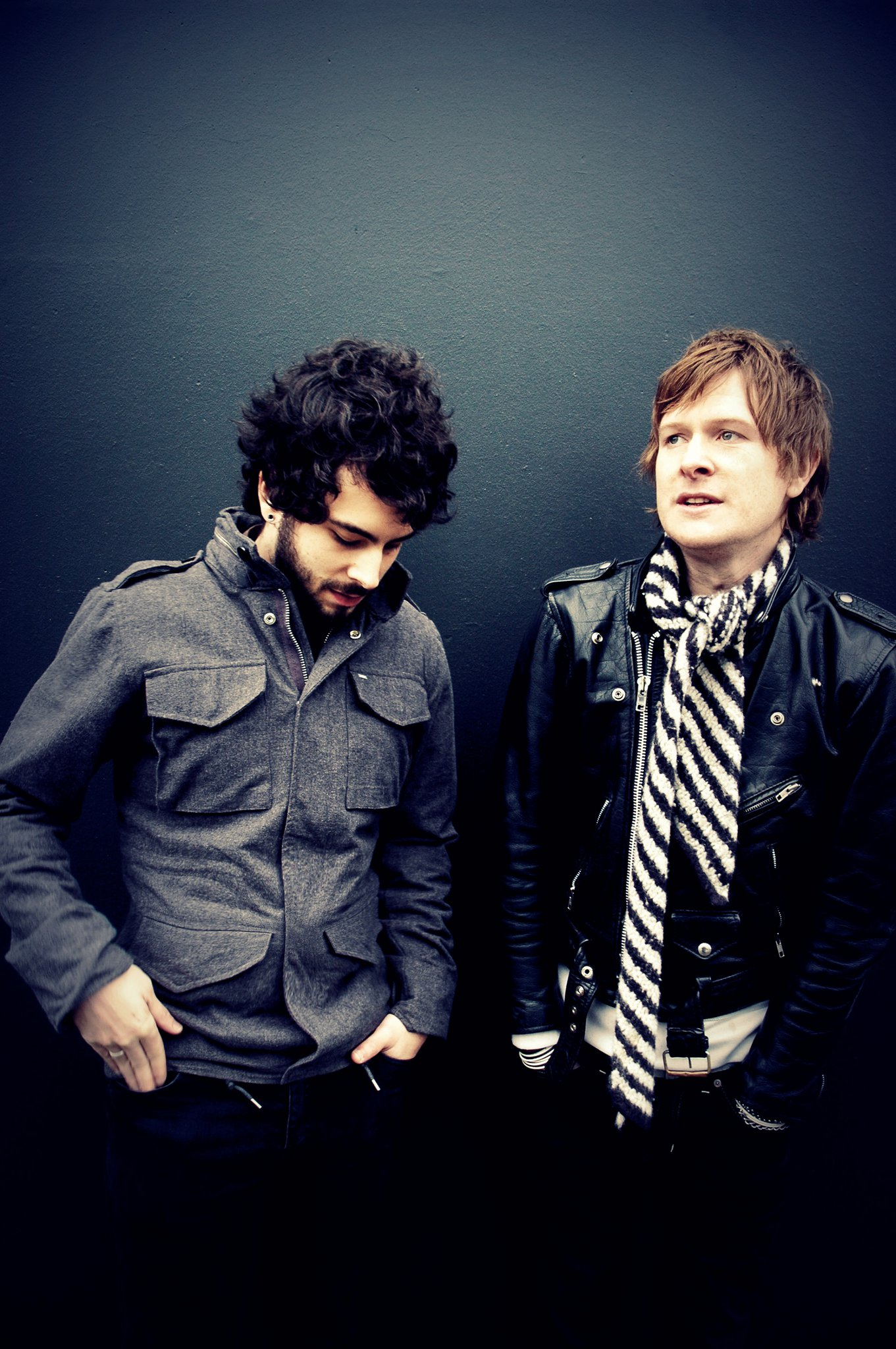

Background information
- Origin: Portland, Oregon, USA
- Genres: Electropop
- Years active: 2006–present
- Labels: Chop Shop Records, Atlantic Records, Universal Music Group
- Members: Ian Mackintosh (pictured right); Ben Braun (pictured left)
- Website: Official Site

Mackintosh Braun is a Portland, Oregon-based electropop group signed to Island Records / Chop Shop Records, a division of the Universal Music Group. The duo is composed of Ian Mackintosh and Ben Braun, who share song-writing and production duties. When performing live the outfit involve other musicians to fill out their sound, including at one point Ben's father Michael Braun, a long-time drummer for Hall & Oates who has also played on a few of the group's recordings.

According to an interview in Spinner, the group's influences range from The Beatles to the Midnight Juggernauts, and the band's public presence has led to profiles and features in Nylon, The Huffington Post, People, NPR Music and Consequence of Sound. The group's second album Where We Are was lauded by the Associated Press as one of 2010's most overlooked albums.

It was announced via Diffuser and their interview in The Huffington Post that Mackintosh Braun would be releasing their third album Arcadia in June 2015. The album stream premiered June 15, 2015 with Vice Media, Inc. (Noisey) describing the album as "... a poppy gem, filled with soulful chillwave and dance tunes that are just in time for the summer. The album implores you to ride a wave of good vibes, punctuated by drums that remind you how great organic instrumentation can complement a synthesizer." Arcadia was released June 16 through Chop Shop Records / Island Records.

Clash announced in June 2017 that Ben Braun of Mackintosh Braun would be releasing a solo album entitled Silent Science on Diving Bell Records and premiered the first single "Prague". The album was released on October 6, 2017, and had tracks featured in both Riverdale (2017 TV series) and Dynasty (2017 TV series).

Ben Braun has been writing and releasing music under the moniker Hotel Pools since 2018.

== History ==
According to a profile in the ABC Music Lounge, Mackintosh Braun was formed largely by accident:

Ben's father bought a new house through a realtor who knew Ian. The two got to talking about music, Ian's name came up, a tape was exchanged, and next thing you know Ben was playing Ian's music in his living room. "It blew me away," Ben recalls. "We didn't know each other at all, but immediately I realized we both want to hear the same things. Even now, when we're writing, he'll do something and I'll think, 'shit, I was going to do that.'" The pair began making music together. Then, when Ian was evicted from his apartment, he started crashing at Ben's studio and the band really took off. Following six months of feverish writing and recording, Mackintosh Braun emerged with their self-released debut, The Sound. The album included "Wake Up," an affecting electro-jam which perfectly captured the sound the duo was going for: ethereal and elegant but also deeply emotional. The track was selected for inclusion on an episode of the TV show Chuck and suddenly Mackintosh Braun had gone from a studio project between two music obsessives to a full-fledged band signed to Chop Shop.

== TV / Film Placements ==
Mackintosh Braun have received TV and film placement exposure, including on the television shows Chuck, How to Make It in America, The Carrie Diaries (TV series), Grey's Anatomy, Shades of Blue (TV series) and Gossip Girl. The band's track "Frozen" was featured in the 2011 film The Beaver. In February 2014 it was announced that their new single "Never Give In" would be featured in the film adaptation of Veronica Mars (film) and on the soundtrack, both being released in March.

== Discography ==
=== Studio albums ===
- The Sound (2007, Self-Published)
- Where We Are (2010, Chop Shop/Atlantic Records)
- Arcadia (2015, Chop Shop/Island Records)

=== Remixes ===
Year	Remixed song	Original artist
2011	Save Me (Messages)	Orchestral Manoeuvres in the Dark ft/ Aretha Franklin
2012	Walking On Water	Architecture In Helsinki
2012	The Sun	Shiny Toy Guns
2012	Out Of Touch	InnerPartySystem
2012	When the Night Falls	Chromeo
2013	I Don't Want to See	Starfucker
2014	Fall In Love	Barcelona (indie rock band)
2014	Heroes (Unreleased)	Cazzette
2014	I Can't Give You Anything But Love (Unreleased)	Lady Gaga & Tony Bennett
2014	Wishing Wells	The Colourist

In October 2014 it was announced through an interview with Idolator that Mackintosh Braun were in the process of working on a remix for Lady Gaga. The remix was for a song called "I Can't Give You Anything But Love" which was the first single from Gaga and Tony Bennett's jazz standards album Cheek to Cheek (album) released in the same year. The remix ended up fizzling and was never released.

=== Cover Songs ===
Year	Song covered	Original artist
2013 (recorded for The Carrie Diaries)	Somebody's Watching Me	Rockwell ft. Michael Jackson

=== Co-writes ===
Year	Song	Co-write with
2015	Slow Down	Anya Marina
2015	Give Me Fire	Carah Faye Charnow
