= Veronica Mars (film) =

- Theatrical release poster
- Directed by: Rob Thomas
- Screenplay by: Rob Thomas; Diane Ruggiero
- Story by: Rob Thomas
- Based on: Veronica Mars by Rob Thomas
- Produced by: Rob Thomas; Dan Etheridge; Danielle Stokdyk
- Starring: Kristen Bell; Jason Dohring; Krysten Ritter; Ryan Hansen; Francis Capra; Percy Daggs III; Chris Lowell; Tina Majorino; Enrico Colantoni
- Cinematography: Ben Kutchins
- Edited by: Daniel Gabbe
- Music by: Josh Kramon
- Production companies: Warner Bros. Digital; Spondoolie Productions
- Distributed by: Warner Bros. Pictures
- Release dates: March 8, 2014 (SXSW); March 14, 2014 (United States)
- Running time: 107 minutes
- Country: United States
- Language: English
- Budget: $6 million
- Box office: $3.5 million

Veronica Mars is a 2014 American neo-noir mystery film directed and produced by Rob Thomas, who co-wrote the script with Diane Ruggiero. It is a continuing film adaptation based on the television series of the same name created by Thomas. The film stars Kristen Bell as the title character, alongside an ensemble supporting cast that includes Jason Dohring, Francis Capra, Krysten Ritter, Percy Daggs III, Tina Majorino, Ryan Hansen, Chris Lowell, Max Greenfield and Enrico Colantoni, each reprising their roles. Set 9 years after the events of the third season, the plot follows Veronica Mars returning to her hometown in Neptune to investigate the death of a former classmate allegedly murdered by Mars's ex-boyfriend, Logan Echolls.

After the series's cancellation in 2007, Thomas wrote a feature film script, continuing the story. However, Warner Bros. declined to fund the project. On March 13, 2013, Thomas and Bell launched a fundraising campaign on Kickstarter to produce the film. It attained its goal of $2 million in eleven hours, breaking several Kickstarter records, including being the largest successful film project on the website. After raising a budget of $5 million by the end of its run, principal photography began in June 2013 in Los Angeles, and concluded in July 2013. An additional day of shooting took place in December 2013.

Veronica Mars held its world premiere at South by Southwest on March 8, 2014, and was released in the United States in a limited theatrical release and through video on demand on March 14, 2014, by Warner Bros. Pictures. The film received positive reviews from critics and audiences, with many praising the writing and Bell's performance. It earned $3.5 million worldwide against a $6 million budget. The revival of the series has also sparked continuations through different media, including two novels, co-written by Thomas and Jennifer Graham, and a web series centered on Hansen, titled Play It Again, Dick, released on CW Seed. In 2019, Hulu revived the original series for a fourth season.

== Plot ==
Nine years after the events of the series finale, former teenage sleuth Veronica Mars has left Neptune, California, and moved to New York City, where she is in a relationship with Stosh "Piz" Piznarski and has a job offer from the prestigious law firm Truman-Mann and Associates.

Veronica is contacted by her ex-boyfriend Logan Echolls, now a Lieutenant in the United States Navy, who has been accused of murdering his girlfriend, Carrie Bishop. She was a fellow Neptune High graduate who became the self-destructive pop star, "Bonnie DeVille". He is being bombarded for help from lawyers, and Veronica agrees to return to Neptune to aid Logan find one who will best represent him. She reunites with her father Keith Mars, Neptune's former sheriff-turned-private investigator, who shows her that corruption and classism are rife under Sheriff Dan Lamb, the brother of the previous Sheriff Don Lamb.

Veronica investigates the circumstances of Carrie's death. During her investigation, she attends her ten-year high school reunion with Wallace Fennel and Cindy "Mac" MacKenzie. There, she learns that former outlaw biker Eli "Weevil" Navarro is now a reformed family man. During the reunion, Veronica realizes Carrie's murder is connected to that of Carrie's best friend, Susan Knight, who disappeared off a boat nine years earlier.

After Veronica's nemesis Madison Sinclair projects a copy of Veronica's college sex tape with Piz, a fight breaks out. The reunion comes to an abrupt end as she sets the sprinklers off. Attending an after party, she speaks with Dick Casablancas, Luke Haldeman and his fiancée Gia Goodman, and Stu "Cobb" Cobbler, all of whom were with Susan and Carrie on the boat the night Susan disappeared. Meanwhile, while driving home from the reunion, Weevil stops to help a driver being harassed by bikers, only to be shot by her, Celeste Kane. The sheriff's department plants a gun so she can claim self-defense, and Keith agrees to prove Weevil's innocence.

Veronica concludes that those on Susan's boat years ago covered up the circumstances of her death and Carrie was killed because she threatened to confess. As compromising videos of Carrie are posted online, Veronica traces them back to Vinnie Van Lowe, who has been planting spyware on celebrities and selling the footage.

Veronica uses Vinnie's footage to prove Gia lured Logan to Carrie's the night of her murder, suggesting that she and Luke killed Carrie, framing Logan. Lamb ignores her evidence and refuses to follow up, but unbeknownst to him Veronica records the conversation. Having stayed in Neptune longer than planned, Veronica calls Piz in New York to explain that she cannot return yet, and he breaks it off. Truman-Mann rescinds their job offer, resulting in an argument between Keith and Veronica.

Keith meets with Deputy Sacks about Weevil's case, but they are attacked by someone in a truck who slams into Sacks's car, killing him and leaving Keith in critical condition. Veronica and Logan sleep together, establishing a relationship. She sends bugged flowers to Gia's and calls her with recordings of Carrie's voice, hoping to scare her into confessing to being behind her death. Gia panics and calls Cobb, revealing his involvement. Veronica goes to Gia's apartment to confront her, where Gia reveals that Cobb is the mastermind of Carrie's death and framing Logan: Susan overdosed, and he took photos of a panicked Carrie, Gia, and Luke dumping Susan's body and has been blackmailing them.

Veronica's bug broadcasts this via a radio frequency which she believed to be unused but is actually that of a local radio station. Cobb hears their conversation over the radio from his apartment in the building opposite, then shoots and kills Gia through the window before coming after Veronica. She calls the police and lures Cobb to the basement, beating him unconscious.

Logan returns to active duty in the Navy but promises to come back to Veronica. Cobb's photo and the secret recording of Lamb refusing to investigate Veronica's claims leak online, forcing Lamb to arrest Cobb, with calls to oust Lamb from office. Keith and Weevil recover from their injuries, but Weevil returns to the criminal lifestyle. Veronica takes over her father's private investigator business with Mac as her assistant, resolved to help fight Neptune's corruption.

In a mid-credit scene, James Franco is seen trying to find words that rhyme with orange.

== Cast ==
- Kristen Bell as Veronica Mars
- Jason Dohring as Logan Echolls
- Krysten Ritter as Gia Goodman
- Ryan Hansen as Dick Casablancas
- Francis Capra as Eli "Weevil" Navarro
- Percy Daggs III as Wallace Fennel
- Chris Lowell as Stosh "Piz" Piznarski
- Tina Majorino as Cindy "Mac" Mackenzie
- Enrico Colantoni as Keith Mars
- Gaby Hoffmann as Ruby Jetson
- Jerry O'Connell as Sheriff Dan Lamb, brother of the late Sheriff Don Lamb from the series.
- Brandon Hillock as Deputy Jerry Sacks
- Martin Starr as Stu "Cobb" Cobbler
- Ken Marino as Vinnie Van Lowe
- Max Greenfield as Leo D'Amato
- Amanda Noret as Madison Sinclair
- Daran Norris as Cliff McCormack
- Andrea Estella as Bonnie DeVille/Carrie Bishop, replacing Leighton Meester in the role.
- Sam Huntington as Luke Haldeman
- Duane Daniels as Principal Van Clemmons
- Jonathan Chesner as Corny
- Jessica Camacho as Martina Vasquez
- Kevin Sheridan as Sean Friedrich
- Lisa Thornhill as Celeste Kane
- Christine Lakin as Susan Knight
- Jamie Lee Curtis as Gayle Buckley

Cameo appearances

- Ryan Lane as Slick Fellow Applicant
- Ira Glass as himself
- Harvey Levin as himself
- Justin Long as Drunken Wingman
- Kyle Bornheimer as Heliskier
- Dax Shepard as Overconfident Club Boy
- James Franco as himself
- Eden Sher as Penny
- Dave "Gruber" Allen as 60-Year-Old Rocker
- Alejandro Escovedo as a busker.
- Eddie Jemison as JC Borden

== Production ==
=== Development ===
Following the series's cancellation, Rob Thomas wrote a feature film script continuing the storyline, but Warner Bros. opted not to fund the project at the time. On March 13, 2013, Thomas and star Kristen Bell launched a fundraising campaign to produce the film through Kickstarter, offering various incentives to those who donated $10 or more. Bell, Thomas, Enrico Colantoni, Ryan Hansen, and Jason Dohring appeared in a video promoting the campaign, and it attained the $2 million goal in less than eleven hours. In its first day on Kickstarter, the project broke the record as the fastest project to reach first $1 million, then $2 million; it also achieved the highest minimal pledging goal achieved, and became the largest successful film project on Kickstarter at the time. On its final campaign day, the project broke the record for the most backers on a single Kickstarter project, previously held by the Double Fine Adventure. Afterwards, the film earned a greenlight from Warner Bros. Digital Distribution.

The Kickstarter campaign ended on April 13, with 91,585 donors raising $5,702,153.

On April 5, Thomas had completed the first draft of the script. In early April, Dohring (Logan Echolls) officially signed on for the film. In May, Thomas confirmed Colantoni would reprise his role as Keith Mars in the film. In June, it was announced that Percy Daggs III, Chris Lowell, and Francis Capra would return as Wallace Fennel, Stosh "Piz" Piznarski, and Eli "Weevil" Navarro, respectively. The same month, Sam Huntington (Luke Halderman), Amanda Noret (Madison Sinclair), Daran Norris (Cliff McCormack), and Tina Majorino (Cindy "Mac" Mackenzie) joined the cast. On July 14, 2013, it was announced that Leighton Meester would not be reprising her role of Carrie Bishop. Rob Thomas stated "Sadly, Leighton was doing a different movie during the same time frame on the wrong coast. In the end, she was unavailable." She was replaced by music artist Andrea Estella, of whom Thomas is a fan.

=== Filming ===
Principal photography began on June 17, 2013, in Los Angeles and lasted 28 days. Initial filming involved 120 scenes, which Thomas described as "an aggressive schedule." The Santa Monica Pier, the Vincent Thomas Bridge, The Edison at the Higgins Building, were among the 28 locations used for the filming. Scenes were also shot at the Arts District of Los Angeles and at Long Beach, California. Following a test screening in October 2013, Warner Bros. agreed to pay for an additional day of shooting in order to clarify a plot point. As a result, two scenes were shot during the following December.

=== Music ===
The musical score for Veronica Mars was composed by Josh Kramon, who previously wrote the original background music to the television series. A soundtrack album containing Kramon's score was released on March 14, 2014.

=== Soundtrack ===
A compilation album of music featured in the film was released digitally by WaterTower Music on March 4, 2014. The album features the television series's original title song "We Used to Be Friends" by The Dandy Warhols, as well as a new acoustic version by Alejandro Escovedo and other songs by Emperor X, Twin Sister, ZZ Ward, Sufjan Stevens, Max Schneider, Mackintosh Braun, Typhoon, Lou Rawls, and Gregory Alan Isakov.

No.	Title	Artist	Length
1.	"We Used to Be Friends"	Alejandro Escovedo	3:30
2.	"Go Captain and Pinlighter"	Emperor X	4:13
3.	"Holding My Breath"	Twin Sister	4:12
4.	"All Around and Away We Go"	Twin Sister	4:36
5.	"Criminal"	ZZ Ward featuring Freddie Gibbs	3:51
6.	"Chicago"	Sufjan Stevens	6:05
7.	"Stick Up"	Max Schneider	2:55
8.	"Never Give In"	Mackintosh Braun	3:25
9.	"Prosthetic Love"	Typhoon	4:03
10.	"You'll Never Find Another Love Like Mine"	Lou Rawls	4:25
11.	"Second Chances"	Gregory Alan Isakov	3:50
12.	"We Used to Be Friends"	The Dandy Warhols	3:19
13.	"Mug Shot" (bonus iTunes track only)	Max Schneider	2:54
Total length:			51:18

== Distribution ==
When Veronica Mars was almost finished, Warner Bros. Pictures came aboard and agreed to give the film a wider theatrical release in the United States. The film was released on March 14, 2014, with a majority of its showings held by AMC Theatres. In Australia there was a handful of "fan screenings" held at select Hoyts cinemas in each state. On this same day, the film also became available to rent and buy through video on demand and online platforms. Veronica Mars was the first film distributed theatrically and for home viewing at the same time in the United States by one of Hollywood's six major studios.

The film had its world premiere at the South by Southwest film festival on March 8, 2014, and a panel was held at PaleyFest on March 13, 2014.

=== Home media ===
The film was released in DVD and Blu-ray formats on May 6, 2014. It made $2.2 million from Blu-ray and DVD sales in its first two weeks of release.

== Reception ==
=== Box office ===
Preliminary box office tracking reports were initially up in the air due to the unprecedented financial nature of Veronica Mars. The film earned $260,000 from its Thursday night showings (in 95 theaters), and reached a $1 million 1.25-day total after expanding to 291 theaters on Friday. In its opening weekend, the film grossed $1,988,351 in 291 theaters in the United States, ranking #11 at the box office. Analysts at the time noted that the unusual financial history and distribution of the film made it difficult to interpret these numbers or to compare them to those of other films.

The film grossed $3,322,127 in domestic box office and $163,000 in foreign box office (Austria, Germany and United Kingdom) for a worldwide total of $3,485,127.

=== Critical response ===
Veronica Mars has received positive reviews from critics, with many praising Bell's performance as the title character. On Rotten Tomatoes, the film holds an 80% approval rating, based on 138 reviews, with an average score of 6.70/10. The site's consensus states: "It might be a more entertaining watch for diehard fans of the show, but Veronica Mars offers enough sharp writing and solid performances to entertain viewers in the mood for a character-driven thriller." On Metacritic, the film has a score of 62 out of 100, based on 35 critics, indicating "generally favorable reviews".

Sheri Linden of The Hollywood Reporter gave the film a positive review, citing it as "a solid cinematic turn for the Nancy Drew of the new millennium, [while] sure to delight crowdfunding backers and other fans of the source series."

=== Awards ===
Year	Nominee / work	Award	Result
2014	Veronica Mars	mtvU Fandom Awards Fandom of the Year	Won
2014	Kristen Bell	MTV Movie Award for Favorite Character	Nominated
2014	Veronica Mars	Teen Choice Award for Choice Movie - Drama	Nominated
2014	Kristen Bell	Teen Choice Award for Choice Movie Actress: Drama	Nominated
2014	Jason Dohring	Teen Choice Award for Choice Movie Actor: Drama	Nominated

== Sequel ==
On March 13, 2014, Variety reported that actress Kristen Bell is interested in reprising her role as Veronica Mars in a sequel; however, one has not yet been officially announced. Thomas revealed that he and Warner Bros. had a "magic number" in mind for the first film to earn in order to make a sequel possible. In an interview with Michael Ausiello published on July 29, 2014, Rob Thomas stated: "I'm optimistic. The [first] movie made money which was key to maybe seeing a second one, so yeah, I'd love to do it."

=== Novels ===
A series of novels, written by series creator Rob Thomas and Jennifer Graham, continue the story after the events of the Veronica Mars film and also feature Logan, Mac, Wallace, and Dick. On July 15, 2013, it was announced that Thomas and Alloy Entertainment signed a two-book deal with Vintage Books. Picking up where the film ends, the first book in the deal, titled The Thousand Dollar Tan Line, was published on March 25, 2014, as a Vintage Books trade paperback (ISBN 978-0-8041-7070-3), an eBook (ISBN 978-0-8041-7071-0), and an unabridged audiobook read by Kristen Bell (ISBN 978-0-8041-9351-1). The second novel, Veronica Mars: Mr. Kiss and Tell, also published by Vintage Books, was released on January 20, 2015. Thomas has said in interviews that the novels are canon, and would not be negated by a future film.

=== Web spin-off ===
In addition to the book series, The CW announced plans for a web series centered on Ryan Hansen as a version of himself trying to make a Dick Casablancas spin-off of Veronica Mars. The eight-part web series, Play It Again, Dick, premiered on CW Seed on September 8, 2014, before concluding on November 4.

=== Series continuation ===
On August 21, 2018, it was reported that Hulu was planning an eight-episode revival of Veronica Mars with Bell and series creator Thomas returning, with an official announcement by Bell and additional details revealed on September 20. Thomas confirmed the revival would take place after the events depicted in the film and novels. The eight-episode season was released on July 19, 2019.
