= Clear Skies (machinima) =

2008-11 machinima series by Ian Chisholm

- Engines: Source engine Eve Online
- Genre: Space Western
- Running time: 39:14 (Clear Skies); 45:57 (Clear Skies 2); 73:33 (Clear Skies 3)
- Created by: Ian Chisholm; Richie Powles
- Voices: Ian Chisholm; Richie Powles; Shazia Rochford; John Guthrie; Dan Ellis; Ricky Grove; Robert Brian Duff; Mark Kindell; Darren Blake; Mark Germany; Andy Carter; Brett Hawkins; Fay Wheeler; Andrew Salter; Nick Mahon; Paul Rochford; Ken Roberts; Kate Ertan; Francis Capra; Ellie Smith; Brett Hawkins; Kerrie Holland; Ewald Gartner; Roseanna Webb; Kerry Rose
- Release(s): May 29, 2008 – May 29, 2011
- Format: Windows Media

Clear Skies is a machinima series created by Ian Chisholm. The series is based on the fictional universe of the game Eve Online. The first film was released on May 29, 2008, followed by two sequels in 2009 and 2011.

== Plot ==
The plot follows the crew of the Minmatar Tempest class battleship Clear Skies as they try to make a living in New Eden. The story begins with the ship's captain, John Rourke, negotiating the price of repairs for the ship at a space station, presumably following a pirate attack. The repairs leave them out of cash and looking for a new contract. Rourke finds a contract to transport Mr Smith—"an idiot in a shiny suit"—a short distance through the fringes of normally safe Empire space, with an unusually high payout. The crew grudgingly accepts the 'death trap' contract as the only applicable option in an unfruitful search.

== Characters ==
- John Rourke voiced by Ian Chisholm
- Solomon Burke voiced by Richie Powles
- Charlie Fodder voiced by John Guthrie
- Tarquin Smith voiced by Dan Ellis
- Sascha Culhane voiced by Shazia Rochford
- Falcon Hausmann voiced by Ricky Grove
- Guy "Ghost" Stone voiced by Francis Capra

== Production ==
The first two films were created using Editstudio 5, CoolEdit 96, Fraps, the Source SDK and PaintShop Pro. For the production of the third film Chisholm used Sony Vegas Pro 9, Adobe After Effects, Paintshop Pro, Adobe Photoshop, Cooledit 96, Fraps, IPISoft Markerless Motion capture, Softimage XSI, CCP's in-house "Melissa engine", used for their game trailers, and the Source SDK.

In January 2020, Ian Chisholm stated Clear Skies 4 will be moving away from the Half Life Engine. He plans to use the 3D animation software iClone7 for production of the latest work in the series. According to this post, the script is complete after 9 months of work.

A few months later Chisholm posted a request for volunteers to work on the project. He estimates 2–3 years work will be required to complete the next movie.

=== Reception ===
The reception to the films has been favourable by Eve Online community. Notably, CCP have featured Clear Skies on the player news page and on the ingame news section.

On the main distribution platform, EVE Files, Clear Skies has been downloaded via BitTorrent over 13000 times and Clear Skies 2 notes over 23000 torrent downloads. Within the first 24 hours since release Clear Skies 3 was downloaded over 5000 times via BitTorrent. Within 48 hours, Clear Skies was downloaded over 20,000 times.

Massively.com's James Egan calls Clear Skies a "machinima masterpiece".

In the year of the release, the first film won the Mackie Award in the category Best Long Format Film at the New York Machinima FilmFest 2008 and the Grand Prize Jury Award of the Machinima Expo. Clear Skies 2 won the Jury Award of the Machinima Expo in 2009 and the public choice award at the Atopic Festival de films Machinima 2010.
