= List of Veronica Mars characters =

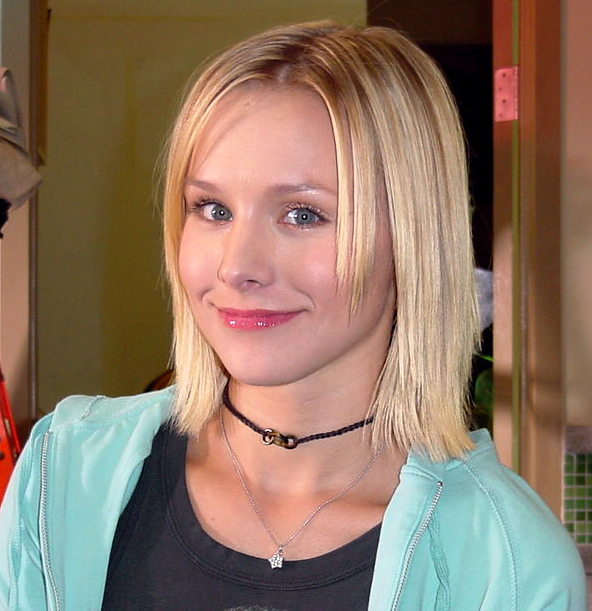
Kristen Bell on the set of Veronica Mars

Veronica Mars is an American television series created by Rob Thomas. The series premiered on September 22, 2004, during network UPN's last two years, and ended on May 22, 2007, after a season on UPN's successor network, The CW. Balancing murder mystery, high-school, and college drama, the series features social commentary with sarcasm and off-beat humor in a style often compared to film noir. Set in the fictional town of Neptune, the series stars Kristen Bell as the title character, a student who progresses from high school to college during the series while moonlighting as a private investigator under the wing of her detective father.

The first season had seven regular characters. However, Thomas decided to introduce and eliminate several characters in order to create an "equally fascinating mystery" for the series' second season. Thomas needed "new blood" since he felt unable to bring back the Kanes and the Echolls and "have them all involved in a new mystery". The third season features a cast of ten actors who receive billing, an increase from the nine actors in the second. Three of the regulars in the second season are written out of the series, two new characters are introduced and two others are upgraded from recurring roles.

== Overview ==
Actor	Character	Seasons				
Actor	Character	1	2	3	Film	4
Main
Kristen Bell	Veronica Mars	Main	Main	Main	Main	Main
Percy Daggs III	Wallace Fennel	Main	Main	Main	Main	Recurring
Teddy Dunn	Duncan Kane	Main	Main			
Jason Dohring	Logan Echolls	Main	Main	Main	Main	Main
Sydney Tamiia Poitier	Mallory Dent	Main				
Francis Capra	Weevil	Main	Main	Main	Main	Recurring
Enrico Colantoni	Keith Mars	Main	Main	Main	Main	Main
Ryan Hansen	Dick Casablancas	Recurring	Main	Main	Main	Recurring
Kyle Gallner	Beaver Casablancas	Recurring	Main			
Tessa Thompson	Jackie Cook		Main			
Tina Majorino	Mac	Recurring	Recurring	Main	Main	
Michael Muhney	Don Lamb	Recurring	Recurring	Main		
Julie Gonzalo	Parker Lee			Main		Guest
Krysten Ritter	Gia Goodman		Recurring		Main	
Chris Lowell	Piz			Main	Main	
Starring
Ken Marino	Vinnie Van Lowe	Recurring	Recurring	Recurring	Starring	Recurring
Daran Norris	Cliff McCormack	Recurring	Recurring	Recurring	Starring	Recurring
Duane Daniels	Van Clemmons	Recurring	Recurring	Recurring	Starring	Guest
Max Greenfield	Leo D'Amato	Recurring	Recurring	Recurring	Starring	Recurring
Amanda Noret	Madison Sinclair	Recurring	Recurring	Recurring	Starring	
Christopher B. Duncan	Clarence Weidman	Recurring	Recurring	Guest		Guest
Kyle Secor	Jake Kane	Recurring	Guest			Guest
Lisa Thornhill	Celeste Kane	Recurring	Recurring		Starring	
David Starzyk	Richard "Big Dick" Casablancas		Guest	Guest		Recurring
Rodney Rowland	Liam Fitzpatrick		Recurring	Recurring		Guest

== Main characters ==
=== Veronica Mars ===
Kristen Bell portrays the titular Veronica Mars, a high school junior and skilled private detective. More than 500 women auditioned for the role; Bell felt that it was "just luck" that Rob Thomas saw that "I have some sass to me, and that's exactly what he wanted." Bell thought that her "cheerleader looks and outsider's attitude" set her apart from the other women who auditioned.

=== Duncan Kane ===
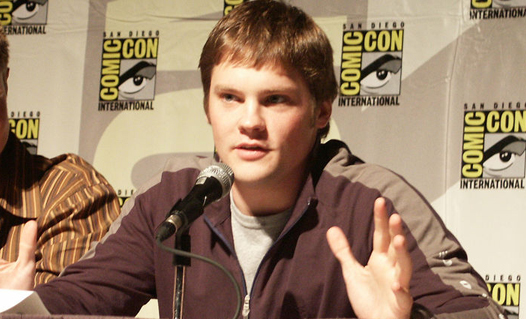
Teddy Dunn, who portrayed Duncan, originally auditioned for the role of Logan.

Teddy Dunn portrayed Duncan Kane, Veronica's ex-boyfriend and Lilly's brother. Dunn originally auditioned for Logan but ended up portraying Duncan Kane. Dunn left the series midway through the second season because Thomas felt that the Logan-Veronica-Duncan love triangle had run its course. He needed to put "other guys in her life" to keep the series fresh and attributed Dunn's removal to fan interest in the Logan-Veronica relationship, saying "It became clear that one suitor won out".

=== Logan Echolls ===
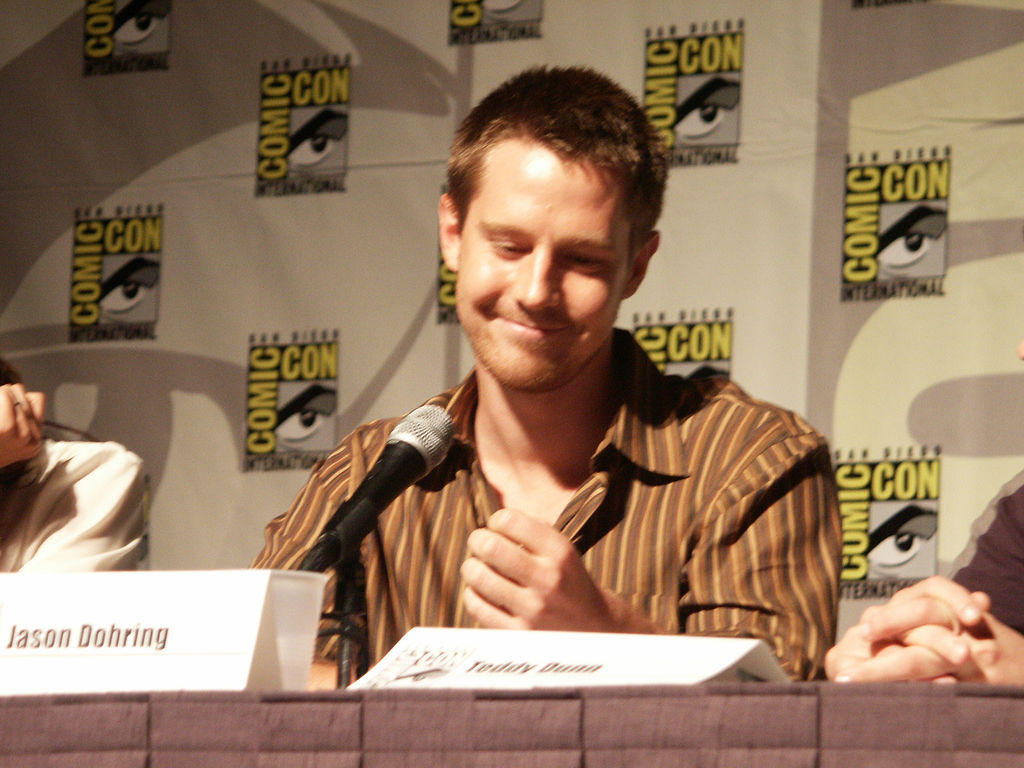
Jason Dohring's character Logan was originally a guest star in the pilot.

Jason Dohring played Logan Echolls, the "bad-boy 09er" son of an A-list actor. Dohring originally auditioned for the role of Duncan Kane. After his audition, the producers asked Dohring to audition for Logan's character, who was only going to be a guest role in the pilot. Dohring felt that his audition for Duncan "was a little dark", and was told by the producers that it was "not really right". The producers then asked Dohring to read for the role of Logan. Dohring acted out one scene from the pilot, bashing a car's headlights in with a tire iron. During the final auditions, Dohring read two times with Bell and met with the studio and the network. When reading with Bell, Dohring acted the whole scene as if he was the one who raped her and tried to give the character a certain evil feel.

=== Wallace Fennel ===
Percy Daggs III portrayed Wallace Fennel, Veronica's best friend and frequent partner in mystery solving. Daggs auditioned for Wallace's role twice before being cast and had to go through three tests with the studio and network executives. During his first audition, Daggs read four scenes from the pilot. Just before his studio test, Daggs read with Bell and had "a great conversation". He said that she "made me feel comfortable about auditioning" and was a big reason why he became more comfortable playing Wallace as the season went on.

=== Eli "Weevil" Navarro ===
Francis Capra portrayed Eli "Weevil" Navarro, the leader of the PCH Biker gang and Veronica's ally. Despite often being in trouble with the law, Weevil helps Veronica solve many of her cases. He is wrongfully accused of fellow gang member Thumper's murder and is arrested at his graduation. He later becomes a janitor at Hearst College after he is cleared.

Capra reprises his role in the Veronica Mars film, in which Weevil is revealed to have since married a woman named Jade, with whom he has a daughter, Valentina.

=== Keith Mars ===
Enrico Colantoni played Veronica's father Keith Mars, a private investigator and former Balboa County Sheriff. Keith's targeting of billionaire Jake Kane as the primary suspect for Lilly Kane's death led to a public outcry for Keith Mars to be immediately removed from office. Disgraced, Keith was forced into private investigator work. Veronica often helps him solve cases.

=== Mallory Dent ===
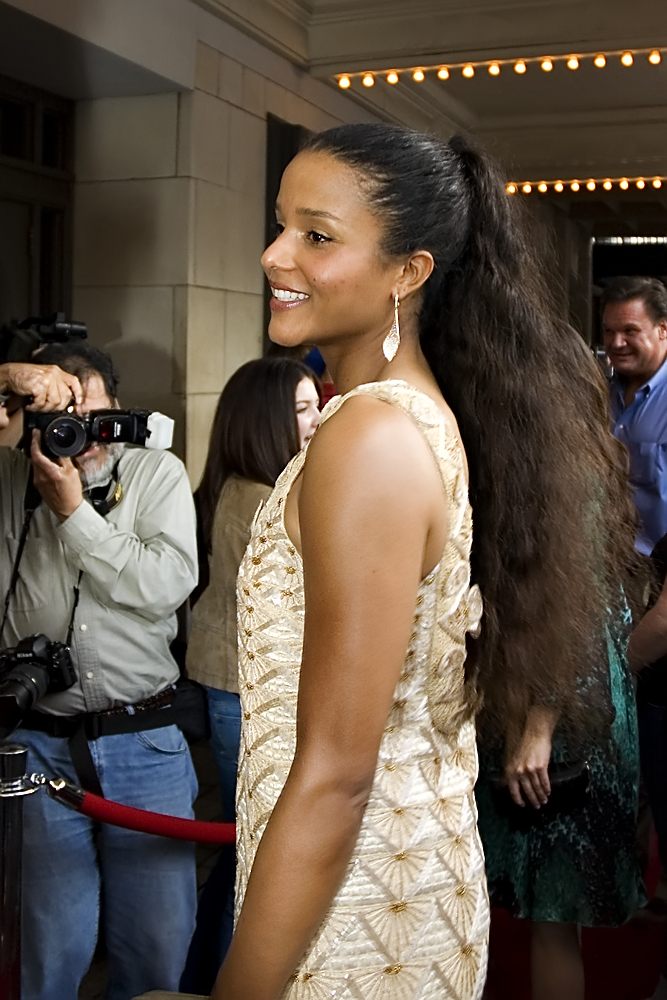
Poitier was given series regular billing but appeared in only a total of four episodes.

Sydney Tamiia Poitier played Mallory Dent, Veronica's journalism teacher at Neptune High, through the first half of the first season. Ms. Dent, as she was commonly referred to, was the only teacher who took Veronica at face value, not based on prejudices. Together with Veronica, she was responsible for uncovering the voting scam that led to Duncan winning the school elections illegally. Ms. Dent left her job after becoming pregnant. Although she was given regular series billing, Poitier appeared in only four episodes but was given credit for seven. Poitier's removal from the series was rumored to be due to budget issues.

=== Jackie Cook ===
Tessa Thompson portrayed Jackie Cook in the second season as Wallace's romantic interest and the daughter of a famous baseball player. Fan reactions to the character were generally negative, particularly after Veronica witnessed Jackie talking to a guy while dating Wallace. Thomas blamed the character's reception on his error in judgment: he had hoped fans would question whether it was Jackie or Veronica in the wrong; however, the audience automatically assumed that it was Jackie. Thomas decided not to change the story arc he had planned for Jackie, as he believed Thompson was "a fantastic actress and she's got more to play". He said that whether fans ended up liking Jackie was "up in the air", but he hoped that they did because "she's really, really good". Jackie was subsequently written out of the series at the end of the second season.

=== Dick Casablancas ===
Ryan Hansen portrayed Richard "Dick" Casablancas Jr., an 09er friend of Logan, a womanizer and former high-school bully turned frat boy. Dick was a recurring character in the first season but was upgraded to series regular in the second season.

=== Beaver Casablancas ===
Kyle Gallner acted as Cassidy "Beaver" Casablancas, Dick's introverted younger brother. Cassidy was a recurring character in the first season, but was upgraded to series regular in the second season.

=== Cindy "Mac" Mackenzie ===
Tina Majorino portrayed Cindy "Mac" Mackenzie, a computer expert befriended by Veronica. While looking into Mac's parents' past as a favor for her, Veronica uncovers that Mac was accidentally switched at birth with Madison Sinclair by the hospital where they were both born, but the respective parents did not learn about this until years later, by which time they had already grown to love their accidentally adopted daughters. Mac was a recurring character in the first two seasons but was upgraded to series regular in the third.

=== Parker Lee ===
Julie Gonzalo portrayed Parker Lee, Mac's extroverted roommate at Hearst College, described by Thomas as "everything that Mac is not". Parker was introduced in the third season as a series regular.

=== Piz ===
Chris Lowell played Stosh "Piz" Piznarski, Wallace's roommate at Hearst College and a music lover with his campus radio show. Piz was introduced in the third season as a series regular and was named after the director of the pilot, Mark Piznarski. The character's role was to have another male friend for Veronica, middle-class and not upper-class. Thomas used the radio show as a narrative device to capture the mood of the university. Throughout the third season, Piz is implied to have a crush on Veronica. The two develop a friendship, although he's initially hurt by seeing her with Logan. After Veronica breaks up with Logan, she starts dating Piz in "Debasement Tapes". When a sex tape of Veronica and Piz starts circulating via email, Logan beats up Piz, believing him to be behind it. Veronica's investigations revealed that the video originated from a Hearst College secret society named The Castle.

Piz reappears in the Veronica Mars film, where he is shown to have since relocated to New York City with Veronica. When she temporarily visits her hometown to help her ex-boyfriend Logan find a lawyer, she gets dragged to her high-school reunion by Wallace and Mac. Piz shows up at the reunion to surprise her, only to join the fight that ensued after Madison Sinclair played a copy of his and Veronica's college sex tape. Piz returned to New York the following morning. After she stayed in Neptune longer than initially planned and didn't show up to meet Piz's parents, he later broke up with Veronica.

=== Don Lamb ===
Michael Muhney portrayed Don Lamb, the Balboa County Sheriff who won the office from Keith in the recall election spearheaded by Jake Kane. Lamb was a recurring character in the first two seasons, but was upgraded to series regular in the third.

=== Gia Goodman ===
Krysten Ritter portrays Gia Goodman, a student at Neptune High and the daughter of influential professional baseball team owner Woody Goodman. Gia transfers to Neptune High from a private boarding school. She attends the class field trip to Shark Field and meets Dick Casablancas, his brother Cassidy, Duncan Kane, and Veronica for the first time. Gia rides the school bus on the way to the stadium. However, she opts to ride in Dick's limo with the other "09ers" on the way back. The bus crashes and all of the passengers die, save for Meg Manning. Later in the year, Gia invites Veronica to her slumber party. Veronica attends; however, she has an ulterior motive and is investigating families that Meg babysat for. When Gia is sent footage of herself at her brother's soccer game, she hires Veronica to find the sender. Gia and Veronica's friendship is broken when a feud erupts between their fathers, and she fires Veronica from the case. When Veronica realizes that Gia's stalker is Neptune High's janitor, Tommy "Lucky" Dohanic, she rushes to her aid. Lucky is arrested, but he is released when the Mannings pay for his bail. The next day, he comes to school with a gun looking for Gia; however, he is shot and killed by school security.

Gia reappears in the Veronica Mars film as a wealthy socialite engaged to Luke Haldeman, a former classmate. Veronica initially suspects her to be responsible for Carrie Bishop's death (who became a self-destructive pop star under the name Bonnie DeVille before the film's events). Veronica connects the murder to Carrie's best friend, Susan Knight, who allegedly died in a boating accident nine years earlier. She concludes that Gia and Luke, who were on the boat with Susan, covered up her death and killed Carrie because she threatened to confess. Veronica sends bugged flowers to Gia's apartment and calls her, playing recordings of Carrie's voice in an attempt to scare her into confessing. Gia panics and calls Stu "Cobb" Cobbler, another classmate who was on the boat with her. Veronica goes over to her apartment to confront her, and Gia reveals Cobb was the mastermind behind Carrie's death as well as what happened on Susan's boat; Susan succumbed to alcohol poisoning, and Cobb took photos of a panicked Carrie, Gia, and Luke dumping Susan's body. He's been using the images to blackmail everyone. Veronica's bug broadcast everything on a frequency she believed to be unused but was used by a local rock station. Cobb heard everything from a radio in his apartment in the building across the street and then shot Gia through the window before coming after Veronica. Veronica calls the police and lures Cobb to the basement, beating him unconscious with a golf club. Gia is revealed to have died from her gunshot wound after Cobb is arrested and guilty of murdering her and Carrie.

=== Alonzo Lozano ===
Clifton Collins Jr. portrays Alonzo Lozano, a hitman for a Mexican cartel. Introduced in season 4, he begins a romantic relationship with Weevil's sister Claudia.

=== Daniel Maloof ===
Mido Hamada portrays Daniel Maloof, a congressman and Alex's older brother. After Tawny's family attempts to attack him and Alex over an engagement ring, he hires Logan as his bodyguard.

=== Matty Ross ===
Izabela Vidovic portrays Matty Ross, a teenager who lost her dad in bombings.

== Recurring characters ==
=== Members of main characters' families ===
==== Casablancas family ====
===== Kendall Casablancas =====
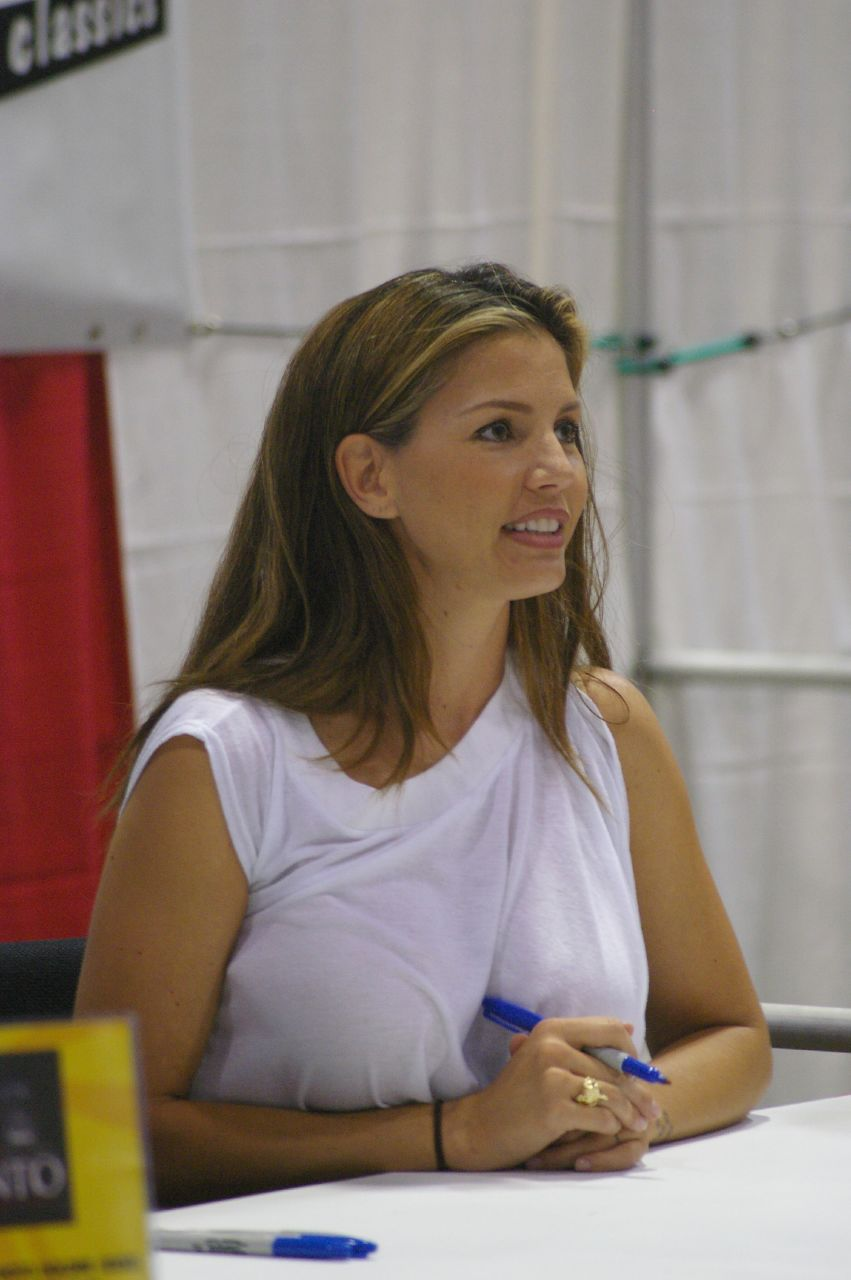
Charisma Carpenter appeared in 11 episodes as Kendall Casablancas.

Charisma Carpenter portrays Kendall Casablancas (Kendall Lacey Shifflet, a fake real name; really Priscilla Banks), Cassidy and Dick's gold-digging stepmother. Kendall first appears in the Season 2 premiere, having married real estate magnate Richard Casablancas, seemingly for his vast wealth. She becomes the stepmother of Dick and Cassidy and begins an affair with their friend, Logan. Cassidy hires Veronica to investigate his stepmother, and she discovers that she helped Richard commit real estate fraud. Veronica told Cassidy and gave the information to the Securities and Exchange Commission; however, Richard fled the country before he could be arrested. Richard's lawyers told Kendall that while the boys both had trust funds, essentially, she had nothing. Kendall became desperate for money, and began selling Richard's belongings, and turned to Logan and Duncan, but no avail. Cassidy, who had started a real estate company called Phoenix Land Trust, needed Kendall to be his CEO for business purposes because of his underage status. Although Kendall and Cassidy admitted their mutual dislike of each other, the salary prospect eventually made Kendall come around. The business continued, though most people assumed Richard was behind Phoenix Land Trust, not Cassidy. When Cassidy informs Kendall they need to acquire more capital, she goes and visits the incarcerated Aaron. She makes a deal with him: he will buy into Phoenix Land Trust if she goes to Duncan and Logan's suite and gets something for him. Kendall goes to the suite and removes some of Duncan's hair from the shower drain. Aaron later uses the hair to plant false evidence implying Duncan committed the crime he was on trial, and Aaron was acquitted.

When Keith discovered that Kendall is the beneficiary of the life insurance policies on her stepsons, who could have been killed in the bus crash that claimed the lives of several people, he began investigating. He and Veronica discover that everything they know about Kendall is a lie; she is not a dumb trophy wife, rather a con artist named Priscilla Banks. She had been working with the Fitzpatrick crime family, and spent time in jail to protect her lover, Cormac Fitzpatrick (Jason Beghe). Keith breaks into Kendall's home, which leads to a dangerous confrontation with Kendall and Liam Fitzpatrick. When Cormac is released from prison, Keith reunites the two, trying to escape from Liam Fitzpatrick with the money Kendall received from Phoenix Land Trust. As Keith leaves the two, Cormac shoots and kills Kendall and tries to attack Keith, who escapes. Keith believes he got Kendall killed and feels guilty since he and Kendall had formed a cordial relationship while he was working for her. He goes back to the crime scene with the police, but neither Kendall nor Cormac's body are found, who is believed to have been killed by Liam for not giving up the money.

==== Richard "Big Dick" Casablancas ====
David Starzyk portrays Richard "Big Dick" Casablancas Sr., Cassidy and Dick's father. Richard marries Kendall to be a trophy wife and openly favors Dick over Cassidy. When Veronica discovers that he has committed real estate fraud and tells the U.S. Securities and Exchange Commission (SEC), Richard flees the country before he can be arrested.

Richard reappears as a recurring character in season 4. It's revealed he did a stint in prison after the SEC finally caught him.

==== Terrence Cook ====
Jeffrey Sams portrays Terrence Cook, an ex-major-league baseball player, gambler, and Jackie's formerly estranged father. He's introduced in season 2 along with Jackie. Terrence is initially suspected of causing a bus crash that killed several Neptune High students in the season 2 premiere.

==== Echolls family ====
===== Aaron Echolls =====
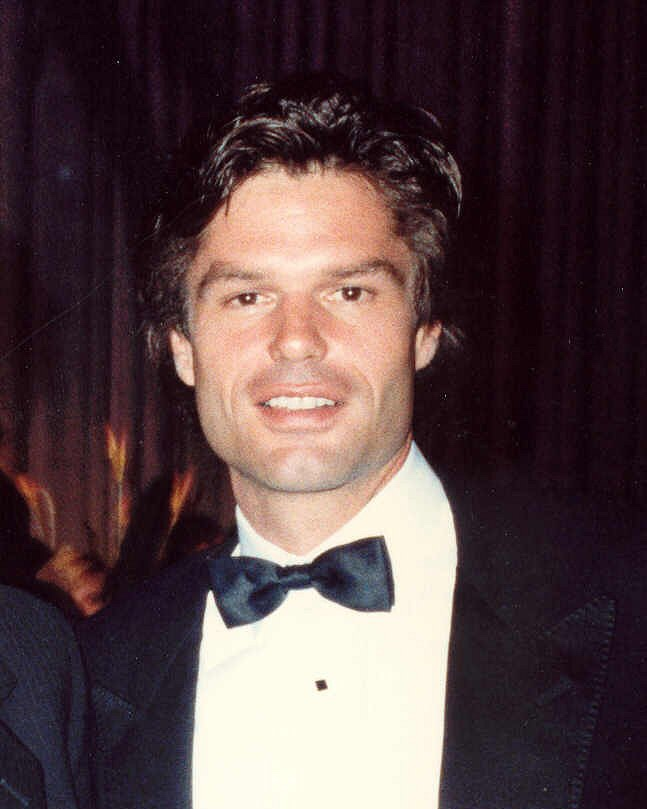
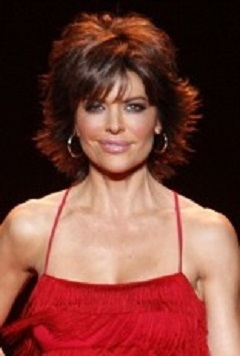
Harry Hamlin (left) and Lisa Rinna (right) are married in the series and in real life.

Harry Hamlin plays Aaron Echolls, an Oscar-winning A-list actor and is the main antagonist during the season 1 finale. At the beginning of the series, Aaron is married to his second wife, Lynn, with a son Logan. He adopted his daughter Trina while married to his previous wife. Aaron has numerous female fans due to his impressive physique and good looks. While Aaron is beloved by the American public, in real life, he is very different. Aaron cheats on his wife, and easily angered, he physically abuses Logan, but tolerates Trina. Aaron quits acting when Lynn commits suicide and tries to reconcile with Logan and Trina. Upon learning that Trina's boyfriend is physically abusing her, he beats the boy, threatening more if the boy ever returned. When Veronica exposes him as the man who killed Lilly, Aaron is indicted and held without bail. Logan visits his father in a holding cell after new evidence implicates Logan in a murder case. Aaron claims that he is innocent and tries to convince his son that he had been wrongfully accused. Logan, who despises his father, does not believe Aaron's story but recognizes that the evidence against Aaron is circumstantial at best. Later, Kendall visits Aaron in prison, and he agrees to invest in Phoenix Land Trust if she gets some of Duncan's hair. Aaron uses the hair to plant false evidence implying Duncan committed the crime, and Aaron is acquitted. He goes to the Neptune Grand and has sex with Kendall. While she is in the shower, Clarence Wiedman appears and kills Aaron with a silenced pistol on Duncan's orders.

===== Lynn Echolls =====
Lisa Rinna portrays Lynn Echolls, Logan's mother and Trina's stepmother. Lynn was a famous movie star who was married to Aaron Echolls, an even bigger movie star. Lynn tried to ignore Aaron's abuse of Logan by turning to alcohol and pills. After Aaron received several threatening letters, Lynn turned to Keith to discover who was behind them. It turned out to be a caterer who had seen Aaron having an affair at a party, and he had her fired. At the Echolls's Christmas party, the caterer knifed Aaron in the gut. Aaron recovered and hired Keith to find out who was leaking stories of his many infidelities to the press, only to discover Lynn. When Aaron confronted Lynn, she said that she wanted to hurt him as he hurt her, went back to her car, took some pills, and drove away. Her car was found abandoned on the Coronado Bridge. She had jumped, but no body was found. Even after the funeral, Logan refused to believe that his mother was dead. He thought she left him clues that she was still alive (e.g.: leaving behind a lighter engraved with "Free At Last" that she always kept in her purse) and that she was faking her death to get away from Aaron. Logan hired Veronica to prove his mother was alive; however, a video filmed by a freshman and his friends who were making a movie showed jumping from the bridge in the background, the exact time it was believed Lynn had jumped. Logan finally realizes that she's gone due to the video's evidence and after discovering that Trina was the one using his mother's credit cards. With all hope gone of his mother being alive, he breaks down crying in Veronica's arms. Later, when Lynn's will was read, it was discovered she had recently altered it, cutting Aaron out and leaving everything to Logan. Trina initially thought she had been cut out, too, only to be informed that she had not been left anything before it was altered.

===== Trina Echolls =====
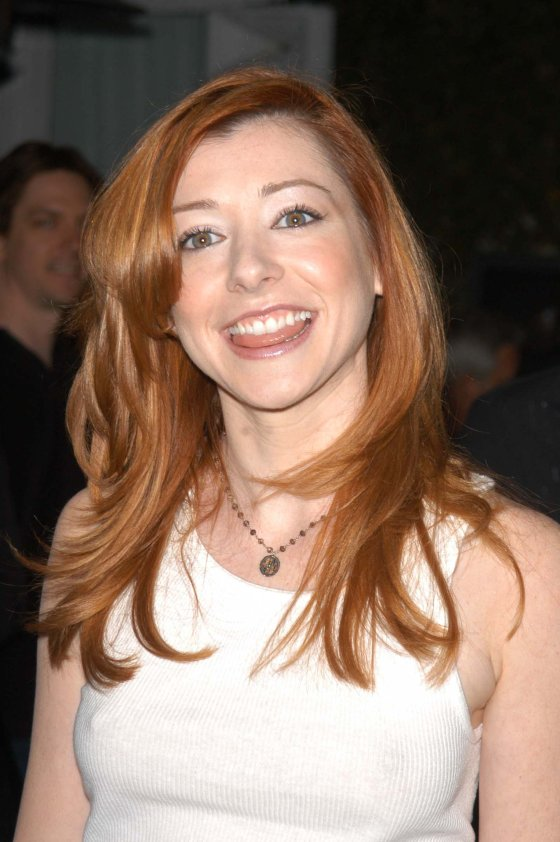
Rob Thomas said it was hard to write an episode featuring Hannigan because of her busy schedule.

Alyson Hannigan plays Trina Echolls, Logan's adopted sister and a struggling actress. She is first mentioned by Aaron in "Clash of the Tritons", who says that she is the only one who will talk to him. Logan asks Veronica to investigate his mother's death, and they discover Trina is staying at the Neptune Grand. The film Trina had been shooting in Australia had not worked out, and she had decided to return home. Trina moves back into the house and gets into trouble with money after borrowing money from her boyfriend, Dylan. She asks Logan for a loan; however, he does not give her any money. Because Trina can't pay Dylan, he beats her to which Logan finds out about after seeing her limp and has a black eye. Once Dylan arrives to talk to Aaron about starring in his movie, Aaron confronts him and beats him.

In "My Mother, the Fiend" Trina returns to Neptune as the "Special Celebrity Director" of the school play. During this time, Veronica investigates the case of a baby left in the bathroom of Neptune High during the prom of 1980. She believes Celeste Kane is the mother and wants her to own up to abandoning the child. Veronica eventually discovers Trina was the prom baby and tells Trina the truth, excited at the thought of inheriting some of Celeste's wealth. The next day at school, Veronica and Trina talk when Mary, the deaf lunch lady, begins pointing to herself and then to Trina. Veronica eventually deciphers her sign language: Mary is Trina's biological mother. It turns out then-student Mary had an affair with a teacher, and she left baby Trina at his doorstep. He then left the baby in the bathroom at the prom, knowing they would think it belonged to a student. It turned out the teacher was the current principal, Alan Moorehead. Trina busts him in the middle of a staff meeting in front of all the other teachers, and he is fired.

As a result of Hannigan's busy schedule, several of her storylines had to be swapped between episodes. Thomas said that he "loved having Alyson in the show" and had "a lot of fun with her".

==== Alicia Fennel ====
Erica Gimpel portrays Alicia Fennel, Wallace's mother, dated Keith Mars at the end of season one and season two. Alicia later breaks up with Keith after he tried to investigate her past with Wallace's biological father.

==== Kane family ====
===== Jake Kane =====
Kyle Secor recurs as Jake Kane, Lilly and Duncan's father, a software billionaire. He is Lianne Mars' sweetheart in high school and was having an affair with her at the start of season one. Jake invented streaming video, making him one of the most influential men in Neptune, California via his software company, Kane Software. When Veronica interviews Abel Koontz, he suggests that Veronica is Jake's biological daughter rather than Keith's because Jake and Lianne once dated while in high school. Keith later has a paternity test and is proved to be Veronica's biological father. Jake returns in the series finale as a member of the secret society "The Castle".

===== Celeste Kane =====
Lisa Thornhill plays Celeste Kane, Lilly and Duncan's mother. Celeste loathed Veronica because of her husband's affair with Veronica's mother. She disapproved of Veronica and Duncan's relationship and told Duncan that Veronica could have been his half-sister because of Jake's affair with Lianne. This caused Duncan to break up with Veronica. Before Lilly died, Celeste had shown resentment towards her daughters' way of life and blamed every problem her family faced on Lilly. In "Donut Run", her last appearance, she hired Vinnie Van Lowe to find Duncan.

===== Lilly Kane =====
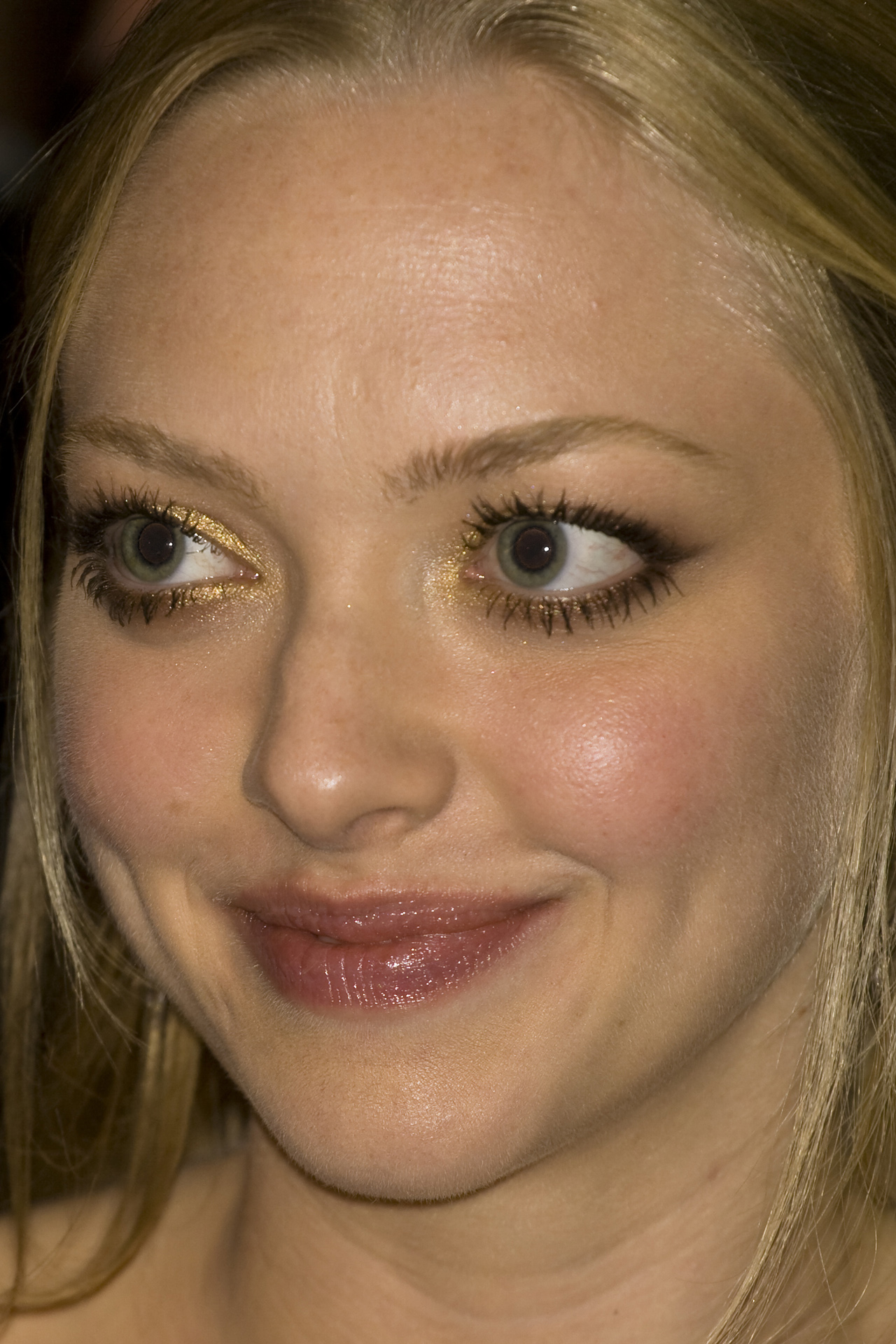
Thomas felt that Seyfried was so good in the series that he used her three or four more times than he initially planned.

Amanda Seyfried portrays Lilly Kane, Duncan's older sister, Veronica's best friend, and Logan's girlfriend. Lilly was the daughter of Jake and Celeste Kane. She was murdered on October 3, 2003 – roughly eleven months before the show's first episode. Abel Koontz, a disgruntled employee, fired from Jake's firm, confessed to the crime and was awaiting execution. Lilly is seen on the show throughout a series of flashbacks and Veronica's daydreams, which portray her as a fun, wild, and stylish teenage girl. She was best friend to Veronica, who was dating Lilly's brother, Duncan. Before her death, Lilly had been dating Logan but had also been in a relationship with Eli "Weevil" Navarro, as Lilly did not like to be tied down. Lilly's murder changes Veronica's life completely, being the catalyst for a series of events that include Veronica's father Keith losing his job, Veronica's mother Lianne leaving town, and all of Veronica's friends abandoning her. Through the first season, Veronica investigates Lilly's murder and finds that nothing is what it seems. All three of the Kanes falsified their alibis, and Lilly's time of death was three hours off. Clarence Wiedman, the head of security for Kane Software, called in the tip that caused Abel Koontz to be arrested.

In the episode "Leave It to Beaver" Veronica and Duncan discover several videotapes in Lilly's bedroom. They show Lilly in bed with Aaron, Logan's father. Veronica realizes that Aaron killed Lilly to get the tapes back. When Duncan found her body, he went into a catatonic state. When his parents discovered him reeling over Lilly's dead body, they assumed he had killed Lilly in an epileptic seizure. To protect their son, they began an elaborate cover-up of the murder. However, before Veronica can take the tapes to the police, Aaron tries to kill her. After a chase, Keith arrives, and he manages to subdue Aaron, and he is arrested. Later that night, Veronica has a dream about Lilly. The two of them are floating in a lily-covered pool. Leaning back and smiling, Veronica declared this was the way things were supposed to be and how they would be from now on. Lilly smiles sadly and replies, "You know how things are going to be from now on, don't you? You have to know." She then asks Veronica not to forget about her, and Veronica turns to see that Lilly has disappeared and she is alone in the pool. Veronica promises that she could never forget her best friend. Lilly also appears as a hallucination in the season two premiere, "Normal Is the Watchword". Distracted by seeing Lilly, Veronica misses the bus and has to ride with Weevil back to town instead; the bus later crashes, and all aboard eventually die. Lilly returns for one last dream sequence in "Not Pictured", wherein Veronica's subconscious suggests that Lilly would have attended Vassar had she lived. As high-spirited as ever, Lilly brags about her sexual experiments and promises Veronica will understand once she goes to college. A painting of Lilly is seen in the season 3 finale as an homage to the character.

Thomas described Seyfried as "the biggest surprise of the year". When casting Lilly Kane, who would only appear occasionally as "the dead girl", Thomas did not receive the same level of actors who auditioned for the role of a series regular. Thomas said that he had "never had a more cut and dry audition" than he did with Seyfried. He said that she was "about 100 times better than anyone else that we saw; she was just spectacular". He said that she ended up being so good in the series that he used her three or four more times than he initially planned.

==== Lianne Mars ====
Corinne Bohrer recurs as Lianne Mars, Veronica's estranged and alcoholic mother. Lianne was the high school sweetheart of Jake Kane, who she believed was Veronica's father. At Neptune High, Lianne Reynolds was credited to being a gossip and a friend to the deaf girl, Mary, who was later revealed to be the biological mother of Trina Echolls. Lianne later marries Keith; however, she has an affair with Jake. After the Lilly Kane murder is made public, Lianne develops a drinking problem and leaves town. When she returns, claiming to want to fix her problems, Veronica spends all of her college savings to enter her mother into rehab. Lianne returns to stay, seemingly sober; however, Veronica finds out that Lianne did not finish rehab. Veronica asks Lianne to leave, who steals the $50,000 settlement Veronica received from the Kanes on her way out. Lianne reappeared in Veronica's dream, where Lilly was never murdered, and Lianne is the perfect mother.

==== Charlie Stone ====
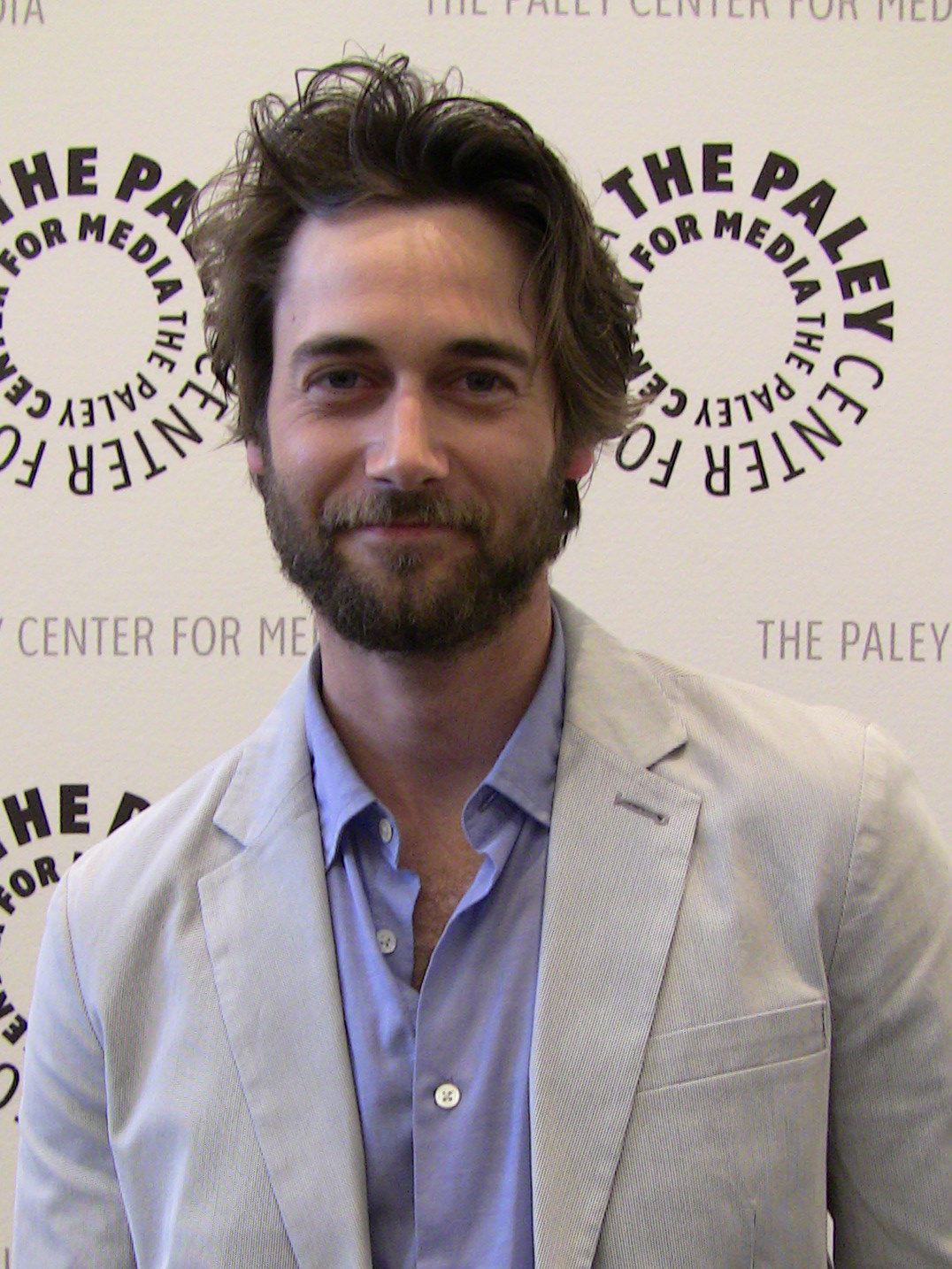
Ryan Eggold played Logan's real half-brother.

Ryan Eggold guest stars as Charlie Stone, Logan's half-brother and Aaron's son. When Logan asks Veronica to investigate his rapidly declining trust fund, she uncovers that Logan's father, movie star Aaron, had an illegitimate child. To keep this fact a secret from the tabloids, Aaron arranged for his accountant to deposit $10,000 a month from the Echolls estate into a fake charity set up to funnel the money to his son. After learning this information, Logan reaches out to his half-brother, finding a confidante and potential friend. Veronica continues her investigation to discover that the person Logan believes to be his half-brother (Matt Czuchry) is a writer for Vanity Fair who posed as Charlie Stone to get Logan to share personal details about growing up in the Echolls home. The real Charlie Stone refused to answer the reporter's questions, preferring to remain anonymous. Logan, believing that Charlie set up the reporter, reveals his brother's identity on Larry King Live in an attempt to scoop the magazine profile. After Veronica informs him that the real Charlie had nothing to do with the reporter, Logan tearfully contacts his half-brother again.

==== Nathan Woods ====
Cress Williams appears as Nathan Woods, Wallace's biological father with a shady past as an undercover cop.

==== Claudia Navarro ====
Onahoua Rodriguez recurs as Claudia Navarro, Weevil's sister, who begins a relationship with Alonzo.

==== Maloof family ====
===== Amalia Maloof =====
Jacqueline Antaramian portrays Amalia Maloof, Daniel and Alex's mother. She disapproved of Alex's engagement to Tawny Carr, going as far as offering to pay her off. She later hires Vinnie Van Lowe to find the ring Alex proposed with, which was a family heirloom.

===== Alex Maloof =====
Paul Karmiryan portrays Alex Maloof, Daniel's younger brother. Introduced in season 4, Alex was a victim of one of the bombings who survived. His parents disapproved of his fiancée Tawny Carr, who died in one of the bombings.

=== Residents of Neptune ===
==== Steve Batando ====
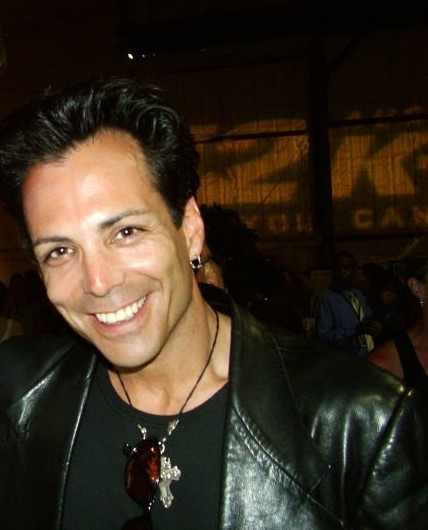
Richard Grieco portrays Steve Batando.

Richard Grieco portrays Steve Batando, a struggling actor and drug addict, as well as Mindy O'Dell's ex-husband, in season three. He killed Sheriff Don Lamb with a bat then was shot and killed by Sacks.

==== Harmony Chase ====
Laura San Giacomo recurs as Harmony Chase, a married woman with whom Keith becomes romantically involved.

==== Leo D'Amato ====
Max Greenfield recurs as Leo D'Amato, introduced as the new Sheriff's Deputy, Veronica befriends. Without his consent, Veronica steals a recording of an anonymous tip implicating Abel Koontz in Lilly Kane's death from the evidence room. Leo is shortly suspended for the break-in, and when Veronica attempts to apologize, he is reluctant to forgive her. When Veronica admits she has fallen for him, he dismisses the claim; however, they kiss during her school dance. When Veronica secretly begins to date Logan, she confesses the affair to Leo and ends the relationship. The pair manage to remain on good terms, and Leo assists Veronica in breaking up a dognapping ring the same night she breaks up with him. To get enough money to send his little sister with Down syndrome to a private school, Leo steals and sells the Aaron Echolls and Lilly Kane sex tapes to Logan. Logan promptly destroys the recordings due to their traumatic nature; however, he inadvertently compromises the pending case against Aaron. Keith discovers Leo's participation in the theft; however, he covers for him by stating that the tapes were stolen because Leo was not at his post. Leo is promptly fired from the sheriff's department, but is able to keep the money that Logan paid him to help his sister. Leo begins working for a private security company and finds himself working for Woody Goodman's daughter Gia. Leo contacts Keith when he is concerned that his security company's warehouse is about to be robbed. Leo loses his job for involving Keith, although Keith asks him to return as a deputy. Greenfield reprises his role in the fourth season, where it is revealed that he has since joined the FBI and returns to Neptune to aid in the Spring Break bombing case.

==== Liam Fitzpatrick ====
Rodney Rowland plays Liam Fitzpatrick, a formidable Irish-Catholic gangster and drug dealer. Liam is in charge of the Fitzpatrick mafia family, also known as the Fighting Fitzpatricks. He shoots his brother, Cormac, in cold blood after Cormac fails to retrieve an original Van Gogh painting. It has been hinted that he and his family are helping Vinnie Van Lowe win the election for Sheriff. Liam tells Keith that if Vinnie does not win the election, or if Keith does anything to hurt Vinnie's campaign, he will kill Veronica.

==== Woody Goodman ====
Steve Guttenberg portrays Woody Goodman, the Sharks baseball team owner and Balboa County Executive. More commonly known as the "Mayor of Neptune", although the position is actually "County Supervisor". At the end of season two, he is revealed to be a pedophile who molested several boys on his Little League teams, including Cassidy Casablancas. Woody was killed when explosives planted by Cassidy blew up his private plane.

==== Tom Griffith ====
Rick Peters plays Tom Griffith, a plastic surgeon and coke-addict who the Fitzpatricks asked to testify that Logan killed Felix. Logan retaliated by dating his daughter Hannah until he dropped his charges.

==== Abel Koontz ====
Christian Clemenson plays Abel Koontz, Lilly Kane's falsely confessed murderer. Koontz was the person at Kane software who perfected streaming media but was cheated out of the patent. He then tried to invent a technology that "would put Kane out of business", though he failed, and his wife walked out on him. Three months after Lilly's murder, Koontz confessed to murdering her. Lamb found Lilly's backpack and shoes while searching Abel's houseboat, backing up Koontz's confession. Until this point, Keith's investigation was squarely focused on the Kane family as suspects. It was Keith's failure to investigate Koontz that led to his eventual ousting as Neptune's sheriff. A year later, when Veronica started to investigate Lilly's murder, she visited Koontz on death row twice. During their first visit, Koontz quickly recognizes Veronica and reveals that Jake Kane may be her birth father. She was suspicious of Koontz's confession because he fired his attorney while on death row, and she discovered that the same shoes found in Koontz's houseboat were in Lilly's room at the time of the murder. Veronica sneaked into Koontz's doctor's office and stole both his and Duncan's medical files. She found out that Duncan had type-4 epilepsy, whose symptoms included violent outbursts and seizures. For the first time, Veronica realized that Duncan was a possible suspect in Lilly's murder. She also found out that Abel Koontz had stomach cancer and that he was dying. She concluded that Jake Kane paid Koontz to confess to the murder, even though he was not the perpetrator, so that Keith Mars' investigation into the Kane family would end. Koontz accepted the offer because he knew he was dying and intended to give the money to his daughter, Amelia DeLongpré, who he had neglected in the past. Veronica locates Abel's daughter to help prove that he is innocent, but Clarence Wiedman, head of Kane security, bribes her with three million dollars in exchange for her silence. During Veronica's second visit to Koontz, she told him that she knew that he was dying and that he was paid to confess to the murder. Koontz's innocence was further solidified when Keith went to Las Vegas to talk to a prostitute with Koontz at Lilly's murder. Koontz's final appearance was in the second-season episode "Rat Saw God". After being cleared of all murder charges and released from prison, he asks Veronica to help locate Amelia before he dies. While investigating, Veronica discovers that Amelia's boyfriend killed her after they blackmailed Clarence Wiedman for more money. Instead of telling him the truth, Veronica says that his daughter was happily living in Aspen and that she could not fly down yet because of the weather. He then dies at the end of the episode, but it is not shown.

==== Cliff McCormack ====
Daran Norris recurs as Cliff McCormack, a Public Defender and Mars family friend. Cliff is a public defender in Neptune who has served as an ally to Keith and Veronica Mars and a steady client of Mars Investigations. Although rarely a key player in the series, he has had some notable and memorable appearances. In "The Rapes of Graff", Cliff was seduced by an escort hired by Aaron Echolls to steal Cliff's briefcase, which contained the Logan Echolls murder case files and keys to the storage locker containing Aaron's personal belongings, including an Oscar statue. Norris reprises his role in the fourth season, where he assists Mars Investigations in the Spring Break bombing case.

==== Mindy O'Dell ====
Jaime Ray Newman appears as Mindy O'Dell, Dean O'Dell's wife. Mindy and Cyrus share no children of their own, but parent Cyrus' adolescent son from a previous marriage and Mindy's younger son by her first husband, Steven Batando. In "President Evil", the O'Dells hire Keith to find Steven in the hopes that his bone marrow would be a match to that of his biological son, who has been diagnosed with leukemia. Keith locates Steven, who refuses to donate his marrow. When Batando later disappears, Keith suspects that the O'Dells kidnapped him and took the marrow donation against his will but looked the other way. In "Hi, Infidelity", Veronica finds Mindy sharing a hotel room with Hank, her criminology professor at Hearst College, and an employee of Cyrus'. Keith puts Mindy under surveillance after Cyrus hired him to find out if she's having an affair. Keith discovers no cheating, but Veronica reveals Landry's infidelity to her father, Keith, who tells it to Cyrus. Cyrus confides in Keith, saying that Mindy was too young and too beautiful, and their marriage had been doomed to fail. Mindy is preparing to leave Landry in the Neptune Grand hotel room they shared when Cyrus enters and confronts them both about the affair, brandishing a loaded pistol. When Cyrus is found shot to death in his office, the insurance company rules his death a suicide, leaving the O'Dell family with no compensation for the loss of income, in "Spit & Eggs". Mindy returns to Keith Mars and hires him to prove that Cyrus was murdered in "Show Me the Monkey". Mindy finally gets the insurance money from her husband's murder, buys a boat, and leaves town after being questioned by Acting Sheriff Keith Mars. Hank Landry catches up with Mindy on her boat, and he later confesses to accidentally killing her the night before being found, in "Papa's Cabin".

==== Vinnie Van Lowe ====
Ken Marino recurs as Vincent "Vinnie" Van Lowe, Keith's rival private investigator. Vinnie is a private investigator in Neptune and is the main competition for Keith and Veronica. Vinnie has rather lax moral standards and is often willing to take on cases that the Mars Investigation team would refuse. It is because of this that he has a much larger caseload than the Mars family. The cases that Vinnie Van Lowe takes on have sometimes helped the Mars family, but sometimes his work has been in opposition to Mars Investigations' cases. In "Kanes and Abel's", Veronica is attempting to find out who has been harassing Sabrina Fuller, the School Board President's daughter and one of the top candidates for the Kane Scholarship. The Kane Scholarship is a full scholarship named Lilly's honor, awarded to the valedictorian of Neptune High. In her investigation, Veronica discovers that one of the cars that was used during a harassment was owned by Vinnie Van Lowe's ex-wife, Debra Villareal. From this, she figured out that Vinnie Van Lowe was the person hired to harass Sabrina. In "Donut Run", Van Lowe was hired by Celeste Kane to watch Veronica because Celeste suspected that Veronica knew where Duncan took the kidnapped baby. Veronica was able to take advantage of Vinnie's willingness to change clients if he is offered a better deal. Veronica had Duncan offer Vinnie more money to drive the Manning baby and a Veronica look-alike over the Mexican border and pick Duncan up in Mexico. It was because of this that Duncan was able to escape authorities with the kidnapped baby successfully. In "Not Pictured", Vinnie and Keith team up to catch Woody Goodman. Vinnie had broken into the Goodman house and stole all their records. Vinnie was arrested but got away with the records. Using his one phone call, he meets with Keith to get him to split the bounty. Vinnie gives the records, and Keith gets the man. In "Welcome Wagon", he almost gets Keith killed while working for Liam Fitzpatrick. However, in "Of Vice and Men", Vinnie rescued Veronica and Meryl from danger from the Fitzpatricks when the two girls wander into the River Stix searching for Meryl's missing boyfriend. Marino reprises his role in the fourth season, where he is assigned by Congressman Daniel Maloof's mother Amalia to recover a family heirloom.

==== Clarence Weidman ====
Christopher B. Duncan recurs as Clarence Wiedman, the Head of Security at Kane Software. He kills Aaron Echolls at the end of season two on Duncan's orders. As Head of Security for Kane Software, Wiedman is known to do the less-than-savory jobs that Jake Kane needs to be done. It is known that Jake Kane called Wiedman before he reported his daughter's murder. Veronica speculates that he assisted in the cover-up of Lilly's actual time of death by lowering her body's temperature. It is known that Wiedman paid Amelia de Longpre so that her father, Abel Koontz, would falsely confess to the murder of Lilly. When Veronica found Amelia and tried to convince her to reveal the existence of the payoff money, Wiedman got to her first and gave her even more money so that she would leave Neptune, in "Kanes and Abel's". Wiedman also called in the anonymous tip that got Abel Koontz arrested and took photos of Veronica that were sent to Lianne Mars in "You Think You Know Somebody". Unfortunately, Amelia DeLongpre didn't stay away long. When Abel tried to get Veronica to find his daughter, Veronica found out that she had called Kane Software from a payphone across the street and confronted Wiedman about it. Later on, when Veronica found her body, Clarence was there and confessed that Amelia had asked for more money. As it turned out, it was Amelia's new boyfriend, Carlos Mercado, who had wanted the money, and after he got it, he killed Amelia. Wiedman traced the money to Las Vegas, and it was implied that he killed Carlos in "Rat Saw God". Wiedman made another appearance when Aaron was acquitted. In "Not Pictured" Aaron's hotel room, Clarence assassinated him with two bullets. Afterward, he called Duncan in Australia, who asked, "CW?" Wiedman responded, "It's a done deal." Duncan reprises his role in the fourth season episode "Entering a World of Pain" as Logan's replacement security detail for Congressman Daniel Maloof.

==== Penn Epner ====
Patton Oswalt recurs in season four as Penn Epner, a delivery guy for Cho's Pizza and true crime enthusiast who also teams with Mars Investigations to solve the Spring Break bombing case.

==== Nicole Malloy ====
Kirby Howell-Baptiste recurs in season four as Nicole Malloy, a friend of Veronica and owner of a Neptune nightclub.

==== Clyde Pickett ====
J. K. Simmons recurs in season four as Clyde Pickett, an ex-con working as a fixer for Richard Casablancas and a friend of Keith.

==== Marcia Langdon ====
Dawnn Lewis recurs in season four as Marcia Langdon, Neptune's chief of police.

=== Neptune High ===
==== Alan Moorehead ====
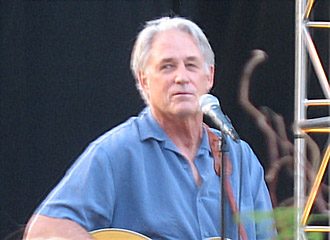
John Bennett Perry played Alan Moorehead

John Bennett Perry plays Alan Moorehead, the principal of Neptune High. When Moorehead was a teacher, he had an affair with then-student Mary, and she left their baby Trina Echolls at his doorstep. He then left the baby in the bathroom at the prom, knowing they would think it belonged to a student. Many years later, when Veronica discovers that he is Trina's father, Moorehead is fired as principal.

==== Van Clemmons ====
Duane Daniels plays Van Clemmons, the vice principal and later principal of Neptune High. During high school, Veronica continually gets into trouble and, as a result, regularly meets with Clemmons. Occasionally, Van Clemmons asks Veronica for help, once asking her to locate the missing school mascot. Clemmons is the one who instructs Veronica to organize some old files, which led to her discovering Moorehead as Trina Echolls' father. When Moorehead is fired as principal, Veronica realizes that Clemmons' plan was all along to become principal. Clemmons says that when Veronica graduates, he cannot decide if his life will be easier or more difficult with her gone. Clemmons reappears in "Un-American Graffiti", where he is caught on tape being shot with a paintball gun by several Neptune High students. He reappears in the film at the reunion where he admits to Veronica that life has been boring since she graduated and makes a brief appearance in the fourth season.

==== Butters Clemmons ====
Adam Hendershott portrays Vincent "Butters" Clemmons, a student at Neptune High and Van Clemmons' son. When he was a freshman, Vincent was pantsed by a bully and named "Butters". Vincent vowed revenge, and that following fall, the jock who had humiliated him and those who did nothing to save him, found themselves having failed mandatory drug tests, essentially barring them from playing sports in their final year of high school. Veronica believed Butters to be behind the crime; however, she discovered the real culprits were a conclave of parents who rigged the drug tests so that their children could gain the spots opened up in the wake of the mass suspension of athletes. Later, when Butters' only friend Marcos Oliveres was killed in the bus crash, and his parents sued the school, Veronica thought Butters was targeting the family, leaving them reminders of their son to torment the parents. She discovers that Butters and Marcos secretly ran the local pirate radio station, "Ahoy, Mateys!", which was infamous for its vicious slandering of the popular cliques at school. Butters tells Veronica that he had little contact with Marcos since the summer when he returned from summer camp and quit the radio show without telling Butters why. Veronica later found out summer camp was an anti-gay camp he was sent to and that the real culprit was Marcos' friend Ryan, who had a crush on Marcos and who sought to make the Oliveres suffer the same way they made their son suffer in regards to his potential homosexuality. Butters develops a crush on Mac, much to her disgust, and she is forced to attend Logan's "anti-prom" with him.

==== Lucky ====
James Jordan portrays Tommy "Lucky" Dohanic, a janitor at Neptune High, in season two. He previously acted as a batboy for Woody Goodman's baseball team, the Sharks. He later stalked Woody's daughter Gia and was later arrested when he attempted to attack her. However, the Mannings bailed Lucky out of jail, and he returned to the school the following day with a toy pistol, searching for Gia. After firing several (blank) bullets, including one at Wallace, he was shot and killed by school security.

==== Corny ====
Jonathan Chesner portrays Douglas "Corny", a stoner and occasional ally of Veronica's. Corny is in the same graduation class as Veronica. Corny makes the bong that Veronica plants in Logan's locker in "Pilot". Resident stoner of Neptune High. Works at Cho's Pizza as a deliveryman. When he is mugged and tasered in "Versatile Toppings" he helps Veronica find the culprit. He appears to have somewhat of a crush on Veronica, as seen in "Blast from the Past" when he nominates her for Neptune High's Homecoming Queen. He was the DJ in between the Faders's sets at the Homecoming dance senior year. He is very proud of his brownie recipe, claiming that "it's all in the butter". He appears to go to Logan's Alterna-Prom alone.

==== Hannah Griffith ====
Jessy Schram plays Hannah Griffith, an "09er" high-school sophomore student at Neptune High. Hannah meets Logan at the school carnival and is surprised when he asks her out. Logan reveals to Hannah that her father, plastic surgeon Dr. Thomas Griffith, is a cocaine user. He tells her that he is protecting his dealers, the Fitzpatricks, and has falsely testified against Logan in a murder trial. Hannah decides that she cannot trust Logan because he is only dating her to get to her father, but she is quick to forgive him. When her father catches her being undressed by Logan, he sends Hannah to a Vermont boarding school.

==== Deborah Hauser ====
Kari Coleman portrays Deborah Hauser, a divorced sex education teacher with a bitter approach to her students, disliking all non-09ers and kissing ass to the 09ers. Veronica baby-sits her demonic son to find out if he is being abused. It is also revealed she was friends with Lianne Mars when they attended Neptune High as teenagers and were suspended together for spreading a "false and malicious rumor". Mrs. Hauser maintained that Lianne told her a rumor, knowing it was false, and Deborah passing it on unknowingly; however, Veronica found out the real story. Lianne's friend had an affair with a teacher at the school and became pregnant, and not knowing how to help, she confided in Deborah, who passed the gossip around. This baby would end up being Trina Echolls. Mrs. Hauser makes another appearance during the Winter Carnival at school, where she steals money from the cashbox and tries to blame Veronica and Jackie. However, she is caught and deservedly fired.

==== Rebecca James ====
Paula Marshall portrays Rebecca James, the school guidance counselor who briefly dated Keith Mars. Paula had previously worked with series creator Rob Thomas on his earlier series, Cupid. Veronica disapproves of their relationship and digs up information on her to change Keith's mind – information being Ms. James was arrested for passing bad checks when she was 21. Ms. James and Veronica's relationship is strained because of this, although she does try to help Veronica discover the meaning of her haunting dreams in the second season.

==== Meg Manning ====
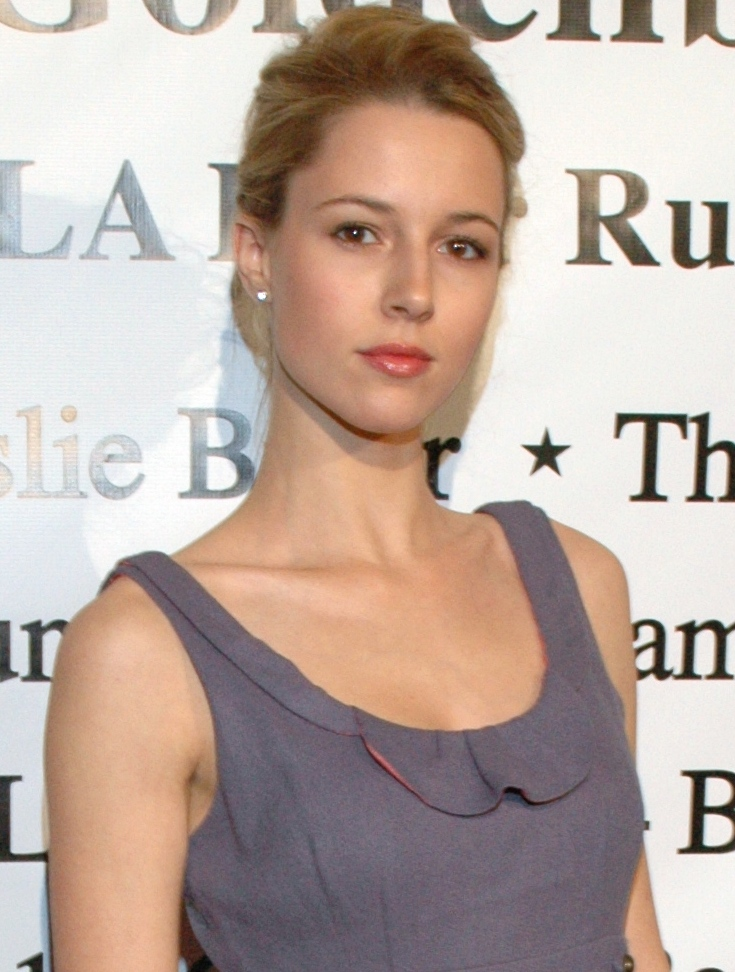
Alona Tal auditioned for Veronica Mars's role and was Rob Thomas' second choice. Thomas created the recurring role of Meg Manning specifically for her.

Alona Tal recurs as Meg Manning, an "09er" cheerleader and the daughter of mentally abusive fundamentalist Christian parents. She initially appears when Veronica is the victim of a nasty prank, lends her clothes, and sticks up for her when other 09ers start insulting her. When an online purity test posts all the participants' results, Meg's is faked to be unusually low, and she instantly gets a reputation as a slut. Veronica finds the person responsible for making this up about Meg (in "Like a Virgin"). When Meg asks Veronica to help find her secret admirer, she is keen to help, until she finds out that her secret admirer is Duncan Kane, Veronica's ex-boyfriend. Eventually, Veronica accepts Meg and Duncan's relationship. ("Ruskie Business") After finding out that he is not Veronica's half-brother, Duncan breaks up with Meg, who blames Veronica. Afterward, Meg's attitude towards Veronica is openly hostile. On the way back from a field trip to a baseball ground, while Veronica talked to Weevil during a rest stop, Meg deliberately implied that Veronica had returned to the bus, causing it to leave without her. However, the bus subsequently careened off a cliff and into the ocean. ("Normal Is the Watchword")

Meg was the only survivor, but she remained in a coma for much of the second season. Meg has two younger sisters, Lizzie and Grace. While Meg was in a coma, Lizzie brought Duncan Meg's laptop, asking him to remove Meg's files from the system before her parents were able to check them. Duncan and Veronica found that Meg had compiled information about a child whom she often babysat. His parents were abusing the young boy. Soon, the two uncovered that the abused child (who was referred to by Meg as a boy) was Meg's youngest sister, Grace. Meg's parents are religious zealots who lock Grace in a closet when they are out and make her fill out exercise book after exercise book with the phrase: "The path of God is paved with righteousness." Duncan and Veronica found dozens of these books in Grace's room. Veronica visited Meg in the hospital and discovered that Meg was pregnant with Duncan's child, which was why she was so mad at Veronica. Shortly after she left, Meg awoke from her coma. ("My Mother, the Fiend") Meg later apologizes to Veronica for her harsh treatment towards her and makes her promise not to let the baby end up with her parents if something happens to her. Later that same episode, Meg died of a blood clot to the heart, but not before giving birth to her daughter Faith, whom Duncan later renaming Lilly after fleeing the country with her.

==== Thumper ====
James Molina plays Eduardo "Thumper" Orozco, a PCH biker who betrays Weevil and starts dealing drugs for the Irish gang, the Fitzpatricks. He stabs Felix Toombs under orders from Liam Fitzpatrick for dating Liam's niece and sets up Logan as the culprit. Weevil later realizes Thumper did it, but can't prove it, so he sets up Thumper to make it look like stealing drugs and money from the Fitzpatricks. Liam and his cousin Danny Boyd lock Thumper inside "Shark Stadium" along with his bike, shortly before the building is blown up in a controlled demolition.

==== Carrie Bishop ====
Leighton Meester plays Carrie Bishop, nicknamed the queen of gossip at Neptune High. She appeared in two episodes. She was known for faking an affair with a teacher who Veronica strongly thought was innocent. The teacher found that he had a relationship with a previous student who had his baby, whom he denied and left. That student was the reason why Carrie had made these accusations. She also appeared in a later episode when Veronica is searching for the one responsible for raping her at Shelly Pomeroy's party. Carrie had told her that Duncan Kane was the one she saw with Veronica in the bedroom. Andrea Estella replaced Meester in Carrie's role for the Veronica Mars film, centering around the death of the character. Before the film, Carrie became a self-destructive pop star under the name Bonnie DeVille and began a relationship with Logan. Their relationship turned sour, and Carrie started attending Alcoholics Anonymous meetings with now ex-boyfriend Logan as her sponsor. At the start of the film, she was found dead in her bathtub.

==== Samuel Pope ====
Michael Kostroff portrays Samuel Pope, the teacher of Future Business Leaders of America and one of Neptune's few ethical people. After making a small fortune from real estate investment in Big Dick Casablancas' firm, he plans to retire to a life of sailing during the second season. Veronica discovers that the company is defrauding the investors and encourages Mr. Pope to get rid of his stock before she reports it, but he sadly replies he cannot do this; to get rid of it, he would have to sell it to someone else, and they would pay the price. He sadly admits he cannot do that and cannot retire as planned. It is assumed he continues teaching at Neptune High.

==== Madison Sinclair ====
Amanda Noret plays Madison Sinclair, Dick's ex-girlfriend and Neptune High's resident bitch. Shortly after Lilly's murder, at Shelly Pomeroy's party, Dick dosed Madison's drink with GHB to loosen her up; however, Madison spat in the drink, which she calls "A Trip to the Dentist", and gave it to Veronica. Veronica drank the soda and later had sex with Duncan, who had also unknowingly ingested GHB (given to him by Logan). The following year, Madison rigged the school election to get Duncan Kane elected to student body president. Veronica exposed the plot, which resulted in Madison losing her place on the student council and the position's special privileges. Veronica discovers in Season One that Madison was switched at birth with Mac. It is shown that Madison continually argues with her family. In contrast, Mac's parents have entirely accepted Mac as their daughter and have shown no signs of wanting anything to do with Madison. After breaking up with Dick, she is secretly involved with Sheriff Don Lamb ("The Rapes of Graff"). Veronica discovers this and mocks Madison about her relationship with Lamb in front of their classmates through innuendo that, while her classmates do not understand, had a meaning that was quite apparent to Madison.

Madison, having gone off to college at USC, is absent from much of Veronica's life at Hearst, until she had several run-ins with her in Neptune in the episode "Poughkeepsie, Tramps and Thieves". Veronica first sees Madison when she arrived unexpectedly at Neptune Grand Suite shared by Logan and Dick; thinking that Madison was simply looking up her ex, Veronica sent her on her way. Later, however, she ran into her again at a lingerie shop where Madison maliciously let slip that she had spent the night with Logan while in Aspen over Christmas break Veronica and Logan were split up. In the following episode, Veronica, consumed by images of Madison's affair with Logan, follows her and eventually plots with Weevil to have Madison's new car crushed and cubed. However, Veronica has a change of heart and asks him to return it unscathed, save for a can of tuna in her air conditioning.

Madison reappears in the Veronica Mars film, attending Neptune High's 10-year reunion. She plays a copy of Veronica and Piz's college sex tape in an attempt to humiliate her, which causes a fight to break out.

==== Felix Toombs ====
Brad Bufanda plays Felix Toombs, Weevil's right-hand man. Bufanda initially tried out for the role of Weevil. Felix is a PCH bike gang member and Weevil's best friend. After the PCH gang beat up Logan for supposedly killing Weevil's lover Lilly Kane, Logan wakes up beside Felix, stabbed to death. Weevil first suspects Logan but later finds out he is innocent and enlists his help to solve the case. Weevil finds out the PCHers had been dealing drugs for the Fitzpatricks behind his back during that time. Felix was secretly dating Molly Fitzpatrick (Liam Fitzpatrick's niece), so Liam ordered Felix's fellow gang member Thumper, who works for the Fitzpatricks, to kill Felix.

==== Troy Vandergraff ====
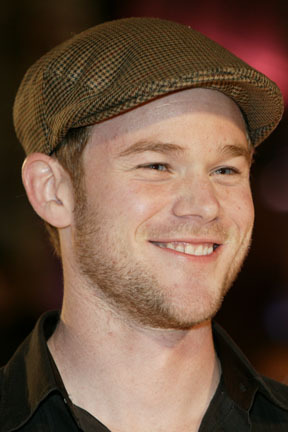
Ashmore enjoyed his reappearance in the second season, saying "it was kinda nice coming back and being the good guy and not the bad guy for once".

Aaron Ashmore portrays Troy Vandegraff, a childhood friend of Duncan's, Veronica's boyfriend, for the early stretch of season one. He betrays Veronica and leaves town, but he is somewhat reformed by the time they meet again later in the series. Troy and Veronica dated for a short time in Season One. Their relationship didn't last long because Troy involved an unwitting Veronica in a plot to smuggle steroids from Mexico into the US. Veronica managed to find out his intentions before completing his plan and running away with his real girlfriend. He later comes back in the episode "The Rapes of Graff" in Season 2, where he is accused of raping and shaving the head of a girl at Hearst College. Veronica ended up clearing Troy's name but did not find out who the real rapist is until the third season.

==== Jane Kuhne ====
Valorie Curry plays Jane Kuhne, student-athlete at Neptune High and Wallace's girlfriend after returning from Chicago. She is introduced in Season 1 while Wallace is pursuing Jackie as a distant admirer of Wallace who has been ignored. After Wallace returns from Chicago, he takes up with Jane. She is featured in the episode "The Quick and the Wed" when her older sister disappears following a bachelorette party, and Veronica investigates the disappearance.

=== Hearst College ===
==== Tom Barry ====
Matt McKenzie plays Tom Barry, Wallace's basketball coach and father of Josh Barry. He is allegedly murdered the night after a basketball game during which he fights with Josh, and the team loses the game. Josh is believed to be his killer due to the argument that Mason drove past the area where Coach Barry died and saw someone who appeared to be Josh with him. It is revealed that he was dying of an incurable brain disease that would be slow, painful, humiliating, and costly. He arranged for his suicide to appear as a carjacking so that his family would be paid life insurance (which they would not in the case of suicide) and take care of them financially.

==== Chip Diller ====
David Tom plays Chip Diller, the President of the Pi Sig frat house. He first appears in season two when Veronica visits Hearst, and she accuses him of raping a student. While it turns out he is not a rapist, he is shown to be still a horrible person. A group of campus feminists attacked him, shaved his head, and shoved an egg into his rectum on the anniversary of Patrice Pitrelli's attempted suicide for his part in it. During the episode "Spit & Eggs", Veronica points out to Chip that the beer coasters provided by the Pi Sig's were not sufficient since they were supposed to be used for drug testing, but he does not care. Chip is one of the foremost perpetrators in spreading the sex video of Veronica and Piz; however, it did not have anything to do with its creation.

==== Tim Foyle ====
James Jordan appears as Tim Foyle, a teaching assistant for Professor Hank Landry at Hearst College. Tim seems to dislike Veronica, possibly because Landry seems to prefer her over him. In the first session of Landry's criminology class (in "Welcome Wagon"), he has his students play a detective game, "Murder on the Riverboat Queen". Veronica beats Tim's record time for solving the mystery by ten minutes, then embarrasses and annoys him by saying, "There is one thing I can't figure out: what did you do with the extra ten minutes?" In "Hi, Infidelity", Tim accuses Veronica of plagiarizing her mid-term paper and gives her three days to clear herself. After Veronica figures out what happened, she accuses Tim of setting her up just so that she would discover that Landry was having an affair with Mindy O'Dell, the Dean's wife, but Tim does not explicitly deny it; instead, he says that if he HAD set the whole thing up, it would have been to show Veronica what Landry was really like before she became his protege. Tim is also the boyfriend of Bonnie Capistrano, Dick's fling, and is presumably the father of her miscarried baby. While investigating the truth behind Bonnie's miscarriage, she discovers that Tim was very supportive of her decision to have the baby and that he even asked Bonnie to marry him to please her religious parents. In "Papa's Cabin", Tim and Veronica team up in an attempt to clear Dr. Landry of the murder of Hearst College's Dean of Students, Cyrus O'Dell. At the end of the episode, however, it is revealed that Tim himself murdered Cyrus O'Dell to take revenge on Landry for ruining his chances at a job at (a fictional version of) Pepperdine University, by giving an unfavorable reference to the prospective employer. Tim's name is, in fact, a joke by the writers. His character was created as a foil for Veronica and was referred to as "Foil" during the early drafts. According to Rob Thomas on the DVD extras, they eventually decided to call him Foyle anyway, and Tim as his first name as a play on "tin foil". Jordan reprises his role in the fourth season episode "Heads You Lose", where Veronica visits him in prison.

==== Max ====
Adam Rose portrays Max, a geeky student who provides test answers for cash. While he started as a one-time guest star, he turned into a recurring character due to his likability. He makes a profit with his business and does not care when he is expelled from Hearst, planning to make his living from it anyway. Max comes to Veronica with the task of finding his dream girl whom he met at ComiCon and had an instant connection with, who left telling him she'd left her details in his hotel room, for him to return and find the hotel cleaners had already been and it had disappeared. It turned out that this girl was a hooker hired by his friends so that Max could lose his virginity; he decides to continue trying to find her even when he finds this out. Max convinced Chelsea to leave the prostitution business for him, and he pays off her $10,000 debt to her pimp. However, things are not the same when her past keeps being brought up; he finally asks whether she left her information, and Chelsea is heartbroken when he realizes she did not – "But I really wish I had." She leaves but promises to pay him back – it is implied that she is making her money by stripping. Max comes back into the series as Mac's new boyfriend after she breaks up with Bronson for him. Rose reprises his role in the fourth season episode "Heads You Lose".

==== Mercer Hayes ====
Ryan Devlin recurs as Mercer Hayes, a friend of Logan and Dick, who runs an illegal casino out of his dorm room called the Benetian. Parker suspects him of being the rapist due to him wearing the same cologne she smelled the night she was raped, and Veronica investigates and finds he owns an electric razor. She reports this to Lamb, who agrees with her for once, due to seeing the same date rape drugs inside Mercer's money box. However, Logan provides Mercer with an incriminating alibi – they accidentally burnt down a Tijuana motel the night of one of the rapes – but Veronica finds other proof that he didn't do it (his live, call-in radio show being on at the time of one of the rapes). However, when at the Pi Sig party, she hears his show being played and recognizes electronic distortion and skipping, she realizes he is the rapist, the shows being recorded. She prevents him from raping a 5th girl and stabs him with a ceramic unicorn horn, and eventually, Keith arrests Moe and Mercer. He is last seen in a jail cell with Logan (who smashed a police cruiser to get arrested, get put into a cell with Mercer, and get revenge on him for what he did to Veronica and the other girls). Devlin reprises his role in the fourth season episode "Heads You Lose", where Veronica visits him in prison.

==== Hank Landry ====
Patrick Fabian portrays Hank Landry, Veronica's Criminology professor and admirer. He is having an affair with Dean O'Dell's wife Mindy O'Dell and accidentally kills her when framed by his TA Tim Foyle for the murder of the Dean. Hank Landry is Veronica's Intro to Criminology professor. Although Veronica has yet to decide on a major, Prof. Landry has been advocating criminal investigations as a career choice for her. Prof. Landry is joined in his Intro to Criminology class by his teaching assistant Tim Foyle. Veronica first impressed Prof. Landry by solving the murder mystery he presented on the first day of class in record time. Later, she impresses him by being the sole person to write an "A" caliber paper on his "Perfect Murder" assignment. After reading the paper, he talks to Veronica about her potential and offers her faculty adviser. While Veronica is considering Prof. Landry's offer, she is manipulated by Tim Foyle into finding out one of Landry's secrets: he has been having an affair with Mindy O'Dell, the wife of the Dean of Hearst College. Shortly after this incident, Prof Landry announces his end-of-term research paper: to plan the perfect murder. He then meets with Veronica and tells her that he will recommend her for a summer internship with the FBI and that he will accept her application essay for the position as a replacement for the end-of-term assignment. Veronica assumed that Prof. Landry was attempting to buy her silence about Landry's affair with Mindy and turned down the offer. Upon telling this to Prof. Landry, he explained that the internship offer had nothing to do with what she knew about him, but Veronica still opted to write the end-of-term paper. Veronica received one of the three "A"s that Prof. Landry gave out for this paper. When Veronica finds out that her father is investigating whether Dean O'Dell's wife is having an affair, she tells Keith what she knows about Prof. Landry and Mindy. Keith tells the Dean, who takes a loaded revolver and visits Prof. Landry and Mindy O'Dell in the middle of one of their rendezvous. It is as of now unknown what transpired in the room that night. When Keith takes the Dean O'Dell case, he finds Prof. Landry at a local bar and attempts to entice Landry's confession over some drinks. However, this does not work as Landry informs Keith that he read Keith's book and he knows that Keith is a private investigator.

==== Claire Nordhouse ====
Krista Kalmus plays Claire Nordhouse, a feminist and member of Lillith house, friends with Nish and Fern. She is one of the protestors who made a front-page newspaper picture of many topless women holding a banner reading, "We go to Hearst, go ahead and rape us!" Claire is beautiful, with long blonde hair, making her the target of the rival newspaper's response (topless men holding a banner saying "No thanks! (except maybe the blonde in the middle)"). The three use this response to have the Pi Sig house shut down and the rival newspaper run by them by faking Claire's rape. However, Veronica finds out that it was not real and exposes this – ATM photos showing the guy with her before her rape, who took her home, was Claire's boyfriend who helped set it up. She is then expelled from Hearst as a result. She was Patrice Pitrelli's best friend in their freshman year and was the source of information about the Theta Beta two-way mirror.

==== Cyrus O'Dell ====
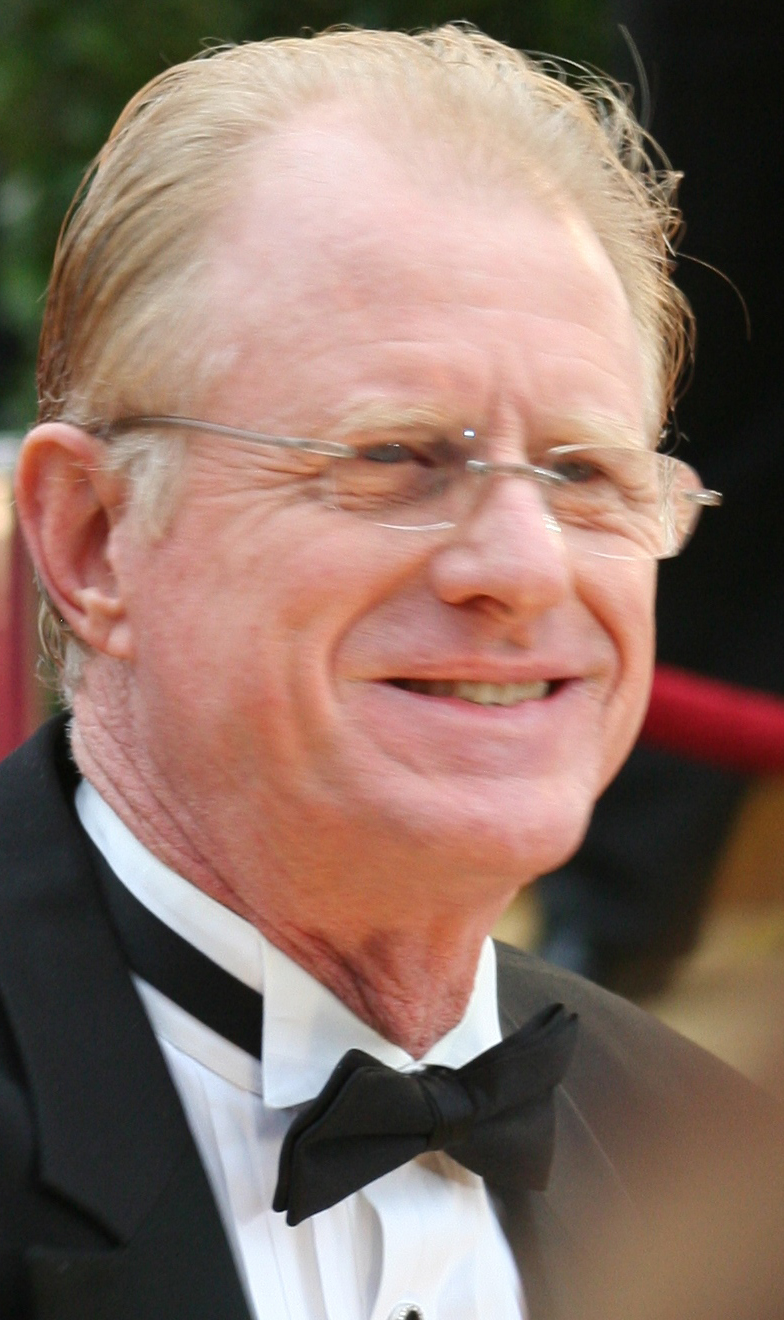
Ed Begley, Jr. played Cyrus O'Dell.

Ed Begley, Jr. portrays Cyrus O'Dell, the Dean of Hearst College. Initially, Veronica's adversary, gradually becoming her ally and gaining her respect, and vice versa. Married to much younger Mindy, he suspects her of having an affair, which Keith later proves to be with Hank Landry. He confronts the two, threatening to leave her broke and ruin Landry's career. Tim Foyle kills him during the ninth episode in Veronica's Plan a Perfect Murder paper (a fake suicide). After his death, it is revealed that he wrote her a referral to the FBI, a statement of what a brilliant student she was and how he had not encountered a student with more talent in all his years in academia. His body is found by Weevil, who is rather gutted, having grown quite fond of the dean while working at Hearst.

==== Bronson Pope ====
Michael Mitchell plays Bronson Pope, an animal rights activist and Mac's first post-Cassidy boyfriend. He is shown to be extremely outdoorsy, encouraging Mac to play Ultimate Frisbee and take early morning hikes. She loses her virginity on Valentine's Day but breaks up with him not much later after falling for Max.

==== Moe Slater ====
Andrew McClain portrays Moe Slater, the R.A. of the Hearst College dorms. He is very earnest and is always offering oolong tea to everyone – implied to be how he drugs people. Mercer's partner helped him rape the girls as he was the Safe Ride Home driver. He would take drunk girls home (it is still unclear whether he drugged them at the party or drugged them once they were in their dorms) and then tell Mercer which room and provide him the keys to get in. The relationship between him and Mercer is implied to result from the prison warden experiment that Logan and Wallace underwent. He keeps a photo of the two of them in their uniforms. Moe was the prisoner, and Mercer, the warden, mentally dominated him and controlled him to rape. It was Moe that drugged Veronica and tried to shave her head to give Mercer an alibi.

==== Nish Sweeney ====
Chastity Dotson portrays Nancy "Nish" Sweeney, the former Editor of the Hearst Free Press and feminist of Lillith House. She and Veronica are initially friends when she gives Veronica the assignment to go undercover and infiltrate the Theta Beta sorority house. Veronica is supposed to find proof of a two-way mirror in which Theta Betas would make the rushes undress in front of for the Pi Sigs enjoyment. However, Nish publishes the article that Veronica asked her not to write about a cannabis farm at the sorority house, and they become enemies. Nish helps Claire fake the rape and eggs Dean O'Dell's window the night he was murdered. By the end of the semester, Nish and Veronica are on good terms, as Veronica gives her a list of names of members of the secret fraternity, the Castle.

==== Blake Long ====
Spencer Ward plays Blake Long, a Pi Sig member in the fourth season, involved in a mysterious cover-up that may be connected to the Neptune Spring Break bombings.

== Other characters ==
The following is a supplementary list of recurring or one-time guest stars, which includes characters that appear briefly in multiple episodes but have little to no real-world content to justify an entire section covering their in-universe histories.

Steve Rankin portrays Lloyd Blankenship, a newspaper reporter and ally of Keith.

Taylor Sheridan plays Danny Boyd, Liam Fitzpatrick's dim-witted cousin and accomplice.

Kate McNeil plays Betina Casablancas, Dick and Cassidy's biological mother.

Brandon Hillock plays Jerry Sacks, Sheriff Lamb's right-hand man.

Annie Campbell plays Molly Fitzpatrick, a member of the Fitzpatrick family and Felix's girlfriend until his death.

Kevin Sheridan plays Sean Friedrich, an "09er" with a penchant for thievery and drug dealing.

Cher Ferreyra portrays Fern Delgado, a disgruntled feminist and member of the "Take Back the Night" program. She lives in Lillith house with Nish and Claire and dislikes Veronica for proving the Pi Sigs weren't rapists. Veronica initially suspects her in the disappearance of Selma Hearst Rose.

Robert Ri'Chard plays Mason, a hot-tempered basketball jock and Wallace's new friend. He encourages Wallace to skip studying to hang out with him and instead puts him in contact with Max to cheat. He is the one who mistakes Josh as being the person out on the overlook with Coach Barry before he is killed.

Joss Whedon plays Douglas, a clueless car-rental salesman who inadvertently helps Veronica track down Abel Koontz' daughter Amelia Delongpre in the episode "Rat Saw God".

Logan Miller and Ashton Moio play Simon and Craig, two college students and Spring Breakers whose friendship with a bombing victim is a source of clues for Mars Investigations.
