= List of Veronica Mars episodes =

Veronica Mars is an American television series created by Rob Thomas. The series ran for four seasons; it premiered on September 22, 2004, during UPN's last two years, and ended on May 22, 2007, after a season on UPN's successor, The CW. The series balances murder mystery, high school and college drama, featuring social commentary with sarcasm and off-beat humor in a style often compared to film noir. Set in the fictional town of Neptune, Veronica Mars starred Kristen Bell as the title character, a student who progressed from high school to college during the series while moonlighting as a private investigator under the wing of her detective father. Episodes have a distinct structure: Veronica solves a different "case of the week" while continually trying to solve a season-long mystery. The first two seasons of the series have a season-long mystery arc, in which the conflict is introduced in the first episode of the season and resolved in the finale. The third season takes on a different format, focusing on smaller mystery arcs that last the course of several episodes.

The first season's run of 22 episodes garnered an average of 2.5 million viewers per episode in the United States. The second season decreased to an average of 2.3 million viewers; however, it included the series' highest rated episode with 3.6 million viewers. The third and final season saw an increase to an average of 2.5 million viewers. Veronica Mars appeared on a number of fall television best lists, and garnered a number of awards and nominations. At the 2007 CW Upfront, Ostroff announced that Veronica Mars was not part of the new primetime lineup, and in June 2007, TV Guide writer Michael Ausiello confirmed that the cancellation of Veronica Mars was official. In September 2018, an eight-episode fourth season was confirmed by Hulu, which was released on July 19, 2019.

== Series overview ==
Season	Episodes	Originally released		
Season	Episodes	First released	Last released	Network
1	22	September 22, 2004	May 10, 2005	UPN
2	22	September 28, 2005	May 9, 2006	UPN
3	20	October 3, 2006	May 22, 2007	The CW
Film		March 14, 2014		—N/a
4	8	July 19, 2019		Hulu

== Episodes ==
=== Season 1 (2004–05) ===
The first season revolves around Veronica Mars (Kristen Bell), a high school student and private investigator in the fictional coastal Southern California town of Neptune. As the daughter of well-respected County Sheriff Keith Mars (Enrico Colantoni), the biggest problem in Veronica's life was getting dumped by her boyfriend, Duncan Kane (Teddy Dunn). But when her best friend Lilly Kane (Amanda Seyfried) is murdered, Veronica's life falls apart. Veronica's father accuses Lilly's father, popular software billionaire Jake Kane (Kyle Secor), of being involved in the murder. This provokes Neptune's wrath, and Keith is ousted and replaced by the new sheriff Don Lamb (Michael Muhney) in a recall election. Veronica's mother, Lianne Mars (Corinne Bohrer), develops a drinking problem and leaves town. When Veronica's "09er" friends—wealthy students from the fictional 90909 ZIP Code—force her to choose between them and her father, Veronica decides to work part-time in her father's newly opened private investigation agency, Mars Investigations. She helps her father solve cases and conducts her own investigations on behalf of friends and acquaintances at school.

Veronica discovers new evidence which suggests that Abel Koontz (Christian Clemenson), the man imprisoned after confessing to Lilly's murder, is innocent. As Veronica delves deeper into the murder case, she also works on other investigations, seeks her mother's whereabouts and deals with the aftermath of being drugged and raped during an "09er" party. Veronica, no longer part of the school's wealthy in-crowd, makes some new friends: Wallace Fennel (Percy Daggs III), Neptune High basketball star; Eli "Weevil" Navarro (Francis Capra), leader of the PCHers, a Latino biker gang named after the Pacific Coast Highway; and Cindy "Mac" Mackenzie (Tina Majorino), Neptune High's resident computer genius. Using her friends' resources, as well as those provided by her father and his contacts, Veronica gains a reputation for sleuthing and finds her skills in increasingly high demand at her school. Things get more complicated when Veronica falls into a relationship with Lilly's ex-boyfriend Logan Echolls (Jason Dohring), who for a time held Veronica partly responsible for Lilly's death and went out of his way to harass her.

No. overall	No. in season	Title	Directed by	Written by	Original release date	Prod. code	U.S. viewers (millions)
1	1	"Pilot"	Mark Piznarski	Rob Thomas	September 22, 2004	475258	2.49
2	2	"Credit Where Credit's Due"	Mark Piznarski	Rob Thomas	September 28, 2004	2T5701	2.21
3	3	"Meet John Smith"	Harry Winer	Jed Seidel	October 12, 2004	2T5702	2.71
4	4	"The Wrath of Con"	Michael Fields	Diane Ruggiero	October 19, 2004	2T5703	3.12
5	5	"You Think You Know Somebody"	Nick Gomez	Dayna Lynne North	October 26, 2004	2T5704	2.73
6	6	"Return of the Kane"	Sarah Pia Anderson	Story by : Rob Thomas; Teleplay by : Phil Klemmer	November 2, 2004	2T5705	2.86
7	7	"The Girl Next Door"	Nick Marck	Story by : Jed Seidel; Teleplay by : Jed Seidel & Diane Ruggiero	November 9, 2004	2T5706	2.74
8	8	"Like a Virgin"	Guy Bee	Aury Wallington	November 23, 2004	2T5707	2.76
9	9	"Drinking the Kool-Aid"	Marcos Siega	Story by : Rob Thomas; Teleplay by : Russell Smith	November 30, 2004	2T5708	2.40
10	10	"An Echolls Family Christmas"	Nick Marck	Diane Ruggiero	December 14, 2004	2T5710	1.90
11	11	"Silence of the Lamb"	John Kretchmer	Jed Seidel & Dayna Lynne North	January 4, 2005	2T5709	2.84
12	12	"Clash of the Tritons"	David Barrett	Phil Klemmer & Aury Wallington	January 11, 2005	2T5711	2.91
13	13	"Lord of the Bling"	Steve Gomer	John Enbom	February 8, 2005	2T5712	2.97
14	14	"Mars vs. Mars"	Marcos Siega	Story by : Rob Thomas; Teleplay by : Jed Seidel & Diane Ruggiero	February 15, 2005	2T5713	2.70
15	15	"Ruskie Business"	Guy Bee	Phil Klemmer & John Enbom	February 22, 2005	2T5714	2.34
16	16	"Betty and Veronica"	Michael Fields	Diane Ruggiero	March 29, 2005	2T5715	2.33
17	17	"Kanes and Abel's"	Nick Marck	Carolyn Murray	April 5, 2005	2T5716	2.78
18	18	"Weapons of Class Destruction"	John Kretchmer	Jed Seidel	April 12, 2005	2T5717	2.30
19	19	"Hot Dogs"	Nick Marck	Dayna Lynne North	April 19, 2005	2T5718	2.48
20	20	"M.A.D."	John Kretchmer	Phil Klemmer & John Enbom	April 26, 2005	2T5719	3.04
21	21	"A Trip to the Dentist"	Marcos Siega	Diane Ruggiero	May 3, 2005	2T5720	2.85
22	22	"Leave It to Beaver"	Michael Fields	Story by : Rob Thomas; Teleplay by : Rob Thomas & Diane Ruggiero	May 10, 2005	2T5721	2.99

=== Season 2 (2005–06) ===
The second season adds three regular cast members: new character Jackie Cook (Tessa Thompson), and first season recurring characters Dick Casablancas (Ryan Hansen) and Cassidy "Beaver" Casablancas (Kyle Gallner). The season begins with the introduction of two new cases: When a school bus full of Neptune High students plunges off a cliff, killing almost everyone on board, Veronica makes it her mission to discover why the bus crashed. Meanwhile, Logan is accused of killing PCH biker gang member Felix Toombs after drunkenly picking a fight with Weevil and the PCHers. Partway through the season, Weevil becomes convinced of Logan's innocence and they team up to find the real killer. Veronica's life returns to much the way it was before Lilly's death: having broken up with Logan during the summer, she reunites with Duncan and is somewhat accepted by the "09ers". However, her private-eye sideline and tough persona keep her from being truly assimilated back into the rich crowd. "09ers" Dick and Cassidy deal with a gold-digging stepmother, Kendall Casablancas (Charisma Carpenter), with whom they are left when their father flees the country while under investigation for real estate fraud. Wallace discovers that his biological father is alive and takes a romantic interest in Jackie.

The mystery involving Logan and Weevil was the producers' attempt to give Bell some time off after the taxing first season. Thomas later considered the mystery arcs of the second season to have had "way too many suspects, way too many red herrings", necessitating a change for the third season. As Thomas had conceived the show as a one-year mystery, he decided to introduce and eliminate several characters in order to create an "equally fascinating mystery" for the series' second season. Thomas needed "new blood" since he felt unable to bring back the Kanes and the Echolls and "have them all involved in a new mystery". Teddy Dunn, who portrayed Duncan Kane, left the series midway through the season because Thomas felt that the Logan-Veronica-Duncan love triangle had run its course. He needed to put "other guys in her life" to keep the series fresh and attributed Dunn's removal to fan interest dominating the Logan-Veronica relationship, saying "it became clear that one suitor won out".

No. overall	No. in season	Title	Directed by	Written by	Original release date	Prod. code	U.S. viewers (millions)
23	1	"Normal Is the Watchword"	John Kretchmer	Rob Thomas	September 28, 2005	2T7201	3.29
24	2	"Driver Ed"	Nick Marck	Diane Ruggiero	October 5, 2005	2T7202	2.73
25	3	"Cheatty Cheatty Bang Bang"	John Kretchmer	Phil Klemmer & John Enbom	October 12, 2005	2T7203	3.03
26	4	"Green-Eyed Monster"	Jason Bloom	Dayna Lynne North	October 19, 2005	2T7204	3.05
27	5	"Blast from the Past"	Harry Winer	Phil Klemmer & Cathy Belben	October 26, 2005	2T7205	3.58
28	6	"Rat Saw God"	Kevin Bray	John Enbom & Phil Klemmer	November 9, 2005	2T7206	3.07
29	7	"Nobody Puts Baby in a Corner"	Nick Marck	Diane Ruggiero	November 16, 2005	2T7207	2.94
30	8	"Ahoy, Mateys!"	Steve Gomer	John Enbom & Cathy Belben	November 23, 2005	2T7208	2.50
31	9	"My Mother, the Fiend"	Nick Marck	Phil Klemmer & Dayna Lynne North	November 30, 2005	2T7209	2.82
32	10	"One Angry Veronica"	John Kretchmer	Russell Smith	December 7, 2005	2T7210	3.42
33	11	"Donut Run"	Rob Thomas	Rob Thomas	January 25, 2006	2T7211	1.62
34	12	"Rashard and Wallace Go to White Castle"	John Kretchmer	John Enbom	February 1, 2006	2T7212	2.12
35	13	"Ain't No Magic Mountain High Enough"	Guy Bee	Diane Ruggiero	February 8, 2006	2T7213	2.05
36	14	"Versatile Toppings"	Sarah Pia Anderson	Phil Klemmer	March 15, 2006	2T7214	2.73
37	15	"The Quick and the Wed"	Rick Rosenthal	John Serge	March 22, 2006	2T7215	2.34
38	16	"The Rapes of Graff"	Michael Fields	John Enbom	March 29, 2006	2T7216	2.15
39	17	"Plan B"	John Kretchmer	Dayna Lynne North	April 5, 2006	2T7217	2.85
40	18	"I Am God"	Martha Mitchell	Diane Ruggiero & Cathy Belben	April 11, 2006	2T7218	1.76
41	19	"Nevermind the Buttocks"	Jason Bloom	Phil Klemmer	April 18, 2006	2T7219	1.91
42	20	"Look Who's Stalking"	Michael Fields	John Enbom	April 25, 2006	2T7220	1.85
43	21	"Happy Go Lucky"	Steve Gomer	Diane Ruggiero	May 2, 2006	2T7221	2.09
44	22	"Not Pictured"	John Kretchmer	Story by : Rob Thomas; Teleplay by : Rob Thomas & John Enbom	May 9, 2006	2T7222	2.42

=== Season 3 (2006–07) ===
The third season introduces two new series regulars, Parker Lee (Julie Gonzalo) and Stosh "Piz" Piznarski (Chris Lowell). Piz was created so that Veronica could have a male friend of middle-class status rather than of upper-class, and his campus radio show serves as a narrative device to capture the mood of the university. Don Lamb and Mac, recurring characters in the first two seasons, are upgraded to series regulars. The season begins with Veronica, Logan, Wallace, Mac and Dick as freshmen at Hearst College. Piz and Parker are introduced as the respective roommates of Wallace and Mac. The first mystery is established when Parker becomes the latest victim of the Hearst serial rapist, a storyline begun in a second season episode. Veronica sets out to catch the rapist, partially motivated by guilt from failing to help Parker. The next mystery, a murder, commences in the same episode the rapist is discovered. During the season, Keith begins an affair with a married client, Wallace struggles to balance academics and sports, Mac begins dating again after previous failed relationships, and Dick has a breakdown and appeals to Logan for help. The season also chronicles Veronica and Logan's failing attempts to maintain their relationship in the face of Veronica's mistrust. The couple breaks up several times throughout the season, and Logan begins dating Parker while Veronica goes out with Piz. Keith is challenged in the sheriff's election by longtime rival P.I. Vinnie Van Lowe (Ken Marino), and faces charges after he destroys evidence incriminating Veronica.

The third season was initially planned to include three separate mysteries that would be introduced and resolved in a series of non-overlapping story arcs. Dawn Ostroff pointed out that the original format may confuse viewers, and the new format would allow new viewers to start watching at any point in the season. Inspired by the improvised thriller Bubble, Thomas started laying "subtle" motives for the second mystery during the first one, so that fans would have "a theory on whodunit" when it occurred. The first mystery took place over the first nine episodes. Originally, the second mystery was to be seven episodes long and the third mystery was to occur over the last six episodes of the season. When The CW ordered a 20-episode season instead of the usual 22 episodes, the second mystery arc was shortened from seven episodes to six, and the third mystery was changed from a six episode arc to a five-episode arc. After an eight-week hiatus for the series was announced, the final mystery was changed to five stand-alone episodes designed to be friendlier to new viewers. For the third mystery, Thomas had wanted to present a new situation where Wallace and Mac could be fully involved, "key players [with] really interesting stuff to do". This was a departure from previous seasons where "nice characters" had always been absent from the big mystery because no one was going to believe them to be a suspect.

No. overall	No. in season	Title	Directed by	Written by	Original release date	Prod. code	U.S. viewers (millions)
45	1	"Welcome Wagon"	John Kretchmer	Rob Thomas	October 3, 2006	3T5801	3.36
46	2	"My Big Fat Greek Rush Week"	John Kretchmer	Diane Ruggiero	October 10, 2006	3T5802	2.96
47	3	"Wichita Linebacker"	Harry Winer	Phil Klemmer & John Enbom	October 17, 2006	3T5803	3.12
48	4	"Charlie Don't Surf"	Jason Bloom	Diane Ruggiero & Jason Elen	October 24, 2006	3T5804	3.33
49	5	"President Evil"	Nick Marck	Jonathan Moskin & David Mulei	October 31, 2006	3T5805	2.70
50	6	"Hi, Infidelity"	Michael Fields	John Enbom	November 7, 2006	3T5806	2.75
51	7	"Of Vice and Men"	Harry Winer	Phil Klemmer	November 14, 2006	3T5807	2.69
52	8	"Lord of the Pi's"	Steve Gomer	Diane Ruggiero	November 21, 2006	3T5808	2.57
53	9	"Spit & Eggs"	Rob Thomas	Rob Thomas	November 28, 2006	3T5809	3.44
54	10	"Show Me the Monkey"	Nick Marck	Story by : John Enbom; Teleplay by : John Enbom & Robert Hull	January 23, 2007	3T5810	3.23
55	11	"Poughkeepsie, Tramps and Thieves"	John Kretchmer	Diane Ruggiero	January 30, 2007	3T5811	2.69
56	12	"There's Got to Be a Morning After Pill"	Tricia Brock	Story by : Jonathan Moskin & David Mulei; Teleplay by : Jonathan Moskin & Phil Klemmer & John Enbom	February 6, 2007	3T5812	2.40
57	13	"Postgame Mortem"	John Kretchmer	Joe Voci	February 13, 2007	3T5813	2.37
58	14	"Mars, Bars"	Harry Winer	Story by : Phil Klemmer & John Enbom & Joe Voci; Teleplay by : Phil Klemmer & John Enbom	February 20, 2007	3T5814	2.27
59	15	"Papa's Cabin"	Michael Fields	John Enbom	February 27, 2007	3T5815	2.66
60	16	"Un-American Graffiti"	John Kretchmer	Robert Hull	May 1, 2007	3T5816	2.35
61	17	"Debasement Tapes"	Dan Etheridge	John Enbom	May 8, 2007	3T5817	1.85
62	18	"I Know What You'll Do Next Summer"	Nick Marck	Jonathan Moskin & David Mulei	May 15, 2007	3T5818	2.10
63	19	"Weevils Wobble But They Don't Go Down"	Jason Bloom	Phil Klemmer	May 22, 2007	3T5819	1.78
64	20	"The Bitch Is Back"	Michael Fields	Rob Thomas & Diane Ruggiero	May 22, 2007	3T5820	2.15

=== Film (2014) ===
Title	Directed by	Written by	Release date (U.S.)
Veronica Mars	Rob Thomas	Story by : Rob Thomas; Screenplay by : Rob Thomas & Diane Ruggiero	March 8, 2014 (SXSW); March 14, 2014 (VOD)
Nine years after the events of the show's third season, former teenage sleuth Veronica Mars has left the fictional town of Neptune, California, and moved to New York City, where she is in a relationship with Stosh "Piz" Piznarski and has a job offer from the prestigious law firm Truman-Mann and Associates. She is contacted by her ex-boyfriend Logan Echolls, now a Lieutenant in the United States Navy, who has been accused of murdering his girlfriend Carrie Bishop, a fellow Neptune High student who became a self-destructive pop star under the stage name "Bonnie DeVille". He is being bombarded for offers of representation from lawyers, and Veronica agrees to return to Neptune and help Logan find one who will best represent him. She reunites with her father Keith Mars, Neptune's former sheriff-turned-private investigator, who shows her how corruption and classism are rife under Sheriff Dan Lamb.

=== Season 4 (2019) ===
No. overall	No. in season	Title	Directed by	Written by	Original release date	Prod. code
65	1	"Spring Break Forever"	Michael Lehmann	Rob Thomas	July 19, 2019	T13.21601
66	2	"Chino and the Man"	Michael Fields	Diane Ruggiero-Wright	July 19, 2019	T13.21602
67	3	"Keep Calm and Party On"	Joaquin Sedillo	Heather V. Regnier	July 19, 2019	T13.21603
68	4	"Heads You Lose"	Rachel Goldberg	David Walpert	July 19, 2019	T13.21604
69	5	"Losing Streak"	Scott Winant	David Walpert	July 19, 2019	T13.21605
70	6	"Entering a World of Pain"	Tessa Blake	Kareem Abdul-Jabbar & Raymond Obstfeld	July 19, 2019	T13.21606
71	7	"Gods of War"	Amanda Marsalis	Diane Ruggiero-Wright & Heather V. Renier	July 19, 2019	T13.21607
72	8	"Years, Continents, Bloodshed"	Scott Winant	Rob Thomas	July 19, 2019	T13.21608

== Ratings ==
Veronica Mars : U.S. viewers per episode (millions)

Season	Episode number																						Average
Season	1	2	3	4	5	6	7	8	9	10	11	12	13	14	15	16	17	18	19	20	21	22	Average
1	2.49	2.21	2.71	3.12	2.73	2.86	2.74	2.76	2.40	1.90	2.84	2.91	2.97	2.70	2.34	2.33	2.78	2.30	2.48	3.04	2.85	2.99	2.66
2	3.29	2.73	3.03	3.05	3.58	3.07	2.94	2.50	2.82	3.42	1.62	2.12	2.05	2.73	2.34	2.15	2.85	1.76	1.91	1.85	2.09	2.42	2.56
3	3.36	2.96	3.12	3.33	2.70	2.75	2.69	2.57	3.44	3.23	2.69	2.40	2.37	2.27	2.66	2.35	1.85	2.10	1.78	2.15	–		2.64

Audience measurement performed by Nielsen Media Research
