= Veronica Mars season 2 =

Veronica Mars
- Season 2
- DVD cover
- Starring: Kristen Bell; Percy Daggs III; Teddy Dunn; Jason Dohring; Francis Capra; Ryan Hansen; Kyle Gallner; Tessa Thompson; Enrico Colantoni
- No. of episodes: 22

Release
- Original network: UPN
- Original release: September 28, 2005 – May 9, 2006

Season chronology
- ← Previous; Season 1 Next → Season 3

The second season of Veronica Mars, an American drama television series created by Rob Thomas, premiered on UPN in the United States on September 28, 2005. The series was produced by Warner Bros. Television, Silver Pictures Television and Rob Thomas Productions, and Joel Silver and Thomas served as the executive producers.

The season begins with the introduction of two new cases: when a school bus full of Neptune High students plunges off a cliff, killing almost everyone on board, Veronica Mars (Kristen Bell) makes it her mission to discover why the bus crashed. Logan Echolls (Jason Dohring) is accused of killing a Pacific Coast Highway (PCH) biker gang member after a drunken fight with Eli "Weevil" Navarro (Francis Capra) and the PCHers.

The series was critically acclaimed, and appeared on several fall television best lists. The second season garnered an average of 2.3 million viewers per all 22 episodes in the US. Out of all regular primetime programming that aired during the 2005–2006 American television season, Veronica Mars ranked 145th out of 156, according to the Nielsen ratings system. The premiere was watched by 3.30 million viewers, while the finale was watched by 2.42 million viewers.

== Cast and crew ==
The main characters of the second season include (from left to right): Dick Casablancas, Cassidy "Beaver" Casablancas, Jackie Cook, Veronica Mars, Keith Mars, Wallace Fennel, Logan Echolls, and Eli "Weevil" Navarro. (Not pictured is Teddy Dunn as Duncan Kane, who left midseason).

The second season was produced by Warner Bros. Television, Silver Pictures Television and Rob Thomas Productions. Joel Silver and Thomas served as the executive producers, and Jennifer Gwartz, Danielle Stokdyk and Diane Ruggiero served as co-executive producers. The season's crew also included producers Howard Grisby and Dan Etheridge, co-producer Stacy Fields, head writer Dayna Lynne North, and casting director Deedee Bradley.

The second season features a cast of nine actors who receive star billing, six of whom were regulars in the first season. Kristen Bell portrays the titular Veronica Mars, a high school senior and skilled private detective. Teddy Dunn plays Duncan Kane, Veronica's ex-boyfriend and Lilly's brother. Jason Dohring plays Logan Echolls, the "bad-boy" son of an A-list actor and an "09er", a group of wealthy students from the fictional 90909 ZIP code. Percy Daggs III portrays Wallace Fennel, Veronica's best friend and frequent partner in solving mysteries. Francis Capra portrays Eli "Weevil" Navarro, the leader of the PCH Biker gang and Veronica's friend. Enrico Colantoni plays Veronica's father Keith Mars, a private investigator and former Balboa County Sheriff.

Thomas, who said that he "conceive[d] the show as a one-year mystery", decided that he needed to introduce and eliminate several characters to be able to create an "equally fascinating mystery" for the series' second season. Thomas felt that he could not bring back the Kanes and the Echolls and "have them all involved in a new mystery"; he needed "new blood". The second season saw the introduction of Tessa Thompson as Jackie Cook, a romantic interest of Wallace and daughter of a famous baseball player. Previous recurring characters Dick Casablancas and Cassidy "Beaver" Casablancas were upgraded to series regulars. Dick, played by Ryan Hansen, was an 09er friend of Logan, a womanizer and former high-school bully turned frat boy. Kyle Gallner portrayed "Beaver", Dick's introverted younger brother. Dunn, who played Duncan Kane, left the series midway through the season. Thomas explained that the Logan–Veronica–Duncan love triangle had run its course, and to keep the series fresh, there would need to be "other guys in her life". He attributed Dunn's removal to fan interest dominating the Logan–Veronica relationship, saying "it became clear that one suitor won out".

== Episodes ==
The season begins with Veronica's life returning to the way it was before Lilly's death: having broken up with Logan during the summer, she reunites with Duncan and is somewhat accepted by the 09ers. However, her tough personality and work as a private investigator keep her from being truly assimilated back into the rich crowd. 09ers Dick and Cassidy are abandoned by their father, who flees the country while under investigation for real estate fraud. The brothers are forced to deal with their stepmother, Kendall Casablancas (Charisma Carpenter), who is only interested in their father's money. Wallace discovers that his biological father is alive and takes a romantic interest in Jackie.

No. overall	No. in season	Title	Directed by	Written by	Original release date	Prod. code	U.S. viewers (millions)
23	1	"Normal Is the Watchword"	John Kretchmer	Rob Thomas	September 28, 2005	2T7201	3.29
After breaking up with Logan during the summer and resuming dating Duncan, Veronica tries to rebuild a normal life. When several athletes—including Wallace and Meg—fail their drug tests, Veronica uncovers who faked the results. Logan is accused of murdering PCH biker gang member Felix Toombs, however the charges are dropped because of a lack of evidence. While on a school tour of the home ground of the professional baseball team Neptune Sharks, Veronica meets Woody Goodman, the team's owner. Veronica is thrust into a larger mystery when the school bus that she had just missed mysteriously plunges off a cliff into the Pacific Ocean.
24	2	"Driver Ed"	Nick Marck	Diane Ruggiero	October 5, 2005	2T7202	2.73
Veronica discovers that Meg is the only survivor from the bus crash, but is in a coma. When the bus driver is blamed for the crash, his daughter Jessie asks Veronica to clear his name. Wallace meets the new rich girl Jackie Cook, and tries to impress her. Woody is running for the position of Balboa County Supervisor, more commonly known as the "Mayor of Neptune". He asks Keith to run for Sheriff, and Keith accepts after seeing Sheriff Lamb's investigation of the bus crash case. Kevin Smith guest stars as Duane Anders.
25	3	"Cheatty Cheatty Bang Bang"	John Kretchmer	Phil Klemmer & John Enbom	October 12, 2005	2T7203	3.03
Cassidy hires Veronica to prove that his stepmother, Kendall, is cheating on his father Richard. During the investigation, Veronica discovers that Richard is stealing money entrusted to his real estate company. She decides to go expose Richard's crime, which forces him to flee the country before the SEC can arrest him. Keith and Alicia, Wallace's mother, spend the weekend in Chicago, where Alicia runs into a man from her past.
26	4	"Green-Eyed Monster"	Jason Bloom	Dayna Lynne North	October 19, 2005	2T7204	3.05
Veronica investigates a woman's fiancé, but finds that the only secret he has been concealing is that he is independently wealthy. Meg's sister asks Duncan to help retrieve information from Meg's laptop before her parents find it. The man who Alicia met in Chicago comes to Neptune, and Keith finds out that he is Alicia's former husband and Wallace's father.
27	5	"Blast from the Past"	Harry Winer	Phil Klemmer & Cathy Belben	October 26, 2005	2T7205	3.58
Wallace confronts his mother about his father, Nathan Woods. Wallace confides in Veronica, but she is preoccupied with the crash and helping Jackie find out who stole her credit card. Wallace decides to leave with his father for Chicago. Veronica learns that Terrence Cook, Jackie's father, has a large gambling debt. Terrence tells Veronica that he is being blackmailed by Sheriff Lamb, who has threatened to reveal Terrence's address to the men he owes money to. Veronica later finds a voice mail message left by a student on the bus, which suggests that an explosion immediately preceded the crash. When she plays the message for Keith, he gives it to Sheriff Lamb rather than revealing it to the public.
28	6	"Rat Saw God"	Kevin Bray	John Enbom & Phil Klemmer	November 9, 2005	2T7206	3.07
Keith loses the election for Sheriff to Lamb, and Logan is re-arrested for Felix's murder after the anonymous 911 caller comes forward and says he will testify against Logan. Abel Koontz reappears and asks Veronica to track down his daughter Amelia so he can see her before he dies. Keith breaks into the area where the bus is kept and finds a rat taped under one of the seats. Joss Whedon guest stars as a rental car supervisor.
29	7	"Nobody Puts Baby in a Corner"	Nick Marck	Diane Ruggiero	November 16, 2005	2T7207	2.94
When Duncan learns from Meg's emails that she had been babysitting an abused child, Veronica takes on a series of babysitting jobs to help Duncan try to find the victim. Logan asks Veronica to prove that the witness to Felix's murder, Dr. Tom Griffith, is lying and that he was not on the bridge the night of the killing. Woody wins the election and is named the Balboa County Supervisor. He tells Keith of his plan to incorporate the wealthy part of Neptune, which would widen the gap between the rich and the poor. Woody promises Keith that if his plan for incorporation passes, he will make Keith the Chief of Police.
30	8	"Ahoy, Mateys!"	Steve Gomer	John Enbom & Cathy Belben	November 23, 2005	2T7208	2.50
Veronica and Keith try to uncover who is tormenting the Oliveres family, whose son Marcos died in the crash. Veronica learns that the witness who saw Logan on the bridge, Dr. Griffith, has ties to the "Fighting Fitzpatricks", a Neptune crime family. Thumper, one of the PCHers, tells Weevil that the last people on the bridge with Felix were Hector and Bootsy.
31	9	"My Mother, the Fiend"	Nick Marck	Phil Klemmer & Dayna Lynne North	November 30, 2005	2T7209	2.82
After reading her mother's high school permanent record, Veronica investigates her mother's suspension for spreading "malicious lies" and a possible relation to Neptune High's deaf cafeteria lady. Weevil tells Logan that he no longer believes that Logan killed Felix, and they agree to work together in secret while publicly continuing their feud. Cassidy uses his trust fund money to start a real estate holding company, Phoenix Land Trust, with Kendall as the figurehead CEO. Veronica surreptitiously visits Meg in the hospital and discovers her still comatose and visibly pregnant.
32	10	"One Angry Veronica"	John Kretchmer	Russell Smith	December 7, 2005	2T7210	3.42
Veronica is selected to be a juror for a case between two 09er boys and a poor Hispanic woman, and Keith investigates the disappearance of sex tapes from the evidence locker in the police station. Meg awakes from her coma and tells Veronica that she does not want her parents to receive custody of her baby. She apologizes to Veronica for her attitude towards her after Duncan dumped her, and although she dies shortly afterwards, her baby survives. Wallace returns from Chicago.
33	11	"Donut Run"	Rob Thomas	Rob Thomas	January 25, 2006	2T7211	1.62
Veronica helps Duncan, who kidnapped his daughter, escape the country under the noses of Sheriff Lamb and the FBI. Logan and Weevil, working together in secret to avoid the wrath of the PCHers, try to figure out which PCHer is working with the Fitzpatricks. Wallace reveals that he left Chicago because he was in the car when his teammate Rashard Rucker ran over a drunken homeless person in a hit-and-run accident.
34	12	"Rashard and Wallace Go to White Castle"	John Kretchmer	John Enbom	February 1, 2006	2T7212	2.12
When Wallace reveals Rashard's hit-and-run, Rashard and his uncle turn the tables by producing witnesses who will testify that Wallace was the driver. Weevil investigates the Fitzpatricks with Veronica's help, and finds out that it was Thumper who was working with them. However, Thumper organizes a coup against Weevil, and the PCHers beat him and throw his motorcycle into the ocean. Keith discovers that Woody told his daughter Gia not to ride the school bus the day of the bus crash.
35	13	"Ain't No Magic Mountain High Enough"	Guy Bee	Diane Ruggiero	February 8, 2006	2T7213	2.05
At the winter carnival, the cash box with the money for the senior class trip is stolen and Veronica must find it to clear her name. Logan flirts with Hannah, the sophomore daughter of the bridge witness Dr. Griffith. Terrence is accused by Sheriff Lamb of planting the explosive device on the bus and detonating it with a cell phone. He hires Keith to prove his innocence, and reveals that he is a gambling addict.
36	14	"Versatile Toppings"	Sarah Pia Anderson	Phil Klemmer	March 15, 2006	2T7214	2.73
Veronica is hired to capture two criminals; a person stealing from pizza boys and another who blackmails gay students at Neptune High. Logan uses his relationship with Hannah to put pressure on her father to drop his testimony against Logan. Keith finds out that Terrence was at a casino at the time of the bus crash, and could not have used his cell phone. Keith uses this information as an alibi and Terrence is released, but Lamb refuses to drop the charges. Veronica finds explosives and detonators in the garage where Terrence keeps his cars.
37	15	"The Quick and the Wed"	Rick Rosenthal	John Serge	March 22, 2006	2T7215	2.34
Veronica must find a missing bride-to-be who disappeared after her bachelorette party. Dr. Griffith agrees to drop his testimony after Logan stops seeing Hannah. Sheriff Lamb issues a warrant for Terrance's arrest, charging him with eight counts of murder. Kendall visits Aaron in prison, and she asks him to invest in Phoenix Land Trust. Aaron agrees to give her money if she can retrieve some of Duncan's hair.
38	16	"The Rapes of Graff"	Michael Fields	John Enbom	March 29, 2006	2T7216	2.15
On a visit to Hearst College, Veronica runs into ex-boyfriend and drug dealer Troy Vandergraff, who claims to have reformed from his old life. The very next day, Troy is charged with a brutal date-rape and asks Veronica to help prove his innocence. Despite achieving his goals through the relationship, Logan feels guilty for hurting Hannah.
39	17	"Plan B"	John Kretchmer	Dayna Lynne North	April 5, 2006	2T7217	2.85
Weevil, Veronica and Logan try to prove that Thumper killed Felix. Woody receives a video of the inside of his own home, and asks Keith to investigate. When they discover it was filmed months before Woody announced his controversial incorporation plan, he asks Keith to stop searching for the stalker. Veronica and Logan contact the real caller from the bridge, and Veronica convinces him to tell Sheriff Lamb what he saw on the bridge. Weevil believes that the Fitzpatricks ordered Felix's murder because they found out about his relationship with Molly Fitzpatrick, and that Thumper was the one who killed him.
40	18	"I Am God"	Martha Mitchell	Diane Ruggiero & Cathy Belben	April 11, 2006	2T7218	1.76
The victims of the bus crash and a mysterious phrase haunt Veronica's dreams as she continues to search for the person responsible for the crash. Veronica finds out that Meg's parents had been trying to set her up with a Neptune High janitor named Tommy "Lucky" Dohanic. Keith discovers that the family of a bus crash victim won two million dollars from a secret settlement with Woody. Richard took out an insurance policy on his sons a few days after his marriage to Kendall, which makes them worth more dead than they are alive.
41	19	"Nevermind the Buttocks"	Jason Bloom	Phil Klemmer	April 18, 2006	2T7219	1.91
Veronica tries to discover who is responsible for a hit-and-run that killed a classmate's dog. Veronica and Keith find out that Kendall was Cormac Fitzpatrick's partner-in-crime, and that if Cassidy and Dick die simultaneously, she stands to receive more than ten million dollars. Desperate to be free of the brutal Fitzpatricks, the PCHers come to Weevil for help. Construction workers find one of Aaron Echolls' Oscars buried on Kane property, covered with Lilly's blood and Duncan's hair.
42	20	"Look Who's Stalking"	Michael Fields	John Enbom	April 25, 2006	2T7220	1.85
Gia asks Veronica to discover who is stalking her after she receives a video of her brother's soccer game, which is similar to the one received by Woody. The video turns out to be from Lucky, the janitor at Neptune High who used to be the batboy for the Neptune Sharks. Although he is arrested, his bail is paid by the Mannings. Woody enlists Keith to take to the hospital a semi-clad, young campaign worker who had gone to a motel with Woody the night before and was now unconscious.
43	21	"Happy Go Lucky"	Steve Gomer	Diane Ruggiero	May 2, 2006	2T7221	2.09
Aaron finally goes to trial for his crimes, and Veronica and Logan are the key witnesses. Keith and Veronica discover that Woody molested two boys who died in the bus crash. Jackie's father Terrence is cleared as a suspect, but must work off his casino debt. Lucky shows up at Neptune High and threatens Gia Goodman, and is killed by security. Sheriff Lamb tries to arrest Goodman, and Aaron is acquitted at his trial.
44	22	"Not Pictured"	John Kretchmer	Story by : Rob Thomas; Teleplay by : Rob Thomas & John Enbom	May 9, 2006	2T7222	2.42
It is Graduation Day for Veronica and her classmates, but Sheriff Lamb arrests Weevil during the ceremony for his involvement in Thumper's murder. Veronica continues to seek Woody's third victim, who she identifies as the bus bomber and a Neptune High student. Keith searches for Woody himself with the help of Vinnie Van Lowe. Aaron is assassinated by Clarence Wiedman, on orders from Duncan, who is shown relaxing on a beach in Australia. Veronica and Logan resume their romantic relationship.

== Reception ==
=== Critical response ===
The review aggregator website Rotten Tomatoes reported an approval rating of 92% with an average score of 8.67/10, based on 12 reviews. The website's critics consensus reads, "She may have solved the murder of her best friend, but everyone's favorite teen sleuth still has plenty of high school drama and danger to go around in Veronica Mars' successful second season."

Brian Raftery of Entertainment Weekly praised the cast as ingenious, in particular Bell and Colantoni, who he thought kept the season "humming along". Raftery found their characters' "sweet-natured, genuine father-daughter friendship remains the show's rock-hard axis". Eric Goldman of IGN wrote that the season was "entertaining start to finish", with "great" returning characters and a "wonderful array of guest stars". Goldman criticized the main mysteries for not having the "same personal touchstone for Veronica or for the audience", but found the pace pick[ed] up considerably in the final episodes". The reviewer called Bell's performance "Emmy-worthy", showing "an amazing amount of different emotions throughout the season, while maintaining Veronica's trademark wit and cleverness".

Jeff Swindoll of Monsters and Critics found that the focus was less on Veronica than in the first season. Swindoll wrote that although the ongoing bus crash mystery lacked the personal touch of season one, other characters were given more screen time and the narrative was still interesting and enjoyable. Reviewers for UGO Networks declared the second season "much more captivating than its freshman predecessor". Despite the positive reviews, numerous critics were frustrated with the complexity of the second season. Entertainment Weekly thought that the season contained "way-too-ancillary characters and red-herring subplots so extraneous that even the most ardent followers needed a Wikipedic memory to keep track of things". Robert Bianco of USA Today felt that the season was "lost in an overly complex plot".

=== Awards ===
The second season was nominated for nine awards, winning two. Kristen Bell and Enrico Colantoni were awarded with the Family Television Award for Favorite Father/Daughter. The series was nominated for the International Cinematographers Guild Publicists Award for The Maxwell Weinberg Publicist Showmanship Award for Television, and the Saturn Award for Best Network Television Series. Kristen Bell won the Saturn Award for Best Television Actress, was nominated for the Satellite Award for Actress in a Drama Series, and the Teen Choice Award for Choice TV Actress: Drama/Action Adventure. Percy Daggs III and Enrico Colantoni were respectively nominated for the Teen Choice Awards for Choice TV Sidekick and Choice TV Parental Unit. Rob Thomas was nominated for a Writers Guild of America Award for Episodic Drama for his work on "Normal Is the Watchword".

== Distribution ==
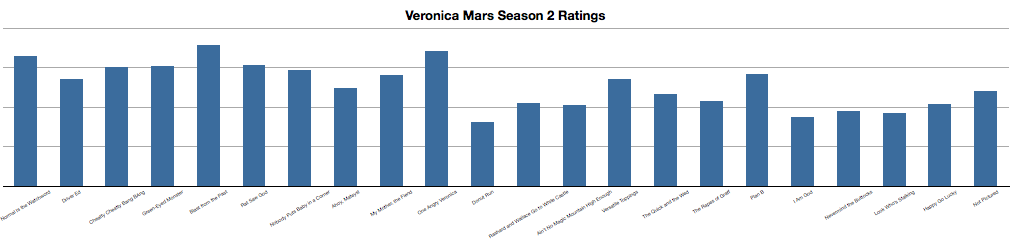
The ratings for the US airing of the second season of the show.

The second season was released in the US under the title Veronica Mars: The Complete Second Season as a widescreen six-disc Region 1 DVD box set on August 22, 2006, Region 2 on August 15, 2008, and Region 4 on September 8, 2008. In addition to all of the aired episodes, DVD extras included a gag reel, a promo trailer for the third season, deleted and additional scenes, including an alternate ending to "My Mother, the Fiend", and two featurettes: "A Day on the Set with Veronica Mars" and "Veronica Mars: Not Your Average Teen Detective". IGN's Goldman was displeased with the minimal number of extras, and criticized the crew for the lack of commentaries. The reviewer felt that although the DVD was worth the episodes alone, the few extras made the set a disappointment. Contrastingly, reviewers for UGO Networks wrote that the DVD box set was as engaging as the season's episodes.

The CTV Television Network, which began airing the first season in Canada in May 2005, decided not to pick up the second season. Instead, Sun TV began broadcasting the season on July 18, 2006. Living began airing the second season in the United Kingdom on June 8, 2006, airing one episode per week rather than showing one every night as they did in the first season. Despite "underwhelming" ratings, Living picked up the series' third season. Network Ten broadcast the second season in Australia on Fridays in 2007.
