= The Rapes of Graff =

- Veronica Mars episode
- Episode no.: Season 2 Episode 16
- Directed by: Michael Fields
- Written by: John Enbom
- Production code: 2T7216
- Original air date: March 29, 2006

Guest appearances
- Michael Muhney as Don Lamb; Daran Norris as Cliff McCormack; Jessy Schram as Hannah Griffith; Rick Peters as Dr. Tom Griffith; Aaron Ashmore as Troy Vandegraff; Michael Cera as Dean Rudolph; David Tom as Chip Diller; Alia Shawkat as Stacy Wells; Taylor Sheridan as Danny Boyd

Episode chronology
← Previous "The Quick and the Wed"	Next → "Plan B"
- Veronica Mars season 2

"The Rapes of Graff" is the sixteenth episode of the second season of the American mystery television series Veronica Mars, and the thirty-eighth episode overall. Written by John Enbom and directed by Michael Fields, the episode premiered on UPN on March 29, 2006.

The series depicts the adventures of Veronica Mars (Kristen Bell) as she deals with life as a high school student while moonlighting as a private detective. In this episode, while visiting Hearst College, Veronica runs into her old boyfriend, Troy (Aaron Ashmore). He is subsequently charged with the brutal date rape of a student named Stacy (Alia Shawkat). Meanwhile, Logan (Jason Dohring) deals with the aftermath of breaking up with Hannah (Jessy Schram).

"The Rapes of Graff" features several notable guest appearances. Michael Cera and Alia Shawkat, two of the stars on Arrested Development, appear as two college students. Veronica Mars was previously referenced on that show, and the pair were scheduled for a guest appearance soon after Arrested Development was cancelled. In addition, Aaron Ashmore returns as Troy Vandegraff, a character who had not been seen since the fifth episode, "You Think You Know Somebody". The episode received 2.15 million viewers and was critically acclaimed, with praise focusing on the guest stars and the episode's case-of-the-week.

== Synopsis ==
In class, Veronica and the whole class are asked to participate in Woody Goodman's (Steve Guttenberg) essay contest. Wallace (Percy Daggs III) invites Veronica to visit Hearst College. Logan abruptly breaks up with Hannah without giving an explanation, leaving her heartbroken. A student named Dean (Michael Cera) conducts Veronica and Wallace's tour of Hearst, when Troy joins the tour late. Veronica mocks Troy to his face, but he insists that he has changed his ways. At a party, one of the students hits on an unamused Veronica. The student gets more aggressive with Veronica, and when Troy begins to defend her, the student punches him. Later that night, Veronica sees Troy making out with Stacy (Alia Shawkat). Keith (Enrico Colantoni) comes to the aid of Cliff (Daran Norris), from whom a briefcase of legal documents was stolen. When Veronica is sleeping, Troy calls her unexpectedly, pleading for help, and Veronica visits him at the police station, where he has been charged in the date-rape of Stacy.

Keith and Cliff watch surveillance footage to try and determine who stole Cliff's briefcase. They spot Sheriff Lamb kissing a blonde, who Veronica recognizes as Madison Sinclair. In order to prove his innocence to Veronica, Troy says that he left his name and number in Stacy's room, arguing that a rapist would not have done such a thing. Veronica checks Stacy's room and finds Troy's name half-erased. Stacy receives a box of someone else's hair outside her door, and Veronica deduces that there have probably been other victims of the rapist, so she goes looking for someone who bought a wig recently, without luck. Dean informs Veronica that the fraternity has a contest about how many girls they have had sex with, and the recruit with the lowest number of "points" is forced to shave his head as punishment. Keith and Cliff confront Lamb with photos of him kissing Madison, and he reveals the woman who stole Cliff's briefcase is a sex worker. Veronica tracks down Stacy's rapist to someone going by "Ice Man." She sneaks into the fraternity's basement, where she is caught by two members.

Veronica confronts the two fraternity members about Stacey's rape, and they deny any involvement. Veronica finds another rape victim, Dawn. Veronica and Dawn tell Stacy that Troy could not have been the rapist because he was on the other side of the country when Dawn was raped. Veronica discovers that the losing fraternity member sent the hair to Stacy, which was his own, because she made him lose the "contest." Logan tells Hannah the truth about why they broke up and admits that he only asked her out so that her father would recant his claim of witnessing the murder of Felix Toombs. The sex worker who robbed Cliff tells him and Keith she gave the briefcase to an unknown man. Hannah and Logan reconcile and are about to have sex when Dr. Griffith (Rick Peters) enters Logan's suite and takes her away. Wallace gets admitted into Hearst. Logan is told Hannah has been sent to boarding school in Vermont. Veronica learns that the Fitzpatricks could have framed Terrence Cook (Jeffrey Sams) for the bus crash.

== Production ==
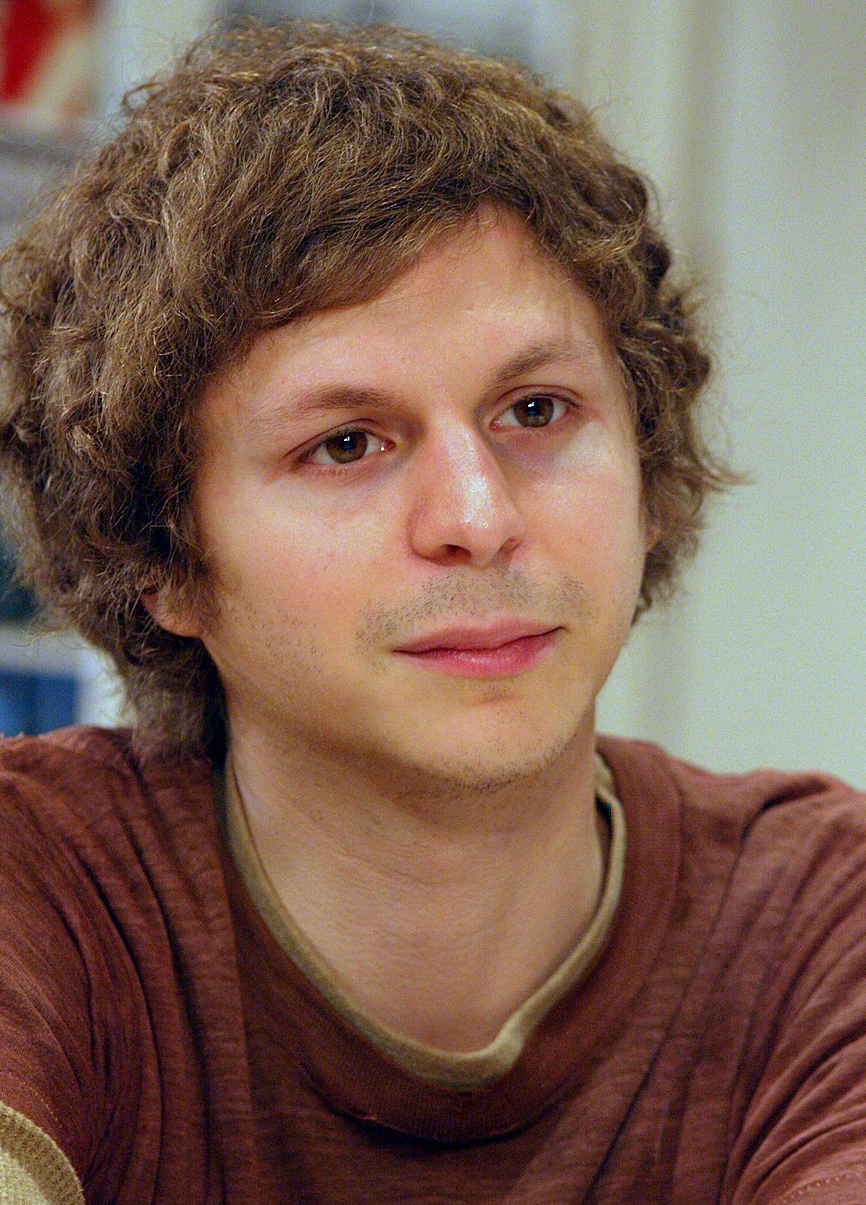
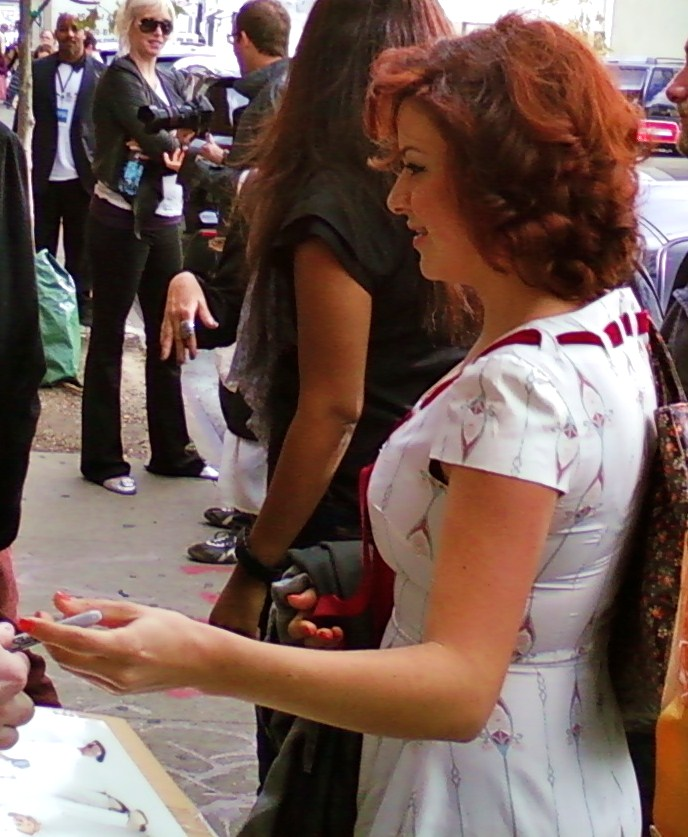
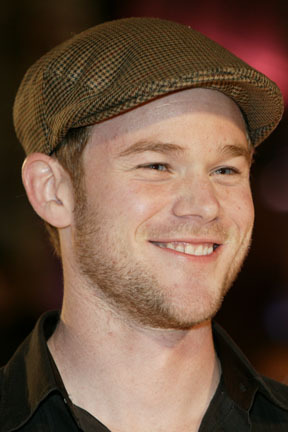
From top to bottom: Michael Cera, Alia Shawkat, and Aaron Ashmore all guest starred in the episode.

The episode was written by John Enbom and directed by Michael Fields, marking Enbom's eighth writing credit and Fields's fourth writing credit for the show. The episode's title is a spoonerism of the title of the novel The Grapes of Wrath by John Steinbeck. Phil Klemmer, another of the series' writers, thought of the episode's title. Both writers knew that this episode's serial rapist case would later be used in the third season. The writers planned for one of Veronica's classmates to be dating Don Lamb before they decided on Madison. The episode features guest appearances by Michael Cera and Alia Shawkat, then best known for their roles on Arrested Development as George Michael Bluth and Maeby Fünke, respectively. Their two characters had briefly mentioned the show in a season three episode titled "Family Ties". The show had previously been alluded to on Arrested Development when some of George Michael's dialogue is redacted and replaced by a subtitle that reads, "reference to off-network high school private eye drama censored by Fox." Series creator and executive producer Rob Thomas recalled contacting them soon after the show was cancelled and learning that Cera was a fan of the show:

Honestly, the day I heard they were shutting down production on that show, I called our casting director and said, 'Book them for "Veronica Mars" as soon as possible.' I didn't talk to Alia, but I talked to Michael and it turned out he's a 'Veronica Mars' fan and is excited to be doing it. So I'm thrilled about that.

Both Cera and Shawkat requested that their roles not be similar to their characters on Arrested Development. Thomas reported their guest appearances to Chicago Tribune roughly two months before the episode aired. Cera was originally slated to return in season 3, but due to scheduling conflicts, the role of Moe Flater was created instead.

The episode also features the return of Aaron Ashmore as Troy Vandegraff, a character who had not been seen since "You Think You Know Somebody", an early season 1 episode. Ashmore enjoyed his reappearance on the show, stating in an interview that "It was kinda nice coming back and being the good guy and not the bad guy for once." After the episode aired, Ashmore stated that "I think Veronica Mars is a great show, so if they wanted me to, I would love to [bring back the character]. I love the show, and I love the character of Troy, too." However, the character would not return to the show after "The Rapes of Graff". "The Rapes of Graff" also includes the final appearance of recurring character Hannah Griffith (Jessy Schram), who appeared in a total of four episodes on the show.

== Reception ==
=== Ratings ===
In its original broadcast, "The Rapes of Graff" received 2.15 million viewers, marking a decrease from the previous episode, "The Quick and the Wed" and tying for 113th of 124 in the weekly rankings with a rerun of Charmed.

=== Reviews ===
"The Rapes of Graff" was critically acclaimed. Price Peterson of TV.com gave a positive review. Although he expressed confusion over the lack of closure, he praised other aspects of the episode. "My pervasive need for justice left me feeling pretty disappointed when we never found out who the utterly repulsive villain had been behind these sex crimes... Other than the lack of closure, though, this was a solid, well-written episode and it was nice seeing the (supposed) redemption of Troy. Television reviewer Alan Sepinwall was very positive towards the episode, praising it as a return to form for the series. "Now that's more like it, Veronica Mars. A good self-contained mystery, a suggestion that the show could do okay once Veronica leaves high school, a gratuitously awesome "Arrested Development" double-cameo, the biggest spotlight yet for wisecracking Cliff, and a fine showcase for Jason Dohring, who's becoming so good that Veronica may need to investigate a case of show-stealing." He went on to laud the supporting characters' performances, especially the subplot involving Cliff and Sheriff Lamb: "Cliff and Lamb are my favorite non-Keith adult characters, so any subplot that has one busting on the other gets the Sepinwall seal of approval."

Television Without Pity gave the episode an "A". Rowan Kaiser of The A.V. Club gave a glowing review, stating that "I have to say, this is one of the most dense and interesting episodes of Veronica Mars yet, on a number of different levels." She went on to praise the return of Troy, the various subplots, and the episode's ambiguous conclusion. The reviewer summed up by saying, "With all that going on, it could have been easy for this episode to fall apart somewhere... "The Rapes of Graff" really managed to do everything it was trying to do quite well. It may have been missing something special to put it in the absolute top tier of Veronica Mars episodes, but it's still a marvelous episode for pulling all those different strands together. Anais Bordages of BuzzFeed ranked the episode 27th of 64 episodes of Veronica Mars, but nevertheless gave a positive review, calling it "awesome". She elaborated, "The banter is excellent, our main character shoots down every sexist on campus, and Michael Cera has a cameo. Even better: The other part of the episode revolves around Cliff’s sexual misfortunes." On a similar list, TVLine ranked the episode 16th.
