= Nevermind the Buttocks =

- Veronica Mars episode
- Episode no.: Season 2 Episode 19
- Directed by: Jason Bloom
- Written by: Phil Klemmer
- Production code: 2T7219
- Original air date: April 18, 2006

Guest appearances
- Tina Majorino as Cindy "Mac" Mackenzie; Krysten Ritter as Gia Goodman; Daran Norris as Cliff McCormack; Adam Hendershott as Vincent "Butters" Clemmons; Rod Rowland as Liam Fitzpatrick; Matt Bush as Billy Greene; John Prosky as Ethan Lavoie; Tommy Snider as Harry Greene; Charisma Carpenter as Kendall Casablancas

Episode chronology
← Previous "I Am God"	Next → "Look Who's Stalking"
- Veronica Mars season 2

"Nevermind the Buttocks" is the nineteenth episode of the second season of the American mystery television series Veronica Mars, and the forty-first episode overall. Written by Phil Klemmer and directed by Jason Bloom, the episode premiered on UPN on April 18, 2006.

The series depicts the adventures of Veronica Mars (Kristen Bell) as she deals with life as a high school student while moonlighting as a private detective. In this episode, Veronica investigates the car that ran over a student Harry Greene's (Tommy Snider) dog, and it turns out that the case is connected to the bus crash mystery. Meanwhile, Wallace (Percy Daggs III) and Jackie (Tessa Thompson) start a relationship.

== Synopsis ==
Veronica is interrogated about the Aaron Echolls sex tapes. Keith tells Veronica that Kendall (Charisma Carpenter) will receive the life insurance on Beaver (Kyle Gallner) and Dick (Ryan Hansen) if they happen to die simultaneously. Mac (Tina Majorino) tells Veronica that her cell phone interceptor has been confiscated and that she was using it to spy on Beaver. Veronica finds Principal Clemmons has changed his locks, and she approaches Butters to get her and Mac into the Principal's Office. Butters agrees as long as Mac goes to the prom with him. Veronica finds the cell phone interceptor as well as a copy of The Anarchist's Cookbook from Weevil's (Francis Capra) locker. Veronica accuses Weevil of blowing up the bus. Harry Greene (Tommy Snider) approaches Veronica and asks her to track down the car that ran over his dog. Veronica is unable to find a matching car in Neptune, so she places an ad seeking information. Veronica tells Keith about Logan and Kendall's relationship, and Keith tells Veronica to find out whether they were together at the time of the crash. Gia approaches Veronica about the mystery car, telling her the car passed the limo right before the bus crash.

Wallace makes a failed attempt to reunite with Jackie. Hector tells Weevil that the Fitzpatricks are abusing the former PCHers. Keith shows Veronica Kendall's high school yearbook, which proves that Kendall stole the identity of a classmate to hide a criminal past. Veronica meets the blind woman to whom the car belongs. Veronica sneaks into the garage and finds the remains of a Fitzpatrick sticker and several guns inside. Weevil talks to Veronica about the PCHers' mistreatment and believes that the list of numbers found in Thumper's locker are an insurance policy. Veronica agrees to help. Wallace meets Jackie at Java the Hut, where she says she has a crush on him, but also says that she has been accepted to the Pantheon-Sorbonne University, meaning they only have a few weeks. Veronica tracks the car and becomes concerned a shooting is about to happen. She calls Keith for help, only to learn she followed the green car to the same house Keith is in. Liam Fitzpatrick confronts Keith in the house, which belongs to Kendall. Liam threatens Keith before Keith fights back. Veronica and Keith successfully escape, with Keith swiping Kendall's hard drive.

The Fitzpatricks are torturing a PCHer, who is also Harry's brother. Weevil arrives and successfully threatens the Fitzpatricks with a list of their well-to-do clients. However, Weevil refuses to rejoin the gang and says that the PCHers are on their own. Veronica finds out that the owner of the car is Liam's grandmother. Eventually, Veronica and Keith deduce that Kendall could have caused the crash. Wallace and Jackie agree to start a relationship, and some new "evidence" surfaces in the Kane case, including some of Duncan's hair. Veronica finds out that Liam ran over Harry's dog, to send a message, but Harry's brother tells her not to tell him so that he won't kill Liam. Veronica tells Harry that she didn't find the culprit.

== Cultural references ==
The following cultural references are made in the episode:

- Veronica says that she watches Animal Planet.
- Veronica mentions James Bond.
- Weevil has The Anarchist Cookbook in his locker.
- Veronica jokingly tells Keith that he was probably watching South Beach.
- Veronica mentions Nash Bridges in relation to the Barracuda.
- Veronica references Dick Cheney.
- Veronica compares Keith to Rick Springfield.
- The elderly woman to whom the Barracuda belongs mentions Vanna White, Pat Sajak, and Wheel of Fortune.
- Veronica jokingly tells Weevil that he has Maybelline eyelashes.
- The episode references Heidi Fleiss.
- The title of the episode is a play on the name of the Sex Pistols album Nevermind the Bollocks.

== Arc significance ==
The Fitzpatricks are in league with Kendall, and Kendall has actually stolen her identity from a girl who died in a car crash. Logan confirms that Kendall was by herself at the time of the bus crash. Thumper's wooden paddle had carvings of the license plate numbers of customers that he had been servicing. In addition, the Lilly Kane plot line resurfaces—Aaron's Oscar statue has been discovered in the backyard of the Kanes with some of Duncan's hair on it.

== Music ==
The following music can be heard in the episode:

- "Dame Esa Cosa (Give Me That Thing)" by Rene Brizuela
- "Treat Her Like a Lady" by Cornelius Brothers & Sister Rose.

== Production ==
"Nevermind the Buttocks" was written by Phil Klemmer and directed by Jason Bloom, marking Klemmer's tenth writing credit and Bloom's second directing credit for the show (after "Green-Eyed Monster"). Despite being credited, Duncan (Teddy Dunn), Dick (Ryan Hansen) and Beaver (Kyle Gallner) do not appear in the episode. The episode's title is a play on words to punk rock band the Sex Pistols' first and only album, Never Mind the Bollocks, Here's the Sex Pistols. The episode featured a guest appearance from Matt Bush, most famous for his role on Glory Daze.

== Reception ==
=== Ratings ===
In its original broadcast, "Nevermind the Buttocks" received 1.91 million viewers, marking an increase from the previous episode and ranking 110th of 114 in the weekly rankings.

=== Reviews ===
Price Peterson, of TV.com, gave a mostly positive review, writing that "I don't know how I feel about the Lily Kane case getting reopened like this, but I still really enjoyed all the Kendall stuff. […] the different Neptune factions have started to come together in an understandable way. Everything is related! Great episode." Television Without Pity gave the episode a "B+".

Rowan Kaiser, writing for The A.V. Club, gave a mixed review, criticizing the episode's focus on the Fitzpatricks while praising the Veronica-Keith dynamic. "While I admire the show's willingness to provide a variety of different explanations for what happened, the thing that prevents me from engaging with it fully is that most of the scenarios, and much of this particular episode, deal with the Fitzpatricks. And to be honest, the show has completely failed at making the Fitzpatricks interesting in any fashion. […] One thing I did like about this episode was that it had Veronica and Keith working together again."
