= Ain't No Magic Mountain High Enough =

- Veronica Mars episode
- Episode no.: Season 2 Episode 13
- Directed by: Guy Bee
- Written by: Diane Ruggiero
- Production code: 2T7213
- Original air date: February 8, 2006

Guest appearances
- Jeffrey Sams as Terrence Cook; Tina Majorino as Cindy "Mac" Mackenzie; Kari Coleman as Mrs. Hauser; Jessy Schram as Hannah Griffith; Jake Sandvig as J.B. Riley; Dana Davis as Cora Briggs; James Molina as Eduardo "Thumper" Orozco

Episode chronology
← Previous "Rashard and Wallace Go to White Castle"	Next → "Versatile Toppings"
- Veronica Mars season 2

"Ain't No Magic Mountain High Enough" is the thirteenth episode of the second season of the American mystery television series Veronica Mars, and the thirty-fifth episode overall. Written by Diane Ruggiero and directed by Guy Bee, the episode premiered on UPN on February 8, 2006.

The series depicts the adventures of Veronica Mars (Kristen Bell) as she deals with life as a high school student while moonlighting as a private detective. In this episode, Veronica is called on to investigate when someone steals $12,000 worth of school trip money at the winter carnival. Meanwhile, Terrence Cook (Jeffrey Sams) talks to Keith (Enrico Colantoni) about his recent questioning related to the bus crash, and Logan (Jason Dohring) flirts with a girl named Hannah (Jessy Schram).

== Synopsis ==
It is winter carnival, and Veronica helps out to raise money for the senior trip. She is sarcastically confronted by JB, the runner-up to the Kane scholarship, and Madison Sinclair. Jackie (Tessa Thompson) is harassed by Neptune High students in the aftermath of her father being taken in for questioning on the bus crash. Keith is approached by Terrence, who asks him for help. At the winter carnival, Logan talks to Veronica sarcastically. Dick (Ryan Hansen) and Logan spot Mac (Tina Majorino) and Beaver (Kyle Gallner) holding hands. A group of streakers causes a ruckus, causing Mrs. Hauser to leave the cash box with Veronica. When Mrs. Hauser returns to gather the box, it has been stolen from the cabinet where Veronica left it. Mrs. Hauser states there is $12,000 in the cash box, and without the money, there will be no senior trip. Veronica and the faculty start looking for the box, and Madison blames Jackie, without any evidence. Logan flirts with a girl, Hannah, at the carnival. Veronica angers Weevil by searching his 6-year-old niece's backpack. Keith continues his talk with Terrence, who asks Keith to prove his innocence. Jackie borrows a screwdriver from Beaver, but Veronica finds it was to scrape off hurtful graffiti. Jackie willingly enters the dunk tank at the carnival so that the others can express their anger at her.

Keith tells Terrence that he is a major fan of his before questioning Terrence about his relationship with Ms. Dumas, the journalism teacher. At the winter carnival, Wallance intentionally misses during his turn at the dunk tank. Dick makes fun of Beaver and Mac. Logan continues to flirt with Hannah. Veronica asks for the ball pit to be dumped as part of her investigation, but nothing is found. Incomplete footage of the time the box was stolen is found leading to several suspects being rounded up, including Dick, JB, Weevil, Madison, and Jackie. Beaver and Mac plan revenge on Dick. Terrence elaborates on his relationship with Ms. Dumas, during which she told Terrence's fiancee about their affair. Weevil tells Veronica that everyone who takes auto shop has a copy of the key to unlock the shop. Principal Clemmons and Veronica search lockers and find $3,000 and a bag of pills in one locker. The owner of the locker is revealed to be Thumper.

One of the items in Thumper's locker has a series of numbers on it, which Veronica recognizes to be license plates. While photocopying the item she discovers a page from Mrs. Hauser's test still in the copier. Back in Principal Clemmons' office Mrs. Hauser and Principal Clemmons apologize to Jackie. Veronica takes JB aside and threatens to reveal he is a member of the Tritons unless he confesses to stealing the test, which he agrees to. Veronica then proves that Mrs. Hauser was skimming from the cash box before it was stolen, recovering $6,000. Dick unsuccessfully hits on Madison before approaching an attractive woman claiming to be a student's step-mom and getting in her car. Logan kisses Hannah as her ride pulls up. It is shown that Hannah's father is Dr. Griffith. It's revealed the woman Dick got in the car with is a transgender sex worker hired by Beaver and Mac as a prank. He almost punches Beaver but eventually backs off. Keith tells Terrence he can't take the case, as Terrence isn't being honest with him. Terrance confesses the extent of his gambling problem, admitting that he rigged a game to get out of debt. Keith is angry at him, but now agrees to take his case, believing that he didn't kill anyone. Veronica observes Weevil arrive at school in a car, and tells him that she knows he stole the cashbox, keeping $3,000 and using the other $3,000 to frame Thumper.

== Cultural references ==
A variety of cultural references are made in the episode:

- The senior class wants to go to Six Flags Magic Mountain and ride on Batman: The Ride.
- Dick references O. J. Simpson and Claim Jumper.
- Jackie sarcastically references Grease while talking to Madison.
- Veronica jokingly compares the carnival to Noah's Ark.
- Logan references Jerry Maguire.
- Dick compares Mac to "that chick from Ghost World.
- Veronica paraphrases a line from The Breakfast Club.
- Weevil's niece wears a The Powerpuff Girls backpack.
- Terrence compares his relationship to Ms. Dumas to the main relationship in Fatal Attraction.
- Veronica talks to Weevil about both versions of The Thomas Crown Affair (both the 1968 version and the 1999 remake).

== Arc significance ==
- Sheriff Lamb thinks that Terrence Cook planted an explosive device on the bus and detonated it with a cell phone.
- Terrence asks Keith to take his case and prove that he didn't blow up the bus.
- Terrence admits that he was in a relationship with the journalism teacher, Ms. Dumas, but she turned into a stalker and told Terrence's fiancée about the affair, causing her to break off the engagement.
- Keith gets Terrence to also admit that he has a gambling problem and threw a very important ALCS game to pay off a multi-million dollar debt. Two of the Fitzpatricks broke into his house to talk to him about his debt to them and Ms. Dumas overheard them. She told Terrence that she would go public with the story if he ever left her.
- Logan meets and begins dating Hannah Griffith.
- Veronica finds a wooden paddle in Thumper's locker with what appears to be license plate numbers carved into it. She makes a copy of it.

== Production ==
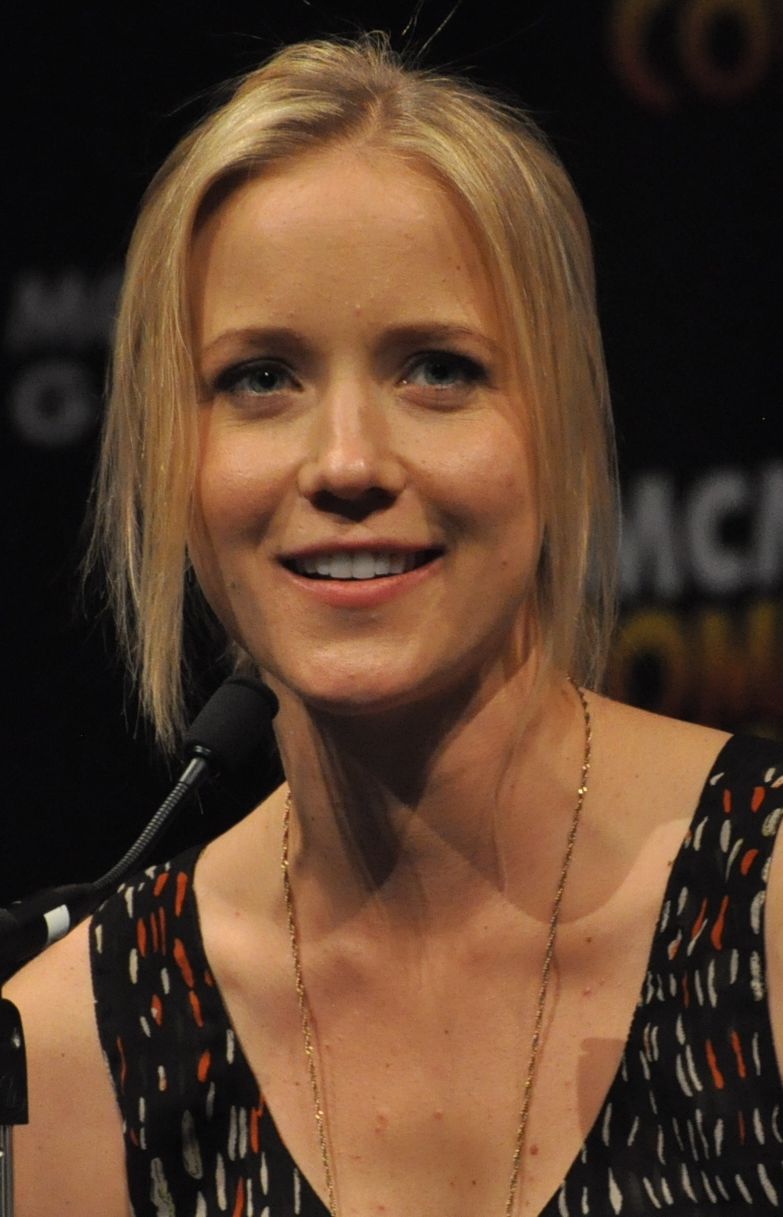
Jessy Schram (pictured) makes her first appearance in "Ain't No Magic Mountain High Enough".

The episode was written by Diane Ruggiero and directed by Guy Bee, marking Ruggiero's tenth writing credit and Bee's third and final directing credit for the show. "Ain't No Magic Mountain High Enough" marks the first appearance of the recurring character of Hannah Griffith (Jessy Schram), a love interest for Logan. On her role in the show, Schram commented "This was the first time I got to guest star and be part of a show. So going down to San Diego was an experience on its own, but it was a very clean, fresh set, that set. And the people were all so nice. Kristen definitely set the bar of just being so sweet and supportive. It really did feel like we were all part of a little Breakfast Club that was down there doing it." The episode's title refers to the Motown song by Marvin Gaye and Tammi Terrell called "Ain't No Mountain High Enough" as well as Six Flags Magic Mountain.

== Reception ==
=== Ratings ===
In its original broadcast, the episode received 2.05 million viewers, marking a decrease in .07 million viewers from the previous episode, "Rashard and Wallace Go to White Castle".

=== Reviews ===
The episode was critically acclaimed. Television Without Pity gave the episode an "A". Rowan Kaiser, writing for The A.V. Club, gave a glowing review, highlighting the character development (particularly of Jackie) and the narrative structure of the episode. "That form also means there's a conceptual bottle episode…Although usually the bottle episode is done to save money, something I doubt is the case with "Magic Mountain" and its big set and array of guest stars, it still has those strengths." Summing up her review, the reviewer wrote, " 'Ain't No Magic Mountain High Enough" did pretty much everything I wanted from a Veronica Mars episode. It moved the main plot forward, it had a fun case of the week, and the characters [sic] work was magnificent on multiple fronts."

Price Peterson of TV.com also gave a positive review, writing that "This episode was jam-packed with plotlines! I liked that it unfolded in more or less the same location and in something closer to real-time than usual. Add to that some surprising twists plus the righteous downfall of Neptune High's most loathsome teacher, and this episode just worked."
