= Plan B (Veronica Mars) =

- Veronica Mars episode
- Episode no.: Season 2 Episode 17
- Directed by: John T. Kretchmer
- Written by: Dayna Lynne North
- Production code: 2T7217
- Original air date: April 5, 2006

Guest appearances
- Michael Muhney as Don Lamb; Krysten Ritter as Gia Goodman; James Molina as Eduardo "Thumper" Orozco; Tina Majorino as Cindy "Mac" Mackenzie; Annie Campbell as Molly Fitzpatrick; Taylor Sheridan as Danny Boyd; Rod Rowland as Liam Fitzpatrick; Brandon Hillock as Deputy Jerry Sacks; Steve Guttenberg as Woody Goodman

Episode chronology
← Previous "The Rapes of Graff"	Next → "I Am God"
- Veronica Mars season 2

"Plan B" is the seventeenth episode of the second season of the American mystery television series Veronica Mars, and the thirty-ninth episode overall. Written by Dayna Lynne North and directed by John T. Kretchmer, the episode premiered on UPN on April 5, 2006.

The series depicts the adventures of Veronica Mars (Kristen Bell) as she deals with life as a high school student while moonlighting as a private detective. In this episode, Weevil (Francis Capra) asks Veronica for help in proving that Thumper (James Molina) killed Felix. Meanwhile, Wallace (Percy Daggs III) breaks up with Jane (Valorie Curry), and Mac (Tina Majorino) confronts Cassidy (Kyle Gallner) about his hesitance to engage in an intimate physical relationship with her.

== Synopsis ==
Logan (Jason Dohring) wins the essay contest to become Woody Goodman's (Steve Guttenberg) intern, and Veronica taunts him about having plagiarized it. Weevil (Francis Capra) flashes back to a conversation with Felix in which Felix talked about marrying and having kids. Weevil asks Veronica to help prove that Thumper killed Felix, but it is risky because Thumper has leverage: a video of Weevil beating up David "Curly" Moran. In study hall, Wallace and Jackie (Tessa Thompson) bond, and they agree to hang out together. Beaver encourages Mac to ask him to the Sadie Hawkins dance. Veronica asks Logan about the night of Felix's murder, and he says the witness drove a San Diego Seafood truck. Woody assigns Logan to sort his mail, during which Logan discovers a DVD with footage secretly filmed inside Woody’s house. Keith (Enrico Colantoni) agrees to investigate. Veronica and Logan track down the truck driver, who denies seeing anything before telling them he is worried about the safety of his family. Veronica reports the dead-end to Weevil, who suggests Felix was killed because of his relationship with Molly Fitzpatrick (Annie Campbell).

Mac goes to Veronica for advice about why Beaver isn’t trying to be intimate with her. Weevil asks Molly about Felix and gives her a toy truck he says was Felix’s. To save him from being embarrassed by bullies, Jackie asks a disabled boy to the dance. Logan discovers Goodman's signature stamp. At The River Styx bar, Liam Fitzpatrick becomes enraged when Molly mentions Felix’s murder, a conversation Veronica and Weevil record using a bug hidden in the toy truck. Veronica and Weevil take the recording to Sheriff Lamb (Michael Muhney), who is dismissive of their evidence. Frustrated, Weevil decides to implement “Plan B,” although Veronica pleads for more time to get proof. Keith deduces that the video was recorded before Woody went public with incorporation, so he suggests another motive. Outside the Fitzpatricks' church, Weevil chloroforms Thumper and steals his bag of drug money. However, he is seen by two children. At the Sadie Hawkins dance, Gia pesters Logan. Wallace kisses Jackie, who rejects him; Jane finds out, but she forgives Wallace and blames Jackie. Beaver resists Mac’s pushes for intimacy. Veronica asks Logan to dance to prevent him from snapping at Gia.

Thumper tells the Fitzpatricks he lost their money, but they find it in his bike and believe he tried to cheat them. The Fitzpatricks gag him and cuff him to a urinal in an unspecified location. Woody tells Keith that a disgruntled ex-gardener shot the footage and asks for the DVD back; Keith returns it but keeps a copy. After Veronica talks to his wife, the truck driver agrees to testify against Thumper. Wallace breaks up with Jane because he still has feelings for Jackie, but Jackie spurns Wallace to protect her reputation. Mac confronts Beaver about their lack of intimacy, but this pushes him to break up with her. A demolition worker finds Thumper's motorcycle locked in the condemned stadium. As Logan depresses the plunger, Thumper is shown struggling against his cuffs in the stadium, and he is implied to be killed when the stadium is demolished. Weevil gives confession at the church.

== Cultural references ==
The following cultural references are made in the episode:

- Veronica and Logan watched Easy Rider the previous summer.
- Veronica tries to make the Shocker, but ends up making the scout's honor sign.
- Wallace compares Jackie to Superman.
- Logan playfully tweaks a famous quote from the Inauguration of John F. Kennedy.
- Logan also references the Big Stick ideology.
- Veronica calls Logan Deputy Dawg.
- Logan quotes a line from The Breakfast Club.
- When Weevil tells Veronica about Felix's relationship with Molly Fitzpatrick, Veronica responds, "Good Golly, Miss Molly".
- Liam Fitzpatrick sarcastically uses the lyrics to "On the Good Ship Lollipop" to insult Molly.
- Veronica calls Weevil Dirty Harry.
- After Weevil objects to this remark, Veronica calls him Dirty Sanchez.

== Arc significance ==
- The PCHers got an anonymous call saying that "Curly" Moran was responsible for the bus crash. Weevil claims that he beat Curly to save his life—otherwise, the rest of the PCHers would have thrown him off a cliff.
- Woody Goodman receives a video of the inside of his own home. He and Keith figure that it was sent by someone against incorporation, but it turns out that the video was shot in November, months before Woody announced his incorporation plan. Woody says that an angry former gardener is responsible, and asks Keith to stop working on finding the stalker.
- Veronica and Logan contact the real 911 caller from the bridge, but he is reluctant to talk, citing fear that the PCHers will come after his wife and child.
- Weevil thinks the Fitzpatricks ordered the hit on Felix because they found out about Felix's relationship with Molly Fitzpatrick. Weevil thinks Thumper was the one who carried it out.
- Logan takes a piece of paper stamped with Woody Goodman's signature from Woody's office while he's there as Woody's assistant.
- Weevil sabotages Thumper's meeting with the Fitzpatricks, making it look like Thumper tried to cheat the Fitzpatricks out of the money he owed them from dealing for them.
- Veronica talks to the 911 caller's wife to get him to talk to Lamb about what he saw on the bridge. The caller tells Lamb he saw Thumper kill Felix.
- Liam and his cronies beat Thumper and handcuff him to a urinal inside Shark Stadium. A construction worker discovers Thumper's bike there before detonation, but insists that no one is inside. Woody gives the order to detonate, and the stadium subsequently implodes—with Thumper inside.

== Music ==
The following music can be heard in the episode:

- "If I Were A Storm" by the Wild Seeds
- "Lost Art" by Mere Mortals
- "Sway" by The Perishers
- "Gravity/Falling Down Again" by Alejandro Escovedo

== Production ==
The episode was written by Dayna Lynne North and directed by John T. Kretchmer, marking North's sixth and final writing credit and Kretchmer's eighth writing credit for the show. The episode features appearances by many of the important recurring characters of the season, including Cindy "Mac" Mackenzie (Tina Majorino), Gia Goodman (Krysten Ritter), Woody Goodman (Steve Guttenberg), and Liam Fitzpatrick (Rod Rowland). In addition, "Plan B" features the final appearance of Eduardo "Thumper" Orozco (James Molina) after the character is locked in Shark Stadium just before it explodes. The episode features a cameo by Furonda Brasfield, a contestant on the sixth cycle of America's Next Top Model. She won the role as a prize for winning a small competition within one of the episodes.

== Reception ==
=== Ratings ===
In its original broadcast, "Plan B" received 2.85 million viewers, marking an increase from the previous episode, "The Rapes of Graff".

=== Reviews ===
Television Without Pity gave the episode an "A". Price Peterson, writing for TV.com, praised the closure of the Felix-stabbing mystery, stating that "I don't know about you, but I was really ready to be finished with the Felix-stabbing plot line, so this episode was deeply satisfying. […] I'm definitely ready for a fresh set of mysteries for Veronica to solve.

Rowan Kaiser of The A.V. Club gave a more mixed review, writing that "It's amusing that last week I was complaining that Veronica Mars wasn't ramping up its tension as it headed towards the end of the season. Clearly I jumped the gun slightly, since both of these episodes did exactly that. "Plan B" was a little contrived—you could see the strings being pulled with Logan's memory and Wallace's breakup—but strong enough to take us into the home stretch."
