= Donut Run =

- Veronica Mars episode
- Episode no.: Season 2 Episode 11
- Directed by: Rob Thomas
- Written by: Rob Thomas
- Production code: 2T7211
- Original air date: January 25, 2006
- Running time: 43 minutes

Guest appearances
- Lucy Lawless as Agent Morris; Michael Muhney as Don Lamb; Ken Marino as Vinnie Van Lowe; Lisa Thornhill as Celeste Kane; Daran Norris as Cliff McCormack; Kevin Sheridan as Sean Friedrich; Marcello Thedford as Super Huge Deputy; Charisma Carpenter as Kendall Casablancas

Episode chronology
← Previous "One Angry Veronica"	Next → "Rashard and Wallace Go to White Castle"
- Veronica Mars season 2

"Donut Run" is the eleventh episode of the second season of the American mystery television series Veronica Mars, and the thirty-third episode overall. Written and directed by series creator Rob Thomas, "Donut Run" premiered on January 25, 2006, on UPN.

The series depicts the adventures of Veronica Mars (Kristen Bell) as she deals with life as a high school student while moonlighting as a private detective. In this episode, after Meg's death in "One Angry Veronica", Duncan (Teddy Dunn) steals his baby daughter and runs away with her. Meanwhile, Logan (Jason Dohring) and Weevil (Francis Capra) work together on solving Felix Toombs's murder.

"Donut Run" was the first episode of the series to be directed by Rob Thomas. The episode also features the final regular appearance by series regular Duncan Kane (Teddy Dunn). Fans often expressed their dislike for the character and his relationship with Veronica, preferring the Veronica-Logan relationship. "Donut Run" was the lowest-rated episode of the series. Nevertheless, it was critically acclaimed.

== Synopsis ==
Veronica discovers Kendall (Charisma Carpenter) exiting Duncan's shower. At school, Veronica and Duncan argue publicly and Duncan dumps her. Subsequently, Veronica acts depressed; Keith (Enrico Colantoni) attempts to console her. Logan and Weevil discuss Felix’s murder, narrowing the suspect list to two; they deduce the killer is dealing ecstasy for the Fitzpatricks. Sheriff Lamb (Michael Muhney) informs Veronica that Duncan has kidnapped Meg and Duncan’s daughter, Faith, and arrests Veronica as an accomplice based on eyewitness identification. Logan asks Dick (Ryan Hansen) to score ecstasy from the murder suspects.

Veronica learns Wallace lied about why he left Chicago. Dick delivers ecstasy to Logan, identifying Hector as his source. Convinced Duncan is heading to Mexico, Lamb orders car inspections at the border. Two FBI agents join the search for Faith and disrespect Lamb. Hector tells Weevil his supplier was another 09er, not the Fitzpatricks. Following Veronica’s tip, the authorities access Duncan's cloud account and learn he bought a boat; after a search they find it, abandoned. Veronica gives Vinnie Van Lowe (Ken Marino), working for Celeste Kane to find Duncan, a confidential letter for Duncan; Vinnie reads it. Sean Friedrich (Kevin Sheridan), the dealer Hector implicated, tells Weevil he wasn’t working for the Fitzpatricks. Wallace (Percy Daggs III) tells Veronica that a teammate in Chicago, Rashard, hit a homeless person with his car but did not stop. Rashard's agent stopped Wallace from reporting it; wracked with guilt, Wallace returned to Neptune.

Veronica receives a call from Duncan, enabling the FBI to track him; they give chase, leaving Lamb behind. In a neighboring apartment, Veronica meets Duncan—still in Neptune, and still her boyfriend. A deputy informs Lamb that Veronica's ATM card was used in Mexico; to outdo the FBI, Lamb leaves to apprehend Duncan himself. Keith finds evidence of Veronica's complicity in the kidnapping. A reporter contacts Wallace about the accident and challenges him to report it as the victim had been left paralysed. Lamb drives to Mexico, crosses the border without scrutiny, and asks after Duncan. Keith angrily confronts Veronica, but when the FBI searches their apartment he covers for her and has removed the evidence. Weevil learns Felix dated Molly Fitzpatrick. Lamb’s car's trunk pops open, revealing empty water bottles and food containers: Lamb had unwittingly transported Duncan through his own border inspection. Vinnie and Celeste’s assistant Astrid, whose resemblance to Veronica has misdirected the authorities' suspicions, pick up Duncan. Astrid has Faith, whom Duncan has renamed Lily after his late sister.

== Arc significance ==
- Duncan escapes Neptune and leaves the United States with his baby daughter, Faith Manning, whom he has renamed Lilly. Veronica aided him in this escapade, and when Keith learns about her involvement, he states that he will never be able to trust her again.
- Wallace returned to Neptune because he was involved in a drunk driving incident in Chicago.
- Weevil and Logan continue to work together to solve Felix's murder and learn that Felix was dating Molly Fitzpatrick.

== Production ==
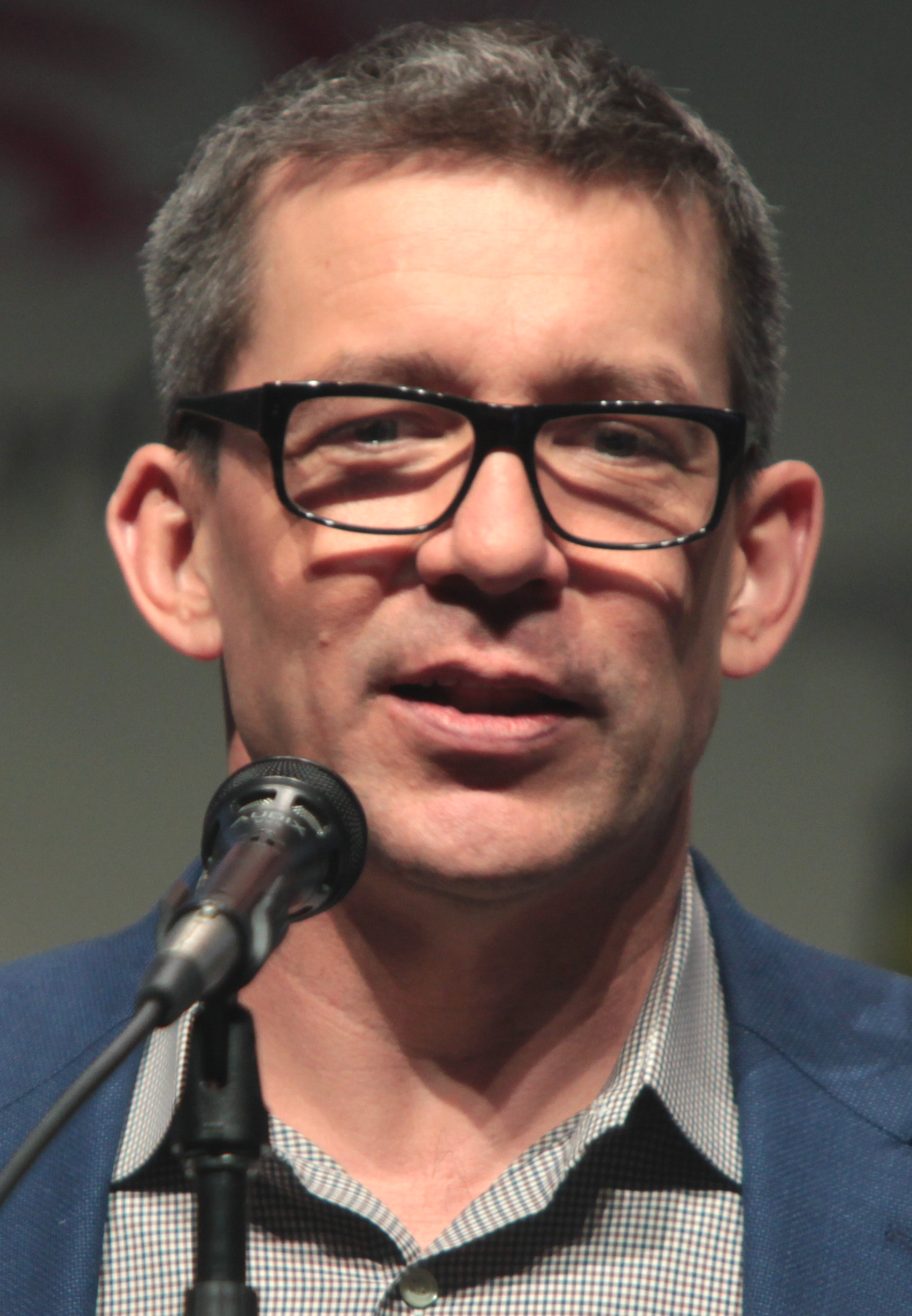
Series creator Rob Thomas (pictured) wrote and directed the episode.

The episode was written and directed by series creator Rob Thomas. Although Thomas had previously written "Pilot", "Credit Where Credit's Due", "Leave It to Beaver", and "Normal Is the Watchword", this is his first directing credit for the show and his first professional directing credit. In an interview, Thomas expressed nervousness around the shoot, especially when to call "Action." Thomas also made sure that he directed an episode that he'd written. When asked about how it came to be that Thomas directed an episode, he replied:

It could not have made less sense, for me to direct an episode right smack in the middle of the season. And it about killed me. For a month there, I was doing two jobs, and they're both very full time, directing an episode and still running the show and looking at cuts of the show, looking at scripts, doing casting — all of that had to keep going while I was directing, and it was really difficult. I think if I direct in the future, it'll be episode 20, 21, or 22, so all the scripts are in, and I don't have both hats on at the same time.

Being a first-time director, the network is, what's the word I'm looking for – they don't want a first-time director directing one of their sweeps episodes, so it created a limited number of episodes that I could choose from.

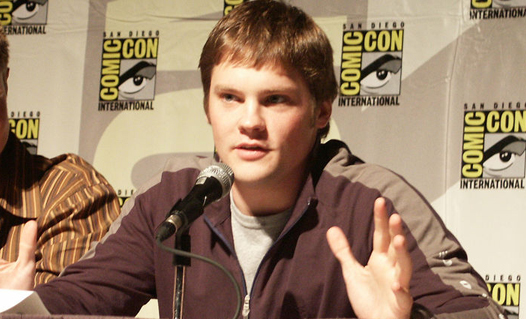
Series regular Teddy Dunn (pictured, who portrays Duncan Kane) made his final regular appearance in "Donut Run".

The episode features the final regular appearance by Duncan Kane (played by Teddy Dunn), after his character was written off the series. Duncan would later cameo in the season two finale, "Not Pictured". Thomas attributed Duncan's departure to the lack of fan interest in Veronica and Duncan's relationship and the more enthusiastic reception to the Veronica-Logan relationship, stating that "You know, we had two romantic possibilities for Veronica. One sort of dominated the fans' interest. And it became clear that one suitor won out."

From the very beginning of the series, fans had expressed dislike towards the character of Duncan. However, he decided to keep playing the character. In a later interview, he said, "Obviously, I acted because I wanted the fans to like the experience. You want your performance to be liked. You don't want to suck. You don't want people to think you suck. That wasn't the goal." Towards the end of the airing of the first season, he stated, "I'm going to be there in every episode next season if we get a second season. So people will either continue to hate me or things will change. Things are going to change for Duncan anyway, as the season resolves. There are going to be different sides of him that you're going to get to see." Before going into the filming of season two, Thomas had told Dunn that he was being written off the show, and Dunn did not react badly to the news, as by that point, it "was actually a decision" for him to return for the second season at all.

The episode features a special guest-starring appearance by actress Lucy Lawless as an FBI agent. "Donut Run" marks the final appearance of recurring character Celeste Kane.

== Reception ==
=== Ratings ===
In its original broadcast, "Donut Run" received 1.62 million viewers, becoming the lowest-rated episode of the series overall and marking a sharp decrease in 1.8 million viewers from the previous episode, "One Angry Veronica" and ranking 118th of 121 in the weekly rankings.

=== Reviews ===
The episode received critical acclaim. Writing for The A.V. Club, Rowan Kaiser gave the episode a positive review, stating that the characters knowing facts that the audience doesn't worked. "'Donut Run' actually does this well, in large part because the heist that we're seeing—Duncan and Veronica stealing the coma baby—requires that Duncan and Veronica stage a breakup, meaning that Veronica seems to be a free, bitter agent for the bulk of the episode." Price Peterson of TV.com heavily praised what he called a "great episode" and "a fitting send-off for Duncan". He elaborated that "as much as he and Veronica were a good match, there's only so much you can do dramatically with a happy relationship, you know? I'm kind of glad she's back to being a free agent again."

Amy Ratcliffe of IGN called the episode the third best episode of the series, behind "Weapons of Class Destruction" and "Leave It to Beaver". The publication stated that "this fast-paced episode…had switches and secrets and is a tad reminiscent of Oceans 11" and that the characterization of Vinnie Van Lowe was "a pleasing little touch." Vulture listed the episode's use of "How Can You Mend a Broken Heart" by Al Green and "Adelaide" by The Old 97's on its list of "16 Perfect Musical Moments from Veronica Mars". Katie Atkinson of Entertainment Weekly ranked "Donut Run" as one of "the 10 essential episodes of Veronica Mars", noting "The Air That I Breathe" by The Hollies as a musical standout. Kath Skerry of Give Me My Remote called the episode the 2nd best of the series, behind "Not Pictured", writing that "This episode is arguably the biggest game-changer of Veronica Mars. It’s also one of the saddest," also writing that it "featured one of the most moving scenes of the series." BuzzFeed ranked the episode 14th on its list of the best Veronica Mars episodes, writing that "so many great things happen in this one."

Reviews were not all positive. Television Without Pity gave a more mixed review, saying that there were "quite a few problems" with the episode and grading it a B−. The reviewer argued that the episode lacked clarity in the supporting characters' involvement in the story and did not provide a satisfying or realistic conclusion to Veronica and Duncan's relationship. TVLine ranked the episode 40th out of 64 on its list of Veronica Mars episodes.
