= Versatile Toppings =

- Veronica Mars episode
- Veronica (Kristen Bell) finds explosives (visible in the bottom right corner) in Terrence Cook's (Jeffrey Sams) hangar.
- Episode no.: Season 2 Episode 14
- Directed by: Sarah Pia Anderson
- Written by: Phil Klemmer
- Production code: 2T7214
- Original air date: March 15, 2006

Guest appearances
- Jeffrey Sams as Terrence Cook; Michael Muhney as Don Lamb; Jessy Schram as Hannah Griffith; Tina Majorino as Cindy "Mac" Mackenzie; Rick Peters as Dr. Tom Griffith; Lucas Grabeel as Kelly Kuzzio; Bradford Anderson as Ryan; Kristin Cavallari as Kylie Marker; Natalia Baron as Carmen Ruiz; Gil Birmingham as Leonard Lobo

Episode chronology
← Previous "Ain't No Magic Mountain High Enough"	Next → "The Quick and the Wed"
- Veronica Mars season 2

"Versatile Toppings" is the fourteenth episode of the second season of the American mystery television series Veronica Mars, and the thirty-sixth episode overall. Written by Phil Klemmer and directed by Sarah Pia Anderson, the episode premiered on UPN on March 15, 2006.

The series depicts the adventures of Veronica Mars (Kristen Bell) as she deals with life as a high school student while moonlighting as a private detective. In this episode, Veronica investigates a series of blackmailings and muggings primarily targeted against Neptune's LGBT community. Meanwhile, Logan (Jason Dohring) and Hannah's (Jessy Schram) relationship develops, and Keith (Enrico Colantoni) and Terrence (Jeffrey Sams) take on the latter's case.

== Synopsis ==
While on his way to deliver a pizza, a pizza delivery boy gets stunned with a taser. Logan and Hannah's relationship develops, and she invites him to watch a movie at her house. Keith talks to Terrence about his case, and he says that he doesn't remember what he was doing at the time of the bus crash. Madison Sinclair publicly makes fun of Marlena for being a lesbian. Ryan pulls Veronica aside and tells her he is one of the pizza boys who was mugged. He admits he had a list of students who belong to an LGBT chat room in his wallet, and the mugger is using the list to blackmail gay students and out them if they do not pay $5000. Veronica talks to Ryan and another mugging victim, and their stories match up. The other victim says that he was headed to a classmate's house. Logan and Dick (Ryan Hansen) hang out to the exclusion of Hannah. Another girl, Kylie (Kristen Cavallari), asks Veronica for help with the blackmailing. Veronica learns that Keith is representing Terrence. Terrence reveals that he was probably at the casino at the time of the bus crash. However, obtaining the security footage will be difficult because of the casino owner's prejudice against Terrence. While hosting Neptune High's student news show, Kylie comes out to the whole school.

Veronica talks to Carmen, asking why the pizza mugger used her name. Carmen theorizes it is because she and some of the other listed students are "coconuts", or Latinas who date white men. Veronica interrogates Kelly Kuzzio, a star baseball player who claims the pizza boy mugger tased him and stole the rims off his car. When Veronica questions his story he drives away from her. Logan and Hannah have their date, and her father, Tom Griffith (Rick Peters), tells him to get out. Logan retorts by saying that he knows his testimony to his murder case is false. Keith talks to the casino owner, Leonard Lobo (Gil Birmingham) who eventually agrees to let Keith see the security tapes. After Logan leaves, Mr. Griffith has a talk with Hannah, presumably about Logan. Veronica waits at the pizza restaurant for the whole night. Keith gets surveillance tapes that show that Terrence was at the casino. He also learns that calls are blocked from inside the casino, proving that Terrence is innocent. Veronica and a pizza boy, Corny, catch a perpetrator, Arturo, who confesses to mugging pizza boys, but is not connected with the blackmailing. Veronica gets Mac to help her get a hard copy of the gay chat forum at Neptune High. Veronica tells Ryan that she thinks that the blackmailer is a person in the chat room, but Ryan tells her the user she suspects died in the bus crash.

Hannah tells Logan that she knows about the Felix Toombs case, and Logan tells her about her father's connection to the Fitzpatricks. Terrence tells Keith that his reputation would be damaged if it was found out that he was in a meeting with the casino owner. Veronica confronts Kelly, who confirms he wasn't mugged and sold his rims to raise money to pay the blackmailer. Hannah checks her father's messages and belongings, and they match up with what Logan was saying about her father's cocaine addiction and connection with the Fitzpatricks. After using a tracking device, Veronica finds that Kylie was behind the blackmailing as she wanted to come out, but Marlena was refusing. Hannah reconciles with Logan. Jackie drives Veronica to a basketball game in a car they borrow from Terrance without asking. Keith and Terrence talk to Sheriff Lamb and eventually attempt to blackmail him with a tape of Lamb blackmailing Terrence. However, he doesn't give in to them. While returning Terrence's car, Jackie (Tessa Thompson) and Veronica find explosives and detonators in his garage, and Veronica tells Keith about it.

== Cultural references ==
The following cultural references are made in the episode:

- The episode references O. J. Simpson.
- The girls taunt Marlena by comparing her to the Indigo Girls.
- Veronica says that her and Jackie's relationship "isn't exactly The Sisterhood of the Traveling Pants."
- Dick compares Veronica to "rich-dude Kryptonite".
- Arturo calls Corny "Shaggy".
- Terrence compares himself to Pete Rose.
- The blackmailer uses the email alias Rick Santorum.*
- Lamb sarcastically says that Terrence and Keith are performing a Jedi mind trick.
- Veronica and Jackie compare Wallace to Michael Jordan.

== Arc significance ==
- Logan tells Dr. Griffith that if he wants Logan to stay away from Hannah, he'll have to drop his testimony.
- Hannah's father tells her about what he "saw" Logan do on the bridge. Logan tells her that her father is a cokehead and lying for the Fitzpatricks, and implores her to "look around the house." Hannah finds coke in the bathroom and a number of calls to and from the Fitzpatricks and The River Styx.
- Keith finds out that Terrence Cook was at the Seven Rivers Casino at the time of the bus crash and couldn't have used his cell phone.
- Keith brings this information to Sheriff Lamb and tries to browbeat him into letting Terrence off the hook by playing the recording of Lamb blackmailing Terrence. Lamb doesn't see the leverage as equal and refuses to drop the charges.
- At the end of the episode, Veronica finds explosives and detonators in the hangar Terrence uses to store his cars.
- It is mentioned that Peter Ferrer was a member of the message board and that one of his last posts was about a very big outing to occur in Neptune.

== Music ==
The following music is heard in the episode:

- "On the 54" by The Dandelions
- "This Machine Alone" by the Fighting Brothers McCarthy
- "Cinnamon Sky" by Karin Brennan
- "I Don’t Know" by Starsailor

== Production ==
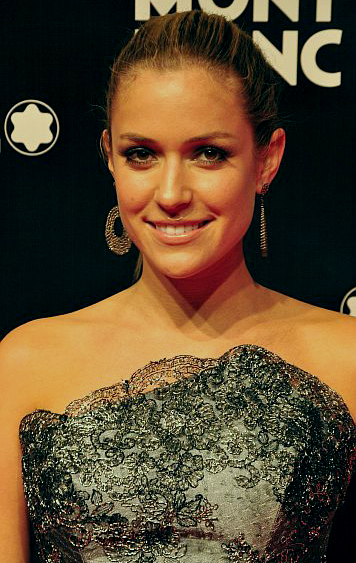
Kristin Cavallari guest starred in the episode.

"Versatile Toppings" was written by Phil Klemmer and directed by Sarah Pia Anderson, marking Klemmer's ninth writing credit and Anderson's second and final directing credit (after "Return of the Kane"). The episode features a guest appearance by Kristin Cavallari, who plays Kylie, a closeted lesbian cheerleader about whom it is eventually learned that she was the perpetrator in the case-of-the week. Then best known for her role on Laguna Beach: The Real Orange County, Cavallari's guest spot on the show was announced several months prior. Entertainment Weekly expressed surprise over the decision to cast Cavallari, writing that "It's hard to believe a teen as brainy as sleuth Veronica Mars lives on the same planet as the clique from Laguna Beach."

== Reception ==
=== Ratings ===
In its original broadcast, "Versatile Toppings" received 2.73 million viewers, marking an increase from the previous episode, "Ain't No Magic Mountain High Enough".

=== Reviews ===
Television Without Pity gave the episode a "B". Rowan Kaiser of The A.V. Club gave a moderately positive review, while saying that it paled in comparison to "Ain't No Magic Mountain High Enough". "After all, both "Magic Mountain" and "Versatile Toppings" are straightforward episodes that easily could have fit in with season one apart from that, and the former is fantastic, while this one is solid. So I'm glad those constraints have been loosened, although given this season's forays into insanity, I may live to regret that."

Price Peterson, writing for TV.com, gave a more mixed review, writing that "The gay subplots of this show continue to trouble me a bit, specifically in this one-step-forward, two-steps-back episode." However, the reviewer also stated that "the surprising saving grace of this episode was Logan and Hannah's developing relationship."
