= Rashard and Wallace Go to White Castle =

- Veronica Mars episode
- The PCH biker gang mutinies against Weevil (Francis Capra).
- Episode no.: Season 2 Episode 12
- Directed by: John Kretchmer
- Written by: John Enbom
- Production code: 2T7212
- Original air date: February 1, 2006

Guest appearances
- Michael Muhney as Don Lamb; Krysten Ritter as Gia Goodman; Daran Norris as Cliff McCormack; James Molina as Eduardo "Thumper" Orozco; Annie Campbell as Molly Fitzpatrick; Cress Williams as Nathan Woods; B. J. Britt as Rashard Rucker; Sterling Macer, Jr. as Monte Rucker; James Joseph O'Neil as Patrick Fitzpatrick; Marcello Thedford as Super Huge Deputy; Rod Rowland as Liam Fitzpatrick

Episode chronology
← Previous "Donut Run"	Next → "Ain't No Magic Mountain High Enough"
- Veronica Mars season 2

"Rashard and Wallace Go to White Castle" is the twelfth episode of the second season of the American television series Veronica Mars, and the thirty-fourth episode overall. Written by John Enbom and directed by John T. Kretchmer, the episode premiered on UPN on February 1, 2006.

The series depicts the adventures of Veronica Mars (Kristen Bell) as she deals with life as a high school student while moonlighting as a private detective. In this episode, Wallace (Percy Daggs III) tells a newspaper that his talented teammate, Rashard Rucker (B. J. Britt) was involved in a hit and run, and Veronica is called in to help. Meanwhile, Weevil (Francis Capra) and Logan (Jason Dohring) continue to work on the mystery of Felix Toombs's murder, eventually leading to a mutiny against Weevil.

== Synopsis ==
Wallace risks ostracism to tell the reporter about Rashard Rucker’s role in a hit-and-run. Keith (Enrico Colantoni) uses information obtained during the investigation into the missing Aaron Echolls sex tapes to steal bus crash interrogation tapes from the sheriff’s station evidence room. Molly Fitzpatrick admits to Weevil she was dating Felix — whom she met at her uncle’s church — but insists that he wasn’t working for the Fitzpatricks. Nathan Woods (Cress Williams) tells Wallace that Rashard implicated Wallace in the hit-and-run, suggesting the journalist Wallace spoke with deceived him. Veronica contacts Cliff McCormick (Daran Norris), who arranges for Wallace to turn himself in. Meanwhile, they create a plan to confront Rashard. While shredding photos from an old case Veronica notices the background shows Terrance Cook with Mrs. Dumas, the teacher who died in the bus crash. Veronica informs Keith about Terrence Cook’s gambling problem.

Weevil meets with Logan at his suite, and they deduce the Fitzpatricks are passing drugs to Felix’s killer using the church confessional. As Weevil leaves, a man is shown watching him leave. Veronica, in disguise as a UCLA admissions assistant, picks up Rashard and some girls in a limousine, intending to meet Wallace; Rashard’s uncle Monte gets in the car and dismisses the girls. When Wallace confronts Rashard, Monte threatens Wallace and the limo driver. Later, Wallace remembers that a drive-through worker saw Rashard driving that night. Weevil and Logan ask Veronica to bug the confessional at the church; she agrees to record video, but not sound. Listening to the interrogation tapes, Keith realizes the dead rat was the bad smell that repelled the 09ers from the bus. Wallace finds the drive-through worker, Guy Abrutti, has disappeared. Veronica bugs the confessional and is almost caught by the priest. Wallace confronts Rashard at a fraternity party; Rashard threatens him. On his way out, Wallace encounters Jackie (Tessa Thompson) flirting with Rashard. Wallace urges her to leave, so Rashard gets some fraternity brothers to lock Wallace in a closet. Outside, Veronica sees Jackie driving off with Rashard to a club Jackie suggested.

Wallace encounters Monte looking for Rashard. Wallace directs him to the club, where a deputy moonlighting as a bouncer steals Monte’s phone for Veronica. On the surveillance tape, Veronica and Weevil watch Liam Fitzpatrick exchanging drugs with Thumper using the confessional. Jackie approaches Wallace and Veronica, and it is revealed Jackie was part of the plot to get Monte’s phone. Jackie flirts with Wallace, who acts friendly towards her, but then reveals he is dating another girl. Weevil confronts Thumper, only to find all the bikers work for the Fitzpatricks. Thumper discloses Weevil’s interactions with Logan, inciting a mutiny and causing Weevil to be tied up and beaten. Weevil accuses Thumper of killing Felix, who in turn threatens to release a video of Weevil assaulting Curly Moran. Nathan Woods uses Monte’s phone to locate Abrutti; subsequently, Monte’s machinations unravel. A bruised Weevil is shown taking the bus to school. Keith discovers that Woody told Gia not to take the school bus home before Dick hired the limo. The news reports that Sheriff Lamb has taken Terrence Cook in for questioning related to the bus crash.

== Cultural references ==
The following cultural references are made in the episode:

- Veronica compares Rashard to LeBron James.
- Keith is reading Those Who Trespass and listening to a Bad Company album.
- Veronica references Steve McQueen.
- Veronica jokingly mentions A Funny Thing Happened on the Way to the Forum.

== Arc significance ==
- Keith steals the interrogation tapes from the bus crash investigation.
- Dick and Cassidy reveal to Sheriff Lamb that their father knew "Curly" Moran as a mechanic. Dick also tells him that the bus smelled bad, which was why he got a limo.
- Gia Goodman tells Lamb that her father, Woody, told her not to ride the bus.
- Keith speculates to Veronica that the dead rat was there so that the 09ers wouldn't go back on the bus, thus the only casualties would be lower- and middle-class students. Veronica still thinks it was targeted to her.
- Veronica bugs the confessional at Father Fitzpatrick's church and shows the video to Weevil. It shows Thumper, one of the PCHers, taking drugs that Liam Fitzpatrick left behind.
- Weevil confronts Thumper, but Thumper has organized a coup against Weevil—Hector's brother works at the Neptune Grand and saw Weevil come out of Logan's room. The PCHers beat up Weevil and Thumper tells Hector to throw Weevil's motorcycle into the ocean.
- Veronica finds a picture of Terrence Cook and Ms. Dumas (the late journalism teacher) together.
- Lamb questions Terrence Cook in relation to the bus crash.

== Music ==
The following songs can be heard in the episode:

- "All Out of Love" by Air Supply
- "Veronica" by Elvis Costello (sung by Britt Daniel of Spoon)
- "Shine More" by Namie Amuro
- "See The Sun" by Scavone
- "Jump Around" by House of Pain
- "I Summon You" by Spoon

== Production ==
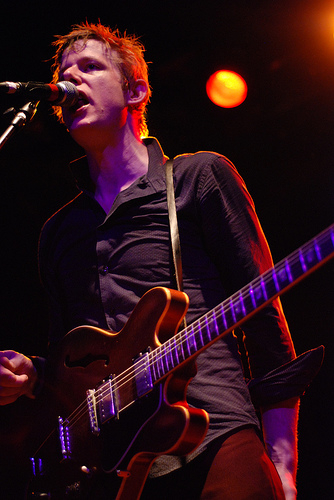
Britt Daniel, lead singer of Spoon, made a cameo appearance in the episode.

The episode was written by John Enbom and directed by John T. Kretchmer, marking Enbom's seventh writing credit and Kretchmer's seventh directing credit. Teddy Dunn continues to be credited, despite his final regular appearance in "Donut Run". In this episode, Jackie Cook (Tessa Thompson) makes her reappearance after a seven-episode absence (her last previous appearance was in "Blast from the Past". The episode's title references Harold & Kumar Go to White Castle. The episode features a cameo appearance by Britt Daniel, the frontman of Spoon, who sings "Veronica" as a karaoke song. Several songs by Spoon had been featured on the show previously. Cress Williams returns as Nathan Woods in the episode as well.

== Reception ==
=== Ratings ===
In its original broadcast, the episode received 2.12 million viewers, marking an increase in 500,000 viewers from the previous episode.

=== Reviews ===
Rowan Kaiser, writing for The A.V. Club gave a mostly positive review. While criticizing Jackie's role in the episode ("Jackie is still a problematic character, and suddenly having her be part of the crew, without any apologies, is a bit too far."), she lauded all other aspects of the episode, including the plot and character development of Weevil, Logan, and other. She also praised the technical aspects of the episode. "I thought this episode had a lot of the technical verve which had been missing from the second season. […] There were three scenes that seemed to add a little something extra with the directing and editing." Television Without Pity gave the episode a "B+".

Conversely, Price Peterson of TV.com gave the episode a more mixed review. He praised it as "a solid effort" while criticizing the B-plot involving Weevil and Logan. "You know, I'm not totally riveted by the Felix murder plot line. I'm just not. It's nowhere near as exciting as the bus-crash case, so I found myself getting kind of bored or impatient every time we curt back to Weevil's shenanigans."
