= The Quick and the Wed =

- Veronica Mars episode
- Episode no.: Season 2 Episode 15
- Directed by: Rick Rosenthal
- Written by: John Serge
- Production code: 2T7215
- Original air date: March 22, 2006

Guest appearances
- Harry Hamlin as Aaron Echolls; Michael Muhney as Don Lamb; Daran Norris as Cliff McCormack; Ken Marino as Vinnie Van Lowe; Michael Kostroff as Samuel Nelson Pope; Rick Peters as Dr. Tom Griffith; Jessy Schram as Hannah Griffith; Valorie Curry as Jane Kuhne; Virginia Williams as Heidi Kuhne; Stacy Edwards as Stephanie Denenberg; Charisma Carpenter as Kendall Casablancas

Episode chronology
← Previous "Versatile Toppings"	Next → "The Rapes of Graff"
- Veronica Mars season 2

"The Quick and the Wed" is the fifteenth episode of the second season of the American mystery television series Veronica Mars, and the thirty-seventh episode overall. Written by John Serge and directed by Rick Rosenthal, the episode premiered on UPN on March 22, 2006.

The series depicts the adventures of Veronica Mars (Kristen Bell) as she deals with life as a high school student while moonlighting as a private detective. In this episode, Veronica takes on the case of a missing bride-to-be (Virginia Williams). Meanwhile, Logan (Jason Dohring) breaks up with Hannah (Jessy Schram) so that her father, Tom Griffith (Rick Peters) will drop his testimony in Logan's murder trial.

== Synopsis ==
Keith (Enrico Colantoni) questions Veronica about the explosives found in Terrence's garage. Later that day, Keith talks to Sheriff Lamb (Michael Muhney) about this information, but he is dismissive of Keith. At Logan's suite, Dick (Ryan Hansen) insists on watching a TV exposé on Aaron Echolls (Harry Hamlin) and the Echolls family. The show is also playing at Hannah's home and at Java the Hut. Veronica serves a bachelorette party and notices the bride, Heidi, with a huge ring on her finger. Lamb searches Terrence's hangar but refuses to tell Keith about his findings. Jane, the bride-to-be's sister, who is also Wallace's girlfriend, comes up to Veronica at school and says that Heidi is missing. Sheriff Lamb holds a press conference announcing that he is about to arrest Terrence Cook for the bus crash. Veronica confronts Logan about his relationship with Hannah. Veronica questions some of the other bachelorettes who describe Heidi as impulsive, and explains Heidi got creeped out by a man she thought was following the group. Beaver (Kyle Gallner) talks to Kendall (Charisma Carpenter) about their company, the Phoenix Land Trust. Cliff McCormack (Daran Norris) talks to Logan about his upcoming trial, encouraging him to take a deal. While scoping out some leads on Heidi, Veronica and Wallace find her car abandoned.

Keith talks to Terrence's car mechanic, who says that he is familiar with the cabinet where the explosives were found and denies seeing anything suspicious in the cabinet a month ago. Veronica talks to Jane about her findings, and Jane points out a particular man. Kendall visits Aaron in prison and goads him to invest in the Phoenix Land Trust, and Aaron agrees if she will visit Logan. A couple of bikers spit on Logan outside a convenience store. Logan goes on a date with Hannah, and her mother, Stephanie Denenberg, cautions her against dating him. Logan uses Ms. Deneberg's email account to send a message to Dr. Griffith. Veronica tracks down the suspect in Heidi's disappearance and finds it is Vinnie Van Lowe (Ken Marino). Veronica talks to Vinnie, but he reveals nothing. Logan and Hannah agree to have sex. Keith presents his evidence for Terrence's innocence, but Sheriff Lamb reveals that Terrence is in surgery. Ms. Dumas's father shot him after he broke into her house. Mr. Pope, the FBLA teacher, talks about the possible downsides of Woody's plan for incorporation. Beaver has increased his lead in the stock market contest.

Veronica tries to call Heidi, but the call goes directly to her fax. Veronica prints out the faxes that were in the machine's memory, and one of them is a flyer from the band of Heidi's old boyfriend, Nick. Veronica successfully tracks down Heidi. Heidi says the wedding is off, due to a friend texting Heidi saying Paul is cheating on her. However, Veronica deduces that Nick did not send the fax nor did Heidi's friend send the text, implying that someone is trying to prevent Heidi from going to the wedding. The whole family waits at the wedding for Heidi, who eventually shows up. Heidi and her fiancé fight and eventually break up at the altar. Kendall makes a pitch to Logan about the Phoenix Land Trust. She sneaks into Duncan's bathroom and takes hair from the drain. Tom Griffith storms in angrily, he threatens Logan and proposes a deal; He will drop the testimony if Logan breaks up with Hannah. At Java the Hut, Logan suddenly walks up to Veronica and says "I think I've done something horrible."

== Cultural references ==
The following cultural references are made in the episode:

- Lamb references Moses.
- In the documentary on Aaron Echolls, there is a screenshot from Clash of the Titans.
- One of the Bachelorettes speaks in the style of Gollum.
- Veronica references Runaway Bride.
- Jane references Home! Sweet Home!.
- Kendall quotes a line from Monty Python and the Holy Grail.
- Aaron channels Hannibal Lecter.
- Logan's favorite movie is Easy Rider.
- Logan mentions Tracy McGrady.
- When talking to Vinnie Van Lowe, Veronica quotes The Big Lebowski.
- Vinnie calls Veronica Curious George-ette.

== Arc significance ==
- The explosives Veronica found in the hangar where Terrence Cook stores his cars were marked "C4."
- Sheriff Lamb issues a warrant for Terrance's arrest, charging him with eight counts of murder.
- Terrence had a mechanic detail each of his cars once a month. The mechanic would have found the explosives on his next visit. Once Keith learns this fact, he concludes that the C4 was planted to frame Terrence.
- Kendall visits Aaron Echolls in prison. She asks him to invest in Phoenix Land Trust, and he agrees to give her money if she gets some of Duncan's hair out of his shower at the Neptune Grand Hotel.
- Terrence was shot by Ms. Dumas' father while trying to break into her house.
- Hannah's father, Dr. Griffith, tells Logan that he'll drop his testimony if Logan promises to stay away from Hannah. The murder case against Logan is closed after Dr. Griffith drops his testimony.

== Music ==
The following music can be heard in the episode:

- "I Want You to Want Me" by Cheap Trick (sung by actress Virginia Williams)
- "Major-General's Song" by Gilbert and Sullivan
- "Lost Art" by Mere Mortals
- "Oh My" by Mellowdrone
- "Sometimes the Sun" by The Lashes

== Production ==
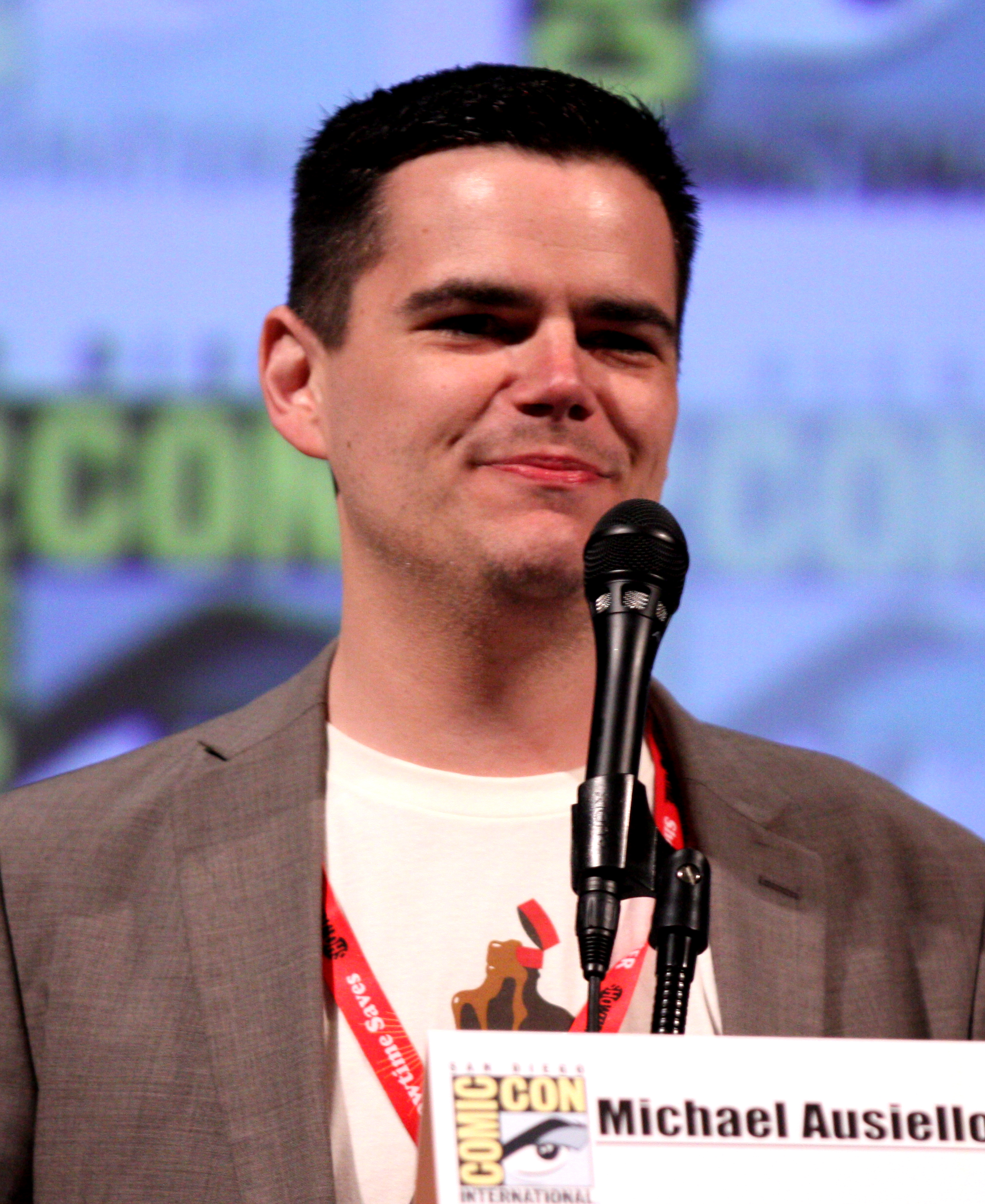
Michael Ausiello guest starred in the episode.

The episode was written by John Serge and directed by Rick Rosenthal, marking Serge's first and only writing credit for the series (and only professional writing credit) and Rosenthal's first and only directing credit for the show. The episode features a cameo appearance by Michael Ausiello, then a senior writer at TV Guide, who played "Blushing Guy", a man at Java the Hut whom one of the bachelorettes pointed out and said that she talked him into giving her his underwear. Ausiello, who taped his scenes on January 20, had his own trailer for the shoot. Ausiello recalled Kristen Bell and him getting "a chance to bond between takes." After Ausiello was done filming his scene, the cast and crew gave him a standing ovation and nicknamed him "Two-take Mike." Ausiello claimed that Bell was in tears after his performance.

The episode was originally scheduled to air on February 22, a month before its eventual air date. The episode's title is a joking reference to The Quick and the Dead.

== Reception ==
=== Ratings ===
In its original broadcast, "The Quick and the Wed" received 2.34 million viewers, marking a decrease from the previous episode, "Versatile Toppings".

=== Reviews ===
The episode received mixed reviews, with criticism centering on the case-of-the-week. Rowan Kaiser of The A.V. Club gave a mixed review, praising the character development but criticizing the case-of-the-week. "The cases of the week are becoming more and more important to each episode. Which is not to say they're getting good—I'd say both of these episodes are a little weaker than normal, to be honest, though not terrible…" Her praise focused on Aaron, Logan, Cassidy, and Kendall. Television Without Pity gave the episode a "B+".

Price Peterson, writing for TV.com, wrote "As I mentioned earlier, I kind of lost the thread on the whole runaway bride stuff. Not a particularly thrilling plot line, but the rest of the main plot moved along enough to make things interesting."
