= Leave It to Beaver (Veronica Mars) =

- Veronica Mars episode
- After solving the murder of her best friend Lilly Kane, Veronica dreams about their reunion. Veronica's final promise to Lilly is that she could never forget about her.
- Episode no.: Season 1 Episode 22
- Directed by: Michael Fields
- Story by: Rob Thomas
- Teleplay by: Rob Thomas; Diane Ruggiero
- Production code: 2T5721
- Original air date: May 10, 2005

Guest appearances
- Amanda Seyfried as Lilly Kane; Erica Gimpel as Alicia Fennel; Corinne Bohrer as Lianne Mars; Lisa Thornhill as Celeste Kane; Daran Norris as Cliff McCormack; Michael Muhney as Don Lamb; Kyle Gallner as Cassidy Casablancas; Ryan Hansen as Dick Casablancas; Jennifer Gareis as Deborah Collins; Steve Rankin as Lloyd Blankenship; Harry Hamlin as Aaron Echolls; Kyle Secor as Jake Kane

Episode chronology
← Previous "A Trip to the Dentist"	Next → "Normal Is the Watchword"
- Veronica Mars season 1

"Leave It to Beaver" is the twenty-second and final episode of the first season of the American television series Veronica Mars. Series creator Rob Thomas wrote the story, and collaborated with Diane Ruggiero to write the teleplay. The season finale was directed by Michael Fields, and was first aired on May 10, 2005, in the United States on UPN.

The finale concludes the storyline of Lilly Kane's murder, as Veronica Mars (Kristen Bell) finally discovers the identity of the murderer after investigating the mystery with her father Keith Mars (Enrico Colantoni) throughout the season. Thomas said that the finale was more ambitious than the average episode, requiring a larger budget and more filming than usual. "Leave It to Beaver" was watched by 2.99 million American viewers on its original airing. Critical reaction to the episode was generally positive, and several critics praised Thomas' use of red herrings.

== Background ==
The first season revolves around Veronica's investigation of her best friend Lilly's murder. Prior to the murder, Veronica was dumped by her boyfriend, Duncan Kane (Teddy Dunn), who was also Lilly's brother. After Lilly was killed, Veronica's father, County Sheriff Keith Mars, accused Lilly's father, popular software billionaire Jake Kane (Kyle Secor), of being involved in the murder. This provoked Neptune's wrath and Keith's ousting as sheriff in a recall election. Veronica's mother, Lianne Mars (Corinne Bohrer), developed a drinking problem and left town. Veronica's "09er" friends—wealthy students from the fictional 90909 ZIP code—forced her to choose between them and her father; Veronica chose her father.

After being voted out as sheriff, Keith opens a private investigation agency, Mars Investigations, where Veronica works part-time. Veronica helps her father solve cases and conducts her own investigations on behalf of friends and acquaintances at school. Veronica discovers new evidence which suggests that Abel Koontz (Christian Clemenson), the man imprisoned after confessing to Lilly's murder, is innocent. As Veronica delves deeper into the murder case, she also works on other investigations, seeks her mother's whereabouts and deals with the aftermath of being drugged and raped during an "09er" party. Things get more complicated when Veronica falls into a relationship with Lilly's ex-boyfriend Logan Echolls (Jason Dohring), who for a time held Veronica partly responsible for Lilly's death and went out of his way to harass her.

In the previous episode, Keith proves the innocence of convicted murderer Koontz, who had falsely confessed to murdering Lilly. Veronica, who believed that she had been raped the previous year at a party, discovers that she and Duncan had sex while under the influence of GHB after drinking spiked drinks; Duncan left that next morning because his mother had told him that Veronica was his half-sister. Veronica spends time with her boyfriend Logan in his pool house, but discovers a hidden video system linking to cameras focused on the bed. Veronica is shocked and goes home, only to find her mother Lianne has returned from rehab.

== Plot ==
After reading a newspaper article revealing Koontz's innocence, Duncan demands the truth from his parents, Jake and Celeste Kane (Lisa Thornhill), who tell him that they arrived home one night to find Duncan covered in blood and holding Lilly's body. Cassidy "Beaver" Casablancas (Kyle Gallner) tells Veronica that on the weekend of Lilly's murder, he had gone surfing in Mexico with Logan and Dick Casablancas (Ryan Hansen), but that Logan had driven back to Neptune to see Lilly. Veronica and Keith discover that a shot glass Logan bought for Lilly in Mexico is on the list of evidence found in Lilly's bedroom and car. Talking to Keith on the phone, Veronica suggests that Logan is the murderer; she is overheard by the leader of the Latino biker gang PCHers, Eli "Weevil" Navarro (Francis Capra), who had a relationship with Lilly.

Keith ends his relationship with Wallace's mother Alicia Fennel (Erica Gimpel), to give Lianne a second chance. He sues the Kanes for refusing to pay the $50,000 reward for finding Duncan; they agree to pay if Veronica signs away any future claim to their estate. Once Veronica signs, Keith shows her the DNA test that proves he is her father, meaning Veronica was never a potential Kane heir.

Logan is arrested, and once released he angrily breaks up with Veronica for providing the evidence against him. He tells her that when he saw Lilly after returning from Mexico, he knew their relationship was over and wrote her a letter, which he left in Lilly's car along with the shot glass. Veronica realizes that the letter was never found, and sneaks into a dinner party at the Kane household to search Lilly's room for it. Duncan finds her in the room, and they discover several videotapes which show Lilly having an affair with Logan's father, Aaron Echolls (Harry Hamlin). Veronica concludes that when Aaron learned that Lilly had taken the tapes and she refused to return them, he killed her in a fit of rage, leading to Duncan's discovery of Lilly's body and his parents' mistaken belief that he killed her.

In Lilly's room, as a hidden person watches from a closet, Veronica calls Keith and tells him that she will bring home the tapes, noting that Aaron is at the party. Before she leaves, Veronica tells Duncan that they are not related. Elsewhere, Logan drunkenly stands on a bridge railing; Weevil and the PCHers arrive and menacingly close in on him.

As she drives home, Veronica discovers Aaron is in the back seat of her car, and intentionally crashes into a power pole to escape him. Although both are knocked unconscious, Veronica awakens first and flees to the back porch of a nearby house, hiding the tapes in various places as she runs. Aaron traps Veronica in a refrigerator on the porch, demanding she reveal where the tapes are, and when Keith arrives, Aaron sets the refrigerator on fire. Keith is burnt while freeing Veronica, and Aaron is hit by a truck while trying to escape. The police arrive and Keith and Aaron are taken away on stretchers as Aaron is read his rights. Jake vows to see Aaron fry for his actions and is also arrested, for obstruction of justice.

Keith wakes up in hospital to find Alicia by his side. Veronica arrives home and tells her mother to leave; she knows that Lianne is still drinking and did not finish her rehab. Lianne packs her bags, taking the $50,000 Kane settlement check as she leaves.

Veronica dreams about floating on pool rafts with Lilly, in a pool covered with flowers, and they say their final goodbyes. Veronica wakes up and answers the door, telling the unseen visitor, "I was hoping it would be you."

== Production ==
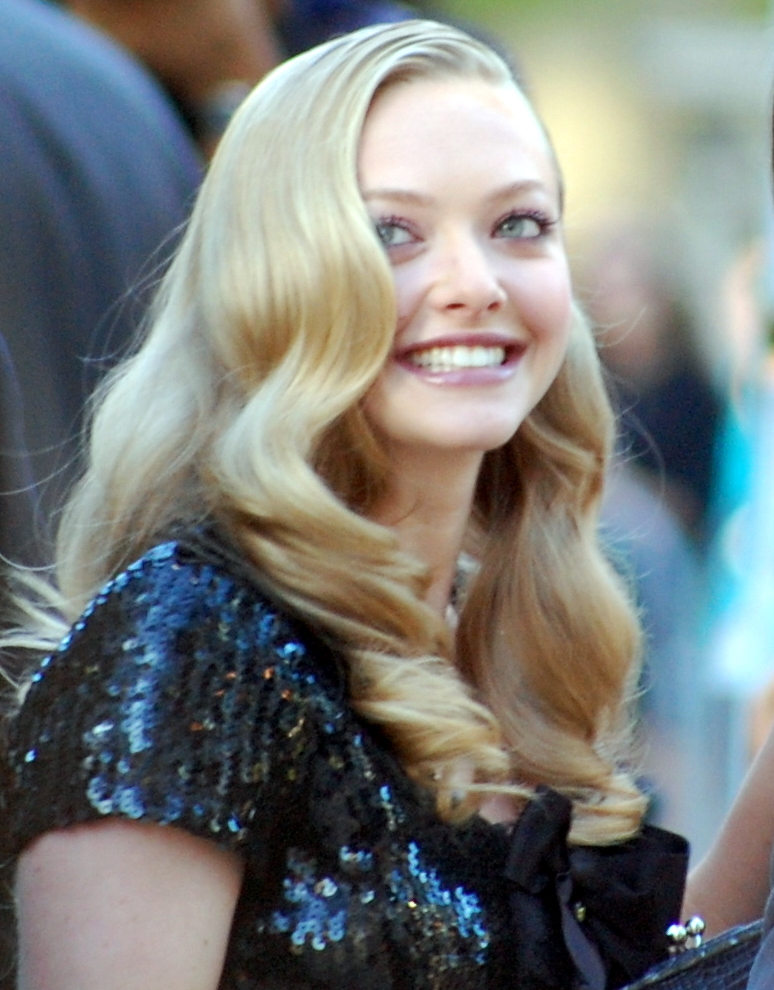
Rob Thomas was so impressed by Amanda Seyfried that he used her three or four more times than he initially had planned in the first season.

The first season of Veronica Mars features a different "case of the week" each episode, and the season-long mystery of Lilly Kane's murder. In addition to developing a separate mystery for each episode, the writers also had to provide clues that would lead to the murder's resolution in the season finale. The murder mystery plot was planned from the beginning of the season and the killer's identity remained the same throughout production. Thomas said that at the beginning of the season, "I know the broad strokes, I know who did it, I know how it was done, I know the big arcs, but we're always filling in the details. Those are week to week. It's a week to week challenge in the writers room figuring out how much information we want to dole out to the audience."

Although series creator Rob Thomas always planned on Harry Hamlin's character Aaron Echolls as the murderer, this reveal almost didn't happen because Hamlin was almost unavailable to shoot the season finale due to a movie he had booked in Australia. However, he decided to continue on Veronica Mars instead.

Although the season's plan was changed very little, Thomas said that Logan became a much bigger character than anticipated. Thomas attributed this to Jason Dohring being an engaging performer, and the crew wanting to write scenes for him. While the budget for each episode was around $1.7 million, an extra $400,000 was spent for the finale. Filming was extended by one full day with the first unit and an extra three days of filming with the second unit. Thomas promised that there would be "more action than you've ever seen on Veronica Mars."

Speaking about the episode's filming, Thomas said, "our final Lilly moment is just beautiful. I think Veronica and Lilly saying goodbye to each other is what people want to see. As much as who killed Lilly Kane." For the finale, Thomas promised "80 percent total satisfaction. People will know who killed Lilly Kane. And there won't be that twist at the end that 'perhaps they didn't do it.' I'm not going to be leaving people like that. However, at the end of the episode, it gives us a pretty big cliffhanger question as well."

== Reception ==
=== Ratings ===
"Leave It to Beaver" was watched by 2.99 million American viewers on its original airing, ranking number 98 out of 112 in the weekly charts. This was an increase over the pilot, which was viewed by 2.49 million American viewers. The first season averaged 2.5 million viewers per episode.

=== Reviews ===
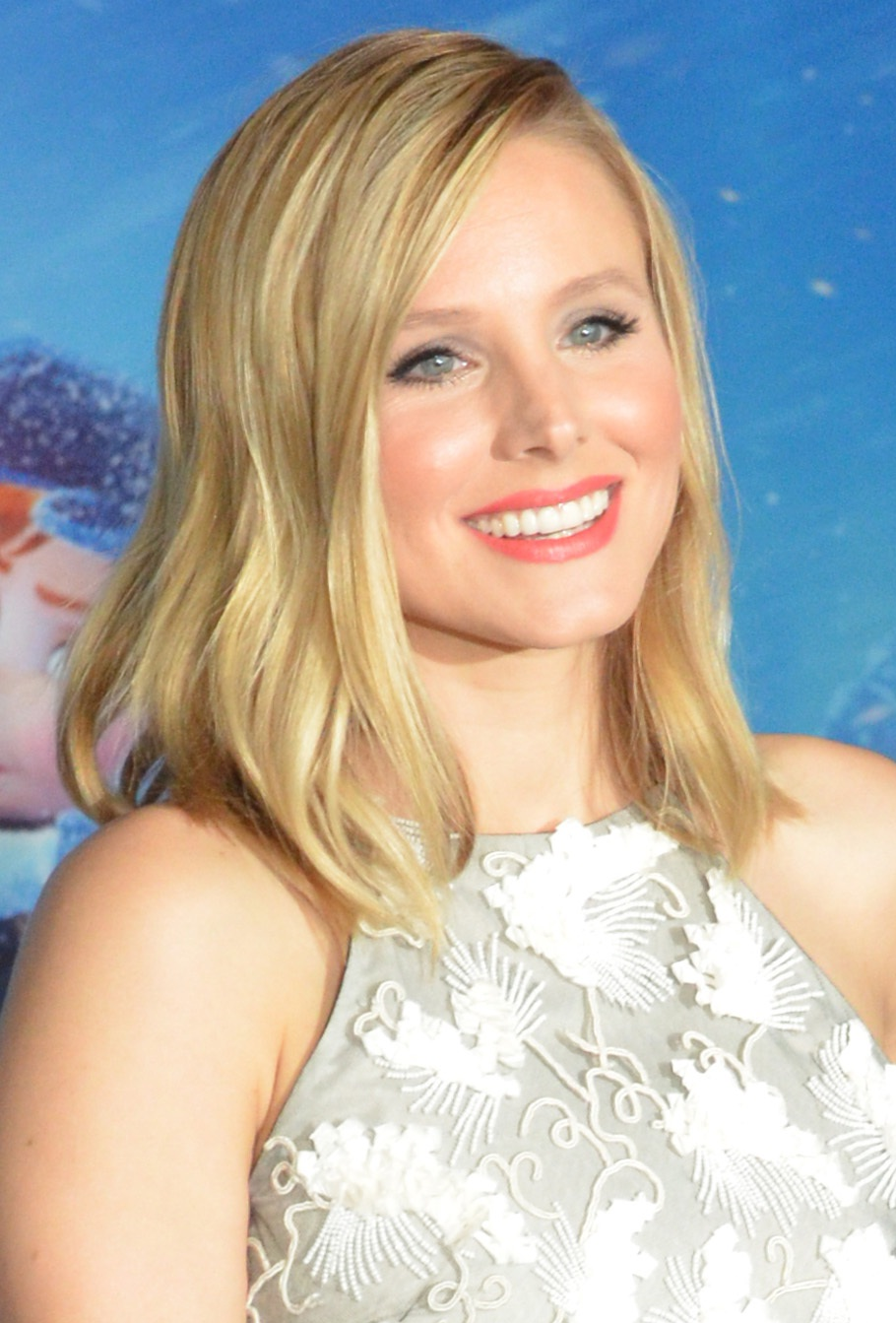
Many reviewers praised Kristen Bell's performance in the episode, with one reviewer writing that she "churned out gut-wrenching, Emmy-worthy scenes."

Jesse Hassenger of PopMatters found the finale to be "breathlessly paced". However, the writer was also dissatisfied with the cliffhanger, and hoped that the second season would not increase the series' focus on Veronica's relationships. Hassenger wrote, "so far, the series has eschewed the relationship angst so common in other teen-centric shows; Neptune hearts get broken, yes, but the show never stoops to that will-they-or-won't-they dynamic. Veronica is that rare television character who's too interesting for love triangles." Filip Vukcevic of IGN thought that while the resolution of the murder was satisfying, it could have been better; "I liked the way everything played out, but I didn't get the Sixth Sense moment I was hoping for. I wanted the season finale to blow my mind, instead all it got out of me was, 'Ah, I see. That's cool.'" Vukcevic wrote that the pace of the season increased exponentially, and was at its best during the final episode. Both reviewers praised Rob Thomas's use of red herrings. Vukcevic felt that "as the finale approaches you are led to believe that the murderer could be any one of several different people - not any easy thing to pull off convincingly. What makes good TV is audience participation. If you feel for a character or are puzzling out a mystery, you're involved. And when you're involved, you're having a good time." Hassenger cited Lianne, Duncan and Logan as the main red herrings.

Mike Duffy of the Detroit Free Press included the episode on his list of "12 season finales you won't want to miss", citing "great writing, a merrily dark sense of humor and Bell's self-assured smart-girl charm" as the main reasons to watch. Screenwriter and director Kevin Smith praised the "seat-of-your-pants" season finale, writing that it managed to "thread the needle with the Lilly Kane murder so well, it never feels marginalized or played out over 22 episodes". Smith compared the year-long murder mystery to that of Twin Peaks, stating that "unlike Peaks, when the murderer is revealed and the storyline wrapped up in the final [episode], it doesn't feel like the show's outlived its relevance; thanks to the crisp writing, the deft fleshing-out of the Mars universe and the endearing cast, you’re left wanting Veronica's story to continue."

Price Peterson, writing for TV.com, gave the episode an extremely positive review, writing that it was "stellar…just a perfect hour of television and a fantastic end to the season. I still can't believe how well they pulled off the mystery. I did NOT see Aaron Echolls as the killer." Rowan Kaiser of The A.V. Club gave a glowing review, praising the Keith-Veronica dynamic, the conclusions to the story arcs, and the final sequence after it is revealed that Aaron is the murderer. "It’s also an interesting choice to have the reveal come about two-thirds of the way through the episode, and have the episode end with a dramatic chase and fight scene. Veronica has so rarely been in direct personal danger that having Aaron Echolls chase and capture her, and having Keith show up for a brutal fight and rescue, is jarring. And I think it is effective." Television Without Pity gave the episode an "A".

Give Me My Remote listed the episode as the third best episode of Veronica Mars, writing "everything about this episode is superb, from the plotlines, to the stunts, and the performances. Kristen Bell, in particular, churned out gut- wrenching, Emmy- worthy scenes." IGN ranked the episode as the best episode of Veronica Mars, writing "Once you realize Aaron is the one, you're glued to your seat for the rest of the episode, possibly hiding behind a blanket. Getting to this reveal was worth the season-long wait." BuzzFeed listed the episode as the second best episode of the series, calling it "one of the most intense, thrilling, and emotional episodes of the show." On a similar list, TVLine ranked the episode as the fourth best episode of the show.
