= Guy Bee =

American television director

- Born: Guy Norman Bee
- Occupations: Television director, television producer, steadicam operator
- Years active: 1990–present

Guy Norman Bee is an American television director, television producer and former Steadicam operator.

== Selected filmography ==
=== Television director ===
- ER
- Third Watch
- Harper's Island
- Criminal Minds
- Veronica Mars (Episode: "Like a Virgin")
- Tru Calling
- Las Vegas
- Law and Order: Special Victims Unit
- Alias
- Kyle XY
- The Unit
- Jericho
- Supernatural
- The Secret Circle
- Ringer
- Revolution
- Arrow
- Beyond (Episode: Last Action Hero)
- APB
- ICE
- Take Two (Episode: It Takes a Thief)
- Blood & Treasure

=== Steadicam work ===
- Ghosts of Mars (2001)
- Magnolia (1999)
- Austin Powers: The Spy Who Shagged Me (1999)
- Deep Impact (1998)
- Titanic (1997)
- My Father the Hero (1994)
