= Jeffrey D. Sams =

Actor

- Occupation: Actor
- Years active: 1990–present

Jeffrey D. Sams is an American actor.

== Career ==
Sams has been a main cast member of several television series, few of which have made it past their first season. These include Medicine Ball, Sleepwalkers, Rob Thomas's Cupid, Wasteland, and Line of Fire.

Sams has had recurring roles on television series such as Strong Medicine, Law & Order, and CSI. He appeared on Broadway in the 1992 musical Five Guys Named Moe, the 1993 motion picture Fly by Night, and in the 1997 motion picture Soul Food.

As of 2005, Sams had a recurring role on Rob Thomas's Veronica Mars as a baseball player named Terrence Cook. His Cupid co-star Paula Marshall previously had a recurring role on the show, and Thomas has stated that - at some point - he would like to reunite Marshall, Sams, and their Cupid co-star Jeremy Piven on Veronica Mars.

Sams also appeared in the Netflix film Reality High. Sams appeared as Adam Clayborne in the 1997 Hallmark Hall of Fame Collection movie Rose Hill starring Jennifer Garner as Mary Rose Clayborne.

== Filmography ==
Year	Title	Role	Notes
1992	Fly by Night	Rich	
1995	Automatic	Harry	
1995	Waiting to Exhale	Lionel	
1997	Just Write	Danny	
1997	Soul Food	Kenny Simmons	
1997	Academy Boyz	Sid Sampson	
2002–2003	CSI: Crime Scene Investigation	Detective Cyrus Lockwood	9 episodes
2005	Checking Out	Dr. Sheldon Henning	
2007	Armored Core 4	Amazigh, GA Corp Support Unit	
2009	CSI: NY	Joseph Winston	Episode: "Hammer Down"
2017	Reality High	Mr. Barnes	
