= Michael Fields =

American film and television director

- Occupations: Film director, television director and television producer
- Years active: 1979–present

Michael David Fields is an American film and television director.

He has directed episodes of Cracker, Veronica Mars, Law & Order: Special Victims Unit, Law & Order: Criminal Intent, Third Watch, Gossip Girl, Homicide: Life on the Street, Sex and the City, Roswell, Melrose Place, and iZombie, among other series.

He also wrote and directed the 1985 television adaptation of Noon Wine for the PBS anthology series American Playhouse. In 1990, he directed his first and only theatrical film Bright Angel.

Fields is a graduate of Wesleyan University.
