= John T. Kretchmer =

American film director

- Occupation(s): Film director, television director
- Years active: 1978–present

John T. Kretchmer is an American film and television director and television producer.

== Biography ==
Throughout his career, he has amassed a number of television credits, namely Buffy the Vampire Slayer, Lois and Clark: The New Adventures of Superman, Angel, Charmed, The Twilight Zone, Hercules: The Legendary Journeys, Special Unit 2 (also a producer), Dark Angel, Psych, Burn Notice, Veronica Mars, Star Trek: Deep Space Nine, Star Trek: Voyager, Moonlight, Army Wives, White Collar, Forever, Nancy Drew, Walker, and The Winchesters.

Prior to a career in television, Kretchmer worked as an assistant director on a number of films such as The In-Laws (1979), Baby Boom (1987), The Naked Gun: From the Files of Police Squad! (1988) and Jurassic Park (1993).
