= Ahoy, Mateys! =

- Veronica Mars episode
- Episode no.: Season 2 Episode 8
- Directed by: Steve Gomer
- Written by: John Enbom; Cathy Belben
- Production code: 2T7208
- Original air date: November 23, 2005

Guest appearances
- Alona Tal as Meg Manning; Tina Majorino as Cindy "Mac" Mackenzie; James Molina as Eduardo "Thumper" Orozco; David Barrera as Carlos Oliveras; Taylor Sheridan as Danny Boyd; Rod Rowland as Liam Fitzpatrick; John Bennett Perry as Alan Moorehead; Bradford Anderson as Ryan; Annie Campbell as Molly Fitzpatrick

Episode chronology
← Previous "Nobody Puts Baby in a Corner"	Next → "My Mother, the Fiend"
- Veronica Mars season 2

"Ahoy, Mateys!" is the eighth episode of the second season of the American mystery television series Veronica Mars, and the thirtieth episode overall. Written by John Enbom and Cathy Belben and directed by Steve Gomer, the episode premiered on November 23, 2005 on UPN.

The series depicts the adventures of Veronica Mars (Kristen Bell) as she deals with life as a high school student while moonlighting as a private detective. In this episode, the parents of Marcos, a student who died in the bus crash, contact Keith (Enrico Colantoni) and Veronica to investigate who has been harassing them by leaving them reminders of their son. Meanwhile, Veronica and Logan (Jason Dohring) further investigate Logan's murder charges.

== Synopsis ==
Duncan (Teddy Dunn) has a dream involving Meg (Alona Tal) and Veronica. Duncan wakes up to hear Veronica reporting her findings about Dr. Griffith (Rick Peters) to Logan, including that he was reprimanded for doing illegal surgery on a man named Danny Boyd. Duncan puts Meg’s letter from the previous episode into a drawer. At school, a boy confronts Weevil (Francis Capra), demanding the cocaine he ordered from 'some biker dude'. Weevil denies knowledge of the drug deal. At Mars Investigations Keith (Enrico Colantoni) meets with the parents of Marcos Oliveres, a student who died in the bus crash. The Oliveres report they are being harassed with reminders of their son’s death and they need proof of who is behind it. Logan drives Veronica to meet Danny Boyd (Taylor Sheridan). Boyd leads her to The River Styx, a local bar heavily patronized by the Fitzpatrick crime family. Boyd explains Dr. Griffith was reprimanded for giving him stitches after a bar fight. A man confronts Danny, demanding to know why he brought Veronica into the bar. Veronica's identity is outed and she is attacked by the man, who demands to know the real reason she is there. Logan barges in, announcing he has called 911, and then forces Veronica's release by holding the man at gunpoint.

Keith tells Veronica that Marcos's parents believe they are being harassed by the school administration so they drop their lawsuit. Keith asks Veronica about Marcos, and she admits she didn't know him. Veronica asks around about Marcos at school, but no one really remembers him. However, Veronica receives an anonymous email about Marcos from someone claiming to have a jealous boyfriend. Keith gives Veronica an MP3 player paid for by the Neptune School District that he found broadcasting Marcos’s voice in Mrs. Oliveres’s car. Veronica confronts the principal, but he denies any knowledge of the harassment. Veronica gives the MP3 player to Mac (Tina Majorino), who recognizes Marcos' voice as that of 'Captain Crunk', one of the co-anchors of a popular pirate radio show. The show was mostly about roasting various Neptune High students, leading Veronica to conclude a large number of people could have had it out for Marcos. Mac tells Veronica she stopped listening after the show went on a 4-week break and 'Captain Crunk' wasn't on it anymore when it returned.

Veronica confronts Weevil about her belief that he set up Tom Griffith for a favor from the Fitzpatrick family, of which Danny Boyd is a member. However, Weevil denies being behind the scheme. Weevil realizes one or more members of his gang are going behind his back, and warns them he will find out who. Later, Weevil talks to a biker, who admits he lied to the police and didn't actually see Logan stab Felix. Veronica and Mac track the origin of the radio signal to a house, only to be shocked when Vice-Principal Clemmons answers the door. They lie about needing to see his son, Vincent, to get into the house. Veronica and Mac find radio equipment in Vincent’s basement room, confirming he is the other host of the pirate radio show. Vincent tells them that Marcos quit the show after going to summer camp, but Vincent doesn't know why. Mr. Oliveres is unhappy with Keith’s suggestion the harassment is unrelated to the lawsuit. Veronica does some digging and finds that Marcos's parents sent him to a conversion therapy camp.

Keith stakes out the Oliveres's house while they are away and finds a neighbor going into the Oliveres’ house using their security code to get some beer from their kitchen. However, that is apparently normal for him. Keith finds a toy school bus in their fish tank and the security code scribbled on the back of a piece of scrap paper from the law firm representing the school district. Logan is kidnapped by masked bikers, who subject him to torture by playing Russian roulette with various parts of his body. Logan swears that he does not remember the night Felix was murdered, and he is let go. Logan manages to steal a cell phone from one of the bikers, which he uses to call Weevil and threaten him. Veronica talks to Vincent about Marcos being gay, but Vincent insists Veronica is wrong and that Marcos was almost beaten up by a jealous boyfriend, which reminds Veronica of the email she received. Keith informs Mr. Oliveres that he can prove someone in the Oliveres family is responsible for the last toy bus and the security code on the paper from the school's law firm, and they should take the settlement. Veronica goes to the house of the girl with the “jealous boyfriend”. She finds the email was sent by a teenage boy named Ryan, and that he is also responsible for the harassment. Ryan explains that he was in love with Marcos. Marcos’s parents saw them flirting, which caused them to send Marcos to the conversion therapy camp. After attending the camp Marcos became depressed. When he died in the bus crash Ryan took revenge on Marcos's parents by haunting their memories. Duncan has another dream about Meg. When he wakes up he opens her letter and says "Oh my God!"

== Cultural references ==
The following cultural references are made in the episode:

- Weevil mentions John DeLorean.
- The bar that Danny Boyd leads Veronica into is called The River Styx.
- Liam references Lucky Charms.
- Veronica compares Marcos to Howard Stern.
- A running joke in the episode is that Mac is Q to Veronica's James Bond.
- Mac asks Veronica to go to RadioShack.
- The episode mentions Rosemary's Baby.
- Logan makes a play on words with Nip/Tuck.
- Logan also jokingly calls Veronica "Mars-wan Kenobi", a reference to Obi-Wan Kenobi.
- Veronica sarcastically mentions Three Little Pigs when talking to Weevil.
- When going into Principal Clemmons's house, Veronica and Mac say lines from The Rocky Horror Picture Show.
- When confronting Victor, Veronica references Pump Up the Volume (film).
- Veronica says a line from In Living Color.
- Veronica notes a place's name's similarity to ElfQuest.

== Arc significance ==
- Duncan agonizes about reading Meg's letter, but finally does.
- Veronica tries to help Logan by getting more information about Dr. Tom Griffith. She goes to see Danny who had a bar fight wound treated by Dr. Griffith, and finds that he's a friend of the Fighting Fitzpatricks. Liam Fitzpatrick spots Veronica and she almost gets hurt before Logan arrives and threatens him with a gun. This marks one of the many times that Logan saves Veronica from danger.
- Thumper, one of the PCHers, tells Weevil that the last people on the bridge with Felix Toombs alive were Hector and Bootsy.
- Two PCHers grab Logan and put a gun to his hand to get him to confess to Felix's murder. He says that he doesn't know anything. After they dump him off, he finds out that Weevil is behind the attack and threatens him.

== Music ==
In addition to the series' theme song, "We Used to Be Friends", by The Dandy Warhols, the following songs can be heard in the episode:

- "Jailbreak" by Thin Lizzy
- "Dakota" by Stereophonics
- "God Is in the Radio" by Queens of the Stone Age
- "Ocean City Girl" by Ivy

== Production ==
The episode was written by John Enbom and Cathy Belben and directed by Steve Gomer, marking Enbom's fifth writing credit, Belben's second and penultimate writing credit, and Gomer's second directing credit (after "Lord of the Bling") for the show. Despite being credited, four series regulars do not appear, including Wallace (Percy Daggs III), Dick Casablancas (Ryan Hansen), Cassidy Casablancas (Kyle Gallner), and Jackie Cook (Tessa Thompson). Also, Mac, played by Tina Majorino, returns in "Ahoy, Mateys!" after being absent since "Green-Eyed Monster". The episode's title refers to a phrase spoken by Marcos when opening his radio show.

== Reception ==
=== Ratings ===
In its original broadcast, "Ahoy, Mateys!" received 2.50 million viewers, marking a decrease of 440,000 viewers from the previous episode, "Nobody Puts Baby in a Corner".

=== Reviews ===
Price Peterson, writing for TV.com, who had previously criticized the twist involving homosexuality in "M.A.D.", was more positive towards this episode's twist, writing that it wasn't "exactly heartwarming that a gay person would feel righteous enough to emotionally torture grieving parents, but that kind of behavior is no more monstrous than typical straight characters' actions on this show." He also enjoyed the scene in the River Styx bar, stating overall that "Ahoy, Mateys!" "was a solid episode. Not exactly fun per se, but thrilling and kinda scuzzy." Television Without Pity gave the episode a "B+".

Rowan Kaiser, writing for The A.V. Club praised Mac's, Logan's, and Duncan's characterization in the episode. "This was easily Mac's best episode. Not that she's been bad in the past, but it might be the most she's stepped out of her role as supporting-girl-geek and into some measure of agency," while saying that "Logan & Veronica are a dark, bitterly ironic tandem," and that "[Duncan's] dreams of Meg and Veronica in this episode aren't quite the supernatural/random level of some earlier events this season."
