= One Angry Veronica =

- Veronica Mars episode
- Episode no.: Season 2 Episode 10
- Directed by: John Kretchmer
- Written by: Russell Smith
- Production code: 2T7210
- Original air date: December 7, 2005

Guest appearances
- Alona Tal as Meg Manning; Michael Muhney as Don Lamb; Max Greenfield as Leo D'Amato; Robert Curtis Brown as Captain of Industry; Ivonne Coll as Knitting Grandmother; Michael Hyatt as Woman's Studies Professor; Robert Maschio as Madison Harwell; Wesley Mann as Ned Flanders Type; James Molina as Eduardo "Thumper" Orozco; Steve Rankin as Lloyd Blankenship; Steve Guttenberg as Woody Goodman

Episode chronology
← Previous "My Mother, the Fiend"	Next → "Donut Run"
- Veronica Mars season 2

"One Angry Veronica" is the tenth episode of the second season of the American mystery television series Veronica Mars, and the thirty-second episode overall. Written by Russell Smith and directed by John T. Kretchmer, the episode premiered on UPN on December 7, 2005.

The series depicts the adventures of Veronica Mars (Kristen Bell) as she deals with life as a high school student while moonlighting as a private detective. In this episode, Veronica serves on a jury in the trial of two '09er boys in the assault of a woman. Meanwhile, Keith (Enrico Colantoni) investigates when the Aaron Echolls-Lilly Kane sex tapes are stolen.

== Synopsis ==
It is almost Christmas break at Neptune High. Veronica tells Duncan (Teddy Dunn) she visited Meg and Meg (Alona Tal) is pregnant. Duncan admits that he already knows because of the letter he stole from Meg's room. Dick (Ryan Hansen) comes up and invites Veronica and Duncan to a party while off-handedly informing them that Meg has woken up. Veronica shows Duncan she kept her hospital visitor pass, allowing them to sneak into the hospital. Woody Goodman (Steve Guttenberg) tells Keith that someone has stolen all copies of the Lilly Kane-Aaron Echolls sex tapes. Keith agrees to help him with the case. Veronica and Duncan visit Meg. Meg tells them her parents want her to give the child up for adoption using a religious adoption agency, and she is worried the child will be abused. Meg also tells them her parents are planning on using Duncan's medical history so he has no say in the matter. After Duncan leaves, Meg apologizes to Veronica and asks her to prevent the adoption if "anything happens to" her. That night, Veronica learns that she has jury duty. Veronica reports for jury duty and is voted jury foreman. Keith talks to Sheriff Lamb, who says that the Sheriff's Department is secure. After the trial, Veronica convinces the jurors to review the facts of the case. The case is about two 09er teens who are charged with the assault of a woman named Anissa. The prosecution and defendant have very different accounts of the incident. Veronica takes a vote, and the results are 11 innocent, 1 guilty.

Keith interrogates Deputy Sacks, who repeats what Sheriff Lamb said about the department's security. The jury holdout identifies herself and makes the other jurors question their votes. Keith then talks to Leo D'Amato (Max Greenfield), who contradicts Sheriff Lamb and says security isn't very good. Leo then says that someone probably sold the tapes. Keith talks to Lloyd, a reporter acquaintance. Lloyd agrees to contact the tabloids. One of the PCH bikers, Thumper, confronts Veronica at work and warns her that the defendants better be found guilty. The holdout makes more observations that support a guilty vote. Keith informs Logan that the tapes are missing, and asks him if he's spoken to Aaron recently. Inga interrupts advising Lloyd is on the phone. Lloyd tells Keith that the tapes are rumored to be on the open market for $500,000. The jurors take another vote, and another juror and Veronica have switched over to guilty. Veronica puts up Christmas decorations around the apartment for Keith. Keith subtly tells Veronica that Anissa's "pimp" was actually a football star. Veronica ties up some loose ends that show that the defendants are guilty. However, one juror refuses to change his vote no matter what. The entire Sheriff's department receives an email about the sex tapes, leading Keith to realize Logan has them.

Logan (Jason Dohring) is watching the tapes and crying. Afterward, he erases the tapes. Keith arrives too late to recover the tapes from Logan. Logan admits he bought the tapes to prevent the footage from being posted on the internet. The remaining juror changes his vote, believing that the defendants will appeal and win. After, one of the jurors approaches Veronica and invites her to attend Hearst College. Veronica leaves work to find that her car is vandalized. Keith confronts Leo, who admits he stole the tapes in order to pay for his sister with Down syndrome to go to a private school. Leo admits he knew he was selling the tapes to Logan, and that Logan planned on destroying them. Leo is seen turning in his gun and badge to Sheriff Lamb. Later, Keith tells Veronica that Meg has died, but her baby daughter has survived. On New Years' Eve, Veronica hears a knock on the door, and Wallace (Percy Daggs III) appears. They spend New Years' Eve together.

== Cultural references ==
The following cultural references are made in the episode:

- The plot-line involving disagreement among the jury is based on the plot of Twelve Angry Men.
- Veronica says "God bless us, every one," a famous line said by Tiny Tim in A Christmas Carol.
- Logan says that he's saved the Daria marathon.
- Logan says a famous line spoken by Blanche DuBois in A Streetcar Named Desire.
- Veronica and Keith watch the Times Square Ball on New Years' Eve.

== Arc significance ==
- The Aaron Echolls-Lilly Kane sex tapes are stolen from the evidence locker by Leo D'Amato. Instead of selling them to the tabloids, Leo sells them to Logan, who erases them.
- The letter Duncan found was to Meg's aunt. Meg was going to go there to have the baby until the bus crash.
- Meg is awake and apologizes to Veronica. She then tells her that if anything happens to her she doesn't want her parents to get control of her baby.
- Meg dies from a blood clot, but her baby lives.
- Wallace returns from Chicago after an absence of four episodes.

== Music ==
The following music can be heard in the episode:

- "The Christmas Song" by The King Cole Trio
- "Edge of the Ocean" by Ivy
- "Diamond In the Mine" by Holidays on Ice

== Production ==
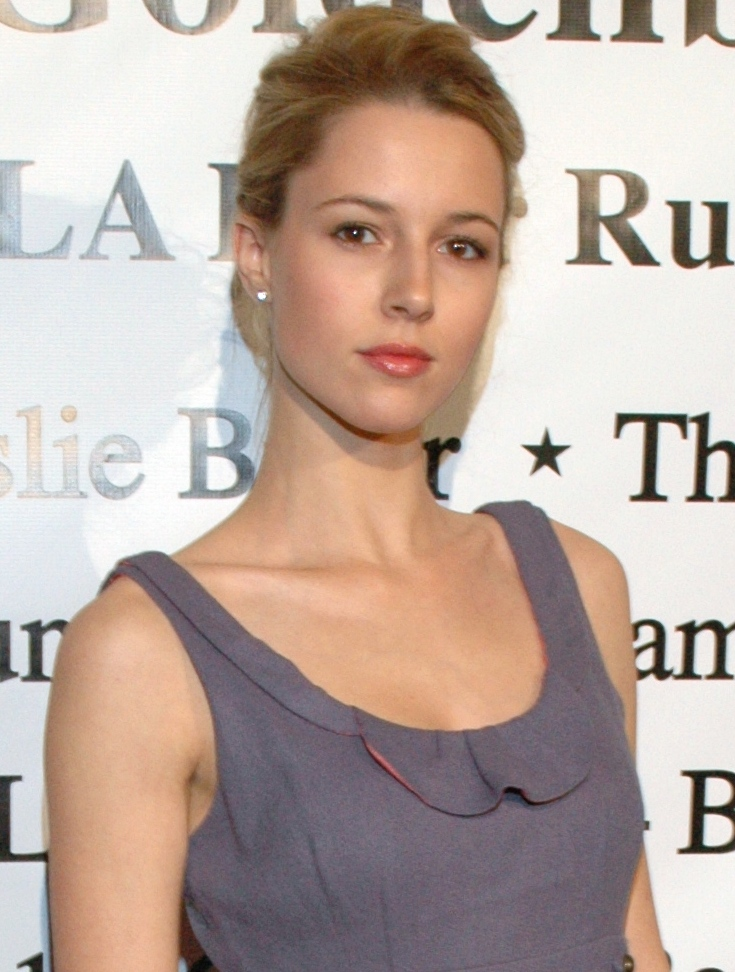
Recurring character Meg Manning (Alona Tal, pictured) dies in "One Angry Veronica". Except for a brief cameo in a dream sequence in "I Am God", this would be her final appearance on the show.

"One Angry Veronica" was written by Russell Smith and directed by John T. Kretchmer, marking Smith's second and final writing credit for the show (after writing the teleplay for "Drinking the Kool-Aid") as well as Kretchmer's sixth directing credit for the show. The episode features the first reference on the show to Hearst College, the main location for the show's third season. Despite being credited, Weevil (Francis Capra), Cassidy Casablancas (Kyle Gallner), and Jackie (Tessa Thompson) do not appear in "One Angry Veronica".

In the episode, the character of Meg Manning (Alona Tal) dies while giving birth to her and Duncan's daughter. Tal appeared in 8 episodes previously. Except for a small cameo in "I Am God", this would be her last appearance in the series. On the departure of Meg, Rob Thomas commented, "The intention was always to get Meg to survive long enough to give birth. What we were really interested in was having that baby. So for our storytelling, it's less about wanting to kill Meg [and more about] wanting to have this baby that's in jeopardy, that's Duncan's baby, that brings a point of crisis with Duncan and Veronica." In addition, the character of Wallace Fennel (Percy Daggs III) returns after an absence of four episodes. The episode's title refers to Twelve Angry Men and its film adaptation. Similarly to both, "One Angry Veronica" depicts a jury deliberating on and eventually changing its verdict. The episode would also be the final episode of the series to air in 2005.

== Reception ==
=== Ratings ===
In its original broadcast, "One Angry Veronica" received 3.42 million viewers, marking a sharp increase in 600,000 viewers from "My Mother, the Fiend." At the time of its airing, the episode was the highest-rated episode of the series, surpassing the season premiere "Normal Is the Watchword". This ratings high would be broken roughly a season later, with "Spit & Eggs".

=== Reviews ===
The episode received a polarized reaction from both critics and fans. Television Without Pity gave the episode a "C+," its lowest rating for the series thus far. Rowan Kaiser, writing for The A.V. Club, gave a fairly negative review, saying that "those last three twists at the end put it at a whole different, odd, bad level." The reviewer criticized the out-of-the-blue nature of the plot twists involving Meg and Leo. "Leo, like Meg, is a character we have history with, suddenly wiped away by something that takes place essentially off-screen. […] It doesn't feel like a betrayal from the character—it feels like a betrayal from the author."

On the other hand, Price Peterson, writing for TV.com, gave a more positive review, saying that "the episode was surprising (and surprisingly heartbreaking!). Also I'm an absolute sucker for Christmas episodes of any show." The episode is controversial among fans, with The A.V. Club even comparing it to the episode "Seeing Red" of Buffy the Vampire Slayer.
