= John Bennett Perry =

American actor (born 1941)

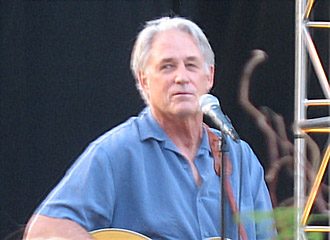
- Perry in 2008
- Born: January 4, 1941 (age 85); Williamstown, Massachusetts, U.S.
- Education: St. Lawrence University
- Occupation: Actor
- Years active: 1967–2011
- Spouses: Suzanne Langford (m. 1968; div. 1970); Debbie Boyle (m. 1981)
- Children: 2, including Matthew Perry

John Bennett Perry (born January 4, 1941) is an American retired actor, singer and model. He is the father of actor Matthew Perry.

== Early life and education ==
Perry was born on January 4, 1941, in Williamstown, Massachusetts, the son of businessman, bank director and civic leader Alton L. Perry (1906–2003) and Maria (née Bennett; 1906–1971). He attended college at St. Lawrence University, where he was a member of Phi Sigma Kappa fraternity.

== Career ==
Perry began his career focusing on singing, being part of the Serendipity Singers and with his stage credits including the 1967 musical Now Is the Time for All Good Men. He also appeared as an extra in the crowd scene in the "Tomorrow Belongs to Me" segment in the 1972 film Cabaret. Perry portrayed the clean-shaven "sailor" in the Old Spice commercials of the 1970s and 1980s.

Perry has appeared in numerous films such as Lipstick (1976), Midway (1976), The Legend of the Lone Ranger (1981), Only When I Laugh (1981), Independence Day (1996) and George of the Jungle (1997), and on such television programs as The West Wing, L.A. Law, Days of Our Lives, Little House on the Prairie, Centennial, 240-Robert, Nakia, Falcon Crest, Murder, She Wrote, Diagnosis Murder and Magnum, P.I.. He played General Douglas MacArthur in the 1989 film Farewell to the King.

In the 1978–79 TV season, he and Stephanie Edwards co-hosted EveryDay, a syndicated daytime talk/variety series that also featured Murray Langston, Tom Chapin, Bob Corff and Anne Bloom. He and Edwards were both nominated for a Daytime Emmy Award for Outstanding Host or Hostess in a Talk, Service or Variety Series, losing to Phil Donahue of The Phil Donahue Show.

He appeared alongside his son Matthew Perry in the 1997 movie Fools Rush In, and in the episode "My Unicorn" of the sitcom Scrubs, each time as the father of his real-life son's character. He also appeared in the episode of Friends with the title "The One with Rachel's New Dress", playing the father of Rachel Green's boyfriend Joshua.

== Personal life ==
From 1968 to 1970, he was married to Suzanne Langford, press secretary to former Canadian Prime Minister Pierre Trudeau. The couple had a son together, Matthew Perry (1969–2023), who also became an actor. After the couple divorced, Langford returned to Ottawa, Ontario with their son, and Perry moved to Los Angeles to pursue a career in acting. When their son Matthew was 14 years old, he moved back to the U.S. to live with Perry. Perry married Debbie Boyle in 1981 and five years later the couple had a child together.

Perry's son Matthew died on October 28, 2023, at age 54, from an apparent drowning, stemming from a ketamine overdose.

== Filmography ==
=== Film ===
Year	Title	Role	Notes
1976	Lipstick	Martin McCormick	
1976	Midway	ARM1c Walter G. Chochalousek	
1981	The Legend of the Lone Ranger	Ranger Captain Dan Reid	
1981	Only When I Laugh	Vincent Heller (Lou)	
1989	Farewell to the King	General MacArthur	
1996	Independence Day	Secret Serviceman	
1996	The Evening Star	Sitcom Parent	
1997	Fools Rush In	Richard Whitman	
1997	George of the Jungle	Arthur Stanhope	
1998	Circles	Bob Miano	
1998	Ground Control	Senator Rutherford	
2002	The Sweetest Thing	Judy's Father	
2007	Agenda	John Linney	
2007	Protecting the King	Vernon Presley	
2008	Loaded	Evan Price	
2011	Bob's New Suit	Buster	

=== Television ===
Year	Title	Role	Notes
1972	Bobby Jo and the Good Time Band	Jeff	Television movie
1973–1974	Police Story	Sergeant Chick Torpi	Recurring role (5 episodes)
1974	Mannix	Steve Walker	Episode: "Walk a Double Line"
1974	Nakia	unknown role	Episode: "The Moving Target"
1975	Kung Fu	Deputy Hank Archer	Episode: "Battle Hymn"
1975	S.W.A.T.	Johnny Brewer	Episode: "The Vendetta"
1975	Barbary Coast	Commander Stark	Episode: "An Iron-Clad Plan"
1977	Little House on the Prairie	Andrew Hobbs / Frank James	Episode: "The Aftermath"
1978	Everyday	Himself (Host)	2 episodes – "#1.1" – "#1.11"; Nominated – Daytime Emmy Award for Outstanding Host or Hostess in a Talk, Service or Variety Series
1978–1979	Centennial	Mahlon Zendt	Miniseries (2 episodes) – "The Wagon and the Elephant" (1978) – "The Storm" (1979)
1979–1981	240-Robert	Deputy Theodore Roosevelt 'Trap' Applegate III	Series regular (16 episodes)
1981	A Matter of Life and Death	Shad Fleming	Television movie
1982	Walt Disney's Wonderful World of Color	Russell Donovan	Episode: "Tales of the Apple Dumpling Gang"
1982	Today's F.B.I.	Parrish	Episode: "Tapper"
1982	Money on the Side	Tom Westmore	Television movie
1982	Seven Brides for Seven Brothers	Eckworth	Episode: "Heritage"
1983	I Married Wyatt Earp	John Behan	Television movie
1983	Little House on the Prairie	Russell Matthews	Episode: "Once Upon a Time"
1983	Teachers Only	unknown role	Episode: "Rex, the Wonder Husband"
1983	Wizards and Warriors	Colter	Episode: "The Dungeon of Death"
1983	Lottery!	unknown role	Episode: "Phoenix: Blood Brothers"
1983	Emerald Point N.A.S.	Joe	Episode: "#1.6"
1984	The Duck Factory	Brett Higgens / Arnold	Episode: "It Didn't Happen One Night"
1984	The Love Boat	George Washburn	Episode: "Only the Good Die Young/Honey Beats the Odds/The Light of Another Day"
1984	Paper Dolls	Michael Caswell	Series regular (13 episodes)
1985	The Other Lover	Peter Fielding	Television movie
1985	I Dream of Jeannie... Fifteen Years Later	Wes Morrison	Television movie
1985	Magnum, P.I.	Stephen Parker	Episode: "Rapture"
1985–1986	Falcon Crest	Sheriff Floyd Gilmore	Series regular (21 episodes)
1986	Hotel	Drew Haywood	Episode: "Harassed"
1987	The Last Fling	Jason Elliot	Television movie
1987	Independence	Sheriff	Television movie
1987	Throb	Bobby	Episode: "Party Games"
1987	Poker Alice	Frank Hartwell	Television movie
1987	Rags to Riches	Tom Honkerson	Episode: "Wilderness Blues"
1987	Pursuit of Happiness	Fast Phil	Episode: "Advice and Consent"
1987	Murder, She Wrote	Judge Perry Sillman	Episode: "When Thieves Fall Out"
1988	Nightingales	Roger Taylor	Television movie
1988	L.A. Law	Richard Lauderbauch	Episode: "Romancing the Drone"
1988	Hunter	Steven Stag	Episode: "Dead on Target (Part 1 & 2)"
1989	She Knows Too Much	Matthew Bream	Television movie
1989	False Witness	Dr. Stiner	Television movie
1991	Over My Dead Body	Raymond	Episode: "Naked Brunch"
1992	Secrets	Dan Adams	Television movie
1992	Coach	Arthur Blackmore	Episode: "Dateline-Bangkok"
1992	Silk Stalkings	Ronald Bunch	Episode: "Irreconcilable Differences"
1993	Civil Wars	Adam Hunter	Episode: "Dances with Sharks"
1993	Murder, She Wrote	Dan Remsen	Episode: "Lone Witness"
1993	Home Free	Judge Quentin Cavanaugh	Episode: "Front Page"
1995	Renegade	Ted Radford	Episode: "Rancho Escondido"
1995	CBS Schoolbreak Special	Winston Halpern	Episode: "Kids Killing Kids"
1995	Eye of the Stalker	Duncan Emerson	Television movie
1996	Pier 66	Senator Powers	Television movie
1996	Night Stand	Colin Hunter	Episode: "Gays in the Military"
1998	The Wonderful World of Disney	Mr. Norman Zapruder	Episode: "Safety Patrol"
1998	Friends	Mr. Burgin	Episode: "The One with Rachel's New Dress"
1998	JAG	Roland Sims	2 episodes – "Yesterday's Heroes" – "Wedding Bell Blues"
1998	The Army Show	Nelson Caesar	Episode: "J. Paul Caesar"
1998–1999	Air America	Frank Arnett	Recurring role (6 episodes)
1999	Veronica's Closet	Byron Blair	Episode: "Veronica's from Venus/Josh's Parents Are from Mars"
1999	Nash Bridges	Frank Morgan	Episode: "Hide and Seek"
1999	3rd Rock from the Sun	Hamilton Bell	Episode: "Dick v. Strudwick"
1999–2000	Family Law	Senator Harlan Bell	Recurring role (3 episodes)
1999–2001	It's Like, You Know...	Barney the Anchorman	Recurring role (3 episodes)
2000	Diagnosis Murder	Robert Brantigan	Episode: "Man Overboard"
2001	The West Wing	Representative Bill. D	Episode: "Two Cathedrals"
2002	Providence	Charles Frank	Recurring role (3 episodes)
2003	7th Heaven	Detective Terry Richardson	2 episodes – "Stand Up" – "High Anxiety"
2003	Threat Matrix	Senator Otto	Episode: "Flipping"
2004	Scrubs	Gregory Marks	Episode: "My Unicorn"
2005	Cuts	Dennis	Episode: "Mack Daddies"
2005	Veronica Mars	Principal Alan Moorehead	2 episodes – "Ahoy, Mateys!" – "My Mother, the Fiend"
2006	Principal Dennis	unknown role	Episode: "Heiress Bridenapped"
2006	Our House	Judge	Television movie
2006	The Closer	Walter Langer	Episode: "Heroic Measures"
2008	Dirty Sexy Money	Hal Matheson	Episode: "The Birthday Present"
2009	Cold Case	Al 'Baltimore Red' Soddenheim '09	Episode: "November 22nd"
2011	Mr. Sunshine	Howard	Episode: "The Best Man"
