= Locations in Veronica Mars =

Veronica Mars is an American television series created by Rob Thomas. The series premiered on September 22, 2004, during UPN's last two years, and ended its original run on May 22, 2007, after a season on UPN's successor, The CW Television Network. It was later continued with a film released on March 14, 2014, and by an eight-episode fourth season. Set in the fictional town of Neptune, the series starred Kristen Bell as the title character, a student who progressed from high school to college during the series while moonlighting as a private investigator under the wing of her detective father.

== Neptune ==
Neptune, California, is the series' fictional setting, a town in California inspired by Orange County. The town is described as experiencing class tension especially through its high school, with the wealthy upperclass inflating the prices of housing and services out of the reach of the poorer classes.

=== Geography ===
Neptune is a coastal community located between San Diego and Los Angeles on the route of California's Pacific Coast Highway. Many locations in California are named after Vasco Núñez de Balboa, including the Balboa Peninsula section of Newport Beach in Orange County and San Diego's Balboa Park. In reality, State Route 1 does not run south of Orange County. In season 1, it is implied that Neptune is about 85 miles (or a 90-minute drive) from San Diego. Series creator Rob Thomas stated in an interview that Neptune is located near San Juan Capistrano in Orange County.

Neptune scenes are generally filmed in San Diego County, and exteriors of all of the show's most notable locations are found there. For example, exteriors of the Mars residence are filmed in Point Loma, and exteriors of Mars Investigations are filmed on Adams Avenue in Normal Heights. Oceanside High School in Oceanside, California, doubles as the fictional Neptune High, and San Diego State University, University of California, San Diego and the University of San Diego are portrayed as the fictional Hearst College. Qualcomm Stadium represents Shark Field, a fictitious stadium in Balboa County that is demolished in the second season.

The (numerically) closest real ZIP Codes to 90909 are 90899, which belongs to Long Beach, California, 91001 which belongs to Altadena, California, and 92009 which belongs to Carlsbad, California. 909xx series ZIP Codes are an unassigned series in the greater Los Angeles zipspace.

=== Politics ===
All aspects of Neptune, including its politics, are controlled by the "09ers". Neptune is the county seat of Balboa, containing the county's main Sheriff's Office (the only one seen) and the County Supervisor's Office. When the series begins, the sheriff is Don Lamb. Lamb is more concerned with the bureaucratic side of his job rather than proper and thorough police work. He gained his office in an emergency recall election, after the ousting of his former boss Keith Mars. Lamb has consistently displayed significant favoritism toward 09ers, such as allowing Jake Kane to avoid having his daughter Lilly's car impounded for unpaid parking tickets.

A county supervisor, informally referred to as the "Mayor" of Neptune, was seen during the season one episode "Silence of the Lamb", but his name was not given. At the start of season two, baseball team owner Woody Goodman ran for and won the position of county supervisor, holding the position until fleeing Neptune after being accused of blowing up the school bus at the start of the season. Besides being eventually exposed as a pedophile child molester, Goodman was murdered by Cassidy "Beaver" Casablancas, the son of a wealthy "09er" family who had been sexually abused by Goodman when he was younger. As of the third season, no word has been given as to how Goodman's death would be handled in terms of naming a successor to the position of "county supervisor".

The second season explored these political elements with plotlines involving an election for the offices of sheriff and county supervisor, with Keith Mars (supported by Goodman) trying to get his old job as sheriff back by running against Don Lamb. While Keith lost his bid to reclaim his old job, Goodman won his election. Afterwards, he showed his ambitious side by launching a campaign to incorporate Neptune, which would lead to the town having an official mayor and its own police department, with the municipal boundaries only including the "09er" sections of town. Those outside this incorporation area came under risk of lower property values and even further reduction in government response and effectiveness. The incorporation would also have gutted the powerbase of Sheriff Lamb, as the local sheriff's office is located outside the "09er" section of the town, effectively leaving Lamb on the outside looking in. This led to much speculation as to why Goodman aligned himself politically with Keith Mars, a plot point that was not explored during the season.

In the end, Goodman's incorporation scheme failed due to a blackmail scheme orchestrated by his former child molestation victim Cassidy Casablancas. With help from his stepmother Kendall Casablancas, Cassidy had purchased a great deal of property outside the incorporation zone at bargain-basement prices (due to the depressed property values brought about due to incorporation talks) and sought to make a profit on them by killing incorporation, driving their prices back up to their original values. Threatening to go public regarding the child molestation charges, Cassidy forced Goodman to manufacture a sex scandal which implicated Keith Mars. Cassidy knew that Keith would fight Goodman to clear his name, and would ensure as a result that the public would think of Goodman as an adulterous politician. This 'backfiring' scandal would then cause Neptune residents to vote against Goodman and incorporation. Following the plan, incorporation lost at the ballot box—though Cassidy would not live to reap the rewards of his scheme for himself, as he committed suicide after Veronica revealed that Cassidy had murdered several of his classmates (along with several innocent bystanders) in order to keep said classmates from exposing Goodman as a pedophile child molester before Cassidy's blackmail/real estate scheme could be carried out.

=== Economy ===
Neptune has a huge gap between the rich "09ers" and those who work for them either directly or through service industry businesses. In Veronica's words, if you are young and live in Neptune, "either your parents are millionaires, or your parents work for millionaires". In the pilot episode and other season one episodes, it was implied that the Mars family existed on the fringes of the "09er" society and that most of their social standing came from Keith Mars's job as sheriff and Veronica's friendship with the children of software mogul Jake Kane.

The largest and most successful business in the community, Kane Software is run and operated by Jake Kane, father of Duncan Kane and Lilly Kane. The company holds the patent on streaming video over the Internet, and according to Veronica is responsible for the huge boom in the local economy. When the patent was approved, many people in the community became rich overnight. Other "09ers" (such as movie star Aaron Echolls and his family) choose to live in Neptune due to its warm climate and its beaches, thus contributing even more to its economy. A few residents have become rich through service businesses (such as the Casablancas family, through real estate) in the boom created by the other "09ers".

== The Mars residence ==
The Mars' apartment building, as shown in the pilot episode, is The Inn at Sunset Cliffs on Point Loma, 1370 Sunset Cliffs Boulevard, in San Diego. This area of Point Loma has a reputation as a beautiful place to watch the sunset and waves crashing below, as well as being a favorite surfing spot.

== Mars Investigations ==
The exterior shot of the building where Veronica's dad's private investigation agency is housed is the Cabrillo Academy of the Sword along 3339 Adams Avenue 92116 in Normal Heights. For reference, the popular Lestat's Coffee House is next to where Mars Investigations would be.

Most of the Mars Investigations office interior scenes were filmed on a set at the Stu Segall lot.

Across the street and on the same block as Mars Investigations is the car wash often seen in Season One flashbacks with Lilly Kane. It is the Adams Avenue Car Wash on Adams Avenue.

== Neptune High ==
Neptune High is a high-school in the fictional seaside city of Neptune, California, attended by Veronica in the first two seasons. The school is divided into two groups, the "09ers" in one group, and everyone else in the other, including the PCH Bike Club. Neptune's main rival is Pan High, who are known to perform pranks on each other every year. The former principal, Alan Moorehead, was exposed to have had an affair with one of his students and have hid the baby that resulted from the affair in the girls' bathroom ("My Mother, the Fiend"). Moorehead was subsequently replaced by Principal Van Clemmons. Mr. Rooks was also found to have had an affair with one of his students, Susan Knight ("Mars vs. Mars"). Ms. Hauser, the health teacher, was caught taking money from the Senior Trip ("Ain’t No Magic Mountain High Enough").

Neptune High also had a policy of "Pirate Points", where students who were involved in certain activities, like sports, student council, and cheerleading, were allowed extra privileges (like getting to have food delivered on-campus). Duncan Kane, upon becoming student council president, restructured the Pirates Points system to allow those in band, the school newspaper, school plays, on the honor roll, or those in vocational trades receive points as well ("Return of the Kane"). Neptune High was also home to a secret society called the Tritons. Those who were chosen to become Tritons had to go through various hazing rituals, such as streaking through the school, performing karaoke, or speaking entirely in pangrams ("Clash of the Tritons").

During the filming of the pilot, producer Paul Kurta said that much of the filming would take place in Oceanside, California. Kurta liked that it was "a seaside town that still feels like middle-class people live there ... Most of the seaside towns feel resort driven." The setting of Neptune High, which was featured in the first two seasons, was also located in Oceanside. The school, Oceanside High School, was paid $7,750 by Stu Segall Productions for the use of the campus and extras.

== Neptune Grand ==
The exterior of the Hilton San Diego with "Neptune Grand" signs. The San Diego convention center can be seen in the distance.

The Neptune Grand is a luxury hotel, mainly catering to the upper class, as opposed to the cheaper Camelot Motel. Lianne Mars told Veronica that Jake Kane was innocent of his daughter's murder because he had been at the Neptune Grand with Lianne at the time of Lilly's death. During the second season, Duncan lived in a suite in the Grand ("Driver Ed"). After a fire in Logan Echolls' house, he moved in with Duncan ("Rat Saw God") and he kept the suite after Duncan ran away to Australia. Logan held the "alterna-prom" in his suite when Neptune High canceled the prom ("Look Who’s Stalking") and also held a graduation party there. Veronica and Beaver's confrontation on the roof of the hotel ended with Beaver jumping to his death ("Not Pictured"). The Neptune Grand is where Aaron Echolls (Logan Echolls' father) was murdered, and the location where Dean O'Dell's wife Mindy had been having an affair with Hank Landry, Veronica's criminology professor. Exterior shots of the Hilton San Diego, Gaslamp Quarter were used for the Neptune Grand in season two. Other shots of the Hyatt Regency were also used.

== Hearst College ==
Hearst College is a fictional Southern California college, attended by Veronica in the third season. The name was chosen in the series' second season when a prominent Californian name was needed, and there was already a Stanford University. Hearst is named after William Randolph Hearst, a newspaper magnate and leading newspaper publisher. Randolph Hearst's granddaughter Patty Hearst, was signed to play Selma Hearst Rose, the granddaughter of the founder of Hearst College. The character was an heiress of Hearst Mart, a chain similar to Wal-Mart.

The setting of Hearst College was mostly filmed on the campuses of San Diego State University, University of San Diego, and the University of California, San Diego. Assistant Location Manager Steven Lee said that the filming locations were chosen by the director and by production designer Alfred Sole. Sole reportedly "really liked the look and feel of the school", and San Diego State University invited the series with "open arms". Taping at the university led to financial and employment benefits for the university and its students. Alumni worked as crewmembers while students worked as actors; half of the third season extras were students from the university's film department.

Hearst College is first mentioned in the second season, when one of Veronica's fellow jurors recommends its generous scholarships and grant programs. ("One Angry Veronica") Later on in the season, Veronica and Wallace go to a "Get to Know Hearst" weekend. During her visit, Veronica discovers that there is a serial date rapist who shaves the heads of his victims. She manages to exonerate her ex-boyfriend Troy, but is not able to figure out who the rapist is. ("The Rapes of Graff") The third season begins with Veronica, Logan, Wallace, Mac, Dick, Piz and Parker as freshmen at Hearst College. Veronica is studying criminology, and is still living at home. Weevil is the maintenance worker at Hearst, and he forms a friendship with Dean Cyrus O'Dell. At the beginning of the semester, Parker is raped by the Hearst serial rapist. ("Welcome Wagon") Feeling guilty for not helping her, Veronica sets herself to catching the rapist. ("My Big Fat Greek Rush Week") Veronica discovers the identity of the rapist, a fellow student, and Dean O'Dell is found dead. ("Spit & Eggs")
Hearst College is also mentioned in the TV Series Moonlight, also starring Jason Dohring, the actor who portrayed Logan Echolls.

Hearst College is mentioned again in Rob Thomas' show "iZombie"; season 2 episode 5 titled "Love & Basketball", when one of the murder suspects bet on a basketball game from Hearst College, where he went to school.

== Cuba ==
In the episode "A Trip to the Dentist" what is supposed to be a location in Cuba (the country) is actually the El Prado area of Balboa Park, where most of the museums are concentrated.

== Strip clubs ==
In a couple of early episodes, strip clubs are seen in stakeouts: the Body Shop and Les Girls, both located next to each other just off Rosecrans Blvd. in the Sports Arena/Midway district.

== Dog Beach/Boardwalk ==
Dog Beach in Ocean Beach appears to have been the location for most of the beach scenes in Veronica Mars. Some other beach scenes were also filmed at La Jolla Shores beach. Some of the Neptune Boardwalk scenes in the first two seasons were shot at Belmont Park in Mission Beach—the Giant Dipper Rollercoaster is the giveaway.

== Other sightings ==
The video store in "Meet John Smith" is Kensington Video on Adams Ave. in Kensington. Scolari's Office in North Park is Fitzpatrick's Bar. Winston's bar in Ocean Beach was used in "Welcome Wagon". Gorey's Market Liquor and parking lot on 36th and University (92104) were used on two scenes in S3 E15 "Papa's Cabin". The gym in "You Think You Know Somebody" is Stern's Gym on Granada Avenue in North Park. Other frequently used locales were Mission Hills, Ocean Beach, Sunset Cliffs, La Jolla, Torrey Pines Golf Course/The Lodge Hotel, Oceanside and Normal Heights, as well as Mission Bay.
