= My Mother, the Fiend =

- Veronica Mars episode
- Episode no.: Season 2 Episode 9
- Directed by: Nick Marck
- Written by: Phil Klemmer; Dayna Lynne North
- Production code: 2T7209
- Original air date: November 30, 2005

Guest appearances
- Alyson Hannigan as Trina Echolls; Alona Tal as Meg Manning; Duane Daniels as Van Clemmons; Tina Majorino as Cindy "Mac" Mackenzie; Lisa Thornhill as Celeste Kane; Kari Coleman as Mrs. Deborah Philipina Hauser; John Bennett Perry as Alan Moorehead; Charisma Carpenter as Kendall Casablancas

Episode chronology
← Previous "Ahoy, Mateys!"	Next → "One Angry Veronica"
- Veronica Mars season 2

"My Mother, the Fiend" is the ninth episode of the second season of the American mystery television series Veronica Mars and the thirty-first episode overall. Directed by Nick Marck, the episode was co-written by Phil Klemmer and Dayna Lynne North. It was first aired on November 30, 2005, on UPN.

The series depicts the adventures of Veronica Mars (Kristen Bell) as she deals with life as a high school student while moonlighting as a private detective. In this episode, Veronica finds her mother's old high school records and starts digging into her mother's past, discovering information about the Kane family in the process. Meanwhile, Beaver (Kyle Gallner) proposes a business plan to help Kendall (Charisma Carpenter).

"My Mother, the Fiend" features the third and final appearance by Alyson Hannigan on the show. The show's crew found it difficult to work an episode into Hannigan's schedule because of other projects. The episode was accompanied by an alternate ending, a publicity move made by executive producer Joel Silver and the UPN promotions department. The episode was initially viewed by 2.82 million viewers and received mostly positive reviews. For example, Rowan Kaiser, of The A.V. Club, wrote "I am intrigued by the decisions to make Veronica less than pure, but this time, I'm not as disappointed by the followthrough."

== Synopsis ==
In health class, the students are assigned to take care of fake babies. Vice-Principal Clemmons (Duane Daniels) calls Veronica into his office and gives her detention for having keys to his file cabinet. Beaver walks up to Mac (Tina Majorino) and asks to hire her to register a company named Phoenix Land Trust and build the company a website. For Veronica's detention, she has to alphabetize and organize old student files. Veronica finds her mother's permanent file and reads that she was frequently in trouble in high school, including being suspended for spreading rumors. While Weevil (Francis Capra) is in the auto shop he is ambushed by Logan (Jason Dohring) and his cronies. Veronica talks to Deborah Hauser, a teacher who was in the same class as Lianne. Mrs. Hauser confirms they were suspended, and that she regrets spreading Lianne's gossip. Weevil gets duct-taped to the flagpole. Veronica asks Vice Principal Clemmons about who else might have known her mom in high school, and he tells her to talk to Principal Moorehead and Mary Mooney. Veronica approaches Mary while she is cleaning up lunch trays, but Mary doesn't respond. A student tells Veronica Mary is deaf. Veronica uses fingerspelling to ask about her mom, who Mary calls a "fiend". Veronica then talks to Principal Moorhead, who tells her that her mom was "vicious". It is announced that Trina Echolls (Alyson Hannigan) is coming back to direct a play at Neptune High. Kendall tries to seduce Duncan (Teddy Dunn) again. Trina meets Kendall, and the interaction is rife with sarcasm. Veronica looks through her mom's yearbook and eventually tracks down Patty Wilson, one of her mother's old friends. Patty provides more information on the love triangle between Celeste (Lisa Thornhill), Jake (Kyle Secor), and Lianne.

Veronica asks Keith (Enrico Colantoni) about Lianne's suspension, which she thinks was punishment for spreading a rumor that Celeste was pregnant. Keith says that he doesn't know anything about it, but agrees to look up birth records for 1980. Trina slips and falls during a play rehearsal, knocking herself out. Beaver meets with Kendall and confronts her about selling his father's possessions for little money. Beaver gives her his plan, which involves her being the face of the Phoenix Land Trust, as Beaver is under 18. Keith's search of the birth records finds that no baby was born to either "Kane" or "Carnathan" (Celeste's maiden name) at that time. However, he finds that a baby was abandoned in the girls' bathroom at the 1980 Neptune High prom. Veronica bad-mouths Celeste in Duncan's suite only for Celeste to walk in, having overheard everything. Veronica learns that Duncan never told his parents about their relationship. Celeste insults Veronica's mother, and Veronica deduces that Celeste's cleaning lady, Astrid, is probably her daughter. Weevil confronts Logan and they argue before Weevil admits that he no longer thinks Logan killed Felix. However, they agree to start fighting in order to keep up appearances when the bell rings.

Mac shows her work to Beaver, and they flirt. Veronica, under a disguise, meets with the prom baby's temporary foster mom. Veronica learns that the baby's adopted mother died by suicide and her adopted father is in jail, hinting that the baby is Trina Echolls. Veronica visits Trina in the hospital and they plot to smoke out Trina's birth mother by telling the tabloids Trina needs a bone marrow transplant. During play rehearsal, Mary Mooney approaches Trina and using sign language explains that she is Trina's mother. Mary explains to Veronica that Lianne was a friend (not a fiend) and that Lianne helped her cover up her pregnancy. It is revealed Trina's father is Principal Moorehead, and Trina confronts him about leaving her at the prom in front of many faculty. Veronica finds the dead rat that Keith picked up at the bus. Veronica deduces that Vice Principal Clemmons deliberately gave Veronica her detention task so that she would find her mother's permanent file and expose Principal Moorehead, leaving Clemmons to be promoted to Principal. Veronica picks up Abel Koontz's (Christian Clemenson) belongings and walks into Meg's (Alona Tal) room where she discovers that Meg is pregnant. After Veronica leaves the room Meg is shown opening her eyes.

== Production ==
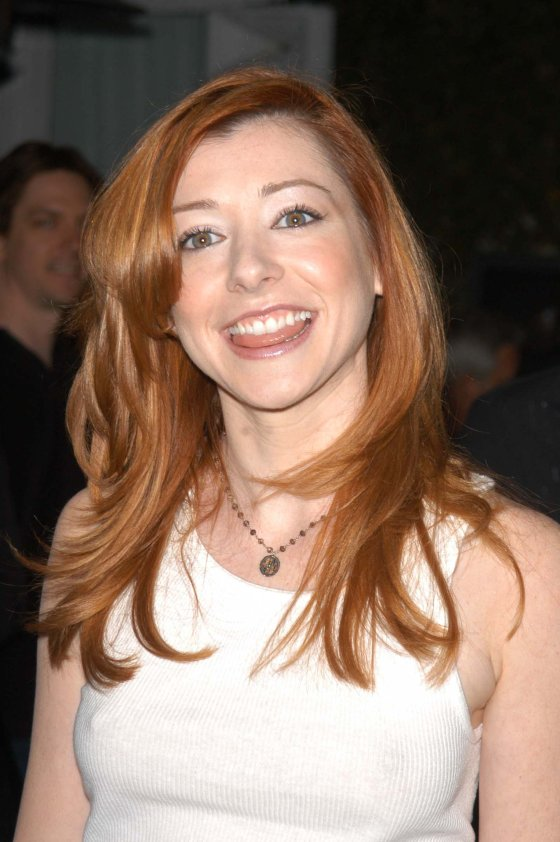
"My Mother, the Fiend" features the final appearance by Alyson Hannigan as Trina Echolls. Thomas said it was difficult trying to write an episode for Hannigan, because of her busy schedule

Directed by Nick Marck, "My Mother, the Fiend" was written by Phil Klemmer and Dayna Lynne North. The episode marks Klemmer's eighth writing credit, the fifth and penultimate writing credit for North, and Marck's seventh directing credit. Despite being credited, Wallace (Percy Daggs III), Dick (Ryan Hansen), and Jackie (Tessa Thompson) do not appear in the episode. Among the episode's guest stars are Alyson Hannigan and Charisma Carpenter, who portray Trina Echolls and Kendall Casablancas, respectively. The two previously starred together in Buffy the Vampire Slayer, with Hannigan playing Willow Rosenberg and Carpenter portraying Cordelia Chase. Although the two characters had appeared previously, they had never shared a scene together. Jason Dohring, who portrays Logan, stated that he had a special connection with Hannigan on-set: "We get together and just tease each other, she sucker-punches me. There's just a total, I don't know, we really have a sister-brother thing going on. I've never had that kind of connection with an actress before. It totally works." Dohring also noted that Hannigan responded strongly to any spoilers that she was given during filming of the episode.

"My Mother, the Fiend" also marks Hannigan's third and final guest appearance on the show. Hannigan was open to appearing in another episode, but she was unsure whether or not her busy schedule would allow it. She also felt that the character's arc had come to a natural close in this episode. In an interview, Rob Thomas said that due to her busy schedule, it was difficult to write an episode featuring Hannigan. On Hannigan's role in the episode and her future availability, Thomas commented:

Well, to work around Alyson's schedule is really difficult for us. It's hard to plan to write an episode with Alyson in it because we don't know exactly what her free days are. Even the episode that we did with her, there was a huge kerfuffle, we actually had to slide that story line one episode down from when we originally wrote that. We've loved having Alyson in the show, and I'm sure we will again, some day, if she's willing, because we've had a lot of fun with her. But we have nothing booked with her right now.

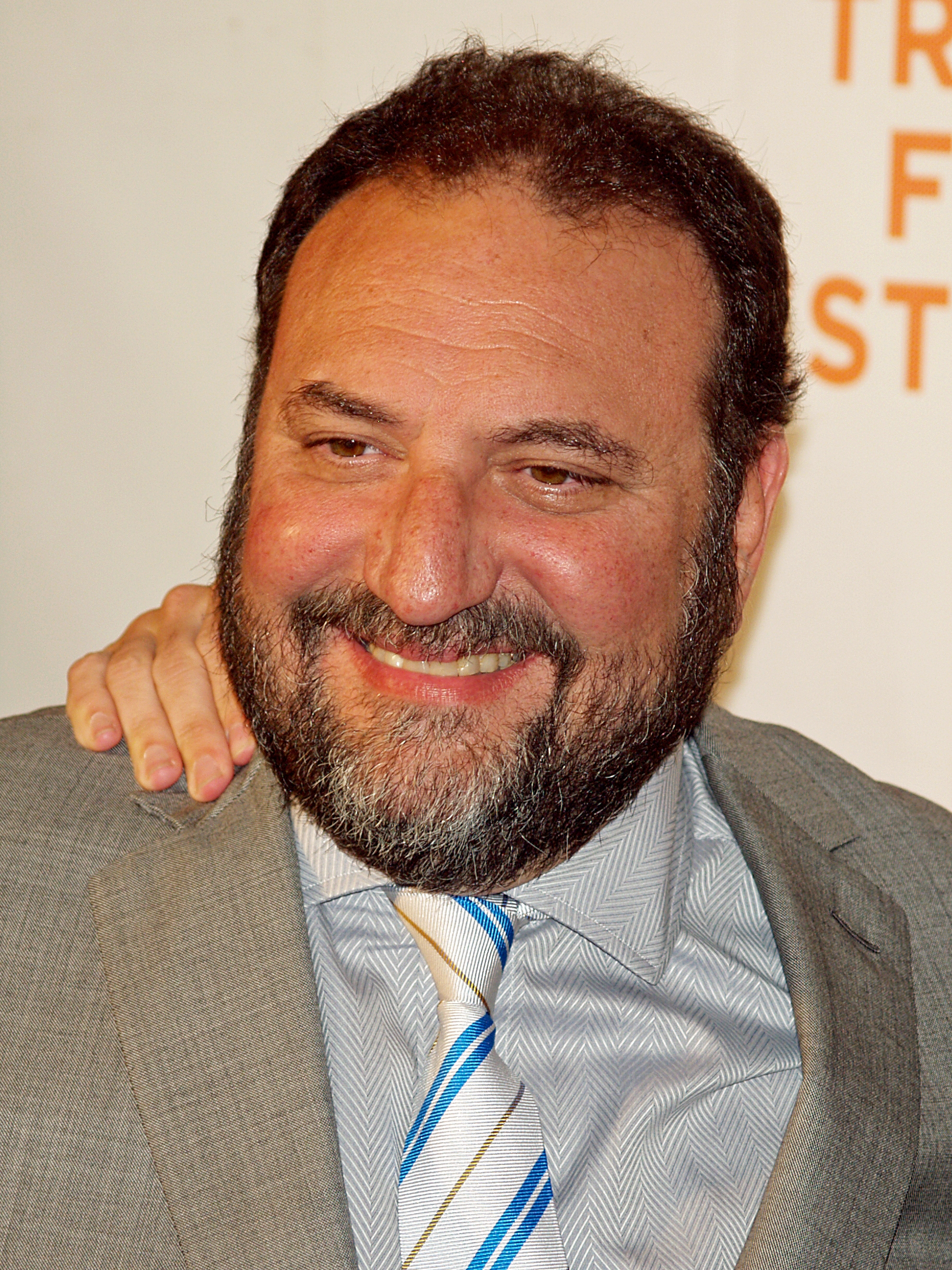
Joel Silver wanted to promote the alternate ending for the episode.

The episode also features a reappearance by Celeste Kane (Lisa Thornhill), a recurring character during the first season. The second season DVD includes an alternate ending to this episode, which was released around the airing of the episode as a promotional tool. The alternate ending starts the same way as the regular ending, with Veronica discovering that Meg is pregnant. But instead of the episode ending there, Meg's mom comes into the room while Veronica hides in the bathroom. When the mom leaves, Meg is dead with a pillow over her face, indicating smothering. However, Veronica takes the pillow off before a nurse comes in. Thomas commented that the alternate ending was never going to be the actual conclusion to the episode. He said: "We never seriously considered having that be the ending. There were various other endings that we did have, but they were so subtly different, it was like, 'When does Veronica enter the room?'" The idea to promote the alternate ending was a joint venture from the UPN promotions department and executive producer Joel Silver. After Thomas learned that others wanted an alternate ending, he decided to make it very different from the episode's actual conclusion. "But once we could have a [very different] alternate ending, we thought, 'Let's make it rock.' The beauty of having that alternate ending is that we don't have to play it out in the next episode."

== Reception ==
=== Ratings ===
In its original broadcast, "My Mother, the Fiend" received 2.82 million viewers, marking an increase from "Ahoy, Mateys!" and ranking 101st (out of 112) in the weekly rankings.

=== Reviews ===
The episode received mostly positive reviews. Price Peterson, of TV.com, gave the episode a positive review, writing that he "[l]oved this episode. That reveal was simultaneously shocking and heartbreaking. Plus it took one of the show's most annoying characters (Trina) and made her both sympathetic and heartbreaking." He also praised the information found on Veronica's mother: "It was nice that Veronica got to see a better side of her mother than we usually do…Heartwarming!" Maureen Ryan, of the Chicago Tribune, called the episode "engrossing" and that it is a better use of a viewer's time than Lost, which aired at the same time as Veronica Mars.

Rowan Kaiser, of The A.V. Club, lauded Veronica's characterization as an antiheroine in the episode. "I've discussed times when [Veronica has] behaved in ways that I'm not certain are ethical, but this might be the most blatant case. […] Once again, I am intrigued by the decisions to make Veronica less than pure, but this time, I'm not as disappointed by the followthrough." Television Without Pity gave the episode a "B". Alan Sepinwall singled out the scene between Carpenter and Hannigan and the Weevil and Logan subplot as particular points of praise. Sepinwall also called the alternate ending "an interesting little feature" while going on to state that he was "glad the real show didn't go in that direction."

BuzzFeed ranked the episode 48th on its ranking of Veronica Mars episodes, writing that it made the viewer "bored." On a similar list, TVLine ranked the episode 19th.
