= Normal Is the Watchword =

- Veronica Mars episode
- Episode no.: Season 2 Episode 1
- Directed by: John Kretchmer
- Written by: Rob Thomas
- Production code: 2T7201
- Original air date: September 28, 2005

Guest appearances
- Jeffrey Sams as Terrence Cook; Alona Tal as Meg Manning; Max Greenfield as Leo D'Amato; Charles Duckworth as Kelvin Moore; Krysten Ritter as Gia Goodman; Charisma Carpenter as Kendall Casablancas; Steve Guttenberg as Woody Goodman

Episode chronology
← Previous "Leave It to Beaver"	Next → "Driver Ed"
- Veronica Mars season 2

"Normal Is the Watchword" is the season premiere of the second season of the American mystery television series Veronica Mars, and the twenty-third episode overall. Written by series creator Rob Thomas and directed by John Kretchmer, the episode premiered on UPN on September 28, 2005.

The series depicts the adventures of Veronica Mars (Kristen Bell) as she deals with life as a high school student while moonlighting as a private detective. In this episode, Veronica reveals the events that transpired over the summer after the resolution of the murder of Lilly Kane (Amanda Seyfried). Meanwhile, Veronica investigates a scam involving students' forged drug tests, and a school bus mysteriously goes off a cliff.

"Normal Is the Watchword" featured several casting changes to the show, including the introduction of Kendall (Charisma Carpenter) and Gia (Krysten Ritter), as well as the promotion of three actors to series regular status. The episode received mostly positive reviews, and Thomas was nominated for a Writers Guild of America Award for his writing.

== Synopsis ==
One day before senior year, Veronica is working a job at a restaurant. Soon, a boy named Kelvin (Charles Duckworth) comes into the restaurant and says that he failed his drug test, even though he has been clean for ten months. Veronica sees an interview with her father, Keith (Enrico Colantoni), on TV, and it is revealed that he wrote a book about the Lilly Kane case. The episode then flashes back to the romantic cliffhanger at the end of season one, and it is revealed that Logan was at the door. Logan reveals that the biker gang beat him up after he kicked Weevil (Francis Capra) in the face. Although he woke up with a knife and found one of the gang members was stabbed, Logan tells Veronica that he did not stab the gang member, and Veronica believes him. However, Leo (Max Greenfield) comes and arrests Logan. Wallace (Percy Daggs III) says that he and Meg (Alona Tal) also failed their drug test. Wallace informs Veronica about the details of the drug test, and the episode flashes back to show the details of Veronica and Logan starting to date over the summer. Veronica talks to all the students who were framed in the drug test, and they all say some people might want to harm them. Veronica has become estranged from Meg, and Veronica reveals that Logan was released from prison soon after he was arrested.

Veronica connects the five people who were framed to an incident where a student was publicly harassed in gym class. Keith is still dating Alicia Fennel (Erica Gimpel). Veronica and Wallace spend the night investigating students, and Veronica eventually deduces that Wallace ingested a small amount of an illegal substance, most likely in a gift basket earlier that year. In a flashback, Veronica and Logan make out in the car until the PCH bikers shoot out the car's windows. Veronica conducts a drug test on Wallace and finds that he's clean, which rules out the possibility that his food was spiked.

Veronica asks Keith for help in finding out the names of a company's shareholders, and discovers that the parents of the second-string athletes who have been promoted to starting positions as a result of the failed drug tests are all shareholders in the trading company. Veronica believes that one of the lab assistants was paid off to forge the results. The previous summer, Logan was involved with an arson crime. Logan sunbathes with Dick (Ryan Hansen) and Beaver (Kyle Gallner) poolside, and they ogle the brothers' stepmother, Kendall Casablancas (Charisma Carpenter). Veronica sets up the parents and has Principal Clemmons listen in, and it is revealed that Duncan is now dating Veronica. In a flashback, Veronica breaks up with Logan. When Logan starts to get angry, Keith barges in and makes him leave. Logan is carrying on a relationship with Kendall.

On a field trip, Veronica meets Gia (Krysten Ritter). Dick arranges a limo ride home for the O-niners, but Veronica and Meg decline and take the school bus. During the ride home, Veronica talks to Meg one more time, but she is still passive-aggressive. Veronica explains to the audience that she and Duncan are dating. At a rest stop, Veronica sees Weevil and they debate about the stabbed gang member. Meanwhile, Veronica's bus drives away without her. Instead, Weevil takes Veronica on his motorcycle before they run across the limo with Duncan, Gia, and the other O-niners in it. They tell Veronica that the field trip bus full of students drove off the cliff and into the sea, and they look over at the crashed bus.

== Production ==
When it was renewed for a second season, Veronica Mars became the lowest-rated show in network history to be renewed and the only UPN drama from the 2004-05 television season to be renewed. Starting in the second season, Veronica Mars was moved to Wednesday nights, placing it in direct competition with ABC's popular Lost. Rob Thomas said that, "I wish the juggernaut that is Lost wasn't our direct competition." At the same time, Veronica Mars was placed after UPN's America's Next Top Model. On the date of the airing of this episode, Bell and Thomas talked to The New York Times, where Thomas commented, "We let Veronica say things that, if you get all day to think about it, would be the perfect retort."

The episode was originally titled "Urine Trouble", a joking pun on "You're in trouble." The episode's title refers to a phrase said by both Veronica and Wallace, indicating that things are supposedly "normal," though they are not. The episode was written by series creator Rob Thomas and directed by John T. Kretchmer. This episode marks Thomas's fourth writing credit for the series (after "Pilot", "Credit Where Credit's Due", and "Leave It to Beaver") and Kretchmer's fourth directing credit for the series. In the episode, Logan mentions that producers wanted Tara Reid to play Trina Echolls (Alyson Hannigan) in casting for the film adaptation of the Echolls' story. During casting of the role of Trina, Reid was actually almost cast in the part.

In the episode, Logan makes an obscene hand gesture known as the shocker, something that the UPN censors did not notice. Before the filming of "Normal Is the Watchword", Rob Thomas informed actor Teddy Dunn, who played Duncan Kane, that he was planning to remove the character from the show. Dunn has said that he was not too upset by the news, as he almost did not return for the season at all. On his role in the season, Dunn stated, "And so I knew going in that I had a finite amount of episodes, so it was like any other job. It was week-to-week and then I went on my merry way."

The episode features a brief cameo by Julie Chen, wife of UPN executive Leslie Moonves. The cast members did not know important plot information before they received the script for the episode, including who was at Veronica's door and that Veronica and Duncan would resume dating. "Ashes" by Embrace plays during the bus crash scene.

=== Casting ===
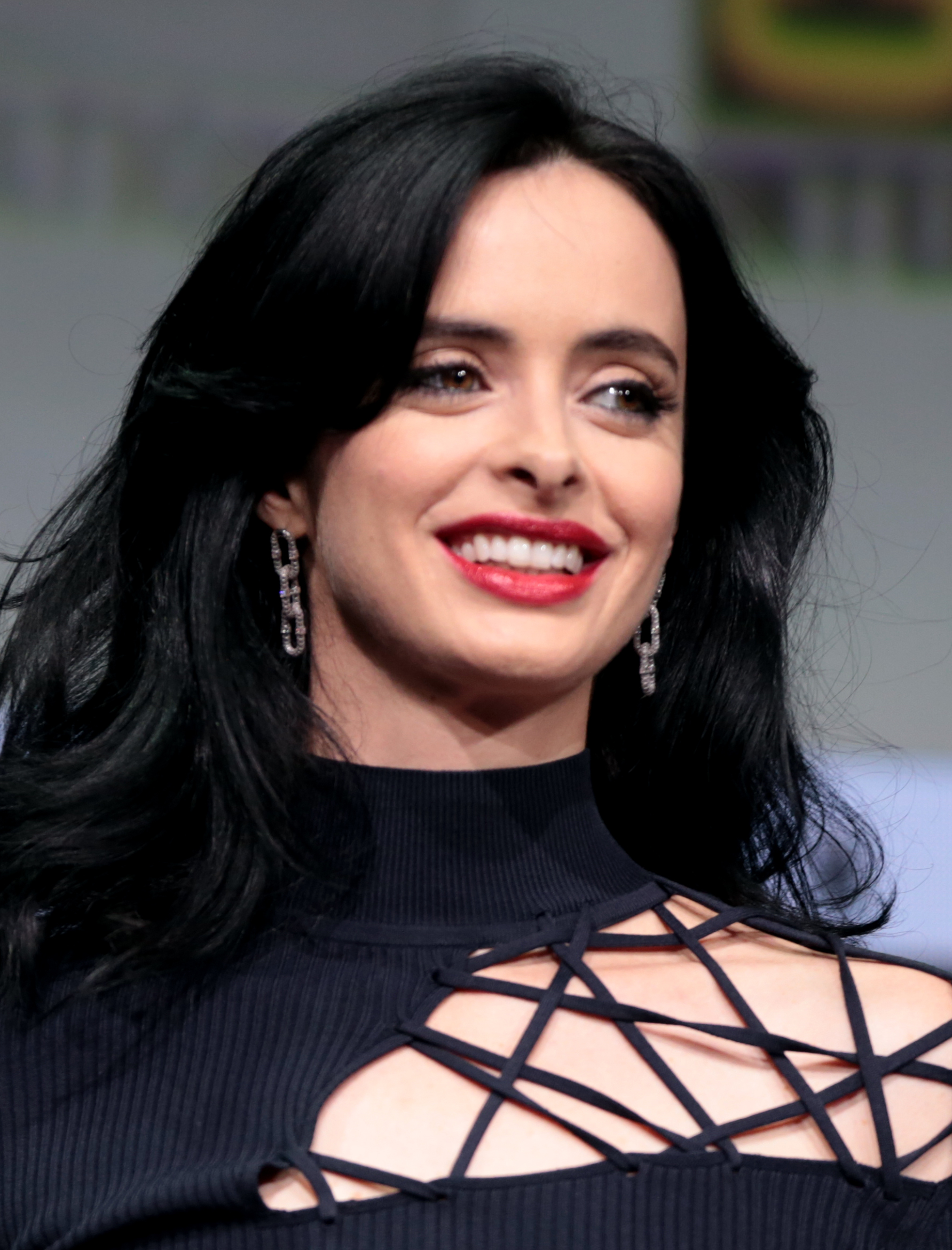
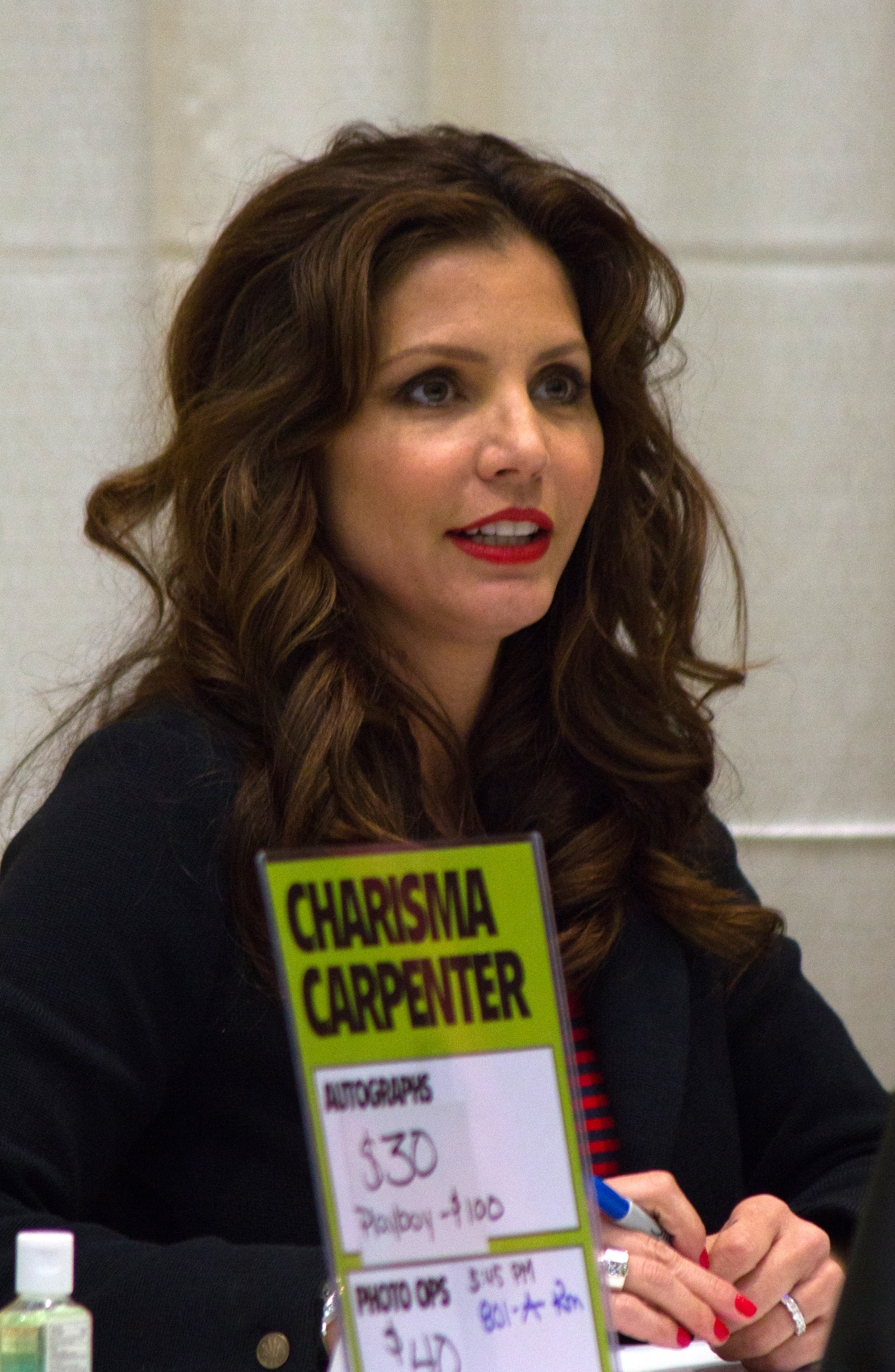
"Normal Is the Watchword" introduces several new characters to the show, including Gia Goodman (Krysten Ritter, left) and Kendall Casablancas (Charisma Carpenter, right).

"Normal Is the Watchword" introduces several new characters and series regulars to the show. On casting the new season, Thomas explained that he "conceive[d] the show as a one-year mystery" and decided that he needed to introduce and eliminate several characters to be able to create an "equally fascinating mystery" for the series' second season. Thomas felt that he could not bring back the Kanes and the Echolls and "have them all involved in a new mystery"; he needed "new blood". In the opening credits, three new actors are given star billing. Two of these actors, Ryan Hansen as Dick Casablancas and Kyle Gallner as Cassidy "Beaver" Casablancas, served as recurring characters in the show's first season. In addition, this episode marks the first credit of Jackie Cook, played by Tessa Thompson, despite the fact that she does not appear in the episode.

Several important recurring characters of the show's second season are also introduced in "Normal Is the Watchword." Kendall Casablancas, portrayed by Charisma Carpenter, best known for her role as Cordelia Chase on Buffy the Vampire Slayer and Angel makes her first appearance in the episode. During casting, Heather Graham was considered for the role. However, Graham was filming Emily's Reasons Why Not. Carpenter said that she wanted to play the role because "the name is really spectacular." The episode also introduces the character of Gia Goodman, played by Krysten Ritter, who would later become known for her roles in Breaking Bad, Don't Trust the B— in Apartment 23, and Jessica Jones. Ritter would reprise her role in the film continuation of Veronica Mars and called her role on the series "her first big acting job." Ritter was a fan of Veronica Mars before her role on the show, and she unsuccessfully auditioned for a guest role in the first season. However, the producers enjoyed Ritter's performance, so they told her that she "would be on the show at some point."

== Reception ==
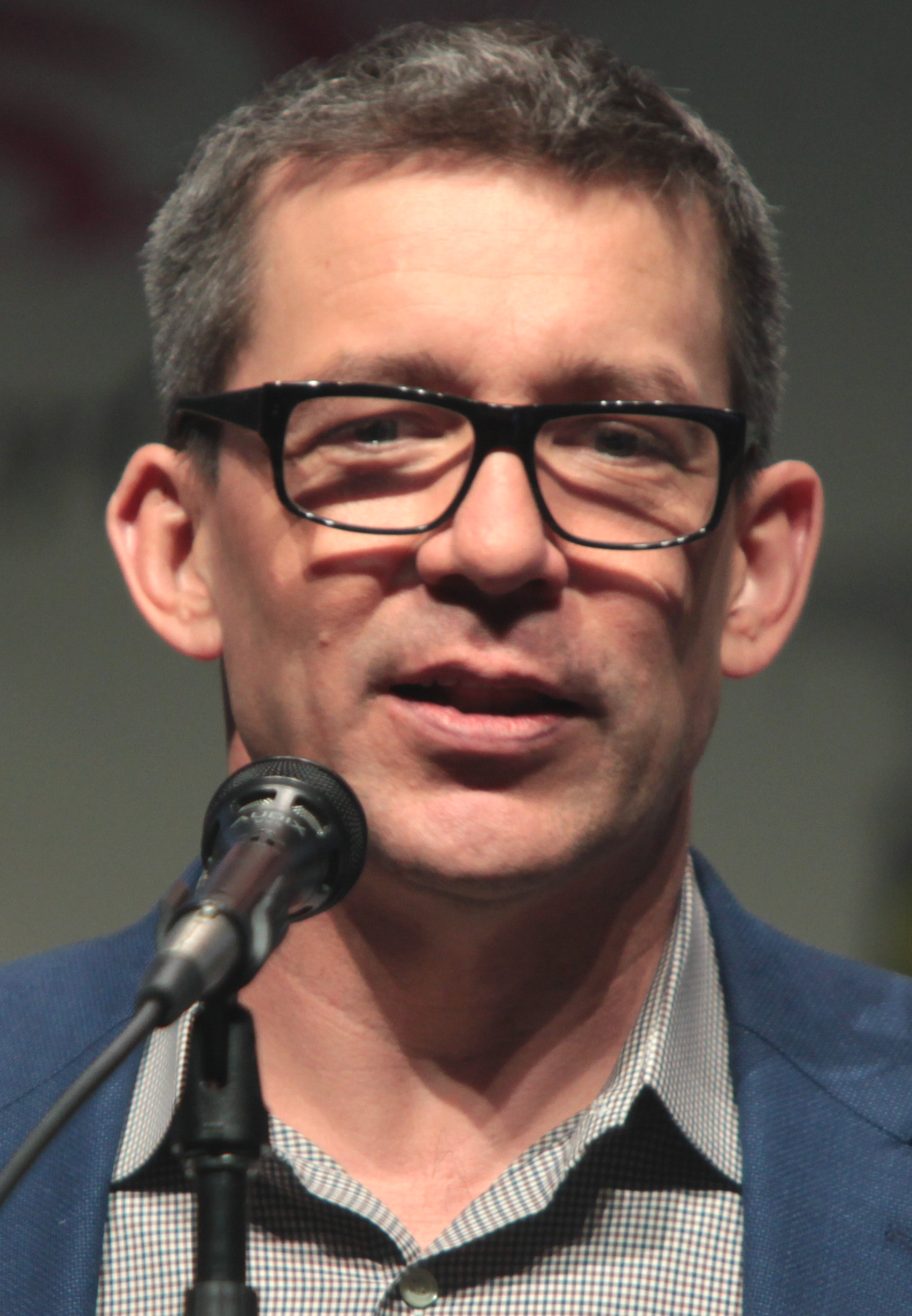
Series creator Rob Thomas wrote the episode and received a Writers Guild of America Award nomination for his work.

=== Ratings ===
In its original broadcast, "Normal Is the Watchword" garnered 3.29 million viewers and ranked 97th out of 112 in the weekly rankings. This was an increase over both the previous season's finale, "Leave It to Beaver", which received 2.99 million viewers, and the previous season premiere (the pilot episode), which garnered 2.49 million viewers. At the time, the episode was the highest-rated episode of Veronica Mars in the show's history. However, this ratings high would be surpassed by "One Angry Veronica".

=== Reviews ===
The episode received positive reviews. Rowan Kaiser, writing for The A.V. Club, gave a glowing review, saying that it had all the components that a season premiere should have. After praising many aspects of the episode, the reviewer wrote, "What ties it all together, though, is a storytelling form that indicates complete confidence from the show about what its viewers can deal with. It's half present-day, half-flashback. But the two different halves, combined with Veronica's voiceover, combine to present the information in pleasantly deceptive fashion."

Price Peterson of TV.com also gave a positive review, writing in his episode verdict that "It's frankly amazing how much information this episode packed into 42 minutes while still feeling breezy and funny…The episode also ended with that breathtakingly horrifying ending, a multiple-death shocker that served to remind me just how murder-lite Season 1 was." Television Without Pity gave the episode a "B+". Alan Sepinwall wrote that the season premiere was "a little heavy on the exposition" while also commenting that the same could be said about the pilot episode. Sepinwall went on to state, "I'm really enjoying all the new storylines and characters."

Cynthia Fuchs of PopMatters, gave a positive review, noting the various new storylines and how the characters, especially Veronica, handled this new set of events. "Like most adolescents, Veronica understands and anticipates this mix, even if she doesn't always deal with it in the most effective way. Even if you don't want to pick sides, you're bound to be assessed as having done so. And once you're labeled—09er or not—you can either spend your time fighting rumors or finding alternative measures. Veronica, so precociously and brilliantly aware of alternatives, makes this familiar process seem worth pondering one more time."

BuzzFeed ranked the episode 23rd on its ranking of Veronica Mars episodes, writing "take a close look at this episode; all the answers are right there." On a similar list, TVLine ranked the episode 18th, writing that it was notable for its introduction of characters and the bus crash plot line.

=== Accolades ===
For his work on the episode, Rob Thomas received a Writers Guild of America Award nomination for Best Episodic Drama. However, Thomas lost at the Writers Guild of America Awards 2005 to Lawrence Kaplow for the House episode "Autopsy".
