= Veronica Mars =

American teen mystery drama TV series (2004–2007, 2019)

- Genre: Mystery; Neo-noir; Teen drama
- Created by: Rob Thomas
- Starring: Kristen Bell; Percy Daggs III; Teddy Dunn; Jason Dohring; Sydney Tamiia Poitier; Francis Capra; Enrico Colantoni; Ryan Hansen; Kyle Gallner; Tessa Thompson; Julie Gonzalo; Chris Lowell; Tina Majorino; Michael Muhney
- Narrated by: Kristen Bell
- Opening theme: "We Used to Be Friends" by The Dandy Warhols
- Composer: Josh Kramon
- Country of origin: United States
- Original language: English
- No. of seasons: 4
- No. of episodes: 72 (list of episodes)

Production
- Executive producers: Joel Silver; Rob Thomas; Diane Ruggiero; Jennifer Gwartz; Danielle Stokdyk; Kristen Bell
- Production location: California
- Running time: 42 minutes (seasons 1–3); 48–54 minutes (season 4)
- Production companies: Stu Segall Productions; Silver Pictures Television (seasons 1–3); Rob Thomas Productions (seasons 1–3); Spondoolie Productions (season 4); Warner Bros. Television

Original release
- Network: UPN
- Release: September 22, 2004 – May 9, 2006
- Network: The CW
- Release: October 3, 2006 – May 22, 2007
- Network: Hulu
- Release: July 19, 2019

Related
- Veronica Mars (film)

Veronica Mars is an American teen mystery television series created by screenwriter Rob Thomas. The neo-noir series is set in the fictional town of Neptune, California, and stars Kristen Bell as the eponymous character. It premiered on September 22, 2004, during television network UPN's final two years, and ended on May 22, 2007, after a season on UPN's successor, The CW, airing for three seasons total. Veronica Mars was produced by Warner Bros. Television, Silver Pictures Television, Stu Segall Productions, and Rob Thomas Productions. Joel Silver and Thomas were executive producers for the entire run of the series, while Diane Ruggiero was promoted in the third season.

The character Veronica Mars is a student who progresses from high school to college while moonlighting as a private investigator under the tutelage of her detective father. In each episode, Veronica solves a different stand-alone case while working to solve a more complex mystery. The first two seasons of the series each had a season-long mystery arc, introduced in the first episode of the season and solved in the season finale. The third season took a different format, focusing on smaller mystery arcs that would last several episodes.

Thomas initially wrote Veronica Mars as a young adult novel, which featured a male protagonist; he changed this because he thought a noir piece told from a female point of view would be more interesting and original. Filming began in March 2004, and the series premiered in September to 2.49 million American viewers. The critically acclaimed first season's run of 22 episodes garnered an average of 2.5 million viewers per episode in the United States. The series appeared on several fall television best lists and garnered awards and nominations. During the series' run, it was nominated for two Satellite Awards, four Saturn Awards, five Teen Choice Awards and was featured on AFI's TV Programs of the Year for 2005.

The show was cancelled after its third season, and Thomas wrote a feature film script continuing the series. Warner Bros. opted not to fund the project at the time. On March 13, 2013, Bell and Thomas launched a fundraising campaign to produce the film through Kickstarter and attained the $2 million goal in less than 11 hours. They accumulated over $5.7 million on Kickstarter. The film was released on March 14, 2014. An eight-episode fourth season was released on July 19, 2019, on Hulu. In November 2019, it was announced that there were no plans for Hulu to order a fifth season.

== Series overview ==
Season	Episodes	Originally released		
Season	Episodes	First released	Last released	Network
1	22	September 22, 2004	May 10, 2005	UPN
2	22	September 28, 2005	May 9, 2006	UPN
3	20	October 3, 2006	May 22, 2007	The CW
Film		March 14, 2014		—N/a
4	8	July 19, 2019		Hulu

=== Season 1 ===
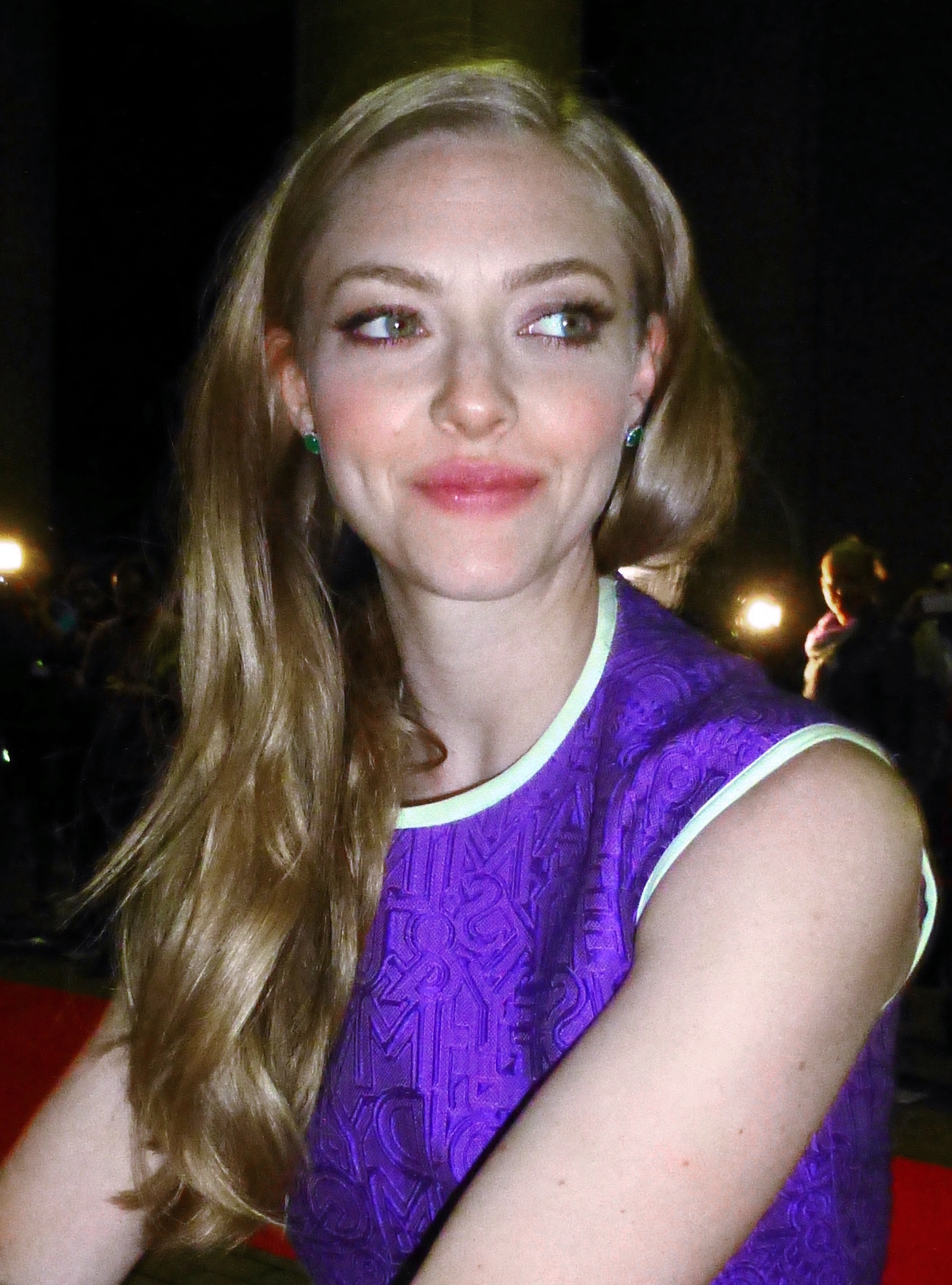
Thomas felt that Amanda Seyfried was so good in the series as Lilly Kane that he used her three or four more times than he initially planned in the first season.

Season 1 revolves around Veronica Mars, a high school student and private investigator in the fictional Southern California seaside town of Neptune. As the daughter of well-respected County Sheriff Keith Mars, Veronica's biggest life problem was getting dumped by her boyfriend, Duncan Kane, until the murder of her best friend, Lilly Kane. After Lilly's murder, Veronica's life falls apart. Keith mistakenly accuses Lilly's father, popular software billionaire Jake Kane, of involvement. When Mr. Kane is proven to be innocent, he has Keith ousted as sheriff in a recall election; Keith is replaced by the corrupt Don Lamb. Veronica's mother, Lianne, develops a drinking problem and leaves town, never to return. Veronica's "09er" friends—wealthy students from the fictional 90909 ZIP Code—demand that she choose between them and her father; Veronica chooses her father. After losing the election for sheriff and being ostracized by the entire community, Keith opens a private investigation agency, Mars Investigations, where Veronica works part-time. Veronica helps her father solve cases and conducts her own investigations on behalf of schoolmates.

Veronica discovers evidence suggesting that Abel Koontz, the man imprisoned after confessing to Lilly's murder, is innocent. Veronica explores the murder case. She also works on other investigations, seeks her estranged mother's whereabouts, and copes with being raped during an 09er party after her drink was spiked. Veronica, no longer part of the school's wealthy and elite "in-crowd," makes some new friends: Wallace Fennel, Neptune High basketball star and new student; Eli "Weevil" Navarro, leader of the PCHers, a Latino biker gang; and Cindy "Mac" Mackenzie, Neptune High's resident computer genius. Using her friends' resources and those provided by her father and his contacts, Veronica gains a reputation for sleuthing and finds her skills in increasingly high demand at her school and in the community. Things get more complicated when Veronica falls into a relationship with Lilly's ex-boyfriend Logan Echolls, who for a time held Veronica partly responsible for Lilly's death and went out of his way to harass her. It is eventually revealed that Lilly was killed by Aaron Echolls, Logan's father.

=== Season 2 ===
The second season begins with introducing two new cases: a bus accident that kills several of Veronica's classmates and the death of PCH gang member Felix Toombs. A school bus carrying six Neptune High students and a teacher plunges off a cliff, killing all but one passenger. Veronica, who was supposed to be on the bus, makes it her mission to discover why the bus crashed and who is responsible. Logan picks a fight with Weevil and the PCHers and ends up accused of killing Felix (a charge he denies). Through the season, Weevil becomes convinced of Logan's innocence, and they team up to find the real killer. This season shows Veronica's life returning to much the way it had been before Lilly's death: having broken up with Logan during the summer, she reunites with Duncan and is somewhat accepted by the 09ers. Her sleuthing sideline and tough persona keep her from fully assimilating into the wealthy crowd. 09ers Dick Casablancas and Cassidy "Beaver" Casablancas deal with a gold-digging stepmother, Kendall Casablancas, with whom they are left when their father flees the country while under investigation for real estate fraud. Wallace discovers that his biological father is alive and takes a romantic interest in Jackie Cook, the daughter of baseball legend Terrence Cook who is investigated for the bus accident. Veronica discovers that the town mayor, who years ago coached a little league baseball team, sexually molested several team members, including Cassidy. In the finale, it is discovered that Cassidy is responsible for the bus accident and Veronica's rape, as well as a plane crash that kills the mayor (Veronica's dad was supposed to be on the plane, so she thinks he is dead). Veronica confronts Cassidy on the roof of the Neptune Grand hotel, where he tries to kill her. Logan saves her, but Cassidy dies by suicide.

=== Season 3 ===
Veronica, Logan, Wallace, Mac, and Dick are freshmen at Neptune's Hearst College in the third season. Two new regular main characters are introduced: Stosh "Piz" Piznarski and Parker Lee, Wallace and Mac's respective roommates. The first mystery is established when Parker becomes a victim of the Hearst serial rapist, a storyline carried over from the second season. Feeling guilty for not helping her and remembering her rape, Veronica works to catch the rapist. The next mystery, the murder of the college's Dean, commences in the same episode that the rapist is caught. Keith begins an adulterous affair with a married client, Wallace struggles to balance academics and sports, Mac begins dating again after previous failed relationships, and Dick has a breakdown and appeals to Logan for help. The season chronicles Veronica and Logan's failing attempts to maintain their relationship in the face of Veronica's increasing mistrust.

=== Season 4 ===
The fourth season opens in 2019, twelve years after the series finale and five following the film. Veronica is living with Logan in Neptune and still solving mysteries with Keith. A significant case arises when several spring break locations are bombed, with suspects including a Congressman, a pizza delivery man, and Big Dick Casablancas.

== Cast and characters ==
The main characters of the third season from left to right: Weevil, Parker, Wallace, Piz, Veronica, Keith, Logan, Dick, Mac and Don.

The first season had seven regular characters. Kristen Bell portrayed the title character Veronica Mars, a high school junior and skilled private detective. Teddy Dunn played Duncan Kane, Veronica's ex-boyfriend and Lilly's brother. Jason Dohring played Logan Echolls, the "bad-boy" 09er, the son of an A-list actor. Percy Daggs III portrayed Wallace Fennel, Veronica's best friend and frequent partner in solving mysteries. Francis Capra portrayed Eli "Weevil" Navarro, the leader of the PCH Biker gang and Veronica's friend. Enrico Colantoni played Veronica's father Keith Mars, a private investigator and former Balboa County Sheriff. Sydney Tamiia Poitier played Mallory Dent, Veronica's journalism teacher at Neptune High. Although she was given series regular billing, Poitier appeared in only four episodes, but was given credit for seven. Poitier's removal from the series was rumored to be due to budget issues.

Thomas, who said he "conceive[d] the show as a one-year mystery," decided that he needed to introduce and eliminate several characters to be able to create an "equally fascinating mystery" for the series' second season. Thomas felt that he could not bring back the Kanes and the Echolls and "have them all involved in a new mystery"; he needed "new blood". The second season saw the introduction of Tessa Thompson as Jackie Cook, a romantic interest of Wallace and daughter of a famous baseball player. Previous recurring characters Dick Casablancas and Cassidy "Beaver" Casablancas were upgraded to series regulars. Dick, played by Ryan Hansen, was an 09er friend of Logan, a womanizer and former high-school bully turned frat boy. Kyle Gallner portrayed "Beaver," Dick's introverted younger brother. Dunn left the series midway through the season, although was credited as a main cast member throughout that season. Thomas explained that the Logan-Veronica-Duncan love triangle had run its course, and to keep the series fresh, there would need to be "other guys in her life." He attributed Dunn's removal to fan interest dominating the Logan-Veronica relationship, saying "it became clear that one suitor won out".

The third season introduced two new series regulars, Parker Lee and Stosh "Piz" Piznarski. Julie Gonzalo portrayed Parker, Mac's extroverted roommate and "everything that Mac is not." Piz, played by Chris Lowell, was Wallace's roommate and a music lover with his campus radio show. Piz was named after the director of the pilot, Mark Piznarski. The character gave Veronica another middle-class male friend. Thomas used the radio show as a narrative device to capture the mood of the university. Cindy "Mac" Mackenzie and Don Lamb, recurring characters in the first two seasons, were upgraded to series regulars. Mac, portrayed by Tina Majorino, was a computer expert befriended by Veronica. Lamb, portrayed by Michael Muhney, was the Balboa County Sheriff who won the office from Keith in the recall election.

== Production ==
=== Conception ===
Rob Thomas originally wrote Veronica Mars as a young adult novel for publishing company Simon & Schuster. Before his first television job on Dawson's Creek, Thomas sold two novel ideas. One of these was provisionally titled Untitled Rob Thomas Teen Detective Novel, which formed the series's basis. The novel had many elements similar to Veronica Mars, though the protagonist was male. Thomas's father was a vice-principal at Westlake High School near Austin, Texas, and the main character attended a "thinly disguised version" of the school. As Thomas had begun writing for film and television, he did not resume his teen detective idea for several years. Writing a novel could take months for Thomas, whereas a television script only took several weeks. Knowing that television scripts paid more, Thomas wrote the teen detective project's television version as a spec script before it became a novel. Since no studio or network had asked him to write it, and he would not get paid unless it sold, Thomas said that "it was never a very pressing project for me." Tinkering with it from time to time, Thomas wrote project notes a year before writing the television script. Most of his original ideas made it into the script, but some changed drastically. Thomas wanted to use flashbacks, and he had to shorten the timeline so that the murder could happen in a recent time. Thomas changed the gender of the protagonist because he thought a noir piece told from a female point of view would be more interesting and unique.

=== Casting ===
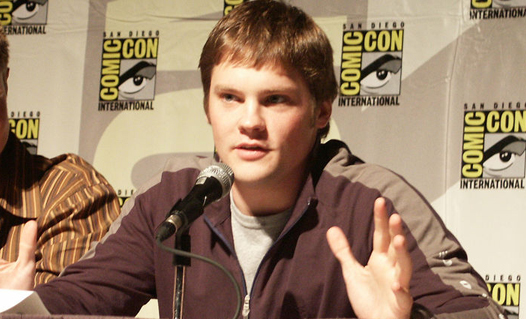
Teddy Dunn, who portrayed Duncan Kane, originally auditioned for the role of Logan Echolls.

Kristen Bell was chosen to play Veronica Mars from more than 500 women who auditioned for the role. Bell felt that it was "just luck" that Rob Thomas saw that "I have some sass to me, and that's exactly what he wanted." Bell thought that her cheerleader looks and an outsider's attitude set her apart from the other women who auditioned.

Jason Dohring, who played Logan, originally auditioned for the role of Duncan. Teddy Dunn originally auditioned for Logan, but ended up portraying Duncan. Dohring felt that his audition for Duncan "was a little dark", and he was told by the producers that it was "not really right". The producers asked Dohring to read for the role of Logan. Dohring acted one scene from the pilot, in which he shattered the headlights of a car with a crowbar. During the final auditions, Dohring read twice with Bell and met with the studio and the network. When reading with Bell, Dohring acted the whole scene as if he had raped her and tried to give the character an evil and fun feel. At the time of Dohring's audition for Logan, the character was only going to be a guest star in the pilot.

Percy Daggs III auditioned for Wallace Fennel's role twice and took three tests with studio and network executives. During his first audition, Daggs read four scenes from the pilot. Just before his studio test, Daggs read with Bell and had "a great conversation." He said that she "made me feel comfortable about auditioning" and was a big reason why he became more comfortable playing Wallace as the season went on.

Thomas described Amanda Seyfried, who portrayed the murdered Lilly Kane, as "the biggest surprise of the year." When casting a series regular, he was able to see all the best actors in town, mainly because they all wanted to be a series regular. When casting Lilly Kane, who would only appear from time-to-time as "the dead girl," Thomas did not receive the same level of actors. Thomas said that he had "never had a more cut and dried audition" than he did with Seyfried. He said that she was "about 100 times better than anyone else that we saw; she was just spectacular". He continued by saying that she ended up being so good in the series that he used her three or four more times than he initially planned.

=== Writing and format ===
"To service a 22-episode mystery, you have to have a large playing field. To service a 9-episode mystery, we can keep that tighter, more focused. Instead of having 12 people who can be in the running for the villain, there might be five in one of those mysteries. I think it will be much cleaner. I think it will also give a new audience more jumping-in points."
— Series creator Rob Thomas on the change of format for the third season.

Episodes have a distinct structure: Veronica investigates a different "case of the week" while trying to solve a larger mystery that spans several episodes or a whole season. The first two seasons of Veronica Mars have a season-long mystery arc, which is introduced in the first episode of the season and solved in the finale. The third season takes on a different format, focusing on two smaller mystery arcs that last the course of nine and six episodes respectively. The final five episodes of the season feature stand-alone mysteries.

During the first season, Thomas was unsure if the series's success was attributed to each episode's "case of the week" or the overarching story. He realized that fans were cool with the "case of the week" but returned for the ongoing mystery. Thomas felt that Bell had been overworked in the first season, and the mystery involving Logan and Weevil in the second season was an attempt to give her some time off. He said that the mystery arcs of the second season had "way too many suspects, way too many red herrings" and that the third season needed a change.

The third season was initially planned to include three separate mysteries that would be introduced and resolved in a series of non-overlapping story arcs. Thomas realized by talking to CW Entertainment President Dawn Ostroff that viewers got too confused by his original format, and the new format would allow new viewers to start watching at any point in the season. Inspired by the improvised thriller Bubble, Thomas started laying "subtle" motives for the second mystery during the first one, so that fans would have "a theory on whodunit" when it occurred. The first mystery took place over the first nine episodes. Originally, the second mystery was to be seven episodes long, and the third mystery was to occur over the last six episodes of the season. This was changed when The CW ordered a 20-episode season instead of the usual 22 episodes. The second mystery arc was shortened from seven episodes to six, and the third mystery was first changed from a six-episode arc to a five-episode arc. After an eight-week hiatus for the series was announced, the final mystery was changed to five stand-alone episodes designed to be friendlier to new viewers. The final mystery was originally going to be "unlike any of the others we've done before." Previously, "nice characters" like Wallace and Mac had always been absent from the big mystery because no one was going to believe them as a suspect. For the third mystery, Thomas had wanted to present a situation where Wallace and Mac could be fully involved, "key players [with] really interesting stuff to do."

=== Filming ===
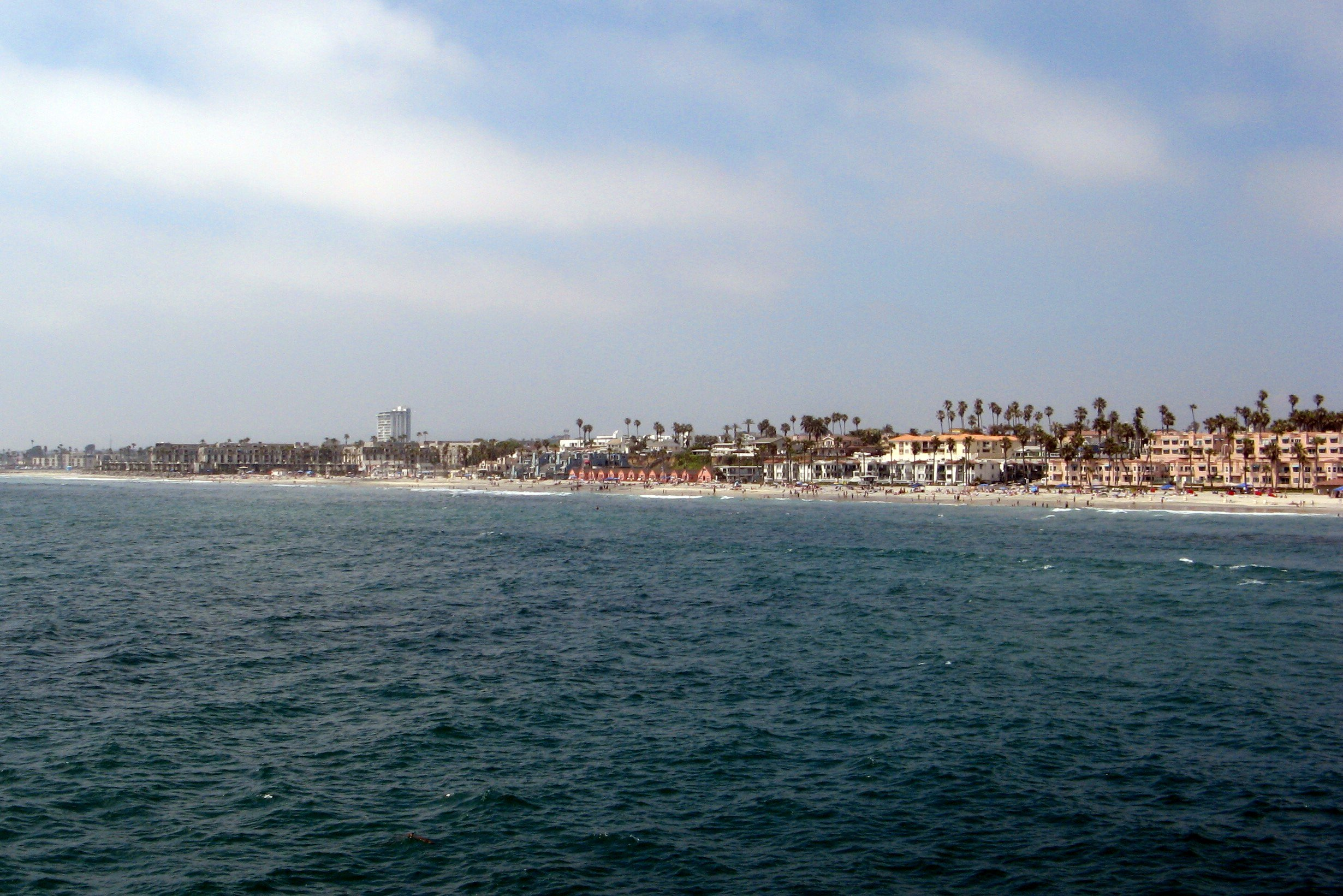
Oceanside, California, used as a stand-in for Neptune while filming the series

The original pilot was darker in tone than the one aired. Thomas intended to take the script to FX, HBO or Showtime, but gave UPN "credit" as they only wanted it a bit lighter to match their standards and practices. A lengthy debate considered whether Veronica could be a rape victim; UPN eventually agreed. In the aired pilot, Lilly was found by the pool in the same spot where she was murdered. However, Thomas stated that Lilly's body was originally going to be found in the ocean, and he had a plan for events that led there. Thomas pitched the idea to UPN, but the network felt that it was "too dark and creepy" for Jake to dispose of his daughter's body to protect his son, and the idea was changed.

Many of the series' scenes were filmed at Stu Segall Productions in San Diego, California. Producer Paul Kurta said that most of the Neptune scenes were filmed in Oceanside, California. Kurta liked that it was "a seaside town that still feels like middle-class people live there [...] Most of the seaside towns feel resort driven." It was estimated that the series spent $44 million a year shooting each season in San Diego, comprising more than half of the revenue generated by film production there in 2006.

The Neptune High setting was also in Oceanside. The school, Oceanside High School, was paid $7,750 by Stu Segall Productions for the use of the campus and extras. The series' third season setting of Hearst College was mostly filmed on the campuses of San Diego State University, University of San Diego and the University of California, San Diego. Filming locations were chosen by the director and by production designer Alfred Sole. Sole reportedly "really liked the look and feel of the school", and San Diego State University invited the series with "open arms". Taping at the university led to financial and employment benefits for the university and its students. Alumni worked as crew members while students worked as actors; half of the third season extras were students from the university's film department.

The fourth season was filmed in Hermosa Beach, California, primarily at the Sea Sprite Hotel.

=== Music ===
"We Used to Be Friends" by The Dandy Warhols was used as the series' theme song. Composer Josh Kramon was originally going to produce a noir version of a 1980s song for the theme. However, Rob Thomas was "pretty much set on finding a song," and "We Used to Be Friends" was chosen right from the beginning. TV critic Samantha Holloway considered this theme to be one of "the five most recognizable, sing-along-able, memorable and best theme songs." The theme song was remixed in a softer piano style with dark and vibrant electronic beats to reflect the more noir-influenced opening credits in the third season.

Kramon wrote the original background music to convey the film noir themes. For the pilot, Thomas wanted "a really atmospheric, kind of modern noir type of vibe," and Kramon used sounds similar to that of Air and Zero 7. Kramon used "traditional sounds" for the series but also processed and filtered them. Among the instruments used were piano, vibraphone, and guitar. When using an acoustic piano, Kramon would use compression to not sound like a traditional piano. Live bass and percussion were also used, as Kramon did not like to program them. The main instrument used was the guitar, but Kramon felt that the piano was "by far the most important instrument for working on TV shows, especially when you're doing everything yourself."

A week before choosing the sounds for the episodes, the crew had a "spotting session," where they would discuss with Thomas and the producers which type of music would be featured. Kramon did not decide the songs to be featured but composed and created the whole score. Since there was little orchestral music, and Kramon could play guitar, piano, bass, and drums, he played all parts without another musician. Veronica Mars: Original Television Soundtrack, a song compilation from the series' first and second seasons, was released by Nettwerk Records on September 27, 2005. Thomas revealed that the primary goal for the soundtrack was to "get more publicity, which will in turn hopefully get more viewers for the show".

== Cancellation, film and revival ==
=== Cancellation ===
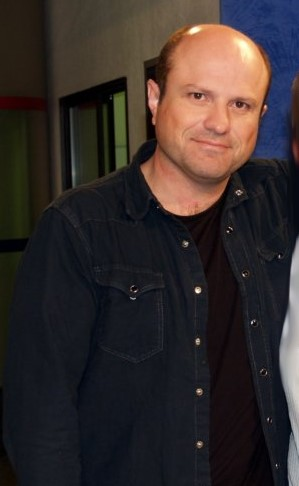
Enrico Colantoni, who played Veronica's father Keith Mars, expressed interest in the film adaption of the series.

In January 2007, Dawn Ostroff announced that while she was pleased with the gradual ratings improvement of Veronica Mars, the series would be put on hiatus after the February sweeps to air a new reality series, Pussycat Dolls Present. When the hiatus ended, the series returned for the last five episodes of the season. At the 2007 CW Upfront, Ostroff announced that Veronica Mars was not part of the new primetime lineup and was "not coming back". Thomas created a trailer that took place four years after the third-season finale, with the working title "Veronica in the FBI", and released it on the third season DVD. When asked if the FBI concept could happen, Ostroff said that the series was probably completely gone "in any form". Ostroff also said that Kristen Bell and Rob Thomas might collaborate on another project for the CW network. In June 2007, TV Guide writer Michael Ausiello confirmed that the cancellation of Veronica Mars was official.

=== Potential film progress ===
Thomas stated that he was interested in writing a feature film based on the series to provide closure to the storylines and character arcs. In September 2008, Michael Ausiello, writing for Entertainment Weekly, reported that Thomas had met with Bell to discuss the plot, which would likely involve Veronica solving crime in college rather than as an FBI agent. Thomas felt that the "FBI scenario was more of a 'What if...?'", aimed at getting a fourth season and that he "would want to bring back our key players, and it would be tough to believe that the FBI stationed Veronica in Neptune." Ausiello later reported that Enrico Colantoni would be involved in the project. Colantoni said that he was fully aware of the talks taking place, adding, "cult shows have translated well into the film arena. Nothing's official, but they're talking about it." In addition to the feature-film possibility, Thomas had a meeting with DC Comics to talk about a Veronica Mars comic book series.

In September 2008, Thomas told Entertainment Weekly that "I thought I had the idea broken, but I've hit a wall in the final act that I haven't quite figured out." Thomas explained that he had been very busy writing for Cupid and Party Down, both of which he created. In January 2009, TV Guide reported that the film was Thomas' first priority after Cupid. Thomas noted that as well as writing the script, someone would need to pay for the film, but indicated that producer Joel Silver was ready to green-light the film. In June 2009, Bell said "I don't think it will ever happen, and here's why: [Series creator] Rob Thomas and I had a powwow, and we were both 100 percent on board. We took our proposal to Warner Bros., and Joel Silver told us that there is no enthusiasm [there] to make a Veronica Mars movie, and that is, unfortunately, a roadblock we cannot compete with." At the 2010 TCA Winter Press Tour, Rob Thomas stated that the movie wouldn't be happening, "I would write it if anyone would finance it. If anyone's interested in making that movie, I am available, Kristen's [Bell] available. I would love to do it. I think the closest we came was Joel [Silver] pushing it at Warner Bros., and they didn't bite. It has sort of gone away." In April 2010, Thomas insisted, "it's not dead. I continue to want to do it [...] We're still looking into it." In June 2010, Silver was less optimistic about the film happening; "we analyzed all these areas about it. I talked to the home video people because a movie like that would be driven by video. The [season DVDs] didn't do that well... So they didn't feel there was a need or an audience."

=== Kickstarter project ===
On March 13, 2013, Rob Thomas and Kristen Bell launched a Kickstarter fundraiser in an attempt to get the film made, with the help of fans to reach the goal of $2 million. The campaign offered various incentives to those who donated more than $10. Thomas and Bell stated that they approached Warner Bros. with the idea and they approved and will be distributing the finished title. Bell, Thomas, Enrico Colantoni, Ryan Hansen, and Jason Dohring appeared in a video promoting the campaign that was shot in February 2012. The goal was met within 10 hours of the start of the campaign. The project broke several Kickstarter records, becoming the site's largest successful film project. The campaign ended on April 13, with 91,585 donors raising $5,702,153. Production began in June 2013, with a projected early 2014 release. In December 2013, Thomas announced that the release date would be March 14, 2014, a year and a day after the start of the Kickstarter project.

On April 5, Thomas had completed the first draft of the script. Several casting announcements were made through April to June, with confirmation of several returning cast members, including Jason Dohring (Logan Echolls), Enrico Colantoni (Keith Mars), Percy Daggs III (Wallace Fennel), Chris Lowell (Stosh "Piz" Piznarski), Francis Capra (Eli "Weevil" Navarro), Ryan Hansen (Dick Casablancas), and Tina Majorino (Cindy "Mac" Mackenzie), among several others.

The film had its world premiere at the South by Southwest film festival on March 8, 2014, and was released in theatres and through online platforms on March 14, 2014. The film grossed $3.5 million worldwide, and received positive reviews from critics, with a 79% approval rating on review aggregation website Rotten Tomatoes based on reviews from 125 critics, with an average score of 6.7 out of 10.

=== Revival series ===
In September 2018, Hulu officially confirmed the revival of Veronica Mars, and announced it would consist of eight episodes, and series creator Rob Thomas and Kristen Bell were confirmed to return. The plot revolves around a serial killer murdering spring breakers. Other returning cast members include Jason Dohring (Logan Echolls), Enrico Colantoni (Keith Mars), Percy Daggs III (Wallace Fennel), Francis Capra (Eli "Weevil" Navarro), Ryan Hansen (Dick Casablancas), and several others. New cast members include Dawnn Lewis, Patton Oswalt, Clifton Collins Jr., and J. K. Simmons. It was originally scheduled for release on July 26, 2019; however, Hulu released the season one week early on July 19 shortly after the series' appearance at San Diego Comic-Con.

== Other media ==
=== Novels ===
A series of novels, written by series creator Rob Thomas and Jennifer Graham, continue the story after the events of the Veronica Mars film and also feature Logan, Mac, Wallace, and Dick. The first novel, Veronica Mars: The Thousand Dollar Tan Line, was released by Random House on March 25, 2014, as a Vintage Books trade paperback (ISBN 978-0-8041-7070-3), an eBook (ISBN 978-0-8041-7071-0), and an unabridged audiobook read by Kristen Bell (ISBN 978-0-8041-9351-1). It featured the return of Veronica's mother, Lianne Mars. The second novel, Veronica Mars: Mr. Kiss and Tell, also published by Vintage Books, was released on January 20, 2015. Thomas has said in interviews that the novels are canon, and would not be negated by a future film.

=== Web spin-off ===
In January 2014, it was announced that a digital spin-off of Veronica Mars was in development with creator Rob Thomas. The metafictional concept features Ryan Hansen portraying himself in an attempt to make a spin-off based on his character Dick Casablancas. On August 13, 2014, it was announced that the web series, titled Play It Again, Dick, would premiere on September 18, 2014, on The CW's digital content website, CW Seed in 8-episode installments with a length of 8–10 minutes per installment. Other cast members returning include Kristen Bell, Jason Dohring, Enrico Colantoni, Percy Daggs III, Daran Norris, Francis Capra, Chris Lowell and Ken Marino, who portrayed their "Veronica Mars" characters as well as fictionalized versions of themselves.

== Reception ==
=== Ratings ===
Below, "rank" refers to how well Veronica Mars rated compared to other television series which aired during primetime hours of the corresponding television season. The television season begins in September of any given year and ends during the May of the following year. "Viewers" refers to the average number of viewers for all original episodes broadcast during the television season in the series' regular timeslot. "Rank" is shown with the total number of series airing on the six/five major English-language networks in a given season. The "season premiere" is the date that the first episode of the season aired. Similarly, the "season finale" is the date that the final episode of the season aired.

Season	Timeslot (ET)	Network	Season premiere	Season finale	TV season	Rank/ total series	Viewers (in millions)
1	Tuesday 9:00 pm	UPN	September 22, 2004	May 10, 2005	2004–2005	#148/156	2.5
2	Wednesday 9:00 pm (September 28, 2005 – April 5, 2006); Tuesday 9:00 pm (April 11, 2006 – May 9, 2006)	UPN	September 28, 2005	May 9, 2006	2005–2006	#145/156	2.3
3	Tuesday 9:00 pm (October 3, 2006 – May 22, 2007); Tuesday 8:00 pm (May 22, 2007)	The CW	October 3, 2006	May 22, 2007	2006–2007	#138/142	2.5

=== Critical reception ===
Critical response of Veronica Mars
Season	Rotten Tomatoes	Metacritic
1	97% (30 reviews)	81 (15 reviews)
2	92% (12 reviews)	—N/a
3	89% (18 reviews)	—N/a
4	89% (66 reviews)	75 (16 reviews)

Although not a ratings success, the series was a critical success from its first season. Robert Abele of LA Weekly said "in this smart, engaging series about a former popular girl turned crime-solving high school outcast, the hard-boiled dialogue comes from its teen protagonist's mouth in a way that stabs any potential cutesiness in the heart with an ice pick." In her review, Paige Wiser of the Chicago Sun Times said that "on Veronica Mars, wholesome is out; gritty reality is in. The show never soft-pedals the timeless, fundamental truth that high school is hell." Joyce Millman of The Phoenix felt that the series was "a character study masquerading as a high-school drama". Joy Press of The Village Voice saw the series as "a sharp teen noir in the making. Tinged with class resentment and nostalgia for Veronica's lost innocence, this series pulses with promise." Michael Abernethy of PopMatters said that "intrigue, drama, and humor, Veronica Mars is also a lesson book for the disenfranchised. Few TV series aim so high; even fewer succeed so well." James Poniewozik of Time labeled it as one of the six best dramas on television. He praised Bell as "a captivating star", and said that the series "uses its pulp premise to dramatize a universal teen experience: that growing up means sleuthing out the mystery of who you really are." Kay McFadden of The Seattle Times called the series an update to the "classic California film noir". She felt that Veronica Mars was the best new series on UPN, and that the title character was potentially "this season's most interesting character creation". McFadden described the series as "Alias in its attitude, Raymond Chandler in its writing and The O.C. in its class-consciousness." Stephanie Zacharek of Salon praised the first-season finale for being "just the sort of satisfying capper you look for in a series that, week after week, keeps you asking questions."

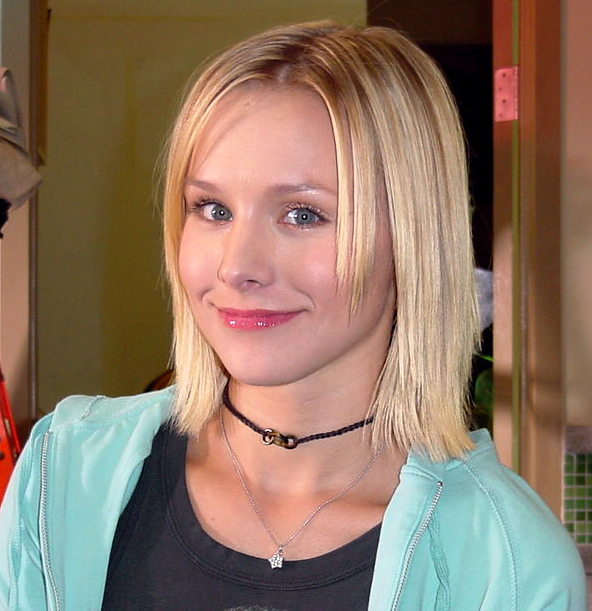
Kristen Bell's performance as Veronica Mars was praised, and several critics felt that she should have been nominated for an Emmy Award.

Veronica Mars was also positively received by other writers. Joss Whedon, who made a guest appearance in the second-season episode "Rat Saw God", said that it was the "Best. Show. Ever. Seriously, I've never gotten more wrapped up in a show I wasn't making, and maybe even more than those [...] These guys know what they're doing on a level that intimidates me. It's the Harry Potter of shows." Kevin Smith, who guest starred in the episode "Driver Ed", said that Veronica Mars was "hands-down, the best show on television right now, and proof that TV can be far better than cinema." Stephen King described the series as "Nancy Drew meets Philip Marlowe, and the result is pure nitro. Why is Veronica Mars so good? It bears little resemblance to life as I know it, but I can't take my eyes off the damn thing." Ed Brubaker called it "the best mystery show ever made in America."

Despite being a critical success throughout its run, criticisms began to emerge in its third season. Keith McDuffee of TV Squad described the third season as "disappointing," mainly because the episodes offered nothing new: "most fans of Veronica Mars felt that season three was clearly its weakest." Eric Goldman of IGN said that the main issue was the shift in the overall tone, with a lighter feeling than the previous seasons. He felt that Logan had been most affected by the tone change, robbed of his darker aspects, and changed into an "increasingly extraneous character." Goldman felt that despite the concerns over the final five episodes, the series ended with "three very strong episodes, with lots of strong dialogue and Veronica proving again just how tough she can be, and what a strong character she is." Goldman concluded that although the third season "was very choppy," it still had "plenty of witty dialogue and a continually engaging performance by Kristen Bell as the title character." The Pittsburgh Post-Gazette opined that Veronica Mars had taken a dive "creatively", from "the mopier version of its theme song to stalled storylines." The reviewer felt that "the arcing mysteries had grown less convincing and compelling as time went on and were too drawn out." Fox News Channel's Bridget Byrne pointed out that Veronica had "gone from punky to—dare we say—preppy" in the third season. Byrne further explained that "with her quick, bright wit and sharp eye for life's darker moments [Veronica] has left high school and is going to college, doffing her dark threads and spiked tresses for something a little more stylish."

The series, described as a "critical darling", appeared on a number of fall television best lists. In 2005, the series was featured on AFI's TV Programs of the Year, and on the lists of MSN TV, The Village Voice, the Chicago Tribune, People Weekly and the Pittsburgh Post-Gazette. It was named the second best series by Ain't It Cool News, fourth best returning series by Time, fifth best series by Newsday, PopMatters and San Jose Mercury-News, and sixth best by Entertainment Weekly and USA Today. In 2006, the series was ranked number one on the lists of Ain't It Cool News and the Chicago Sun-Times, and was ranked number six by Metacritic. In 2007, the series ranked number 18 on TV Guide's list of the "Top Cult Shows Ever". In 2008, AOL TV ranked Veronica Mars the 10th Best School Show of All Time. The same year, British film magazine Empire ranked it number 48 in their list of the "50 Greatest TV Shows of All Time". The magazine said that "smart storylines and witty riffs on pop culture pepper the scripts, while Kristen Bell lent ballsy charm to the title role and ensured that every episode of the show's three seasons was television gold. Its untimely cancellation was a slap in the face that still smarts to this day." Empire named "Not Pictured" the best episode of the series. In 2010, Kristin dos Santos of E! ranked Veronica Mars number 8 on her list, "Top 20 TV Series of the Past 20 Years". The A.V. Club named it the 15th best TV series of the 2000s (decade).

In 2012, Entertainment Weekly listed the show at #13 in the "25 Best Cult TV Shows from the Past 25 Years", with the comments, "It's not easy telling the story of a girl's mission to solve her best friend's murder – while also investigating her own rape – but creator Rob Thomas' tough assignment was made easier by putting the tirelessly smart and snarky Veronica Mars on the case. Her wry one-liners injected much-needed lightness into sometimes grim mysteries."

In 2020, Briana Kranich of Screen Rant ranked Veronica Mars as the top contender of The 10 Best TV Teen Heroines.

=== Fandom ===
Veronica Mars has attracted a loyal and dedicated fan base. A group of fans calling themselves the "Cloud Watchers" organized several campaigns to bring more viewers to the series to ensure its continuation. The group hired a plane to fly over the CW offices, carrying a banner reading "Renew Veronica Mars." The group hired street teams in New York, Los Angeles, Philadelphia, and Chicago to distribute 30,000 fliers advertising the series' return after its midseason hiatus in the third season. The "Cloud Watchers" raised $50,000 in donations and through the sale of Veronica Mars clothing and tchotchkes. Upon the cancellation of the series, fans sent more than 10,000 Mars Bars to the CW, hoping that the network would reverse its decision and renew the series. Rob Thomas thanked the fans of the series for their efforts, saying, "I love those people, and they have been so good to me, but it's not going to happen." A feature film continuation was made possible in 2013 through a Kickstarter fund, in which 91,585 fans donated $5,702,153 to get the film made. Fans have also come to refer to themselves and be referred to as "Marshmallows" by media as well as the cast and crew of the series after a line delivered by Wallace (Percy Daggs III) in the pilot episode: "You're a marshmallow, Veronica Mars. A Twinkie." At the end of the same episode, Veronica in voiceover remarks "Well, you know what they say: 'Veronica Mars, she's a marshmallow.'" A reference to the term was also included in the fan-funded film.

=== Awards and nominations ===
Awards and nominations for Veronica Mars
Year	Award	Recipient	Result
2004	Saturn Award for Best Television Actress	Kristen Bell	Nominated
2005	American Film Institute Award for Television Programs of the Year	Veronica Mars	Won
2005	Satellite Award for Outstanding Actress in a Series, Drama	Kristen Bell	Nominated
2005	Saturn Award for Best Television Actress	Kristen Bell	Won
2005	Saturn Award for Best Network Television Series	Veronica Mars	Nominated
2005	Teen Choice Award for Choice TV Breakout Show	Veronica Mars	Nominated
2005	Teen Choice Award for Choice TV Breakout Performance, Female	Kristen Bell	Nominated
2005	Television Critics Association Awards for Outstanding New Program of the Year	Veronica Mars	Nominated
2005	Television Critics Association Awards for Individual Achievement in Drama	Kristen Bell	Nominated
2006	Family Television Award for Favorite Father/Daughter	Kristen Bell; Enrico Colantoni	Won
2006	International Cinematographers Guild Publicists Award for The Maxwell Weinberg; Publicist Showmanship Award for Television	Veronica Mars	Nominated
2006	Satellite Award for Actress in a Series, Drama	Kristen Bell	Nominated
2006	Saturn Award for Best Actress on Television	Kristen Bell	Nominated
2006	Teen Choice Award for Choice TV Actress: Drama/Action Adventure	Kristen Bell	Nominated
2006	Teen Choice Award for Choice TV Sidekick	Percy Daggs III	Nominated
2006	Teen Choice Award for Choice TV Parental Unit	Enrico Colantoni	Nominated
2006	Writers Guild of America Award for Episodic Drama	Rob Thomas for "Normal Is the Watchword"	Nominated

== Distribution ==
=== International ===
The CTV Television Network began airing Veronica Mars in Canada as a mid-season replacement on May 30, 2005. CTV decided not to pick up the second season, which began broadcast by Sun TV on July 18, 2006. The third season was initially only available through American border stations. The fourth season premiered in Canada on the Crave streaming service (owned by the same company as CTV) within a few hours of its U.S. release on Hulu on July 19, 2019.

Subscription channel Living began showing the series in the United Kingdom in October 2005, averaging 50,000 viewers per episode for its first season. The channel began airing the second season on June 8, 2006, airing one episode per week rather than showing one every night as they did in the first season. Despite low ratings in the second season, Living decided to air the series' third season. It was syndicated through the Living TV Group platform, airing on the now defunct channel Trouble just before its closure. Free-to-air channel E4 began broadcasting the series from July 16, 2009.

Veronica Mars premiered in Australia by Network Ten on November 28, 2005, where the series saw erratic airings. TV2 began showing the series in New Zealand on July 15, 2005.

=== Home media ===
The first season of Veronica Mars was released in region 1 as a widescreen six-disc DVD box set on October 11, 2005. In addition to all the episodes that had been aired, DVD extras included an extended "Pilot" episode (through the inclusion of an unaired opening sequence) and over 20 minutes of unaired scenes. The same set was released on May 16, 2008, in Region 2, and on June 4, 2008, in Region 4.

The second season was released in region 1 as a widescreen six-disc DVD box set on August 22, 2006, Region 2 on August 15, 2008, and Region 4 on September 8, 2008. In addition to all the aired episodes, DVD extras included two featurettes: "A Day on the Set with Veronica Mars" and "Veronica Mars: Not Your Average Teen Detective", a gag reel, a promo trailer for the third season and additional scenes, including an alternate ending to "My Mother, the Fiend".

The third season was released in region 1 as a widescreen six-disc DVD box set on October 23, 2007, Region 2 on December 12, 2008, and Region 4 on February 11, 2009. In addition to all the aired episodes, DVD extras included "Pitching Season 4", an interview with Rob Thomas discussing a new direction for the series that picks up years later, with Veronica as a rookie FBI agent; "Going Undercover with Rob Thomas"; webisode gallery with cast interviews and various set tours; unaired scenes with introductions by Rob Thomas; and a gag reel.

In the United Kingdom, Veronica Mars: The Complete Collection was released on May 12, 2014. The set contains all three seasons and the film in an 18-disc set. This is the first time the series received a release in the UK, as the seasons were not released individually.

=== Syndication ===
In July and August 2005, four episodes of the first season aired on CBS, UPN's sibling network, to gain more exposure for the series.

The series aired on SOAPnet in 2012 until its shutdown a year later. Pivot began airing the series in January 2014 until its shutdown 2 years later. Beginning in May 2026, Start TV acquired the series.
