= The Bitch Is Back (Veronica Mars) =

- Veronica Mars episode
- Veronica walks away from the voting booth in the rain after casting a probably insignificant vote for her father. Regarding the imagery of the scene, series creator Rob Thomas stated that it was "a pretty melancholy way to go out".
- Episode no.: Season 3 Episode 20
- Directed by: Michael Fields
- Written by: Rob Thomas; Diane Ruggiero
- Production code: 3T5820
- Original air date: May 22, 2007
- Running time: 42 minutes

Guest appearances
- Kyle Secor as Jake Kane; Max Greenfield as Deputy Leo D'Amato; Matthew Alan as Gorya "Gory" Sorokin; Joaquin Perez Campbell as Domonick Desante; David Tom as Chip Diller; Chastity Dotson as Nish Sweeney; Christopher B. Duncan as Clarence Wiedman; K. C. Clyde as Deputy Gills

Episode chronology
← Previous "Weevils Wobble But They Don't Go Down"	Next → "Spring Break Forever"
- Veronica Mars season 3

"The Bitch Is Back" is the series finale of the initial run of the American mystery television series Veronica Mars, the twentieth and final episode of the show's third season, and the 64th episode overall. Co-written by series creator Rob Thomas and executive producer Diane Ruggiero and directed by Michael Fields, the episode premiered on The CW on May 22, 2007, directly after the previous episode, "Weevils Wobble But They Don't Go Down". The series depicts the adventures of Veronica Mars (Kristen Bell) as she navigates life as a college student while moonlighting as a private detective.

In this episode, Veronica investigates the origins of a sex tape of her and Stosh "Piz" Piznarski (Chris Lowell). Renouncing Logan Echolls (Jason Dohring) because he assaulted Piz, Veronica eventually discovers that the perpetrators are a secret society at Hearst College known as the Castle, headed by Jake Kane (Kyle Secor). Meanwhile, Parker Lee (Julie Gonzalo) ends her relationship with Logan, and Keith Mars (Enrico Colantoni) navigates the issues surrounding his candidacy in the upcoming sheriff's election.

Several days prior to airing "The Bitch Is Back", The CW announced that the series was cancelled. In an effort to prevent Veronica Mars from being cancelled, Thomas had filmed a twelve-minute pitch for a concept involving Veronica in the FBI Academy, but it was rejected. When writing the episode, Thomas and Ruggiero removed seven minutes of material from the original cut; they wanted to create an ambiguous finale that did not resolve everything neatly. At the time of its original broadcast, the episode was viewed by 2.15 million people and received mostly positive reviews from television critics.

== Plot ==
Logan regretfully informs Veronica that there is a sex video circulating of her and Piz, handing her a burned DVD; she berates him and denies the recording is authentic. After viewing the video, she goes to find Piz, who is badly bruised and bleeding, to confirm he was not involved in recording the footage, which he was not. Learning Logan attacked Piz due to mistakenly believing Piz made and released the video, Parker confronts Logan in his hotel room, tearfully breaking up with him because his actions show he still loves Veronica. Veronica arrives as Parker is leaving, and yells at him for attacking Piz, and cuts him out of her life. She then confronts Dick about the origins of the sex tape, who reveals that he got it from Chip Diller. Veronica intimidates Chip and gets Domonick Desante's name, but Domonick steadfastly refuses to tell her anything. Veronica warns Domonick that he'll regret his refusal, and follows through by cancelling Domonick's credit cards and enlisting Weevil's help to remove Domonick's tires from his car. This leads him to name Gorya Sorokin, whom Veronica later wiretaps, looking for answers.

The wiretap leads her to a secret contact method, where she sets up surveillance and is shocked to catch Wallace (Percy Daggs III) as one of the participants. Veronica talks to Wallace and he realizes it's connected to the secret society, The Castle, for which he is being recruited. Wallace tells Veronica that he's out, but she asks him to continue in order to aid her in figuring out what's going on. Wallace discovers the equipment used to tape him in his initial initiation was similar to that which was used to film Veronica and Piz. The members make Wallace go into a room with a chair and a camera, strip down to his underwear and put on a shock collar, and proceed to ask him very personal questions. He hears random yelling, and is told that other recruits will be shocked if he answers untruthfully. He is shocked once when he tells the truth, and upon complaint, he is informed that someone else lied and he received the punishment. When they find Veronica's spy pen in Wallace's discarded clothes, they forcibly remove him, but he is able to figure out the identity of one of the other recruits. Veronica sneaks into the house of the recruit Wallace names, which is revealed to be the Kane residence first by a large portrait of Lilly Kane (Amanda Seyfried), and then by another of Duncan Kane. Approaching voices forces Veronica into hiding behind a curtain, where she observes two men, one of whom is Jake Kane, discussing The Castle. After they leave, Veronica steals Jake's hard drive.

Keith, as interim sheriff, investigates the robbery the following day, spotting Veronica on a surveillance camera belonging to Kane's neighbor; however, he does not initially report his daughter. Veronica brings the hard drive to Mac (Tina Majorino) for help, and Mac leads her to a campus supercomputer to crack Jake Kane's very secure password. The supercomputer finally cracks the password and they discover documents, audios, and videos, some dating back to the 1930s, incriminating The Castle members for various ill deeds and illegal activity, taken at the time of each individuals' initiation (similar to what they tried to do to Wallace). When Veronica arrives home, she finds her room tossed, and realizes it was Keith, who questions Veronica about whether or not she broke into the Kane house, despite already surmising her guilt from the evidence. Jake and a county prosecutor arrive at Keith's office the next day, indicating they will get a judge's order and return to prosecute Veronica. Keith hands over the surveillance evidence to the county prosecutor later, after he first visited the evidence room, and erased the DVD with a nearby magnet to hide Veronica's involvement. This leads to a newspaper article announcing charges filed against Keith for tampering with evidence, likely meaning that he will lose the sheriff's election.

Logan tries to apologize to Veronica, but is rebuffed. Moments later, Gorya brags to Veronica that the organization videotaped her, and Logan assaults him, despite Veronica's warning that Gorya is 'connected-connected'. Veronica later returns the hard drive to Jake Kane on the condition that he does not tell Keith about it. She goes into a voting booth and votes for Keith as sheriff, then walks away in pouring rain, leaving many open-ended questions.

== Production ==
=== Writing, filming, and promotion ===
"The Bitch Is Back" was co-written by series creator Rob Thomas and executive producer Diane Ruggiero and directed by Michael Fields. The episode marked Thomas's ninth writing credit, Ruggiero's seventeenth installment of the series, and Fields's eighth episode. The scene in which Veronica rebukes Logan was included because the writers thought that it would be a good note on which to end a season, even though it would not be the two characters' final interaction in the series. Fields was heavily involved with the actors during filming of this scene.

Thomas highlighted the scene in which Logan attacks the Castle member for showcasing the romantic ambiguity between Logan, Veronica, and Piz. Thomas counseled Lowell about his facial expression before filming, and he was pleased with the result, stating that "it breaks my heart". While editing the final script, Thomas and Ruggiero had to remove roughly seven minutes from the original draft, including a scene featuring dialogue between Veronica and Leo. Later, Thomas thought that removing this scene made one voiceover by Veronica too sudden.

Thomas called the scene in which Keith makes Veronica dinner "quintessential Keith" and indicative of his lasting commitment to his daughter. Despite knowing that the episode could be the series finale, Thomas did not want it to completely resolve all plot lines; his intention was to keep viewers guessing and prevent the conclusion from being too bland or typical. He ultimately felt that the final shot of Veronica walking away from the voting booth in the rain was "a pretty melancholy way to go out". The song "It Never Rains in Southern California" by Albert Hammond plays during the final scene. In promotional advertising for the episode, The CW billed it as a season finale, despite the fact that the series had already been cancelled.

=== FBI pitch ===
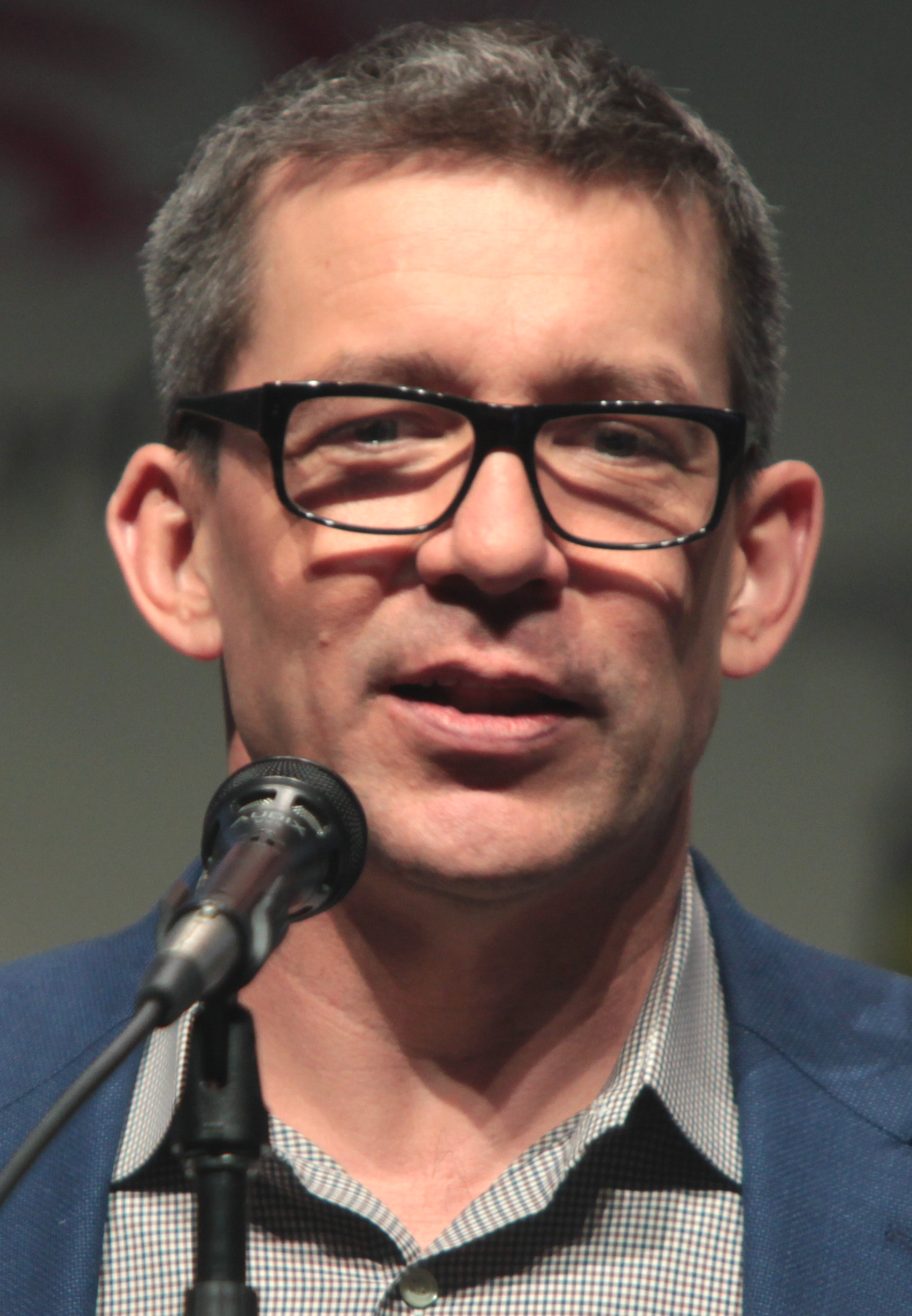
Series creator Rob Thomas created the FBI concept.

Before cancellation, Thomas proposed his idea for season four to take place in the FBI Academy. Prior to the airing of "Un-American Graffiti", Enrico Colantoni stated that The CW had seen the filmed first ten pages and reacted negatively. However, Thomas denied this assertion and commented that The CW had not yet seen the FBI pitch. He added that it would be presented on May 2, the day after the series came off a two-month hiatus. Thomas's statement was confirmed by a representative for the network.

Thomas filmed a twelve-minute teaser for his new concept and presented it to The CW. The teaser was later released on the Veronica Mars third season DVD and the internet. The clip begins in medias res with Veronica, pretending to be a high schooler, talking to a teacher. The teaser flashes back to her first FBI meeting, and the viewers discover that she is investigating the teacher for sexual abuse allegations. She successfully catches the teacher on camera, and at the FBI, she runs into a former acquaintance named Seth. She investigates a potential bomber with another novice agent, and they speak to a man who appears to be innocent. However, he points a gun at Veronica's partner as the clip ends.

Thomas had initially planned for Veronica to be in the FBI during a hypothetical seventh or eighth season of Veronica Mars. He accelerated his initial vision of the show in an attempt to prevent its cancellation. Although he believed that the new concept would appeal to CW executives, he commented, "I'd be thrilled for [Veronica] to come back in any incarnation."

The teaser was presented to the network on May 2, 2007. Nellie Andreeva of The Hollywood Reporter wrote that Dawn Ostroff, president of The CW at the time, had responded positively to the new concept. The series's title might have been changed if the FBI idea had been accepted. The CW had recently cancelled Gilmore Girls, leading some news outlets to speculate that Veronica Mars might be renewed in order to fill a schedule hole. Several cast members, including Gonzalo and Lowell, had taken other acting opportunities in anticipation of the series's cancellation. Nevertheless, Thomas stated, "I don't think we're dead; I kind of like our chances."

=== Cancellation ===
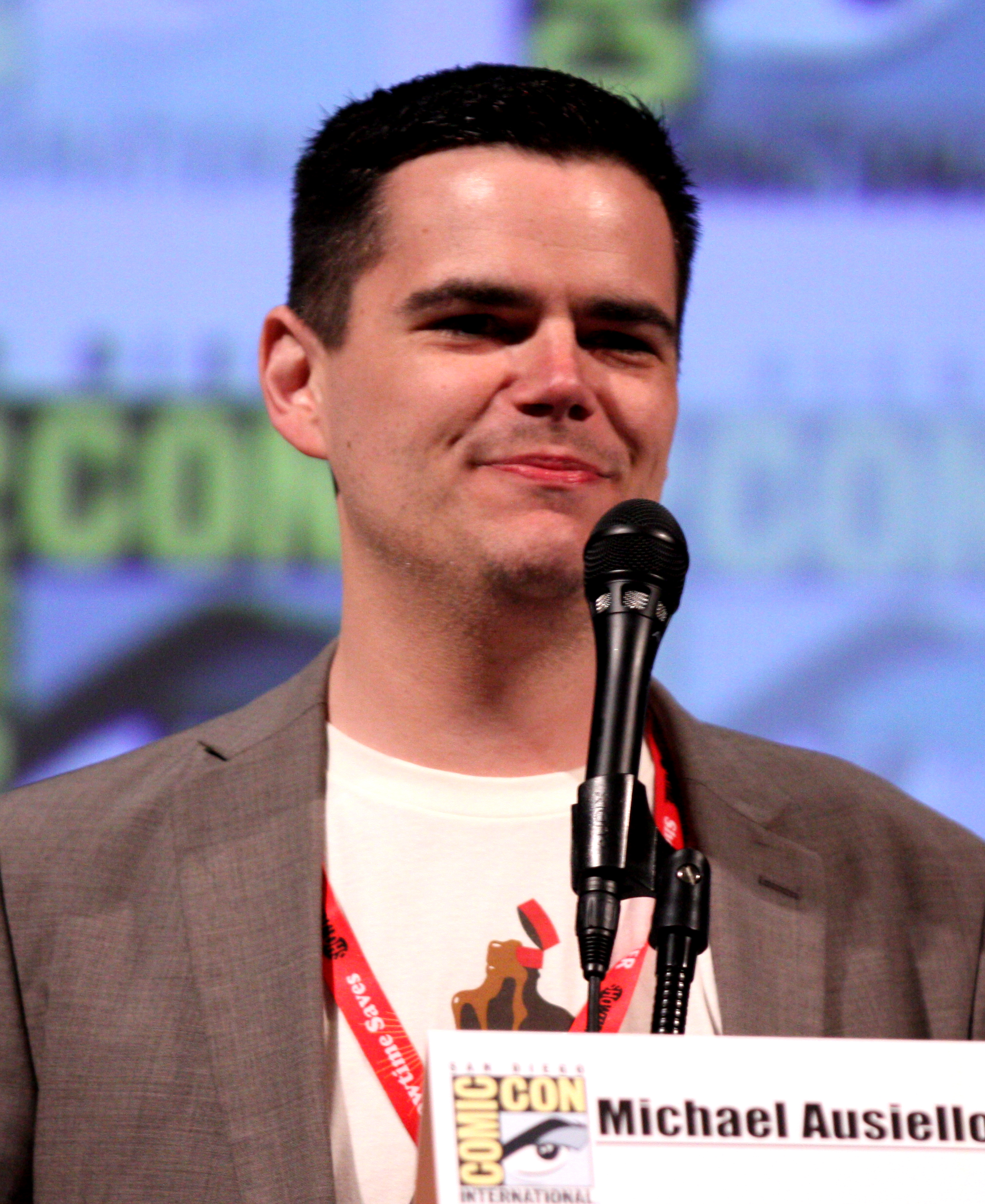
Michael Ausiello initially reported on the series's cancellation.

Veronica Mars was one of roughly five series being considered for cancellation by the network in 2007. At The CW's upfront conference, critic Michael Ausiello asked Ostroff about the fate of the show. She responded that Thomas and Bell could work together on another show for the network, but she thought that this possibility was unlikely. She said that "it could come back in some form, but I don't know what form that would be". Thomas responded, "I assume that anything Dawn would be talking about in the realm of a Rob–Kristen project would involve a new from-scratch pilot as they don't have me in a deal, and they'll lose Kristen in a couple of weeks."

At the conference, Ostroff officially cancelled the series, saying about the FBI idea that "it's not going to happen". Upon the cancellation of the series, a group of fans who called themselves the "Cloud Watchers" sent more than 10,000 Mars bars to The CW, hoping that the network would reverse its decision and renew the series. Several years after cancellation, Thomas expressed interest in creating a feature film based on the show.

== Analysis ==
As Veronica Mars walked down Southern California's rainy streets and off our screens for the very last time, the point seemed emphatically clear and killingly accurate. Life's a bitch until you die.

— Roger Holland, PopMatters

Several reviewers have commented on themes of the episode; topics of discussion included the relationship between parents and children, class relations, the scene in which Logan attacks the perpetrator in Veronica's sex tape case, and the final scene in relation to the overall moral of the series. According to Rowan Kaiser of The A.V. Club, the episode contained a role reversal between Veronica and Keith, with Keith violating the law. She noted the scene in which Keith erases the surveillance tapes of Veronica as illustrating the theme that "the two aren't so different after all." Roger Holland of PopMatters thought that the episode demonstrated that Veronica and Keith's relationship was the central component of the show: "it was all about Veronica and Keith. And beyond that, about parents, children, and the myriad ways they can fuck each other up." Stephanie Zacharek, writing for Salon, thought that the final scenes of "The Bitch Is Back" "cement the dour reality, posited at the very beginning of the series, that the rich ... are always going to be the ones in charge."

Holland referred to Veronica's line "I don't want his apology" in the scene in which Logan assaults Gorya Sorokin as indicative of one of the main themes of the series: "She's not interested in apologies. She's driven by a nihilistic need for action and payback." Eric Goldman of IGN wrote that the scene "had an air of ambiguity that could be interpreted in many ways." The reviewer elaborated that Veronica's smile could have indicated further romantic interest or that Logan might have been killed in retaliation for attacking Gorya. Zacharek stated that the episode's ending "[felt] truncated, unfinished. It gave us no clear signposts telling us where, exactly, these characters are headed next, where they'll end up." Holland said that the theme of the final scene "seemed emphatically clear and killingly accurate. Life's a bitch until you die." Goldman wrote that the ending was fitting for the series: "Veronica Mars wasn't exactly a show that was driven by happy thoughts or events, even though we wouldn't have minded the characters ending up happy."

== Reception ==
=== Ratings ===
On its initial showing, "The Bitch Is Back" was viewed by 2.15 million viewers, ranking 74th of 85 in the weekly rankings. This figure was an increase from the previous episode, "Weevils Wobble But They Don't Go Down", which aired immediately prior and garnered 1.78 million watchers. However, this number was a ratings decrease from both the third season premiere, "Welcome Wagon", and the previous season finale, "Not Pictured", which received 3.36 and 2.42 million viewers, respectively.

=== Reviews ===
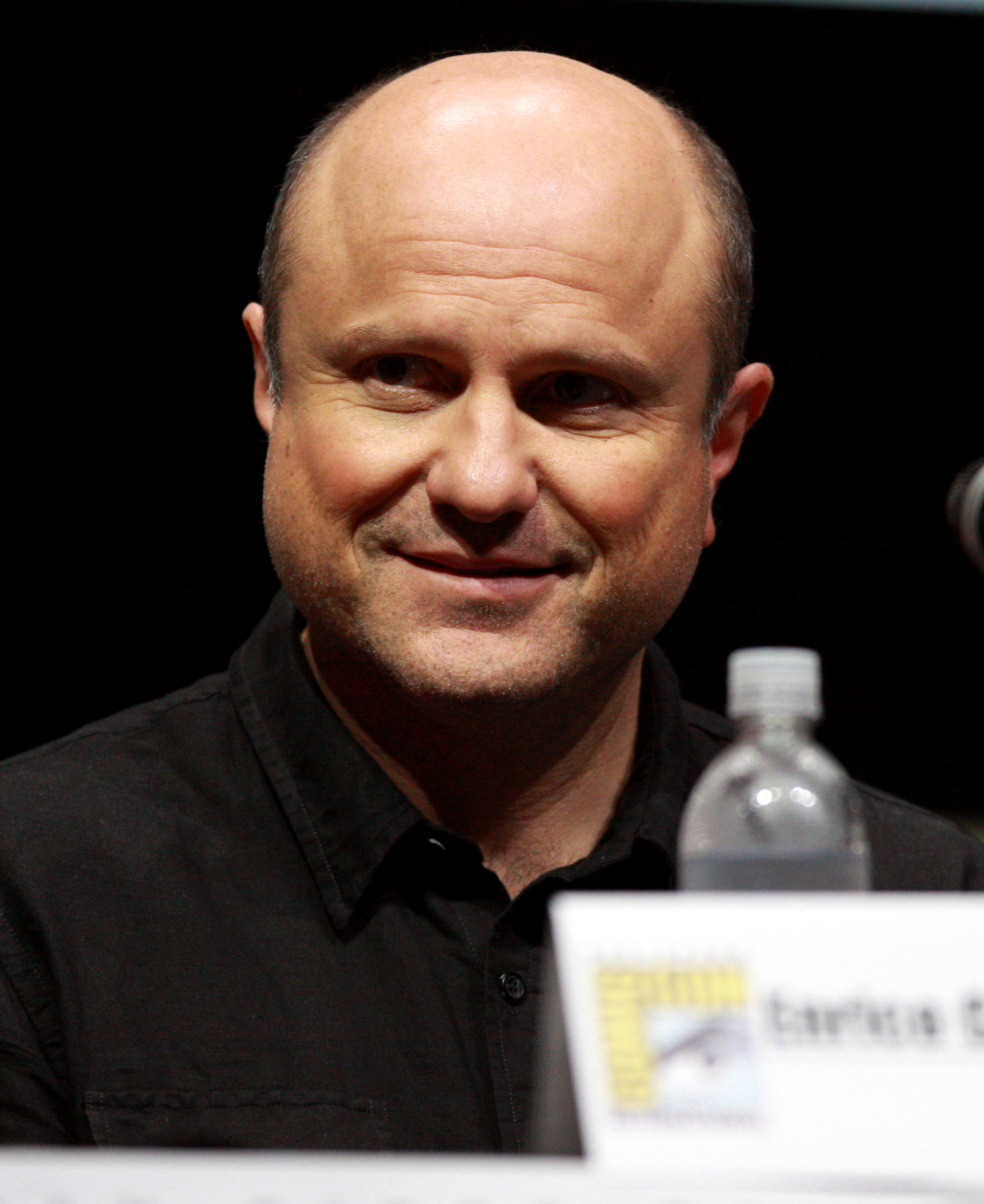
Enrico Colantoni's performance was frequently singled out for praise.

The episode received mostly positive reviews from television critics. Eric Goldman of IGN graded the episode an 8.3 out of 10, indicating that it was "great". He thought that the finale did not resolve every plot line by the end of the episode. However, he did not blame the writers, because they were not planning for the episode to be a series finale. He enjoyed the final scene between Logan, Veronica, and Piz because of the variety of different ways in which it could be interpreted. While he expressed some frustration over Keith's criminal charges and the ambiguity regarding the outcome of the sheriff's election, he opined that one could still take away important messages from the show because of Keith's actions in the episode. The reviewer also lauded the final scene, writing that "the melancholy feeling of the final scene – with Veronica walking through the rain, having cast a vote for her dad that is probably meaningless – felt right for the series".

Amy Ratcliffe of IGN listed "The Bitch Is Back" as the eighth-best episode of Veronica Mars. She wrote that the episode "brings the show full circle", returning Veronica to the position of a social outcast, and concluded by describing the episode as "a winner". Alan Sepinwall, on his blog, What's Alan Watching?, praised the episode, stating that it was one of his favorite installments of the series. He thought that the series's early film noir influences returned in the finale, a choice he lauded. In addition, he commended Bell and Colantoni's performances, stating that the final scene "is a bleak ending, but strangely appropriate".

Television Without Pity graded the episode an "A". Rowan Kaiser, writing for The A.V. Club, praised the finale, writing that it functioned well within the context of the series and the season:

We get significant emotional resolution between Keith and Veronica, whose relationship is the core of the show. We get to see Veronica being a badass, which is when Veronica Mars is at its most entertaining. All the supporting characters get something defining to do. The show engages with its history. And most importantly, it's a fantastic episode.

She went on to laud the interaction between Veronica and Keith and the latter's eventual sacrifice for his daughter. In addition, she felt that the supporting characters, including Wallace, Parker, and Piz, also received appropriate sendoffs. She later ranked the episode as his fifth-favorite of the series. Kelly West of Cinema Blend gave a mixed review. She enjoyed the elements that resembled the first season, such as the return of Jake Kane and the portrait of Lilly. She thought that "The Bitch Is Back" was satisfying within the context of the season, but that it was too ambiguous for a series finale: "How can the show not come back? How can they leave us with Veronica and Logan still apart?"

Stephanie Zacharek of Salon felt positively about the episode itself but ambivalent about the lack of resolution, stating, "I'm not sure if Tuesday night's finale is a deeply unsatisfying way to close out a series that's ending before its time or the only way to end such a series." However, she blamed the network for this ending. She also commented on the tone and themes of the episode, arguing that one of the series's main takeaways was that the rich would always be in charge. However, she did not view the finale as being spiteful and pessimistic: "'Veronica Mars' has always been a clear-eyed show, never a bitter one." Tanner Stransky of Entertainment Weekly felt unsatisfied with the episode's conclusion, partially because Veronica and Logan did not resume dating. However, he praised the sex-tape mystery and the plot involving the Castle because of their similarities to earlier seasons. He also praised Keith's actions, stating, "Okay, maybe I'm a sap, but this tugged at my heartstrings a bit and left me relieved there wasn't a dreaded Veronica–Keith battle at the end." Stransky concluded by saying that "the end is fine". Sydney Bucksbaum of Zap2it felt disappointed because of the ambiguous endings of Keith's arc and Veronica's love triangle. Although she was positive towards "The Bitch Is Back" as a standalone episode, she found herself hoping that there were another episode to the season: "Watching Veronica walk out into the pouring rain all alone after casting a probably insignificant vote for her dad was depressing, symbolic (rain in SoCal?), and just downright unsatisfying."

Roger Holland of PopMatters praised the episode. He wrote that the finale "took us all the way back to the heart of Veronica Mars". Although he also commented on the lack of closure in "The Bitch Is Back", he still believed that the finale highlighted some of the main themes of the series. "The final scenes of Veronica Mars offered no sense of closure. Rather, we were left with the sense [that] we'd been denied a genuinely thrilling fourth season". The TV Addict lauded the episode for returning to the tone and themes of the first season, calling it "the perfect mix of mystery, excitement, romance and snappy one-liners". The publication also praised Bell and Colantoni's performances. Jesse Hastenger of PopMatters graded the episode an 8 out of 10. Kath Skerry of Give Me My Remote expressed dissatisfaction with The CW for cancelling the series, but she praised the episode as a standalone installment: "As for the final two episodes themselves, they would have been magnificent season finales. It was classic Veronica Mars. Drama, comedy, inside jokes [...] and callbacks to yesteryear." On his blog, Cultural Learnings, critic Myles McNutt said that Colantoni should have been nominated for a Primetime Emmy Award for Outstanding Lead Actor in a Drama Series for his performance in the episode, saying that "this final sacrifice is Colantoni's strongest character arc all season and is the proper episode selection for the actor." On a ranking of all 64 Veronica Mars episodes, BuzzFeed ranked the episode 54th, declaring that it was "extremely disappointing" and "pretty dull".
