= Look Who's Stalking =

- Veronica Mars episode
- At the alternative prom, Logan and Veronica have a heartfelt talk, with Logan confessing that he still regrets that they broke up.
- Episode no.: Season 2 Episode 20
- Directed by: Michael Fields
- Written by: John Enbom
- Production code: 2T7220
- Original air date: April 25, 2006

Guest appearances
- Jeffrey Sams as Terrence Cook; Michael Muhney as Don Lamb; Tina Majorino as Cindy "Mac" Mackenzie; Krysten Ritter as Gia Goodman; Adam Hendershott as Vincent "Butters" Clemmons; Max Greenfield as Deputy Leo D'Amato; Steve Rankin as Lloyd Blankenship; James Jordan as Tommy "Lucky" Dohanic; Charisma Carpenter as Kendall Casablancas; Steve Guttenberg as Woody Goodman

Episode chronology
← Previous "Nevermind the Buttocks"	Next → "Happy Go Lucky"
- Veronica Mars season 2

"Look Who's Stalking" is the twentieth episode of the second season of the American mystery television series Veronica Mars, and the forty-second episode overall. Written by John Enbom and directed by Michael Fields, the episode premiered on UPN on April 25, 2006.

The series depicts the adventures of Veronica Mars (Kristen Bell) as she deals with life as a high school student while moonlighting as a private detective. In this episode, Gia (Krysten Ritter) asks Veronica for help in tracking someone who is stalking her. Meanwhile, Logan (Jason Dohring) and Dick (Ryan Hansen) organize an alternative prom when the traditional one is cancelled, and Veronica and Logan almost reignite their previous relationship.

== Synopsis ==
Veronica is diagnosed with chlamydia but not given the appropriate counseling or contact tracing. At school, there is a notice that the prom has been cancelled. Keith finds Woody in a room with an unconscious woman. Gia asks Veronica for help in tracking a stalker, and Veronica accepts. Keith investigates Kendall, and steals her hard drive from her secret house. Kendall threatens Keith for her hard drive. Veronica and Gia track the car that has been following Gia, and find out that it belongs to Leo D'Amato (Max Greenfield). Veronica asks Logan about whether Duncan was sleeping with anyone else, and he invites her to an "Alterna-Prom". Veronica talks to Leo about Gia, and he says that he was hired to watch Gia. Keith is framed for the drunk woman in Woody's hotel room, and Keith reveals that he is voting against Woody's incorporation bill. Gia receives a stalker-ish tape. The drunk woman has disappeared. Veronica invites Jackie and Wallace to the Alterna-Prom. Keith visits Terrence in the hospital. Veronica and Gia find out that the videographer was a varsity letterman driving a red pickup truck.

Veronica votes "no" on incorporation. Keith's version of the story comes out, and incorporation fails. Keith connects Gia's footage to the footage shot of Woody's house a few months earlier and deduces that Woody is hiding something. Logan recognizes a sketch of a suspect in the case of Cliff's stolen briefcase. Gia starts ignoring Veronica because of the situation with their fathers. Veronica notices that the pickup truck belongs to Lucky, the janitor. Veronica finds Gia and Lucky alone in the school building. Lucky pulls out a knife before Keith breaks in and arrests him. Sheriff Lamb arrives, but Lucky says that Woody had a good reason to be threatened. The Alterna-Prom starts, and Mac and Butters come, to Mac's chagrin. Veronica jokingly confronts Madison about her relationship with Lamb, and Wallace and Jackie get a room.

Logan professes his love to Veronica and tears up. They are about to kiss, but Veronica says that she has to leave. Lucky is about to tell Keith more about Woody before Meg's father bails him out. There is a story in the newspaper about Terrence Cook throwing a baseball game. Veronica visits Logan's hotel suite and apologizes. She says that she wants to give their friendship another try, but Logan spent the night with Kendall. Veronica leaves with tears in her eyes.

== Cultural references ==
The following cultural references are made in the episode:

- Gia sang "Can't Get You Out of My Head" as a karaoke song.
- Veronica references a song from The Music Man.
- Gia mentions Mission: Impossible and Tom Cruise.
- At one point, Veronica jokes that she is updating her Netflix queue.
- Wallace jokes that when he wears a tuxedo, he makes James Bond look like Cletus Spuckler from The Simpsons.
- Logan and Veronica both reference "Alone Again (Naturally)".

== Arc significance ==
Veronica learns that she has chlamydia. Keith helps Woody when he is found with a prostitute in his bed. Deputy Leo was hired to protect Gia, but Lucky was the actual stalker. He is about to tell Keith why he was stalking Gia and Woody, but Meg Manning's father bails him out before he can tell. Logan is about to kiss Veronica before she dashes off. Later that night, Logan sleeps with Kendall, and Veronica comes to apologize to him. When Veronica learned what Logan had done, she leaves in tears.

== Music ==
The following music can be heard in the episode:

- "Women's Wear" by Daniel May
- "Talk to Me" by Paul Taylor and Randi Soyland
- "I Hear the Bells" by Mike Doughty
- "All My Life" by DJ Harry

== Production ==
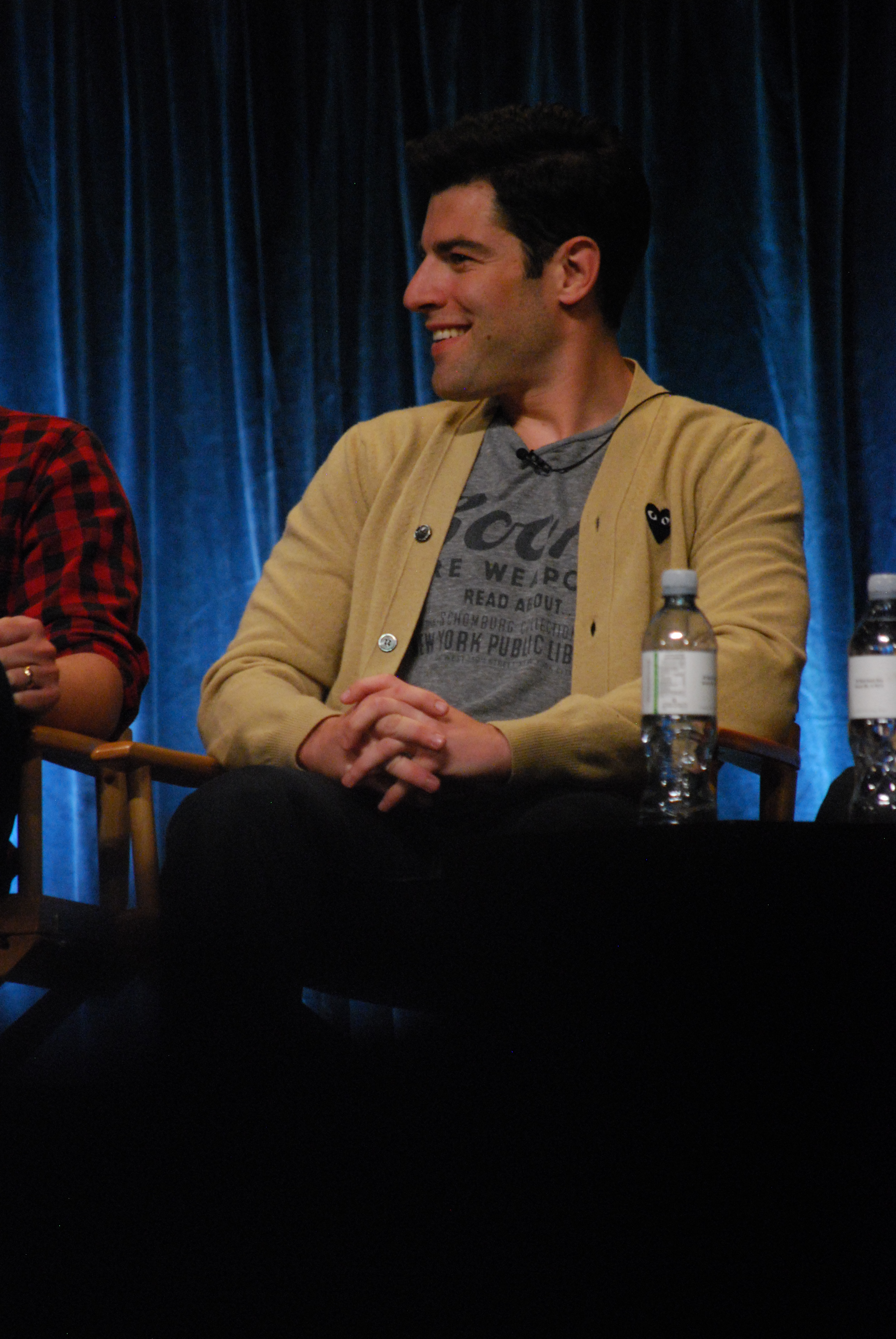
Max Greenfield guest starred in the episode.

The episode was written by John Enbom and directed by Michael Fields, marking Enbom's ninth writing credit for the show and Fields's fifth directing credit for the show. The episode was originally titled "See You Next Tuesday", before being changed to the final title of "Look Who's Stalking." In an interview, Krysten Ritter, who plays Gia Goodman, stated that she was "most proud of" her work in "Look Who's Stalking" out of the 8 episodes of the series in which she appeared. She elaborated that in this episode, "the writers gave me a lot of fun stuff to do." "Look Who's Stalking" also features an appearance from Max Greenfield, who portrays Leo D'Amato.

In addition, several important recurring characters of the second season appear in the episode, including Terrence Cook (Jeffrey Sams), Don Lamb (Michael Muhney), Cindy "Mac" Mackenzie (Tina Majorino), Kendall Casablancas (Charisma Carpenter), and Woody Goodman (Steve Guttenberg). The episode features one of the most famous lines of the show, a speech by Logan in which he tells Veronica, "I thought our story was epic, you and me." The speech would later be echoed by Veronica in the final moments of the 2014 film adaptation of the show. The episode's title references the 1989 romantic comedy film Look Who's Talking.

== Reception ==
=== Ratings ===
In its original broadcast, "Look Who's Stalking" received 1.85 million viewers, marking a small decrease from "Nevermind the Buttocks" and ranking 110th of 117 in the weekly rankings.

=== Reviews ===
The episode received mixed to positive reviews, with some praising and others criticizing the episode's perceived status as a set-up for the next episodes. Rowan Kaiser of The A.V. Club gave a mixed review, writing that "I don't want to say that "Look Who's Stalking" is a bad episode exactly, although it is frustratingly direct," commenting on how the episode mainly served to tie up loose plot ends. "The pieces are getting moved around here, and while I admire the narrative drive, it's hard not to see the manipulation." Reviewer Alan Sepinwall wrote that the episode made him "psyched for the conclusion." He also stated that "By making Woody's potential guilt such an in-your-face part of the hour, Rob and company have done one of two things: either Woody is yet another red herring or he is the bad guy and they're not going for some cheap, contrived "Gotcha!" in episode 22."

Television Without Pity gave the episode a "B−". Price Peterson, writing for TV.com, wrote that "the developments of this episode were strictly of the set-up variety, but "Look Who's Stalking" still managed to wring tons of tension out of its various situations. […] good episode, but I feel bad for anyone who had to wait a week for the next one."
