= Happy Go Lucky (Veronica Mars) =

- Veronica Mars episode
- Episode no.: Season 2 Episode 21
- Directed by: Steve Gomer
- Written by: Diane Ruggiero
- Production code: 2T7221
- Original air date: May 2, 2006

Guest appearances
- Harry Hamlin as Aaron Echolls; Jeffrey Sams as Terrence Cook; Michael Muhney as Don Lamb; Krysten Ritter as Gia Goodman; Tina Majorino as Cindy "Mac" Mackenzie; James Jordan as Tommy "Lucky" Dohanic; John Prosky as Ethan Lavoie; Gil Birmingham as Leonard Lobo; Steve Guttenberg as Woody Goodman

Episode chronology
← Previous "Look Who's Stalking"	Next → "Not Pictured"
- Veronica Mars season 2

"Happy Go Lucky" is the twenty-first and penultimate episode of the second season of the American mystery television series Veronica Mars, and the forty-third episode overall. Written by Diane Ruggiero and directed by Steve Gomer, the episode premiered on UPN on May 2, 2006.

The series depicts the adventures of Veronica Mars (Kristen Bell) as she deals with life as a high school student while moonlighting as a private detective. In this episode, Aaron Echolls (Harry Hamlin) is put on trial for the murder of Lilly Kane (Amanda Seyfried), and Veronica and Keith (Enrico Colantoni) have to testify. Meanwhile, the pair learn that Woody (Steve Guttenberg) is a child molester.

== Synopsis ==
Aaron Echolls testifies in court and lies (while under oath) about the day of the murder. Veronica talks to Keith about her testimony. Gia (Krysten Ritter) invites Veronica to her house, and she agrees. Veronica bemoans her academic situation to Jackie (Tessa Thompson) and Wallace (Percy Daggs III). Weevil (Francis Capra) asks Veronica for help on his finals, but she refuses, citing her own need to study for finals in order to win the Kane scholarship. Lucky (James Jordan) appears in the outdoor lunch area and starts shooting a gun. He points the gun at Jackie before "shooting" Wallace, although his gun has no live bullets, only blanks. A school security officer appears and actually shoots Lucky in the back. Woody answers the press's questions on the incident. Keith tells Veronica his plan to hack into Woody's email account, and Veronica says that she'll handle it when she's invited over. Logan visits Aaron in prison. At the Goodmans' house, Veronica hacks into the email account and reads an email with an attachment that indicates that Woody molested several children. Woody walks in on her and threatens her. Later, Keith deduces that one voice in the recording has been edited out.

Veronica testifies against Aaron Echolls in court, but Echolls' defense counsel successfully impeaches her testimony by bringing up Veronica's chlamydia. Casino boss Leonard Lobo tells Sheriff Lamb that he was with Terrence at the time of the accident. Beaver tries and fails to teach Weevil algebra before Mac takes over. Keith tells Woody to clear his house in response to a bomb threat and tells him his finding that Woody is a molester, but Woody threatens him. Terrence is released, but Leonard appears at his door and says that he fabricated his testimony in order to make Terrence indebted to him. Logan tells Veronica that Lucky once acted weirdly in response to his time as a batboy for the Sharks. Keith testifies in court, but his credibility is undermined when he grabs the defense attorney during cross-examination. Beaver and Mac continue their education of Weevil. Veronica learns that Lucky's Little League team was also called the Sharks and that two of the boys who died in the bus crash were on the team.

Woody's house is searched and a bomb is found under his car. Veronica and Keith present their theory that Woody is responsible for the bus disaster to Sheriff Lamb, but he counters by saying that Lucky probably did it and that they are trying to make him look bad. Logan gives a moving testimony against Aaron. Two little boys identify Weevil as Thumper's attacker. Keith tells Sheriff Lamb that Lucky was in a cell at a VA hospital at the time of the bus crash. Weevil passes his test, and Wallace finishes his final high school test. Jackie leaves for France, and Veronica skips a test to hear the Aaron Echolls verdict. Sheriff Lamb tells Keith that Woody left town the previous morning. Aaron Echolls is acquitted of all charges.

== Cultural references ==
The following cultural references are made in the episode:

- Aaron says that he was People's Sexiest Man Alive in 1987, when Harry Hamlin actually won.
- Lucky refers to Gia in a manner similar to an advertisement for Chia Pets.
- Keith refers to Post Office Protocol.
- Gia mentions her MySpace account.
- Veronica quotes a line from Waiting for Guffman.
- Veronica says "Elementary, my dear Wallace" in reference to Sherlock Holmes.

== Arc significance ==
- Woody Goodman is revealed to be a child molester.
- Lucky brings a gun (with blanks, not live bullets) into school before he is shot by a police officer.
- Aaron Echolls, with the help of his lawyers and popular support, is acquitted of the murder of Lilly Kane.

== Music ==
The following song can be heard in the episode:

- "Lost and Found" by Adrienne Pierce

== Production ==
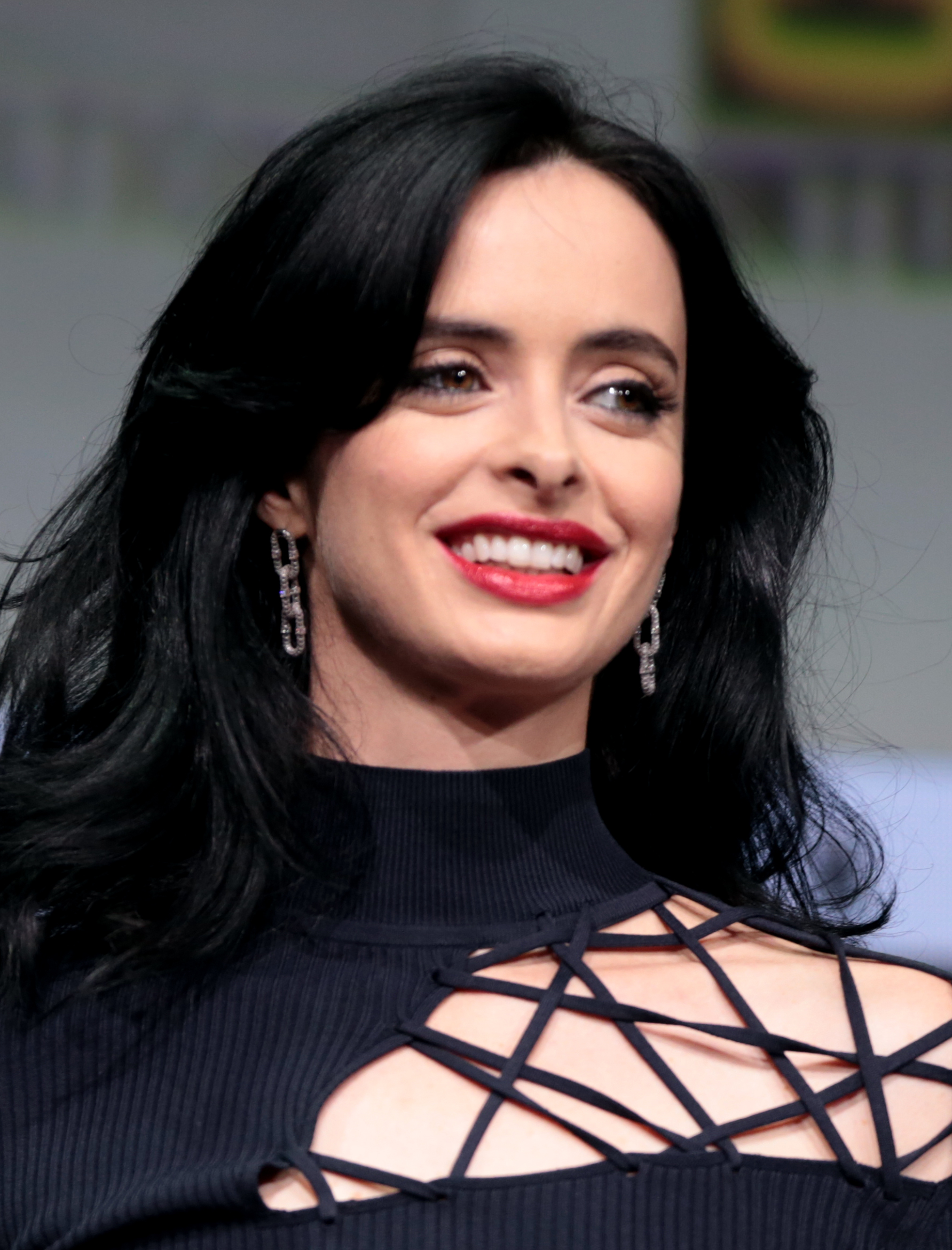
"Happy Go Lucky" marks Krysten Ritter's final appearance on the series.

"Happy Go Lucky" was written by Diane Ruggiero and directed by Steve Gomer, marking Ruggiero's twelfth writing credit and Gomer's third writing credit for the show (after "Lord of the Bling" and "Ahoy, Mateys!"). The episode was originally titled "Manning the Ship", despite the fact that it does not feature the Manning family, before being changed to the final title of "Happy Go Lucky." Despite being credited, Duncan (Teddy Dunn) and Dick (Ryan Hansen) do not appear in the episode. The episode features an appearance by Harry Hamlin as Aaron Echolls, the main antagonist of season 1, as well as appearances by important recurring characters such as Terrence Cook (Jeffrey Sams), Gia Goodman (Krysten Ritter) and Woody Goodman (Steve Guttenberg).

This would be Ritter's final appearance on the show. Ritter wanted to appear in the finale, "Not Pictured", but she was unable to do so because of scheduling conflicts. "It was unfortunate for me that I couldn't be in the finale episode (I booked a pilot) because I was looking forward to showing how everything that went down affected her. On a side note, I did start to think that I was responsible for the crash. I really wanted her to be a bad guy." She would later appear in the Veronica Mars movie.

== Reception ==
=== Ratings ===
In its original broadcast, the episode received 2.09 million viewers, ranking 112th of 120 in the weekly rankings.

=== Reviews ===
"Happy Go Lucky" received positive reviews. Price Peterson of TV.com gave a glowing review, writing that " 'Happy Go Lucky' also featured some truly touching moments, in particular Veronica and Wallace's heartfelt conversation about how much they'd miss each other next year. […] One of this show's biggest recurring themes was that no good deed went unpunished, so it was nice to see Veronica get at least a shred of credit for all the awesome things she'd done. Great moment in a great episode." Television Without Pity gave the episode a "B."

Rowan Kaiser, writing for The A.V. Club, gave a very positive review, writing that it was "serialization done right" and praising the characterization of Veronica. "But their character assassination of Veronica is more impressive, because it strikes at one of the show's core struggles: Veronica is special. Perhaps too special. As the audience of the show that bears her name, we understand her specialness. […] But there are times when Veronica is brought back to reality, reminded that the rest of her world doesn't see her as special."
