= Weevils Wobble But They Don't Go Down =

- Veronica Mars episode
- Episode no.: Season 3 Episode 19
- Directed by: Jason Bloom
- Written by: Phil Klemmer
- Production code: 3T5819
- Original air date: May 22, 2007
- Running time: 42 minutes

Guest appearances
- Ken Marino as Vinnie Van Lowe; Saige Thompson as Abigail Montgomery; Tangie Ambrose as Jalisa Jones; Patrick Fischler as Russell Marchant; Lauren Bowles as Karin Mackay; Michael B. Silver as Professor David Winkler; Dianna Agron as Jenny Budosh; Travis Van Winkle as Patrick Nickerson

Episode chronology
← Previous "I Know What You'll Do Next Summer"	Next → "The Bitch Is Back"
- Veronica Mars season 3

"Weevils Wobble But They Don't Go Down" is the nineteenth and penultimate episode of the third season of the American mystery television series Veronica Mars, and the 63rd episode overall. Written by Phil Klemmer and directed by Jason Bloom, the episode premiered on The CW on May 22, 2007. The series depicts the adventures of Veronica Mars (Kristen Bell) as she deals with life as a college student while moonlighting as a private detective.

In this episode, Weevil (Francis Capra) enlists Veronica's help in proving his innocence when he is implicated in creating fake student IDs. Meanwhile, Veronica and Piz (Chris Lowell) come to terms with Veronica's FBI internship, and a sex tape of the couple is released on the internet. Logan (Jason Dohring) beats up Piz, thinking that he posted it. In addition, Keith (Enrico Colantoni) and Vinnie (Ken Marino) debate on Piz's radio show about the upcoming Sheriff's election in which they are running against each other.

"Weevils Wobble But They Don't Go Down" features the reappearance of Weevil after an absence of five episodes; during filming of the third season, Capra was undergoing medical treatment. Series creator Rob Thomas pointed out Logan and Piz's fight scene as one of the highlights of the episode and the season. In its original broadcast, the episode received mostly positive reviews from television critics, with many praising the case-of-the-week.

== Synopsis ==
In a checkout line, Veronica and Mac (Tina Majorino) discuss her relationship with Piz and what her FBI internship will mean for them. They then see someone getting arrested by the campus police for a fake debit card. Weevil injures himself, but finds himself unable to receive adequate benefits. Veronica gets Piz to accept her leaving for the internship. At the Sheriff's station, Weevil is called out by several students as being the one who gave them the fake cards. Weevil is jailed, but he tells Veronica that he thinks they targeted him after he was showcased in the criminology class. She investigates several of the owners of the student IDs, who do seem genuine in accusing Weevil. Weevil gets bail, but Keith informs him that a student ID printing machine was found in the locker next to Weevil's. Veronica and Wallace speak to a mechanical engineering professor, who says that it would be impossible for Weevil to be the culprit. Piz invites Keith to appear on his show in an election special before Keith informs Veronica that Weevil's fingerprints were found all over the investigation.

Keith and Vinnie debate on Piz's radio show, and Vinnie gathers some support about his lax underage drinking policy. Wallace notices someone following him, and the student wants to recruit him for a secret society. Vinnie insults Keith's handling of his home life, and Veronica hits him on the head lightly. She helps Weevil retrace his steps and notices one of her criminology classmates, Jenny (Dianna Agron), involved with one of Weevil's clients. Veronica deduces that Jenny and her circle of friends are responsible for creating the fake student IDs, disseminating them, and implicating Weevil. Logan and Dick (Ryan Hansen) go surfing, and they run into Veronica, Piz, and Mac helping Wallace (Percy Daggs III) with his final project for a class. Veronica learns that one of Jenny's group lives in the same town in Georgia where the student ID machines are made.

Veronica is called into a room in the library by Jenny's group, who try to bribe her into not turning them in to the Hearst police. However, she refuses and records their conversation as further proof. They are hiding a third ID machine, and Veronica tells Weevil to go and find it. Dick shows Logan a sex tape of Piz and Veronica that has been circulating in an email. Because Logan thinks Piz posted the tape, he attacks Piz and they have a fistfight. Weevil finds the third student ID machine, but tells Veronica he didn't, and Logan walks into Mars Investigations with Piz's blood on him.

== Production ==
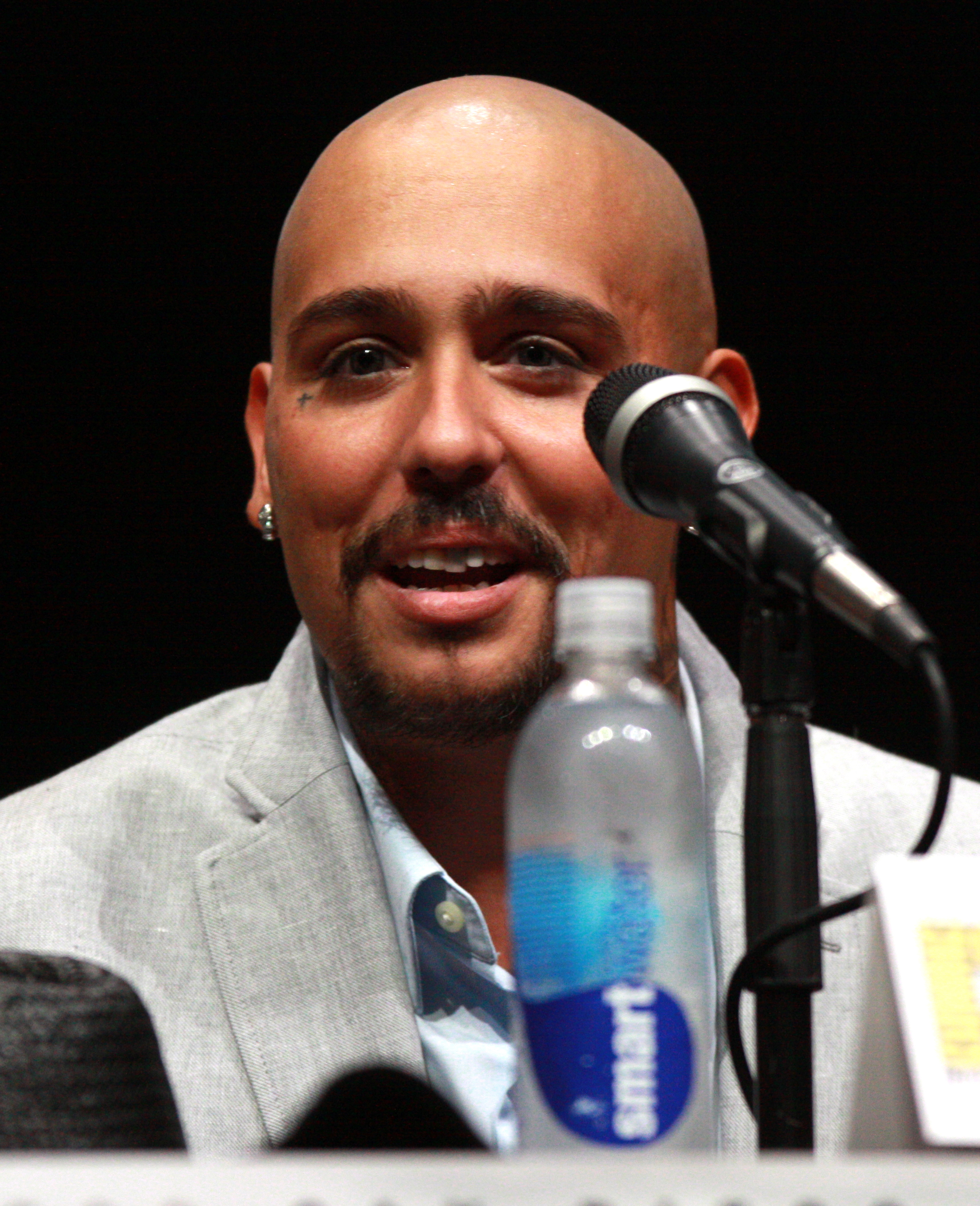
The episode prominently features series regular Francis Capra, who was experiencing health issues during filming.

"Weevils Wobble But They Don't Go Down" was written by Phil Klemmer and directed by Jason Bloom, marking Klemmer's fifteenth and final writing credit and Bloom's fourth and final directing credit for Veronica Mars, after "Green-Eyed Monster", "Nevermind the Buttocks", and "Charlie Don't Surf". The episode features the final appearance of Dianna Agron, famous for her role as Quinn Fabray on Glee, as Jenny Budosh, Veronica's classmate. Agron had previously appeared in the episode "President Evil". The episode prominently features Weevil (Francis Capra), who appears after a five episode hiatus. During the third season, Capra was struggling with a medical condition, and the medication he took for this illness caused his face and neck to swell and break out with acne.

Series creator Rob Thomas included the scene in which Logan attacks Piz on his list of highlights from the third season. When Thomas first viewed the scene with his wife, she emitted an audible groan when she saw Logan walking through the cafeteria towards Piz, anticipating the fight that was about to come. Thomas thought that most fight scenes on the show were not well-done, as they are filmed quickly and without a second unit. However, he was pleased with the final cut, stating that there was only one punch that he thought looked fake.

== Reception ==
=== Ratings ===
In its original broadcast, "Weevils Wobble But They Don't Go Down" received 1.78 million viewers, ranking 77th of 85 in the weekly rankings. This was a decrease from the previous episode, "I Know What You'll Do Next Summer", which garnered 2.10 million watchers.

=== Reviews ===
Eric Goldman, writing for IGN, graded the episode a 9.0 out of 10, indicating that it was "amazing". His very positive review focused on the ambiguous nature of the main plot and the subplots of Dick and Logan. He praised the presence of the majority of the main cast members, also stating that Dick's reaction to dealing with his brother was realistic for him and in character. The reviewer called the conclusion to the case-of-the-week a "fun and satisfying one" that highlighted the moral ambiguity of main characters, something "that the show had been lacking for a while." He highlighted this ambiguity in both Weevil and Logan, elaborating that Logan attacking Piz showed an interesting side to his personality that had not been present all season. The reviewer also lauded the cliffhanger ending, stating, "it was a reminder of how exciting and intense this show can be at its best." Television Without Pity did not grant the episode a rating but lauded the characterization of Weevil, stating, "This is the most consistently written character on the show, bar none."

Kelly West of Cinema Blend focused primarily on the series finale in her review but referred to this episode as containing a solid case-of-the-week. "Overall it was a good mystery-of-the-week but seeing as it was the second to last episode, the only thing I cared about was that we finally got more Weevil!" Rowan Kaiser of The A.V. Club gave the episode a mixed review, stating that the case-of-the-week was an oversimplification of the overall themes of Veronica Mars. The reviewer enjoyed the potential for Logan and Dick's character development, although she felt that it was blunted by the knowledge that the series was about to end. "As fun as this episode is, the lack of the fourth season stops me from fully enjoying it. […] But the knowledge that this might be the last time we see them puts a damper on things. Still, better to go out with good episodes than bad."
