= Not Pictured =

- Veronica Mars episode
- Episode no.: Season 2 Episode 22
- Directed by: John Kretchmer
- Story by: Rob Thomas
- Teleplay by: Rob Thomas; John Enbom
- Production code: 2T7222
- Original air date: May 9, 2006

Guest appearances
- Harry Hamlin as Aaron Echolls; Michael Muhney as Don Lamb; Tina Majorino as Cindy "Mac" Mackenzie; Ken Marino as Vinnie Van Lowe; Amanda Seyfried as Lilly Kane; Christopher B. Duncan as Clarence Wiedman; Corinne Bohrer as Lianne Mars; Jeremy Ray Valdez as Marcos Oliveres; Luke Frydenger as Peter Ferrer; Erica Gimpel as Alicia Fennel; Charisma Carpenter as Kendall Casablancas; Steve Guttenberg as Woody Goodman

Episode chronology
| ← Previous "Happy Go Lucky" | Next → "Welcome Wagon" |
- Veronica Mars season 2

"Not Pictured" is the second season finale of the American mystery television series Veronica Mars, serving as the twenty-second episode of the season and the forty-fourth episode overall. Co-written by series creator Rob Thomas and John Enbom and directed by John Kretchmer, the episode premiered on UPN on May 9, 2006. In this episode, Veronica learns the identity of the person responsible for the Neptune High bus crash. Meanwhile, Veronica and her classmates graduate from high school, and Neptune reacts to Aaron Echolls (Harry Hamlin) being acquitted.

"Not Pictured" reveals Cassidy "Beaver" Casablancas (Kyle Gallner) as the perpetrator behind the bus crash and Veronica's rape. This plot twist was planned since Beaver's introduction. The episode also features the final appearances of several characters, including Aaron Echolls, Beaver, Jackie Cook (Tessa Thompson), Duncan Kane (Teddy Dunn), and Woody Goodman (Steve Guttenberg). This episode would be the final episode of the show to air on UPN before switching to The CW. The finale was critically acclaimed and is often cited as one of the best of the series.

== Background ==
The second season revolves around a school bus that mysteriously goes off a cliff, killing eight people. Throughout the season, Veronica investigates the murder, focusing on a variety of suspects, including the Fitzpatrick family, Kendall Casablancas (Charisma Carpenter), and Terrence Cook (Jeffrey Sams) before turning her suspicion on Woody Goodman (Steve Guttenberg) after she learns that he is a child molester. "Not Pictured" solves the mystery through a plot twist. Meanwhile, Veronica previously dated Duncan Kane (Teddy Dunn), before he left with his baby daughter (whose mother was one of the bus crash victims) for Mexico. In addition, Aaron Echolls (Harry Hamlin), the murderer of Lilly Kane, Duncan's sister, was acquitted of all charges.

== Plot ==
After the Aaron Echolls trial, he is interviewed by press and cheering fans. Veronica tells Keith (Enrico Colantoni) that Meg's father has offered $20,000 for the capture of Woody. Veronica talks to Wallace (Percy Daggs III) about Jackie (Tessa Thompson) leaving. Keith visits Vinnie (Ken Marino) in prison, and they agree to track Woody down together. Veronica and Keith learn that Woody was treated for chlamydia. In a dream, Veronica shares a happy family breakfast before her graduation, meeting Wallace for the first time that day before seeing Lilly (Amanda Seyfried). Veronica makes a fake call as Gia to Woody's lawyer, and he reveals that Woody is staying at the Quail Creek Lodge under the name Mr. Underhill. At Veronica's graduation, Keith says that he's going to chase Woody, and Mac (Tina Majorino) tells Veronica that she is going to a hotel with Beaver that night. During the ceremony, Weevil (Francis Capra) is arrested by Lamb for the murder of Thumper just before he can graduate. Veronica graduates and says goodbye to Principal Clemmons (Duane Daniels).

Keith surprises Veronica with plane tickets to New York. Alicia Fennel (Erica Gimpel) tells Veronica that Wallace has left for Paris to track Jackie. Veronica calls Jackie and tells her that she knows she was never accepted to the Sorbonne and Jackie confesses that she moved back in with her mother in Brooklyn. Veronica asks her to meet Wallace at JFK, where he has a layover. At Woody's hiding place, Keith attacks and tasers him. However, Woody denies crashing the bus. Veronica sees a little league team picture in Woody's restaurant which suggests that Beaver was on Woody's baseball team and thus connected to the crash. Veronica races to the after-graduation party. Beaver is unable to have sex with Mac, and while she is in the shower, he reads a text from Veronica on Mac's cellphone, warning her that he's a killer. Beaver uses Mac's phone to lure Veronica to the roof. Aaron Echolls threatens Veronica in the elevator, where he privately admits to killing Lilly. On the roof, Beaver corners Veronica with a gun, and Veronica accuses him of crashing the bus to kill Marcos and Peter and prevent them from coming forward and revealing Woody molested the three of them. Beaver got explosives from David "Curly" Moran, and convinced the PCHers that Curly destroyed the bus before killing Curly himself, and writing 'VERONICA MARS' on his palm to misdirect the police.

Veronica also accuses Beaver of raping her during the night she was drugged. Woody had been treated for chlamydia, presumably transmitting it to Beaver who, in turn, transmitted it to Veronica. Beaver proceeds to blow up the plane that he tells Veronica is transporting both Woody and Keith. Beaver then tases Veronica, urging her to kill herself by jumping off the roof. Logan appears, having read the text Veronica forwarded, and Beaver starts shooting. Veronica and Logan are able to take Beaver's gun, Logan convinces Veronica not to kill Beaver, but Beaver commits suicide by jumping off the building instead of facing the consequences of his actions.

Aaron and Kendall (Charisma Carpenter) have sex in his hotel room, and while she is in the shower, Clarence Wiedman (Christopher B. Duncan) appears and shoots him in the head, killing him. It's revealed that Duncan organized the murder, and that he's hiding in Australia with his daughter. Jackie meets Wallace and explains to him that she had to go back to New York and waitressing, in order to care for her two-year-old son, whom she left with her mother, when she came to Neptune to reconnect with her father. Veronica is relieved to learn that Keith is alive, having never gotten on the plane. Kendall receives $8 million from Beaver's business. Veronica and Logan (Jason Dohring) rekindle their relationship. Kendall makes Keith a business proposal, and as a result, he misses their flight to New York.

== Production ==
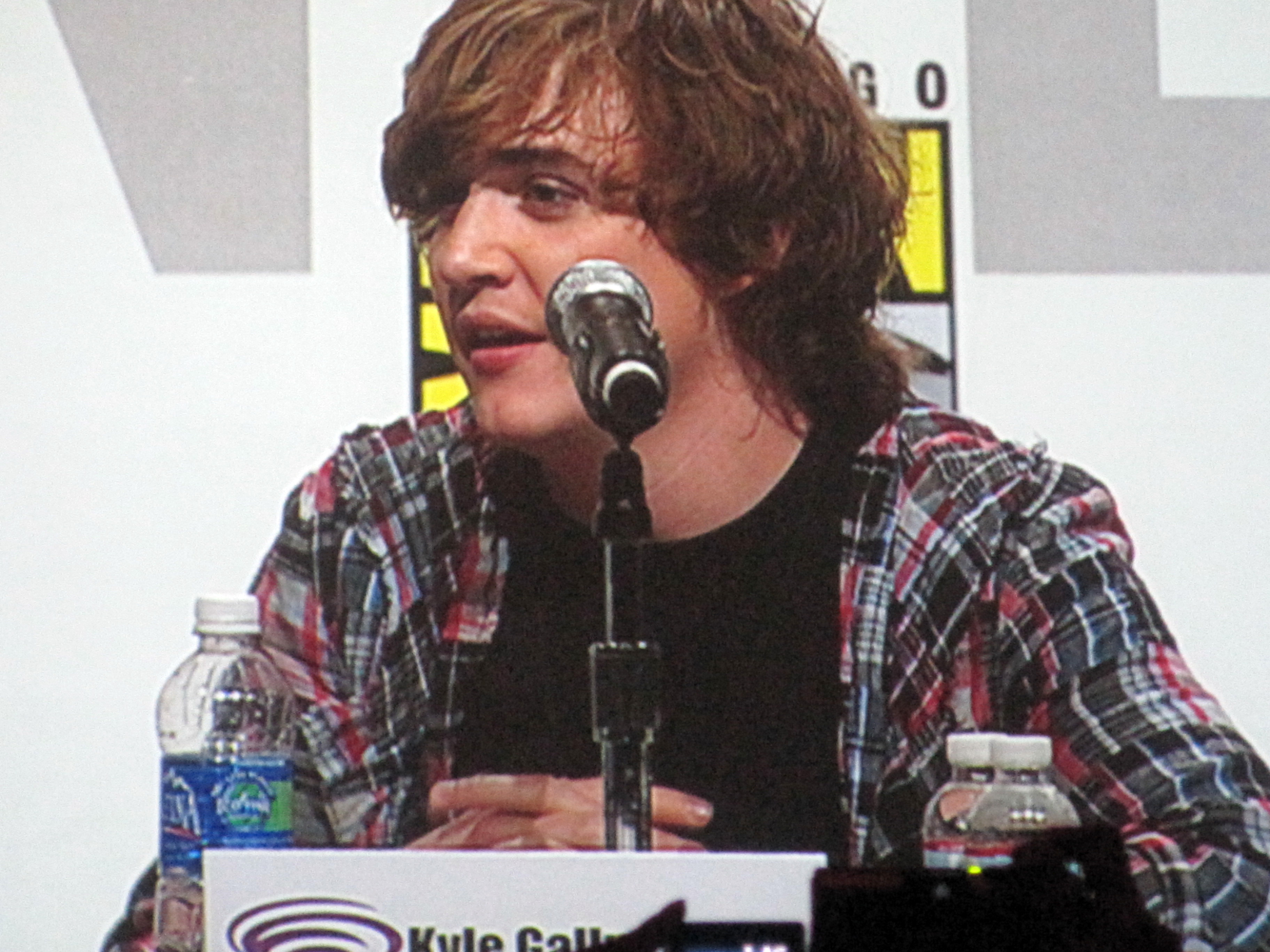
Series regular Kyle Gallner makes his final appearance in the episode.

The episode was co-written by Rob Thomas and John Enbom and directed by John T. Kretchmer, marking Thomas' sixth writing credit for Veronica Mars, Enbom's tenth writing credit for the series, and Kretchmer's ninth directing credit for the show. "Not Pictured" reveals Cassidy "Beaver" Casablancas as the perpetrator behind Veronica's rape and the bus crash. Thomas and the crew had planned for Beaver to be the second season antagonist since the character's first appearance in "M.A.D.". Thomas said, "We knew that Beaver was the killer of Season 2 when we introduced him in Season 1. We knew his motivation, so playing him as the picked-upon, less-manly Casablancas boy was all by design." An episode earlier in the series, titled "A Trip to the Dentist", supposedly revealed that Duncan had had sex with Veronica when they were both under the influence of drugs, a fact which is potentially negated by this episode. When writing the episode, Thomas and Diane Ruggiero did not plan for Beaver to be the actual rapist, with Thomas saying that "I wish I could claim that we were that clever."

Lead actress Kristen Bell, who deduced that Aaron Echolls was the killer in Season 1, was unable to figure out the identity of the murderer in Season 2. "You never, ever see the show keep the killer in the main titles," adding that the writers "think they're so smart…and they are!" Actor Michael Muhney, who plays Don Lamb, expressed some anxiety over the course of the season that he would be the killer. However, Bell played a prank on Muhney, telling him that she knew the killer was going to be Loretta Cancun, a minor character from the pilot. Bell said, "[Muhney] only believed me for like a day." Kyle Gallner, who plays Beaver, did not know that his character was going to be the murderer until just before the shooting of "Not Pictured", when one of the costume designers told him about the reveal:

I had no idea up until right before we shot the episode. They wouldn't tell me. The only reason I found out was the wardrobe guy had gotten the script and he was like "Do you wanna know?" and I was like "What?" and he kinda spilled the beans actually. So I had no idea. I thought it was more along the lines of I was younger than everybody so I wasn't going off to college. That's why I was only in one season, I didn't know it was because that whole thing was gonna happen. So I literally didn't know until probably about a week before.

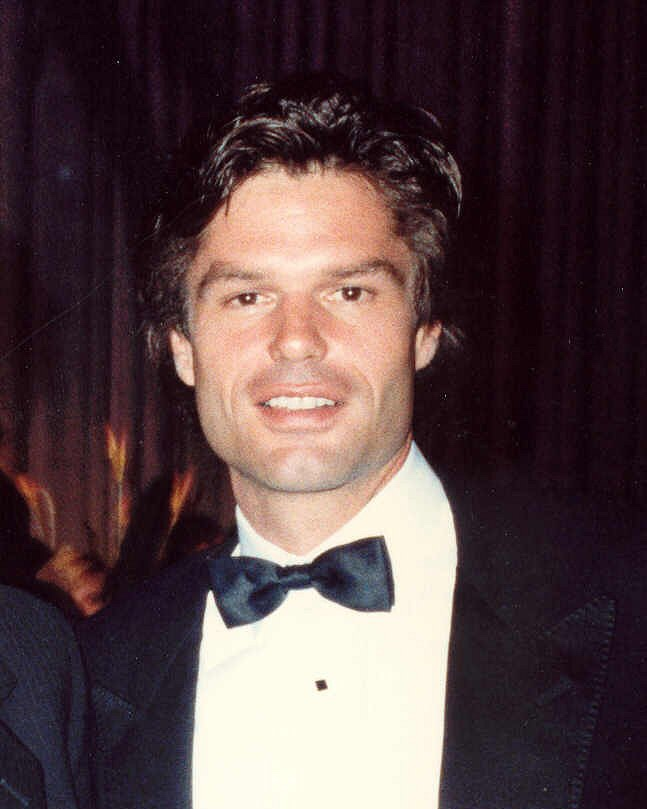
Harry Hamlin makes his final appearance of the series in "Not Pictured".

The episode also features the final appearance of Harry Hamlin as Season 1 antagonist Aaron Echolls after the character is murdered by Clarence Wiedman (Christopher B. Duncan). Later, we learn that the murder was ordered by Duncan Kane (Teddy Dunn), who appears briefly in a cameo. Dunn had made his final regular appearance in "Donut Run" and had left the show partly due to fan dislike of the character. Dunn later stated that he thought that the purpose of the cameo was to garner sympathy for the character before his final departure. "I think Rob's goal was to leave the character on a high note. I certainly think he did so in a heroic way."

"Not Pictured" would mark the final appearance by series regular Jackie Cook (Tessa Thompson). When asked whether Jackie was done with the show, Thomas replied, "She is. I would not hesitate for a second to have her come in to do an arc, but she will not be a series regular." One notable recurring character absence in the finale is that of Gia Goodman (Krysten Ritter). Ritter wanted to appear in the episode, but she was unable to do so because of scheduling conflicts. "It was unfortunate for me that I couldn't be in the finale episode (I booked a pilot) because I was looking forward to showing how everything that went down affected her. On a side note, I did start to think that I was responsible for the crash. I really wanted her to be a bad guy." She would later appear in the Veronica Mars movie.

"Not Pictured" was the final episode of Veronica Mars to air on UPN before the show switched to The CW as part of the 2006 United States broadcast TV realignment. Due to low ratings, there was considerable doubt that Veronica Mars would be renewed. Meanwhile, The CW had developed several new pilots. However, The CW did not pick up the majority of their pilots, making room on the schedule for other shows. In order to express their support for the show's renewal, fans flew a banner outside the offices of UPN and The CW.

Renewal was uncertain until after the finale aired. In April, actor Enrico Colantoni, who plays Keith, stated regarding renewal,

Unofficially, everyone at CBS and Warner Bros is saying, "Yeah, no worries!" But you know, those are always famous last words. And then last year they told us two days after we wrapped, and they got a lot of criticism over that. So I know they're not gonna make that mistake again. They're gonna wait until May.

Colantoni also expressed optimism towards the show's future on The CW, believing that it would be a chance for the show to get more exposure. On May 15, before the official press release was announced, it was believed that The CW had ordered 13 episodes of Veronica Mars. Later, it was revealed that the series had been renewed for a 22-episode season, but that the season could be shortened if ratings were poor.

== Reception ==
=== Ratings ===
In its original broadcast, "Not Pictured" received 2.42 million viewers, ranking 98th of 109 in the weekly rankings. This marked a decrease in viewers from the second season premiere, "Normal Is the Watchword", which received 3.29 million viewers and the first season finale, "Leave It to Beaver", which received 2.99 million viewers.

=== Reviews ===
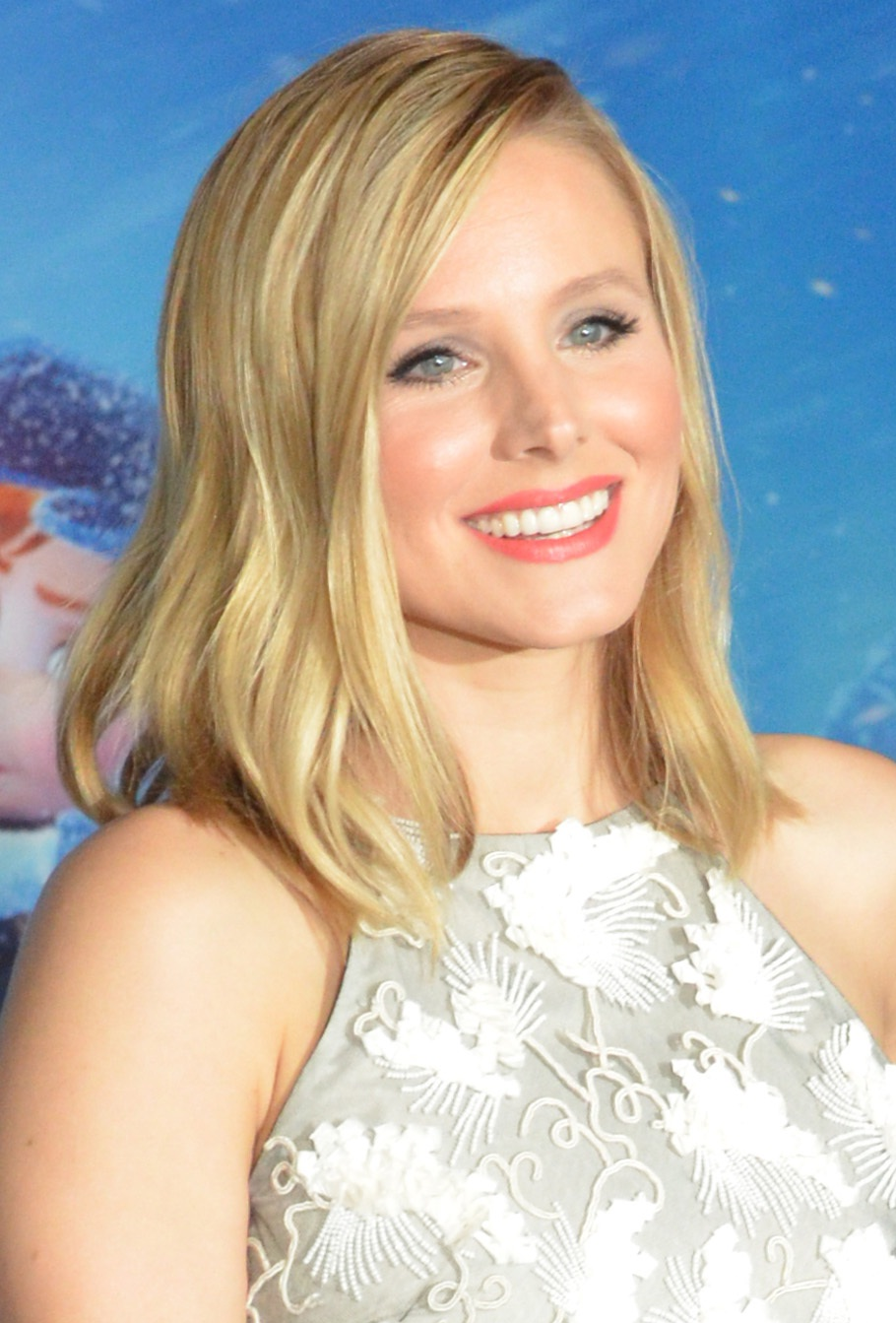
Kristen Bell's performance in the episode was praised by critics.

The episode was critically acclaimed. Jesse Hassenger of PopMatters wrote that "the season finale showcased the series at its surprising and funny best, not its rushed and convoluted worst." He called the reversal of the rape plot line a "gimmicky reversal" but that "thematically it worked." The reviewer commented positively on the reveal of Beaver as the murderer as well as the cliffhanger. "The season's low-key but effective cliffhanger…suggested again that her life, however charmed and TV-ish it can seem, remains in youthful flux."

Eric Goldman of IGN gave a glowing review, giving the episode a 9 out of 10, indicating that it was "amazing". He wrote that "most of the major mysteries established this season are given a satisfying and proper conclusion." He praised how the episode combined all the second season storylines, including the mysteries and the Neptune High portion of Veronica's life. "The final scenes do a very nice job of closing the high school chapter of the Veronica Mars story, while also leaving plenty of questions about the future of some characters in particular." Goldman also lauded the performances of Kristen Bell and Enrico Colantoni, writing that "As always, Kristen Bell and Enrico Colantoni knock it out of the park, with Bell especially having to go through a rather stunning amount of emotional transitions, all of which she does spectacularly."

In a review of the whole second season, Goldman wrote that there were "some complaints that the season finale was a bit too rushed, with a lot of information offered all at once. Yet while that's a bit valid, it's also an exciting and surprising finale, that actually offers some bigger shocks than season 1." Rowan Kaiser of The A.V. Club gave a mostly positive review, praising the reveal of Beaver as the murderer while being slightly critical of his reveal as Veronica's rapist. He wrote that "as twists go, this was a good one" and that "Kyle Gallner makes the transition from goofy, kind of pathetic little brother to insane mastermind quite well—the circles under his eyes, specifically, which seemed to indicate anxiety before suddenly indicated darkness and insanity when seen in a new light." Regarding the rape reveal, the reviewers wrote that "On a narrative level, I was fine with it...it's still a big problem in an emotional sense. In general, rape is a difficult subject, and to see it used as a plot device creates problems on its own." Kaiser summed up her review by writing, "'Not Pictured' acts as an effective capstone for a chaotic season. Sure, it doesn't entirely work, but overall, it gets the job done with emotion and flair."

Price Peterson, writing for TV.com, gave a glowing review, calling it "the best-yet episode of Veronica Mars". He elaborated by stating,

This episode was just a total triumph for how it brought together SO MUCH from the past 22 episodes and beyond. I loved the Aaron Echolls assassination. I loved that last image of Duncan enjoying his victory in a perpetual magic hour on some Australian beach. I especially loved the It's a Wonderful Life-esque dream sequence. This episode was so good that even though I knew Beaver was the bad guy, I still came away shocked by many of the reveals. That's just good writing right there.

Conversely, Television Without Pity gave the episode a "B+".

Amy Ratcliffe, writing for IGN, ranked the episode as the fifth best episode of Veronica Mars, writing, "the Season 2 finale had head-twisting reveals, heartbreaking moments…tragedy, and so many jumps in crime-solving that Sherlock might not have been able to keep up." BuzzFeed called the episode the best episode of the series, stating, "It's extremely violent, extremely scary, and extremely moving. If you don't cry watching this episode, there's a tiny little rock where your heart should be." On a similar list, TVLine ranked the episode third, only behind "A Trip to the Dentist" and "Pilot". Give Me My Remote also ranked the episode as the best of the series, writing, "If I had to pick a single episode to represent the show, this would be it. The actual plot of this episode was compelling, fast-paced, and the twist at the end was shocking." The reviewer went on to praise Kristen Bell's performance and the less action-heavy parts of the episode.

Digital Spy listed the episode on an unranked list of the five best Veronica Mars episodes, writing that it "has its issues" but that "the rooftop sequence with Veronica, Cassidy (Kyle Gallner) and Logan is pure, gorgeous melodrama, and Keith's fake-out death feels devastating instead of cheap thanks to Kristen Bell's gut-wrenching performance." In a list of the 50 greatest TV shows of all time, Empire noted "Not Pictured" as the best episode of the series. Reviewer Alan Sepinwall wrote that he was "very pleased with how things turned out" and that the twist fit with the evidence. However, he was more critical of Keith's near-death, writing, "What did feel like piling on, however, was Beaver 'killing' Keith. Kristen Bell tried her best to sell it, but I wasn't buying." Entertainment Weekly called the episode one of the "10 Essential Episodes" of Veronica Mars.
