= Welcome Wagon (Veronica Mars) =

- Veronica Mars episode
- Episode no.: Season 3 Episode 1
- Directed by: John Kretchmer
- Written by: Rob Thomas
- Production code: 3T5801
- Original air date: October 3, 2006

Guest appearances
- Ken Marino as Vincent Van Lowe; Patrick Fabian as Professor Hank Landry; James Jordan as Timothy Foyle; Andrew McClain as Moe Flater; Jason Beghe as Cormac Fitzpatrick; Josh Harto as Donald Fagan; Charisma Carpenter as Kendall Casablancas

Episode chronology
← Previous "Not Pictured"	Next → "My Big Fat Greek Rush Week"
- Veronica Mars season 3

"Welcome Wagon" is the season premiere of the third season of the American mystery television series Veronica Mars, and the forty-fifth episode overall. Written by series creator Rob Thomas and directed by John T. Kretchmer, the episode premiered on The CW on October 3, 2006. The series depicts the adventures of Veronica Mars (Kristen Bell) as she deals with life as a college student while moonlighting as a private detective.

In this episode, Veronica transitions to life at Hearst College, meeting several new people and reconnecting with several acquaintances from Neptune High. Meanwhile, a student named Piz (Chris Lowell) gets his belongings stolen, and Veronica helps him. In addition, Keith (Enrico Colantoni) trails Kendall Casablancas (Charisma Carpenter) in the aftermath of receiving a large sum of money from her in "Not Pictured" before learning that she is actually a target of the Fitzpatricks. At the end of the episode, one of Veronica's newfound friends, Parker Lee (Julie Gonzalo) becomes the next victim of the Hearst serial rapist.

"Welcome Wagon" is the first episode of Veronica Mars to air on The CW as opposed to UPN. In order to attract new viewers, Thomas and the crew decided to make several changes to the show, including altering the theme song and the show's narrative structure, beginning with this episode. In contrast to previous seasons, which involved one major season-long mystery, the show's writers planned to have three consecutive mysteries play out over the course of the third season.

The episode also sees the introduction of series regulars Stosh "Piz" Piznarski and Parker Lee as well as the promotion of Cindy "Mac" Mackenzie and Don Lamb to series regular status. Upon airing, the episode received 3.36 million viewers and received mixed to positive reviews. Eric Goldman of IGN thought that the episode "proves that the show is as clever and witty as ever", while Rowan Kaiser of The A.V. Club was critical of the show's increasing focus on rape.

== Plot synopsis ==
Veronica attends her criminology class at Hearst College, where she is now a freshman. Veronica solves a mystery given out in the class in six minutes, where the previous record was sixteen. Logan (Jason Dohring), who is also at Hearst, is still dating Veronica. Dick (Ryan Hansen) has just returned, getting into Hearst, but he is shaken up from Beaver's suicide. Vinnie (Ken Marino) approaches Keith (Enrico Colantoni) with a case, but he refuses it. Keith is tracking a bail-jumper. Stosh "Piz" Piznarski (Chris Lowell) becomes Wallace's (Percy Daggs III) roommate, and Piz loses all his belongings. Veronica comes in to help. Keith's bail-jumper, Cormac Fitzpatrick (Jason Beghe) is found, and he gets into the car with Keith. Veronica and Mac listen to a rape victim protesting the university's policies on the issue. Soon, Dick crashes the rally. Keith tells Cormac that he helped Kendall (Charisma Carpenter) get out of town, and Cormac is being targeted by the Fitzpatricks. Veronica and Piz visit the police department, and they say there have been other victims. Veronica learns that the Hearst "Welcome Wagon" is actually fake.

Veronica meets Mac's roommate, Parker Lee (Julie Gonzalo), who annoys both Veronica and Mac. Veronica, Parker, Mac, Wallace, and Piz go to a concert. Veronica talks about Piz's problem at the concert, and three kids say that they saw a white girl who was faking being fat. Dick shows up at Mac's door and tells her that Beaver never cared about her. Veronica finds an online listing for Piz's guitar, and they visit the seller. The seller's description matches that of other people. Veronica talks to Piz about a suspect, but he says that it doesn't match the woman he saw. Keith and Cormac's car gets stranded. Veronica signs up for the mentoring program in criminology class, and she notices that all three of the kids from the concert have a criminal record and are part of the program. The seller was their mentor, and the Welcome Wagon girl, his wife. Dick gets beaten up when he talks to another man's girlfriend, but Logan tases the man.

Piz asks Veronica if Logan is her boyfriend. Keith and the bail-jumper go to Kendall's house, and Kendall is romantically involved with Cormac. They have dinner, but Keith learns that Vinnie is working for Liam Fitzpatrick. When Keith returns, it is too late—Cormac has already killed Kendall and leaves Keith for dead in the cold night air. A disheveled Dick shows up at Logan's door and cries. Veronica sleeps on Mac's couch one night, and the next morning, they awaken to find that Parker has been raped, her head shaved.

== Production ==
=== Development ===
"Welcome Wagon" is the first episode of the series to air on The CW as opposed to UPN. Paul Maguire, the spokesman for The CW, said that the series was picked up because "the critics are behind it and our research has consistently shown that Gilmore shared more audience commonality with Veronica than with any other show from UPN, except Top Model". Veronica Mars was placed on Tuesdays after Gilmore Girls, with the network hoping for the Gilmore Girls audience to stay tuned for Veronica Mars. Thomas stated that The CW had requested some changes to the show to fit in better with the Gilmore Girls audience: "The network really wants us to be a good companion piece to Gilmore Girls. They've had a couple of thoughts on storylines that are too dark." "Welcome Wagon" also introduces a new title sequence for the show. The visuals of the theme song are different, and although "We Used to Be Friends" by The Dandy Warhols was still employed as the theme song, a remix was used instead of the original. Regarding the changes, Thomas elaborated:

Alright, the main titles. Why the change? As you'll see here, the previous titles were such a high school aesthetic. It would have felt silly for me to go back to college with the same sort of look—the notebook paper. So it felt like we needed to change for college anyway. And in season one when we first did the titles, the network was very clear on wanting to sell it as a high school show rather than a noir show. But once we went to college and had a chance to redo the titles I wanted it to feel noir.

For the new theme song, Thomas asked The Dandy Warhols to produce a remix of their original track, which Thomas reported enjoying upon first listening.

Thomas and the crew also introduced several narrative changes to the show starting in the third season. Thomas wanted to "invite new viewers to the show" by "trying to start with a clean slate" and ridding the show of references to former plotlines and character development. With regards to "Welcome Wagon", Thomas stated that he "wanted episode one this year to not rely much on past knowledge." He also tried to make the episode "very sort of breezy, and chattery and funny." The episode reintroduces the case of the Hearst serial rapist, a storyline presented in a second-season episode. In contrast to the previous seasons, which had several concurrent mysteries, Thomas planned for season 3 to have three consecutive mysteries, the first of which would be the serial rapist. "To service a 22-episode mystery, you have to have a large playing field. To service a 9-episode mystery, we can keep that tighter, more focused." It was made available on MSN for the week leading up to broadcast. However, the episode was only available for Microsoft users and not for Apple users.

=== Writing ===
"Welcome Wagon" was written by series creator Rob Thomas and directed by John T. Kretchmer, marking Thomas's seventh writing credit for the series and Kretchmer's tenth directing credit for the show. The episode was streamed on MSN on September 26, 2006, a week before its broadcast on The CW. "Welcome Wagon" features the final appearance by Charisma Carpenter as Kendall Casablancas, who appeared on a total of 11 episodes on the show. The previous summer, when asked about her role in season 3, Carpenter responded that she would be performing "a little more of the same, with a really, really interesting twist. And it starts the first episode; you've got to watch it. You miss the first episode, you're out of the loop. Gotta tune in right away."

=== Casting ===
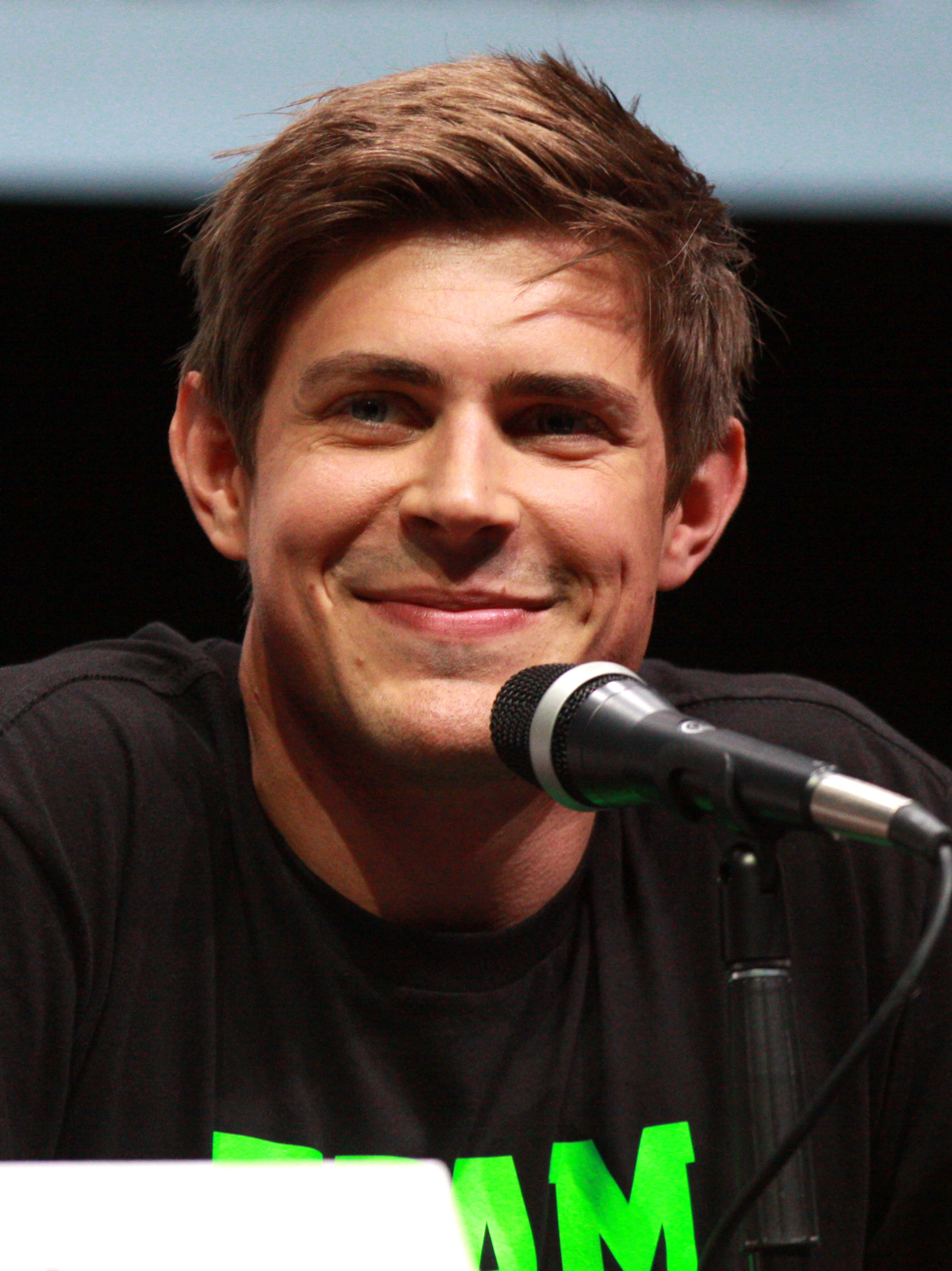
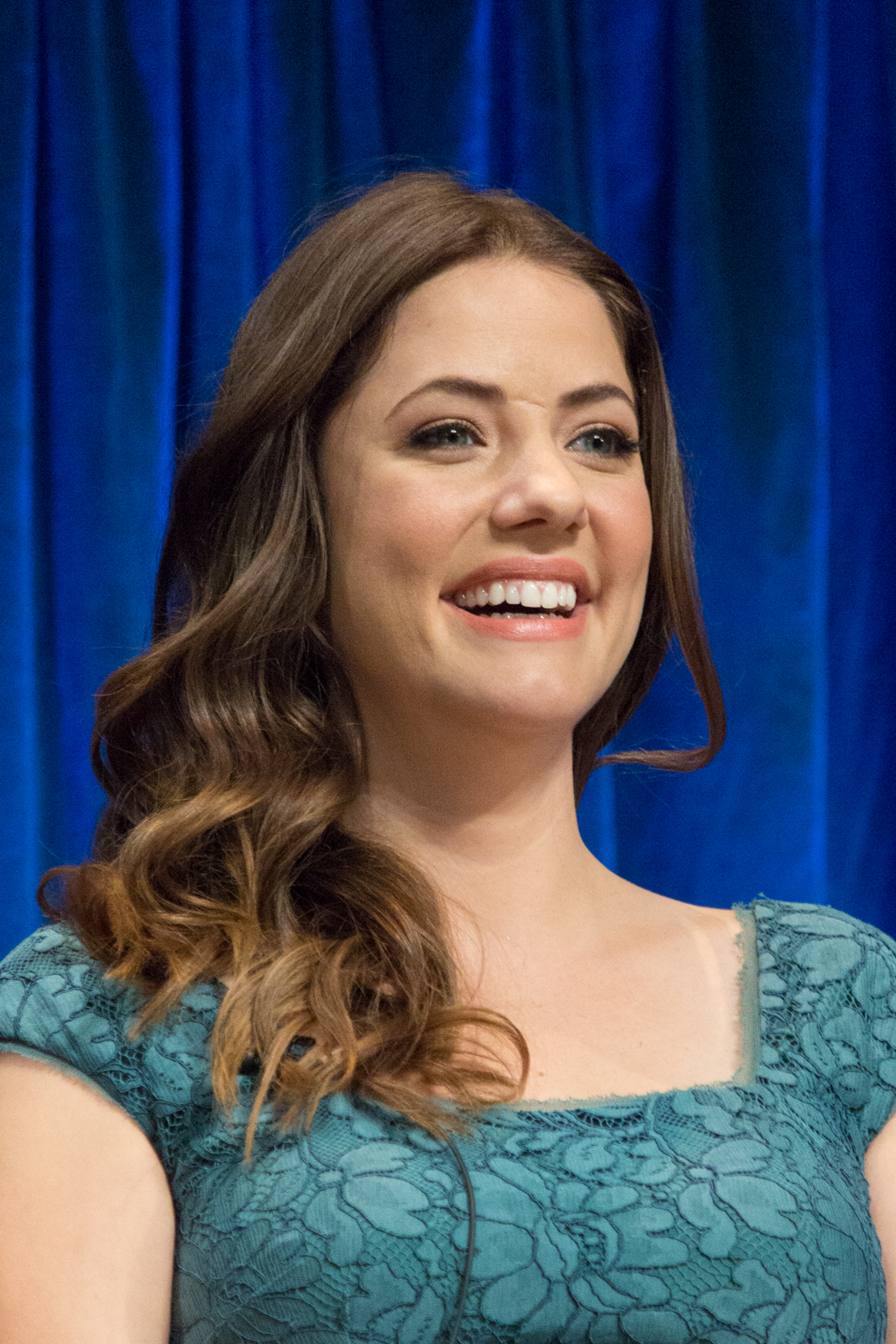
"Welcome Wagon" introduces two series regulars to the show—Stosh "Piz" Piznarski (Chris Lowell), left) and Parker Lee (Julie Gonzalo, right).

"Welcome Wagon" sees the promotion of four actors to star billing, two of whom, Cindy "Mac" Mackenzie (Tina Majorino) and Don Lamb (Michael Muhney), had previously served as recurring characters, and two of whom, Stosh "Piz" Piznarski (Chris Lowell) and Parker Lee (Julie Gonzalo) make their first appearance in the episode. Thomas revealed that Majorino was going to be a series regular the previous summer, a move that pleased many fans. Asked by Michael Ausiello whether Veronica and Mac would be roommates, Thomas replied that they would not, citing that such a living arrangement would prevent Veronica from having scenes with Keith. Nevertheless, Majorino commented that Mac and Veronica's relationship would continue to be close throughout the season. "The friendship with Veronica is one of my favorite parts of the entire show. It's great to have two really strong personalities getting along so well."

Muhney was told that he would be a series regular in season 3 the previous February, only a few days after his wedding. Muhney was very pleased to be a series regular, comparing his status to becoming a family member in the show rather than "someone who comes over for dinner occasionally." Piz (Chris Lowell) was named after the director of the show's pilot episode, Mark Piznarski. He was created in order to give Veronica a male friend who was not upper class. Thomas called Piz a "Lloyd Dobler mold" and "a middle-class kid from a Portland suburb who has too many words coming out of his mouth most of the time."

Parker Lee serves as Mac's roommate, with Thomas calling her "everything that Mac is not." Thomas also said that the character was not created or introduced in a reaction to negative fan opinion towards second season character Jackie Cook (Tessa Thompson). The episode features the first appearance of teaching assistant Tim Foyle (James Jordan; Jordan previously played another character, Lucky, in season 2). In addition, "Welcome Wagon" is the first appearance of the character of Moe Flater. Originally, Michael Cera, who guest starred in "The Rapes of Graff", was going to play a similar role, but the role of Moe Flater was created after Cera couldn't take the role due to scheduling conflicts.

== Reception ==
In its original broadcast, "Welcome Wagon" received 3.36 million viewers, ranking 82nd of 91 in the weekly rankings. This was an increase from both "Normal Is the Watchword", the second-season premiere, which received 3.29 million viewers and the second-season finale, "Not Pictured", which garnered 2.42 million viewers.

The episode received mixed to positive reviews. Eric Goldman of IGN gave the episode an 8 out of 10, indicating that it was "great." He wrote that although "Welcome Wagon" was designed to appeal to new viewers, that it was still a good episode. "'Welcome Wagon', written by Thomas, proves the show is as clever and witty as ever. […] The more exposition-heavy aspects of the premiere mean the episode isn't a true standout for the series, but that's understandable, given what it's trying to accomplish." He went on to state that the episode featured more "lighthearted" content before what he predicted would be a return to more dramatic elements. Price Peterson, writing for TV.com, gave a positive review, stating, "Great first episode back…There was a lot to accomplish in setting up the new environment and characters, but it still felt really organic to the series as a whole." While criticizing the fact that the rape victims experienced a backlash against them, he enjoyed the characterization of Piz.

Rowan Kaiser, of The A.V. Club, gave a mixed review of the episode, commenting on the show's increasing focus on rape. She wrote that "There are things that I appreciate about the focus on rape. […] It's fairly rare for a show to treat rape from the victim's perspective." However, she went on to state that she had "pretty significant issues" with the subject matter as well. She also disapproved of the killer's choice of victims, setting, and new characters, especially Piz. Television Without Pity gave the episode a "B". Reviewer Alan Sepinwall was fairly positive towards the episode. He was mixed towards the inclusion of the Kendall-Keith-Cormac storyline in the premiere, but he also praised the new cast members: "Piz and Parker both add new colors to the gang, though it's hard to say what Parker will be like post-rape." He eventually called the episode a "pretty good start".
