= Armchair Expert =

Comedy podcast

- Genre: Comedy, Interview
- Language: English

Cast and voices
- Hosted by: Dax Shepard; Monica Padman

Production
- Length: 120 minutes

Publication
- No. of episodes: 381
- Original release: February 6, 2018
- Provider: Spotify (2021–August 2024); Wondery (September 2024-present)

Related
- Website: armchairexpertpod.com

Armchair Expert is a weekly podcast hosted by American actors Dax Shepard and Monica Padman. Each podcast features Shepard and Padman interviewing celebrities, journalists, and academics about "the messiness of being human". The podcast premiered February 14, 2018, with Shepard's wife, actress Kristen Bell, as the first guest. It appeared on Vulture's list of 2018's best comedy podcasts and was reviewed by The Irish Times. Shepard and Padman have also taken their podcast on the road, recording episodes in front of live audiences.

== History ==
Armchair Expert was launched "on a lark" after Shepard had positive experiences as a guest on other podcasts, appreciating the length of time the format allowed compared to the typical brief segment on a talk show. It was the most downloaded new podcast of 2018 on iTunes. Shepard's goal is to give people the "experience of an AA meeting without them having to become a drunk". He states that he is qualified to host a podcast from his "decade of sobriety, degree in Anthropology, and four years of improv training." Podcasts are recorded in Shepard's guest house attic, and released on Mondays and Wednesdays. Shepard is assisted by co-host Monica Padman, who "fact checks" him at the end of each episode from a different perspective. The episodes typically run two hours in length.

In 2020, Forbes named Armchair Expert the fourth highest-earning podcast in the United States, estimating its earnings that year at $9 million, with a monthly audience of 20 million people. On May 12, 2021, Armchair Expert announced on Instagram that the podcast would be available exclusively on Spotify beginning July 1, saying they would continue to maintain the same creative control over the show after the move. On June 18, 2021, on Jimmy Kimmel Live!, Shepard and Padman revealed that former President Barack Obama would be their first guest once the podcast moves to Spotify.

In July 2024, the podcast announced they have signed a distribution and ad sales deal with Amazon's Wondery.

Throughout the years, Armchair Expert with Dax Shepard has included several other programs underneath the Armchair Umbrella. Rob Holysz is the co-creator and producer of Armchair Expert with Dax Shepard along with all additional Armchair Umbrella shows. A current show underneath the Armchair Umbrella is Armchair Anonymous with Dax Shepard and Monica Padman. Previous shows include Flightless Bird with New Zealander David Farrier and Synced with Monica Padman and Liz Plank.

== Episodes ==
=== 2018 episodes ===
No.	Title	Run Time	Original release date
1	"Introducing: Armchair Expert with Dax Shepard"	3:00	February 6, 2018
2	"Kristen Bell"	2:01:00	February 14, 2018
3	"Ashton Kutcher"	2:05:00	February 14, 2018
4	"Joy Bryant"	2:14:00	February 14, 2018
5	"Jimmy Kimmel"	1:59:00	February 19, 2018
6	"Pete Wentz"	2:12:00	February 26, 2018
7	"Adam Scott"	1:46:00	March 5, 2018
8	"Ellen DeGeneres"	54:00	March 12, 2018
9	"Van Hunt"	2:11:00	March 19, 2018
10	"Anna Faris"	1:52:00	March 26, 2018
11	"Zach Braff"	2:11:00	April 2, 2018
12	"Lauren Graham"	1:52:00	April 9, 2018
13	"Katie Couric"	2:06:00	April 16, 2018
14	"Seth Green"	1:45:00	April 23, 2018
15	"Chris Hardwick"	1:52:00	April 30, 2018
16	"Joel McHale"	1:29:00	May 7, 2018
17	"Bob Mervak"	1:56:00	May 14, 2018
18	"Marc Maron"	1:20:00	May 21, 2018
19	"Johnny Knoxville"	1:45:00	May 28, 2018
20	"Erika Christensen"	2:14:00	June 4, 2018
21	"Experts on Expert: Wendy Mogel"	2:01:00	June 7, 2018
22	"Talib Kweli"	2:54:00	June 11, 2018
23	"Kaitlin Olson"	2:01:00	June 18, 2018
24	"Mae Whitman"	2:16:00	June 25, 2018
25	"Dax's Mom (Laura Labo)"	2:39:00	July 2, 2018
26	"Portugal. The Man (John Gourley & Zachary Carothers)"	2:01:00	July 9, 2018
27	"Experts on Expert: David Sedaris"	1:58:00	July 12, 2018
28	"Nick Kroll"	2:18:00	July 16, 2018
29	"Mila Kunis"	2:40:00	July 23, 2018
30	"David Harbour"	2:51:00	July 30, 2018
31	"Experts on Expert: Jon Favreau"	2:00:00	August 2, 2018
32	"Vincent D'Onofrio"	2:08:00	August 6, 2018
33	"Seth Rogen"	2:27:00	August 13, 2018
34	"Colin Hanks & Allison Tolman"	2:54:00	August 20, 2018
35	"Jason Bateman"	2:19:00	August 27, 2018
36	"Matthew Lillard"	2:18:00	September 3, 2018
37	"Experts on Expert: Keith Morrison"	2:05:00	September 6, 2018
38	"Kathryn Hahn"	2:46:00	September 10, 2018
39	"Ike Barinholtz"	2:14:00	September 17, 2018
40	"The Good Place Week: Ted Danson"	2:08:00	September 24, 2018
41	"The Good Place Week: D'Arcy Carden"	1:48:00	September 25, 2018
42	"The Good Place Week: Mike Schur"	1:59:00	September 26, 2018
43	"The Good Place Week: Kristen Bell"	1:52:00	September 27, 2018
44	"Wendi McLendon-Covey"	1:55:00	October 1, 2018
45	"Experts on Expert: Yuval Noah Harari"	1:20:00	October 4, 2018
46	"Seth Meyers"	1:24:00	October 8, 2018
47	"LIVE: Jason Ritter"	1:59:00	October 11, 2018
48	"Amy Schumer"	1:39:00	October 15, 2018
49	"Experts on Expert: Dr. Drew"	2:21:00	October 18, 2018
50	"Rob McElhenney"	2:23:00	October 22, 2018
51	"LIVE: Brené Brown"	1:58:00	October 25, 2018
52	"Lena Dunham"	2:03:00	October 29, 2018
53	"Mark Duplass"	2:00:00	November 5, 2018
54	"Experts on Expert: Jerry Buting"	1:56:00	November 8, 2018
55	"Ira Glass"	1:59:00	November 12, 2018
56	"LIVE: Gordon Keith"	1:53:00	November 15, 2018
57	"Debby Ryan"	2:12:00	November 19, 2018
58	"Experts on Expert: Sam Harris"	2:37:00	November 22, 2018
59	"Conan O'Brien"	2:00:00	November 26, 2018
60	"LIVE: Ethan Hawke & Vincent D'Onofrio"	1:44:00	November 29, 2018
61	"Andrea Savage"	2:06:99	December 3, 2018
62	"Experts on Expert: Jonathan Haidt"	2:09:00	December 6, 2018
63	"Sophia Bush"	1:48:00	December 10, 2018
64	"LIVE: Jason Biggs"	2:01:00	December 13, 2018
65	"Sean Hayes"	1:59:00	December 17, 2018
66	"Josh Duhamel"	1:34:00	December 20, 2018
67	"Armchair Expert Holiday Spectacular"	1:28:00	December 24, 2018

=== 2019 episodes ===
No.	Title	Run Time	Original release date
68	"Josh Hutcherson"	2:18:00	January 7, 2019
69	"Experts on Expert: Scott Harrison"	1:59:00	January 10, 2019
70	"Sarah Silverman"	2:39:00	January 14, 2019
71	"LIVE: Lil Rel"	1:59:00	January 17, 2019
72	"Jay Leno"	2:03:00	January 21, 2019
73	"Experts on Expert: Bret Weinstein"	2:51:00	January 24, 2019
74	"Michael Peña"	2:14:00	January 28, 2019
75	"Experts on Expert: Todd Rose"	2:00:00	January 31, 2019
76	"Ryan Hansen"	2:41:00	February 4, 2019
77	"Experts on Expert: Dr. Phil"	2:07:00	February 7, 2019
78	"Jason Mantzoukas"	2:15:00	February 11, 2019
79	"Best of Year One"	1:54:00	February 14, 2019
80	"Chelsea Peretti"	1:55:00	February 18, 2019
81	"LIVE: Gillian Flynn"	2:00:00	February 21, 2019
82	"Jake Johnson"	2:05:00	February 25, 2019
83	"Experts on Expert: John Gottman"	2:32:00	February 28, 2019
84	"Pete Holmes"	2:10:00	March 4, 2019
85	"Experts on Expert: Reshma Saujani"	2:20:00	March 7, 2019
86	"Evan Rachel Wood"	2:07:00	March 11, 2019
87	"Experts on Expert: Johann Hari"	2:25:00	March 14, 2019
88	"Gwyneth Paltrow"	2:03:00	March 18, 2019
89	"LIVE: Thomas Middleditch"	1:54:00	March 21, 2019
90	"Chris D'Elia"	1:55:00	March 25, 2019
91	"Experts on Expert: John Kim"	2:09:00	March 28, 2019
92	"Chelsea Handler"	2:01:00	April 1, 2019
93	"LIVE: Michael Rosenbaum"	2:04:00	April 4, 2019
94	"Adam Pally"	1:56:00	April 8, 2019
95	"Experts on Expert: Sanjay Gupta"	1:37:00	April 11, 2019
96	"Will Forte"	2:05:00	April 15, 2019
97	"Experts on Expert: Michael Gervais"	2:25:00	April 18, 2019
98	"Norah Jones"	2:11:00	April 22, 2019
99	"Experts on Expert: Dr. Eric Topol"	1:50:00	April 25, 2019
100	"Stephen Merchant"	1:46:00	April 29, 2019
101	"Experts on Expert: Esther Perel"	2:22:00	May 2, 2019
102	"Hasan Minhaj"	1:59:00	May 6, 2019
103	"Experts on Expert: Bill Nye"	1:57:00	May 9, 2019
104	"Justin Long"	1:58:00	May 13, 2019
105	"LIVE: Monica Padman"	1:41:00	May 16, 2019
106	"Craig T. Nelson"	1:57:00	May 20, 2019
107	"Experts on Expert: Samin Nosrat"	2:17:00	May 23, 2019
108	"Kumail Nanjiani"	1:31:00	May 27, 2019
109	"Experts on Expert: Erin Lee Carr"	1:40:00	May 30, 2019
110	"Will Ferrell"	1:29:00	June 3, 2019
111	"Experts on Expert: Elizabeth Gilbert"	2:14:00	June 6, 2019
112	"Jeff Garlin"	1:36:00	June 10, 2019
113	"LIVE: David Walton"	1:29:00	June 13, 2019
114	"Julia Louis-Dreyfus"	1:49:00	June 17, 2019
115	"Experts on Expert: Alexandra Katehakis"	2:01:00	June 20, 2019
116	"Aubrey Plaza"	2:01:00	June 24, 2019
117	"Experts on Expert: Steve Madden"	1:30:00	June 27, 2019
118	"Bill Hader"	1:22:00	July 1, 2019
119	"Experts on Expert: Jennifer Newsom"	1:26:00	July 4, 2019
120	"Andy Richter"	1:30:00	July 8, 2019
121	"LIVE: W. Kamau Bell"	1:47:00	July 11, 2019
122	"Fred Savage"	1:10:00	July 15, 2019
123	"Experts on Expert: Dr. Rahul Jandial"	1:44:00	July 18, 2019
124	"Lake Bell"	2:08:00	July 22, 2019
125	"Experts on Expert: Mayor Eric Garcetti"	1:37:00	July 25, 2019
126	"Ben Platt"	1:51:00	July 29, 2019
127	"LIVE: Dan Savage"	2:03:00	August 1, 2019
128	"Casey Affleck"	2:00:00	August 5, 2019
129	"LIVE: Peter Krause"	1:38:00	August 8, 2019
130	"Busy Philipps"	2:15:00	August 12, 2019
131	"Experts on Expert: Tal Ben-Shahar"	1:56:00	August 15, 2019
132	"Danny McBride"	1:38:00	August 19, 2019
133	"Experts on Expert: Steven Gundry"	1:56:00	August 22, 2019
134	"Beanie Feldstein"	2:08:00	August 26, 2019
135	"LIVE: David Koechner"	1:44:00	August 29, 2019
136	"Kal Penn"	1:37:00	September 2, 2019
137	"Experts on Expert: Pete Carroll"	1:54:00	September 5, 2019
138	"Joseph Gordon-Levitt"	1:06:00	September 9, 2019
139	"Experts on Expert: Dog the Bounty Hunter"	2:05:00	September 12, 2019
140	"Charlie Day"	2:24:00	September 16, 2019
141	"Experts on Expert: Dave Asprey"	2:00:00	September 19, 2019
142	"Jim Gaffigan"	2:04:00	September 23, 2019
143	"LIVE: Monica Potter"	1:26:10	September 26, 2019
144	"The Avett Brothers"	2:03:39	September 30, 2019
145	"Lori Gottlieb"	1:38:10	October 3, 2019
146	"Adam Devine"	1:39:54	October 7, 2019
147	"Dr. Nadine Burke Harris"	2:15:34	October 10, 2019
148	"Jim Jefferies"	1:55:36	October 14, 2019
149	"Monica Lewinsky"	1:52:30	October 17, 2019
150	"Elizabeth Banks"	1:52:30	October 21, 2019
151	"LIVE: Andrew Zimmern"	1:45:17	October 24, 2019
152	"Edward Norton"	1:51:50	October 28, 2019
153	"Liz Plank"	1:54:07	October 31, 2019
154	"Kate & Oliver Hudson"	2:01:18	November 4, 2019
155	"Richard Dawkins"	1:42:30	November 7, 2019
156	"Judd Apatow"	2:09:25	November 11, 2019
157	"Jonathan Safran Foer"	2:31:58	November 14, 2019
158	"Emilia Clarke"	2:22:39	November 18, 2019
159	"LIVE: Martina McBride"	1:39:40	November 21, 2019
160	"Tony Hale"	2:01:51	November 25, 2019
161	"Laura Beil"	2:05:17	November 28, 2019
162	"Sam Elliott"	1:34:08	December 2, 2019
163	"Adam Grant"	2:17:19	December 5, 2019
164	"T.I."	1:58:00	December 9, 2019
165	"Malcolm Gladwell"	1:57:00	December 12, 2019
166	"BONUS: Rhys Darby (Live)"	41:06	December 14, 2019
167	"Keri Russell"	1:52:15	December 16, 2019
168	"Best of 2019"	3:05:15	December 19, 2019
169	"Holiday Spectacular 2019"	1:24:44	December 23, 2019

=== 2020 episodes ===
No.	Title	Run Time	Original release date
170	"Rainn Wilson"	1:59	January 6, 2020
171	"Ronan Farrow"	1:59	January 9, 2020
172	"January Jones"	1:59	January 13, 2020
173	"Sam Harris Returns"	2:24	January 16, 2020
174	"Drew Carey"	1:44	January 20, 2020
175	"LIVE: Dierks Bentley"	1:30	January 23, 2020
176	"Claire Danes"	2:01	January 27, 2020
177	"Jared Cohen"	2:07	January 30, 2020
178	"Will Arnett"	1:40	February 3, 2020
179	"Chris Voss"	1:40	February 6, 2020
180	"Josh Gad"	1:43	February 10, 2020
Bonus	"Introducing...Monica & Jess Love Boys"	00:02:11	February 12, 2020
181	"Ezra Klein"	1:59	February 13, 2020
Bonus	"Part 1: Monica and Jess Love Boys with Dax Shepard"	1:21	February 14, 2020
182	"Alison Brie"	2:06	February 17, 2020
Bonus	"Part 2: Monica & Jess Love Boys who like Christmas"	1:10	February 17, 2020
183	"LIVE: Jason De León"	1:27	February 20, 2020
184	"Ashton Kutcher Returns"	1:56	February 24, 2020
Bonus	"Part 3: Monica & Jess Love Motherly Advice with Kristen Bell"	1:27	February 26, 2020
185	"Peggy Orenstein"	1:43	February 27, 2020
186	"Whitney Cummings"	2:01	March 2, 2020
Bonus	"Part 4: Monica & Jess Love Therapy with Harry the Therapist"	1:27	March 4, 2020
187	"BJ Fogg"	1:45	March 5, 2020
188	"Men's Bodies with Kumail Nanjiani & Rob McElhenney"	1:53	March 9, 2020
Bonus	"Part 5: Monica & Jess Love Getting Called Out on Their Bullshit with Dr. Drew"	1:08	March 11, 2020
189	"Adam Mosseri"	1:55	March 12, 2020
190	"Lennon Parham"	1:48	March 16, 2020
Bonus	"Part 6: Monica & Jess Love Tough Love with Patti Stanger (the Millionaire Matchmaker)"	1:09	March 18, 2020
191	"Tom Silver"	1:50	March 19, 2020
192	"Sanjay Gupta on COVID-19"	00:54	March 23, 2020
Bonus	"Part 7: Monica & Jess Love Goblins with Esther Perel"	1:19	March 25, 2020
193	"Lydia Denworth"	1:47	March 26, 2020
194	"Joy Bryant Returns"	1:15	March 30, 2020
Bonus	"Part 8: Monica & Jess Love Cock Buffets with Dan Savage"	1:26	April 1, 2020
195	"Stephen Dubner"	2:10	April 2, 2020
196	"Alicia Keys"	1:46	April 6, 2020
Bonus	"Part 9: Monica & Jess love Love Addiction with Dr. Alex Katehakis"	1:23	April 8, 2020
197	"Andrew Marantz"	1:43	April 9, 2020
198	"Ed Helms"	1:34	April 13, 2020
Bonus	"Part 10: Monica & Jess Love Each Other with Dax & Kristen"	1:09	April 15, 2020
199	"Jessica Lahey"	1:37	April 16, 2020
200	"Sheryl Crow"	1:25	April 20, 2020
201	"Glennon Doyle"	1:55	April 23, 2020
202	"Rob Lowe"	1:42	April 27, 2020
203	"David Chang"	1:38	April 30, 2020
204	"Zoë Kravitz"	1:48	May 4, 2020
205	"Dan Heath"	1:38	May 7, 2020
206	"America Ferrera"	1:28	May 11, 2020
207	"Rajiv Shah"	1:54	May 14, 2020
208	"50 Cent"	1:02	May 18, 2020
209	"Laurie Santos"	1:34	May 21, 2020
210	"Melissa McCarthy"	1:29	May 25, 2020
211	"Jon Meacham"	1:40	May 28, 2020
212	"Heather McGhee"	1:25	June 4, 2020
213	"Bradley Whitford"	1:23	June 8, 2020
214	"Ibram X. Kendi"	1:28	June 11, 2020
215	"Alanis Morissette"	1:21	June 12, 2020
216	"Beastie Boys"	1:15	June 15, 2020
217	"Vivek Murthy"	2:02	June 18, 2020
Bonus	"BONUS: Malcolm Gladwell"	00:32:43	June 19, 2020
218	"Blake Griffin"	1:49	June 22, 2020
219	"Jeffrey Sachs"	1:54	June 25, 2020
220	"Juliette Lewis"	1:16	June 29, 2020
221	"Nina Vasan"	1:48	July 2, 2020
222	"Jennifer Eberhardt"	1:22	July 3, 2020
223	"Emily Mortimer"	1:20	July 6, 2020
224	"Jud Brewer"	2:09	July 9, 2020
225	"John Legend"	1:31	July 13, 2020
226	"David Sinclair"	1:36	July 16, 2020
227	"Rob Corddry"	1:51	July 20, 2020
228	"Travis Pastrana"	1:38	July 23, 2020
229	"Dave Franco"	1:22	July 27, 2020
230	"Angela Duckworth"	1:48	July 30, 2020
231	"Leslie Odom Jr."	1:25	August 3, 2020
232	"Bradley Edwards"	1:33	August 6, 2020
233	"Colin Jost"	1:40	August 10, 2020
234	"Atul Gawande"	1:31	August 13, 2020
235	"Michael Tubbs"	1:03	August 14, 2020
236	"Sean Penn"	1:40	August 17, 2020
237	"Bill Gates"	1:37	August 20, 2020
238	"Ellen Pompeo"	1:37	August 24, 2020
239	"Nadia Bolz-Weber"	1:50	August 27, 2020
240	"Jason Bateman Returns"	1:54	August 31, 2020
241	"Lenore Skenazy"	2:06	September 3, 2020
242	"Seth MacFarlane"	1:53	September 7, 2020
243	"Tom Brady"	1:43	September 10, 2020
244	"Susan Burton"	0:52	September 11, 2020
245	"Keith Urban"	1:20	September 14, 2020
246	"Leah Plunkett"	1:45	September 17, 2020
247	"Sara Bareilles"	1:31	September 21, 2020
248	"David Farrier"	1:47	September 24, 2020
Bonus	"Day 7: Dax Sheppard"	0:47	September 25, 2020
249	"Aly Raisman"	1:41	October 1, 2020
250	"Jon Bon Jovi"	1:32	October 5, 2020
251	"Bob Woodward"	1:17	October 8, 2020
252	"Sara Gilbert"	1:22	October 12, 2020
253	"Eric Lander"	2:07	October 15, 2020
254	"Isabel Wilkerson"	1:08	October 16, 2020
255	"Chelsea Handler Returns"	1:35	October 19, 2020
256	"Erin Geiger Smith"	1:45	October 22, 2020
257	"Matthew McConaughey"	1:52	October 26, 2020
258	"Joseph Laycock"	1:49	October 29, 2020
259	"Adam Brody"	1:28	November 2, 2020
260	"Yuval Harari Returns"	1:31	November 5, 2020
261	"Kaley Cuoco"	1:49	November 9, 2020
262	"Daniel Ricciardo"	1:48	November 12, 2020
263	"Halsey"	1:44	November 16, 2020
264	"Tristan Harris"	2:09	November 19, 2020
AAD–001	"Armchaired & Dangerous: Lizard People"	0:56	November 20, 2020
265	"Jewel"	1:31	November 23, 2020
266	"Susan David"	1:45	November 26, 2020
267	"Hillary Clinton"	1:29	November 30, 2020
268	"Scott Kelly"	1:43	December 3, 2020
269	"Emmanuel Acho"	0:50	December 4, 2020
270	"Natalie Portman"	1:41	December 7, 2020
271	"Dov Fox"	1:35	December 10, 2020
AAD–002	"Armchaired & Dangerous: Mole Children"	0:48	December 11, 2020
272	"Shawn Mendes"	1:51	December 14, 2020
273	"John O. Brennan"	1:39	December 17, 2020
274	"Holiday Spectacular 2020"	2:00	December 21, 2020
275	"Best of 2020"	2:17	December 24, 2020

=== 2021 episodes ===
No.	Title	Run Time	Original release date
276	"Jackie Tohn"	1:39	January 4, 2021
277	"Sanjay Gupta Returns"	1:55	January 7, 2021
278	"Randy Jackson"	1:25	January 11, 2021
279	"Brad Grossman"	1:16	January 14, 2021
AAD–003	"Armchaired & Dangerous: Bigfoot"	1:07	January 15, 2021
280	"Common"	1:25	January 18, 2021
R270–000	"Introducing... Race to 270"	0:02	January 19, 2021
R270–001	"Race to 270: 306 and 230"	0:42	January 20, 2021
281	"Jamil Zaki"	1:38	January 21, 2021
282	"Justin Timberlake"	1:26	January 25, 2021
R270–002	"Race to 270: Chicken Breasts & Triple Cheeseburgers"	0:40	January 27, 2021
283	"Jethro Bovingdon & Rob Corddry"	1:23	January 28, 2021
284	"Robert Livingston"	1:17	January 29, 2021
285	"Carey Mulligan"	1:29	February 1, 2021
R270–003	"Race to 270: First Class Salami & Spaghetti with Meat Sauce"	0:45	February 3, 2021
286	"Adam Grant Returns"	2:21	February 4, 2021
Bonus	"Celebrating the GOAT GOD: Tom Brady Replay"	1:20	February 5, 2021
287	"Jason Segel"	1:17	February 8, 2021
R270–004	"Race to 270: Body Bronzer & Big Dan with his Big Chrome"	0:37	February 10, 2021
288	"Emily Morse"	1:21	February 11, 2021
AAD–004	"Armchaired & Dangerous: September 11th"	1:11	February 12, 2021
289	"Salma Hayek"	1:43	February 15, 2021
Bonus	"NEW SHOW: Nurture vs Nurture with Dr. Wendy Mogel"	1:14	February 16, 2021
R270–005	"Race to 270: Pee Pee Gets a Carcass & Double Payout?"	0:31	February 17, 2021
290	"Erin Meyer"	1:21	February 18, 2021
291	"Viggo Mortensen"	1:25	February 22, 2021
R270–006	"Race to 270: Zaddy Add Ons & Cul de Sac Kickball"	0:45	February 24, 2021
292	"Jane Goodall"	1:23	February 25, 2021
293	"Chad Sanders"	1:20	February 26, 2021
294	"Amy Poehler"	1:46	March 1, 2021
R270–007	"Race to 270: Autoeroticism & Athletic Greens"	0:30	March 3, 2021
295	"Michael Eric Dyson"	1:32	March 4, 2021
296	"Rupert Grint"	1:14	March 8, 2021
R270–008	"Race to 270: Receptionist Ring Fingers & 6 Eggs on Top"	0:54	March 10, 2021
297	"George Saunders"	1:10	March 11, 2021
AAD–005	"Armchaired & Dangerous: JFK Assassination"	1:14	March 12, 2021
298	"Bill Gates Book Talk"	1:00	March 13, 2021
299	"Ben Schwartz"	1:30	March 15, 2021
R270–009	"Race to 270: Peyronies & Sleeping Aids"	0:36	March 17, 2021
300	"Ethan Kross"	1:38	March 18, 2021
301	"Robin Thicke"	1:31	March 22, 2021
R270–010	"Race to 270: Septoplasty and 2X Neck Girth"	0:46	March 24, 2021
302	"Susan Liautaud"	2:00	March 25, 2021
303	"Sam Pollard"	0:59	March 26, 2021
304	"Rachel Bilson"	1:36	March 29, 2021
305	"Walter Isaacson"	1:14	April 1, 2021
306	"Lamorne Morris"	1:25	April 5, 2021
307	"Daniel Goleman"	1:36	April 8, 2021
AAD–006	"Armchaired & Dangerous: Cannibalism"	1:20	April 9, 2021
308	"Hank Azaria"	1:49	April 12, 2021
309	"Michael Moss"	1:30	April 15, 2021
310	"Macklemore"	1:50	April 19, 2021
311	"Andrew Yang"	1:19	April 22, 2021
312	"Dorothy A. Brown"	1:12	April 23, 2021
313	"William Jackson Harper"	1:27	April 26, 2021
314	"Alexi Pappas"	1:33	April 29, 2021
315	"Kelly Osbourne"	1:46	May 3, 2021
316	"Kwame Onwuachi"	0:50	May 6, 2021
AAD–007	"Armchaired & Dangerous: Simulation Theory"	1:11	May 7, 2021
317	"Seth Rogen Returns"	1:28	May 10, 2021
318	"Prince Harry"	1:35	May 13, 2021
319	"Jonathan Tucker"	1:38	May 17, 2021
320	"Daniel Kahneman"	1:42	May 20, 2021
321	"Yusef Salaam & Ethan Herisse"	1:03	May 21, 2021
322	"Julianna Margulies"	1:40	May 24, 2021
323	"Susan Stryker"	1:37	May 27, 2021
324	"Vincent D'Onofrio Returns"	1:38	May 31, 2021
325	"Bubba Wallace"	1:19	June 3, 2021
AAD–008	"Armchaired & Dangerous: UFOs"	1:08	June 4, 2021
326	"Russell Brand"	1:25	June 7, 2021
327	"Chris Bosh"	1:38	June 10, 2021
328	"Jessica Biel"	1:42	June 14, 2021
329	"Barry Meier"	1:17	June 17, 2021
330	"Fresh"	1:04	June 18, 2021
331	"Luke Wilson"	1:29	June 21, 2021
340	"Tara Stoinski"	1:29	June 24, 2021
341	"J.B. Smoove"	1:11	June 28, 2021
342	"Barack Obama"	1:13	July 1, 2021
343	"Quentin Tarantino"	1:46	July 5, 2021
344	"Michael Pollan"	1:44	July 8, 2021
345	"Kate Beckinsale"	1:59	July 12, 2021
346	"Esther Perel Returns"	1:59	July 15, 2021
347	"Mila Kunis & Ashton Kutcher"	1:12	July 19, 2021
348	"Tim Grover"	1:03	July 22, 2021
349	"Leon Bridges"	1:38	July 26, 2021
350	"Mark Ronson"	1:43	July 15, 2021
351	"Matt Damon"	1:55	August 2, 2021
352	"Daryl Hall"	1:23	August 5, 2021
353	"Kristen Bell Returns"	1:11	August 9, 2021
354	"Maya Shankar"	2:03	August 12, 2021
355	"Cecily Strong"	1:30	August 16, 2021
356	"Padma Lakshmi"	1:42	August 19, 2021
357	"Matthew Rhys"	1:18	August 23, 2021
358	"Samantha Bee"	1:49	August 26, 2021
359	"Brie Larson"	1:44	August 30, 2021
360	"Carmelo Anthony"	1:10	September 2, 2021
361	"Awkwafina"	1:31	September 6, 2021
362	"Kate Bowler"	1:23	September 9, 2021
363	"Amanda Peet"	1:56	September 13, 2021
364	"Dr. Harold S. Koplewicz"	1:35	September 16, 2021
365	"Alicia Vikander"	1:28	September 30, 2021
366	"Andrew Huberman"	2:23	September 23, 2021
367	"Drew Barrymore"	2:10	September 27, 2021
368	"Steven Pinker"	1:21	September 30, 2021
369	"Elijah Wood"	1:30	October 4, 2021
370	"David Sedaris Returns"	1:48	October 7, 2021
371	"B. J. Novak"	2:10	October 11, 2021
372	"Van Jones"	1:59	October 14, 2021
373	"Ron Howard"	1:42	October 18, 2021
374	"Amishi Jha"	1:51	October 21, 2021
375	"Gwyneth Paltrow Returns"	1:27	October 25, 2021
376	"David Copperfield"	1:55	October 28, 2021
377	"Ed Sheeran"	1:45	November 1, 2021
378	"Paul Bloom"	1:44	November 4, 2021
379	"Stanley Tucci"	1:59	November 8, 2021
380	"Khalil Gibran Muhammad"	1:40	November 11, 2021
381	"Rachael Ray"	1:17	November 15, 2021
382	"Erin Lee Carr Returns (documentarian of Britney Vs Spears)"	1:16	November 18, 2021
383	"Nick Offerman"	1:43	November 22, 2021
384	"Chris Wallace"	1:50	November 25, 2021
385	"Bradley Cooper"	1:53	November 29, 2021
386	"Reid Hoffman (LinkedIn co-founder)"	1:45	December 2, 2021
387	"Brooke Shields"	1:55	December 6, 2021
388	"Anderson Cooper (CNN Political Commentator)"	1:42	December 9, 2021
389	"Best of 2021"	1:38	December 13, 2021
390	"Holiday Spectacular 2021"	1:20	December 20, 2021

=== 2022 episodes ===
No.	Title	Episode Type	Run Time	Original release date
391	"Dwyane Wade"	Celebrity	1:37	January 3, 2022
392	"Eric Schmidt (former Google CEO)"	Expert	1:45	January 6, 2022
393	"Jeremy Renner"	Celebrity	1:12	January 10, 2022
394	"Stacey Abrams (former Georgia State Representative & Voting Rights Activist"	Expert	1:24	January 13, 2022
395	"Max Greenfield"	Celebrity	1:22	January 17, 2022
396	"Michael Moore (documentary filmmaker)"	Expert	1:37	January 20, 2022
397	"Kristen Stewart"	Celebrity	1:38	January 24, 2022
398	"Brian Klaas (political scientist)"	Expert	1:49	January 27, 2022
399	"David Arquette"	Celebrity	1:13	January 31, 2022
400	"Michael Schur Returns"	Celebrity	1:46	February 3, 2022
401	"Kristen Bell Returns Again"	Celebrity	1:18	February 7, 2022
402	"Brené Brown Returns"	Expert	1:40	February 10, 2022
AAD–009	"Armchaired & Dangerous LIVE: Bill Gates"	Armchaired & Dangerous	0:56	February 11, 2022
403	"Nicholas Hoult"	Celebrity	1:12	February 14, 2022
404	"Metta World Peace (former NBA player)"	Celebrity	1:24	February 17, 2022
405	"Zooey Deschanel"	Celebrity	1:18	February 21, 2022
406	"Chuck Palahniuk (novelist)"	Expert	1:34	February 24, 2022
407	"Alia Shawkat"	Celebrity	1:22	February 28, 2022
408	"Jacqueline Novogratz"	Expert	1.11	March 3, 2022
AAD–010	"Armchaired & Dangerous: Birds Aren't Real"	Armchaired & Dangerous	0.49	March 4, 2022
409	"Bob Odenkirk"	Celebrity	1.19	March 7, 2022
410	"Roy Choi"	Expert	1.59	March 10, 2022
411	"Seth Meyers Returns"	Celebrity	1.36	March 14, 2022
412	"Monica Aldama"	Expert	2.02	March 17, 2022
AAD–011	"Armchaired & Dangerous: Havana Syndrome"	Armchaired & Dangerous	1.10	March 18, 2022
413	"Tony Hawk & Sam Jones"	Celebrity	1.42	March 21, 2022
414	"Daniel Pink"	Expert	1.45	March 24, 2022
415	"Jimmy Fallon"	Celebrity	1.28	March 28, 2022
416	"Brian Cox"	Expert	1.35	March 31, 2022
AAD–012	"Armchaired & Dangerous: MK-ULTRA"	Armchaired & Dangerous	0.59	April 1, 2022
417	"Mandy Moore"	Celebrity	1.40	April 4, 2022
418	"Anna Lembke (Psychiatrist on Addiction)"	Expert	1.28	April 7, 2022
428	"Cillian Murphy"	Celebrity	1.31	April 11, 2022
429	"Paul Feig (Filmmaker)"	Expert	1.27	April 14, 2022
BONUS	"Armchair Stories"	N/A	0:51	April 15, 2022
430	"Craig Robinson"	Celebrity	1:10	April 18, 2022
431	"Floyd Abrams"	Expert	1:23	April 21, 2022
AAD-013 (432)	"Armchaired & Dangerous Live: Charles Manson"	Armchaired & Dangerous	1:27	April 22, 2022
433	"Josh Brolin"	Celebrity	2:02	April 25, 2022
434	"A.J. Jacobs (on puzzles and living biblically)"	Expert	1:53	April 28, 2022
435	"Emmy Rossum"	Celebrity	1:46	May 2, 2022
436	"Joseph Henrich (professor of human evolutionary biology)"	Expert	1:48	May 5, 2022
437	"Molly Shannon"	Celebrity	1:46	May 9, 2022
438	"Cathy O'Neil (data scientist on shame)"	Expert	1:40	May 12, 2022
439	"Colson Baker (aka Machine Gun Kelly)"	Celebrity	2:03	May 16, 2022
440	"Phil Lord & Chris Miller (filmmaking duo)"	Expert	1:58	May 19, 2022
441	"Jerrod Carmichael"	Celebrity	2:10	May 23, 2022
442	"Ray Dalio (investor and hedge fund manager)"	Expert	1:49	May 26, 2022

== Accolades ==
Accolades received by Armchair Expert
Award	Year (Note: Indicates the year of ceremony)	Category	Recipient(s)	Result	Ref.
Golden Globe Awards	2026	Best Podcast	Armchair Expert	Nominated	
