= Teratophilia =

Sexual attraction to monsters

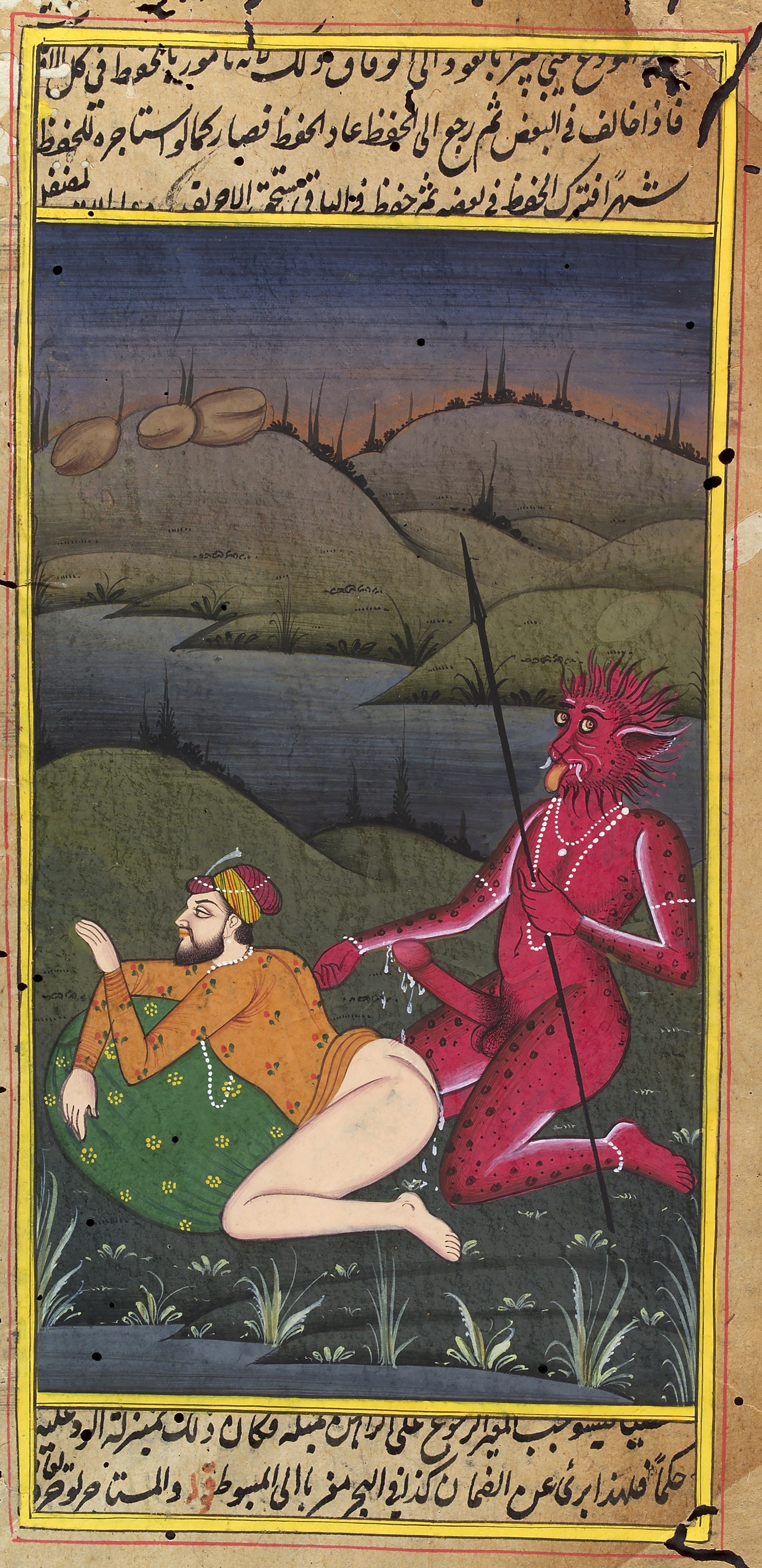
Indian painting depicting a man having sex with a devil

Teratophilia refers to the sexual attraction to monsters, demons, or cryptids. The word comes from the Ancient Greek: τέρας, romanized: teras, lit. 'monster' and φιλία, filia, 'love'.

== In general ==
Teratophilia is classified as a paraphilia. Some do not view teratophilia as a kink. Among other things, it has been suggested that monsters can function as an escapist fantasy for some men-attracted men and women, since the monster is able to embody masculine attributes without presenting itself as a man, which may embody trauma and terror in extreme cases, or aggravating patriarchal arrangements in the least.

== Trends ==
=== Tumblr ===
Users on the website Tumblr have created fandoms sexualizing a wide range of monsters, from the Krampus to Pennywise from the 2017 movie It.

In 2017, the Amphibian Man, the monster from film The Shape of Water, became popular. The reaction to the creature has led to attempts by some dildo manufacturers to recreate his genitalia.

The Venom symbiote from Venom has gained substantial traction after the film's release in 2018. In 2019, the Venom fandom received some media attention after they took a stance against people who are attracted to Ted Bundy. The conflict gained so much traction online that even Marvel Comics' Venom writer Donny Cates weighed in.

=== Bigfoot ===
Monster erotica and Bigfoot erotica have entered the general consciousness after many news outlets, including CNN and BBC, published an article about an incident that happened on Twitter. In 2018 the U.S. Democratic Congressional nominee from Virginia, Leslie Cockburn, tweeted about her Republican opponent, Denver Riggleman, being a devotee of Bigfoot erotica. Cockburn used picture of naked Bigfoot from Riggleman's Instagram as a proof. Riggleman denied all the accusations. Dr. Chuck Tingle, author and two-time Hugo Award finalist, wrote a story about the incident, entitled Don't Vote for Virginia Congressional Hopeful Denber Wiggleman Because He Is Full of Hate, Not Because Bigfoot Makes Him Hard. Some popular bigfoot erotica titles include Cum for Bigfoot; Boffing Bigfoot; Savage Love; Bigfoot Did Me from Behind and I Liked It; The Butt Files – The Case of Bigfoot's Weiner; and Seduced by Bigfoot and Ravaged by the Yeti: The Secret Adventures of a Fertile Housewife.

== See also ==
- Coulrophilia – Paraphilia towards clowns
- Exophilia – Fetishism of extraterrestrials
- Tentacle erotica – Sensual art genre involving tentacles or pseudopods
- Monster girl – Speculative fiction character trope
