= Everybody's Live with John Mulaney =

American variety talk show

- Genre: Variety talk show
- Created by: John Mulaney
- Directed by: Joe DeMaio
- Presented by: John Mulaney
- Starring: Richard Kind
- Opening theme: "To Live and Die in L.A." by Wang Chung
- Country of origin: United States
- Original language: English
- No. of seasons: 1
- No. of episodes: 12

Production
- Executive producers: John Mulaney; Ashley Edens; John Foy; David Ferguson
- Producers: James Kim; Molly Lambert

Original release
- Network: Netflix
- Release: March 12, 2025 – present

Related
- John Mulaney Presents: Everybody's in LA

Everybody's Live with John Mulaney is an American live variety talk show that premiered on Netflix on March 12, 2025. Serving as a continuation of the series Everybody's in LA, the show is hosted by comedian John Mulaney who also serves as the creator and an executive producer. Richard Kind serves as the show's announcer and sidekick. The series features monologues, guests, pre-taped sketches, and musical segments with field pieces shot around Los Angeles. In January 2025, it was reported that the show had received a two-season order.

== Production ==
The series is a continuation of the series John Mulaney Presents: Everybody's in LA which ran for six episodes on Netflix as part of the Netflix is a Joke Festival in 2024. That series received both the Critics' Choice Television Award and the Television Critics Association for Outstanding Talk Series, as well as the Primetime Emmy Award for Outstanding Picture Editing for Variety Programming.

The name of the series was changed from Everybody's in LA due to reactions from focus groups which showed that "people in the United States don't like Los Angeles". The show would consist of 12 episodes from March 12 to May 28, 2025, with Mulaney returning as host and Richard Kind continuing his role as side-kick and announcer.

Prior to the show's premiere, Deadline Hollywood reported in January 2025 that the show was given a two-season order.

== Participants ==
=== Guests ===
- Michael Keaton (episode 1)
- Joan Baez (episode 1)
- Fred Armisen (episode 1)
- Finance columnist Jessica Roy (episode 1)
- Tracy Morgan as King Latifah (episode 1)
- Ben Stiller (episode 2)
- Quinta Brunson (episode 2)
- Nick Kroll (episode 2)
- Cruise industry expert Anne Kalosh (episode 2)
- Silkk the Shocker (episode 2)
- Pete Davidson (episode 3)
- Luenell (episode 3)
- Henry Winkler (episodes 3 & 12)
- Licensed funeral director Raymond Perez-Plascencia (episode 3)
- Fran Gillespie as audience member (episodes 3 & 6) and Geirsten (episode 8)
- Kevin Brew (episode 3)
- John Waters (episode 4)
- Wanda Sykes (episode 4)
- Stavros Halkias (episode 4)
- Neal Katyal (episode 4)
- Aidy Bryant as Jelly Roll (episode 4)
- Bill Hader (episode 5)
- Chelsea Peretti (episode 5)
- Johnny Knoxville (episode 5)
- HR executive Katie Maillard (episode 5)
- Leanne Morgan (episode 6)
- Hannibal Buress (episode 6)
- Nikki Glaser (episode 6)
- David Letterman (episode 6)
- Bonnie Aarons as Dumpster Thing (episode 6)
- Jimmy Kimmel (episode 6)
- Conan O'Brien (episode 7)
- Ayo Edebiri (episode 7)
- Tina Fey (episode 7)
- John Ennis as Santa Claus (episode 7)
- Molly Shannon (episode 8)
- Marc Maron (episode 8)
- Dr. Emily Methangkool (episode 8)
- Ronny Chieng (episode 8)
- Langston Kerman as Bubbles Jackson (episode 5) and Mohel Abraham Davis (episode 8)
- Andy Samberg (episode 9)
- Robby Hoffman (episode 9)
- Ramy Youssef (episode 9)
- American Automobile Association spokesperson Aixa Diaz (episode 9)
- Sarah Silverman (episode 10)
- Patton Oswalt (episode 10)
- Steve Guttenberg (episode 10)
- Dr. Rahul Jandial (episode 10)
- Paula Pell as Jean Dumb (episode 10)
- Fred Armisen as drummer (episode 10)
- Sigourney Weaver (episode 11)
- Natasha Lyonne (episode 11)
- Amy Sedaris (episode 11)
- Transit expert Alissa Walker (episode 11)
- Peter Gallagher as future John Mulaney (episode 11)
- Adam Sandler (episode 12)
- Joe Mande (episode 12)
- Sean Penn (episode 12)
- Carl Tart (episode 12)
- Zephyrine Lucan (episode 12)

=== Pre-taped performers ===
- Christopher Lloyd (episode 1)
- Anthony LaPaglia (episode 1)
- Rob Morrow (episode 1)
- Henry Woronicz (episode 1)
- Joe Cortese (episode 1)
- Melvin Abston (episode 1)
- Reese Webster (episode 1)
- Rocco Polanco (episode 1)
- Vanessa Bayer as Jerica (episode 2)
- Joe Manganiello (episode 3)
- Willie Geist (episode 3)
- Doug Pitt (episode 3)
- Randall Park (episode 4)
- Trey Anastasio as Jerry Seinfeld (episode 8)
- Mike Gordon as George Costanza (episode 8)
- Jon Fishman as Elaine Benes (episode 8)
- Page McConnell as Cosmo Kramer (episode 8)
- Twista (episode 10)

=== Notable guest callers ===
- Jack Horner (episode 7)
- Chuck Tingle (episode 7)
- Don Lessem (episode 7)

=== Musical performers ===
- Cypress Hill (episode 1)
- Kim Gordon (episode 2)
- Kim Deal (episode 2)
- Mannequin Pussy (episode 3)
- Daniel Hope (episode 4)
- New Century Chamber Orchestra (episode 4)
- Bartees Strange (episode 5)
- André De Shields as Chesterton Cheadle (episode 5)
- Charlie Wilson (episode 6)
- Randy Newman (episode 6)
- METZ (episode 7)
- John Cale (episode 8)
- Maggie Rogers (episode 8)
- Destroyer (episode 9)
- Jessica Pratt (episode 9)
- Alanis Morissette (episode 10)
- Lamorne Morris as Yakub (episode 10)
- Yeule (episode 11)
- Renée Elise Goldsberry as Mrs. T (episode 11)
- Sleater-Kinney (episode 12)
- Fred Armisen (episode 12)
- Bone Thugs-n-Harmony (episode 12)

== Episodes ==
No.	Title	Directed by	Written by	Original release date
1	"Should I Lend People Money?" "Lending People Money"	Joe DeMaio	Writing Supervised: Anna Drezen and Fran Gillespie. Writers: Jess Dweck, David Ferguson, Langston Kerman, Jeremy Levick, John Mulaney, Vanessa Ramos, Alex Scordelis, and Rajat Suresh	March 12, 2025
Mulaney talks to guests Michael Keaton, Joan Baez, Fred Armisen, and Personal finance columnist Jessica Roy. Musical guest Cypress Hill performed "Hits from the Bong". Mulaney opens the show with a monologue in which he discusses the title of the show, acting on Broadway in All In: Comedy About Love, his children, and his wife Olivia Munn's battle with cancer. Mulaney watches several men get attacked with lamps through a telescope. Saymo the robot is re-introduced. Baez talks about defending democracy in the U.S., Martin Luther King Jr.'s dirty sense of humor, and crashing her Tesla. Keaton shares an anecdote about Jack Nicholson's advice for giving money. Armisen promotes his new album 100 Sound Effects. Tracy Morgan portrays King Latifah. There's a pre-taped "Willy Loman Focus Group" sketch featuring Christopher Lloyd, Anthony Lapaglia, Rob Morrow, and others.
2	"Are Cruises Worth It?" "Cruises"	Joe DeMaio	Writing Supervised: Anna Drezen and Fran Gillespie. Writers: Jess Dweck, David Ferguson, Langston Kerman, Jeremy Levick, John Mulaney, Vanessa Ramos, Alex Scordelis, and Rajat Suresh	March 19, 2025
Mulaney talks to guests Nick Kroll, Quinta Brunson, Ben Stiller, and cruise industry expert Anne Kalosh. Musical guests Kim Gordon performed "Bye Bye", followed by Kim Deal who sung "Nobody Loves You More". Mulaney opens the show with a monologue, about how the show was in Netflix's top 10, the "Psychos" trend, cruise ships and the Titanic. The guests talk about the film The Poseidon Adventure and the series The Love Boat. In two pre-taped segments, Rabbi Goldstein talks extensively about the submarine thriller Crimson Tide (1995). The show honors Lt. Gen. Silkk the Shocker of No Limit Soldiers. They take calls from viewers, including a woman living in a cruise ship, and talk about The Poseidon Adventure remake from 2006, Poseidon. Vanessa Bayer portrays Jerica the Netflix AI assistant in a pre-taped sketch. Kim Gordon and Kim Deal end the show by performing, for the first time together, "Little Trouble Girl".
3	"What Kind of Funeral Should I Have?" "Funeral Planning"	Joe DeMaio	Writing Supervised: Anna Drezen and Fran Gillespie. Writers: Jess Dweck, David Ferguson, Langston Kerman, Jeremy Levick, John Mulaney, Vanessa Ramos, Alex Scordelis, and Rajat Suresh	March 26, 2025
Mulaney talks to guests Pete Davidson, Luenell, Henry Winkler, and licensed funeral director Raymond Perez-Plascencia. Musical guest Mannequin Pussy performed "I Got Heaven". In Mulaney's monologue, he thanks the audience for not watching Adolescence, discusses the topic "Funeral Planning", mentions Brazil, and questions the idea of reading The Diary of Anne Frank. A woman (Fran Gillespie) calls on Mulaney to assemble a line of 24 men by height. Kind promotes the game pack Richard Kind's Party Starters and shows a pre-taped video containing his will. Guests talk about Davidson's love life. Mulaney shows a video of Butterball from Hellraiser from someone's Ring camera. Kind recounts a party where Norman Lear showed him Rue McClanahan's ashes. PA Kevin Brew impersonates Kieran Culkin reciting his Oscars acceptance speech. The panel re-enact how they would die on screen. There is a brief tribute to David Lynch showing the exterior of Bob's Big Boys playing the Twin Peaks theme.
4	"What Do You Do About Squatters?" "Squatters"	Joe DeMaio	Writing Supervised: Anna Drezen and Fran Gillespie. Writers: Jess Dweck, David Ferguson, Langston Kerman, Jeremy Levick, John Mulaney, Vanessa Ramos, Alex Scordelis, and Rajat Suresh	April 2, 2025
Mulaney talks to guests John Waters, Wanda Sykes, Stavros Halkias, and Supreme Court lawyer Neal Katyal. Musical guests Daniel Hope with New Century Chamber Orchestra performed "Spring 1". Mulaney opens the show with an extended story about a scrapped bit involving trying to book Bone Thugs-n-Harmony for the show only to be scammed. Mulaney and Waters shared stories about hosting the Indie Spirit Awards, and Sykes talked about her standup tour. Mulaney shows two advertisements for the #KnowYourH campaign, one of which features Randall Park. Mulaney, Sykes and Waters look through the telescope where they see Richard Kind's twin get strangled to death by his business associate. They show a pre-taped video view of crew arrivals for the show. Aidy Bryant portrays Jelly Roll. Sykes shares her experience working for the NSA for 7 years, while Waters talks about the attractiveness of members of Antifa and the Proud Boys.
5	"What's the Best Way to Fire Someone?" "Getting Fired"	Joe DeMaio	Writing Supervised: Anna Drezen and Fran Gillespie. Writers: Jess Dweck, David Ferguson, Langston Kerman, Jeremy Levick, John Mulaney, Vanessa Ramos, Alex Scordelis, and Rajat Suresh	April 9, 2025
Mulaney talks to guests Bill Hader, Chelsea Peretti, Johnny Knoxville, and Human Resources Executive & Employee Coach Katie Maillard. Musical guest Bartees Strange performed "Sober" from his album Horror. The episode opens with a disclaimer saying that Richard Kind suffered a concussion and thinks he's Gene Simmons. Mulaney opens with an extended monologue about how his NBC sitcom pilot was rejected and how he later wrote commercials for Madden NFL video games featuring Ray Lewis, who gave him advice to "win your crowd" after he was wrongfully accused of murder and was later inspired by Gladiator. The pilot was later picked up by Fox and was titled Mulaney. Hader talks about how he got fired from a movie theater after spoiling the plot of Titanic and Peretti talked about working for Burly Bear Network and at Macy's. Mulaney muses about the brilliance of Jussie Smollett's hate crime hoax. A pre-taped sketch advertises telemedicine for the #KnowYourH campaign. André De Shields appears in the audience as Chesterton Cheadle (the cat who inspired Chester Cheetah) and performs a song. Mulaney shows a pre-taped interview with Michael Jackson's 41 year old chimp, Bubbles Jackson (portrayed by Langston Kerman), who talks about the late singer's sexual abuse allegations and later appears in studio to plug his podcast.
6	"How Tall Are You?" "Heights"	Joe DeMaio	Writing Supervised: Anna Drezen and Fran Gillespie. Writers: Jess Dweck, David Ferguson, Langston Kerman, Jeremy Levick, John Mulaney, Vanessa Ramos, Alex Scordelis, and Rajat Suresh	April 16, 2025
Mulaney talks to guests David Letterman, Leanne Morgan, Hannibal Buress, and Nikki Glaser. Musical guest Randy Newman performed "I Think It's Gonna Rain Today" and the satirical song "Political Science". Mulaney opens the show attempting to complete the #KnowYourH campaign. He gives a monologue where he talks about the absurdity of his show and his son's first pre-K theatrical show. Bonnie Aarons appears in the audience as Dumpster Thing (the thing that lives behind the dumpster from David Lynch's Mulholland Drive). Mulaney measures Letterman's height as being 6'1". There's a brief pre-taped writers' discussion behind a joke mentioning Charli XCX. Jimmy Kimmel arrives at the last minute to complete the #KnowYourH line, and Charlie Wilson sings "America the Beautiful" to celebrate. A brief pre-taped skit shows Mulaney complaining about filing his taxes jointly.
7	"Are Dinosaurs Put Together Correctly?"	Joe DeMaio	Writing Supervised: Anna Drezen and Fran Gillespie. Writers: Jess Dweck, David Ferguson, Langston Kerman, Jeremy Levick, John Mulaney, Vanessa Ramos, Alex Scordelis, and Rajat Suresh	April 23, 2025
Mulaney talks to guests Ayo Edebiri, Tina Fey (in place of Rita Moreno, who was unable to make it), and Conan O'Brien. Musical guest METZ performed "A Boat To Drown In". Mulaney opens the show describing it as their Christmas episode, and gives a monologue questioning if dinosaur bones are put together correctly, science, and the deaths of Pope Francis and Gene Hackman. Mulaney congratulates Conan on winning the Mark Twain Prize. The two discuss seeing Frank Sinatra, Christmas traditions, and dinosaurs. Ayo Edebiri presents Mulaney with a toy dinosaur and reads a Letterboxd review she wrote for the show. A pre-taped sketch has Mulaney interviewing a focus group of Terminator 2 stunt doubles. Guest callers included paleontologist Jack Horner, writer and entrepreneur Don Lessem, comedy monster erotica author Chuck Tingle, and a seven year old boy from Colorado. Mulaney shows a vulgar interactive dinosaur video from a Los Angeles museum. Mulaney gives his guests Christmas presents (Edebiri gets a candle, Fey gets Bruce Vilanch-glasses, and Conan gets to have sex with Santa).
8	"Can Major Surgery Be Fun?"	Joe DeMaio	Writing Supervised: Anna Drezen and Fran Gillespie. Writers: Jess Dweck, David Ferguson, Langston Kerman, Jeremy Levick, John Mulaney, Vanessa Ramos, Alex Scordelis, and Rajat Suresh	April 30, 2025
Mulaney talks to guests Molly Shannon, Marc Maron, Ronny Chieng, and anesthesiologist Dr. Emily Methangkool. Musical guests John Cale and Maggie Rogers performed "Shark-Shark" from Cale's latest album POPtical Illusion. Mulaney's opening monologue covered doctors, getting surgery, the movie Saturday Night, and potty training. Fran Gillespie appears as Richard's girlfriend, Geirsten, spoofing the relationship between Bill Belichick and Jordon Hudson. Mulaney looks out the telescope to see the band members of Phish dressed as the characters of Seinfeld. Dr. Emily recommends general anesthesia over deep sedation, Chieng shows off his ambidexterity, Rogers talks about chipping her teeth with her mic stand, and Cale talks about the new avant-garde music scene. A pre-taped sketch features Mulaney patrolling Sunset Gower Studios as a security guard. Mohel Abraham Davis (Langston Kerman) comes out to present new circumcision options. Mulaney teases the season finale, where he will fight three 14-year-old boys.
9	"Are You Ready For Real ID?"	Joe DeMaio	Writing Supervised: Anna Drezen and Fran Gillespie. Writers: Jess Dweck, David Ferguson, Langston Kerman, Jeremy Levick, John Mulaney, Vanessa Ramos, Alex Scordelis, and Rajat Suresh	May 7, 2025
Mulaney talks to guests Andy Samberg, Robby Hoffman, Ramy Youssef, and AAA spokesperson Aixa Diaz. Musical guests Destroyer and Jessica Pratt perform a medley of songs. Mulaney gives a monologue about the Real ID program (where the federal government began enforcing implementation on that day), the idea of liberals criticizing Elon Musk and his Department of Government Efficiency and FBI director Kash Patel, and the Varsity Blues scandal. There is a pre-taped documentary spoof shown on the behind the scenes of Everybody's Live celebrating "the real John Mulaney". Samberg and Mulaney read erotic fanfiction involving themselves. Hoffman talks about going through airport security and argues with Richard about getting a driver's license. Mulaney shows footage of a former FBI agent expressing opposition to Real ID and then himself attempting to get a Real ID-compliant license. They each reveal their favorite form of ID (Mulaney his pool membership ID, Youssef and Diaz their passport, Hoffman her Social Security Card, and Samberg passes on the question). Mulaney ends the show revealing Ben, the first of three teenage challengers who will fight him in the season finale.
10	"Why Can't I Sleep?"	Joe DeMaio	Writing Supervised: Anna Drezen and Fran Gillespie. Writers: Jess Dweck, David Ferguson, Langston Kerman, Jeremy Levick, John Mulaney, Vanessa Ramos, Alex Scordelis, and Rajat Suresh	May 14, 2025
Mulaney, hosting the entire show blindfolded, talks to guests Sarah Silverman, Patton Oswalt, and neuroscientist Dr. Rahul Jandial. Musical guest Alanis Morissette performs her iconic song "Ironic". He gives an opening monologue about his children's sleep routine, the new Pope Leo XIV and the interviews of the new pope's brother. A studio tutor advises Mulaney to show more of Kind. Yakub (Lamorne Morris), the creator of the white race, sings a comic musical number, "White Devil", then introduces Jean Dumb (Paula Pell), who has a comedic conversation with Mulaney. Steve Guttenberg later joins after being spotted through the telescope. Saymo through live-cutaways attempts to jump over a Mini Cooper; he ultimately fails and crashes. Silverman, Oswalt, Guttenberg, Jandial, and Morissette talk about their sleeping habits. There is a pre-taped promotional advertisement for the Everybody's Live teen magazine and an interview with rapper Twista about his ventriloquism act. The second teen challenger who will fight Mulaney, Jacob, is introduced. The show ends with Saymo joining the guests, revealing he is still alive.
11	"Is Uber Good?"	Joe DeMaio	Writing Supervised: Anna Drezen and Fran Gillespie. Writers: Jess Dweck, David Ferguson, Langston Kerman, Jeremy Levick, John Mulaney, Vanessa Ramos, Alex Scordelis, and Rajat Suresh	May 21, 2025
Mulaney talked to guests Sigourney Weaver, Natasha Lyonne, Amy Sedaris, and transit expert Alissa Walker. Musical guest Yeule performs "Skullcrusher" from their album Evangelic Girl Is a Gun. Mulaney gives an opening monologue about Uber and having an anti-crime law named after himself. He is visited by his future self (Peter Gallagher) who warns him against fighting the teenagers. Mr. T's ex-wife Mrs. T (Renée Elise Goldsberry) performs "Creatine" from the fictional album No Fools Left 2 Pity. Weaver discussed her preference for the taxis of New York City, a photoshoot with her and pumpkins, and working with James Cameron. A pre-taped sketch depicts the writers suggesting to Mulaney various tactics for the big fight and his training with small stuntwomen. Lyonne talks about her friendship with Mulaney, her involvement in his intervention, and wanting to shut down New York's bicycle lanes. A pre-taped sketch spoofing A Beautiful Mind and The Usual Suspects is shown. Mulaney ends the show revealing his third teen challenger, Adarsh.
12	"What is On The Minds of Teens?"	Joe DeMaio	Writing Supervised: Anna Drezen and Fran Gillespie. Writers: Jess Dweck, David Ferguson, Langston Kerman, Jeremy Levick, John Mulaney, Vanessa Ramos, Alex Scordelis, and Rajat Suresh	May 28, 2025
Mulaney talked to guests Adam Sandler, Joe Mande, teen babysitter Zephyrine Lucan, and Sean Penn. Musical guest Sleater-Kinney featuring Fred Armisen performs "Kids in America". Mulaney gives a monologue about the plight of teenagers, the everlasting threat of Russia, the space race, and going to a Frank Sinatra concert. Henry Winkler appears playing a teenager in a skit about drunk driving. Sandler and Penn give Mulaney advice for the fight. There are two pre-taped sketches: "Hyacinth on the Street" (a series of vox pop interviews by Mulaney's babysitter) and "Teen Town" (where Mulaney trains teens to navigate adulthood). The show ends with Mulaney fighting Ben, Jacob and Adarsh. The teens win against Mulaney, and Bone Thugs-n-Harmony comes out to perform "Tha Crossroads" before awarding the belt to the boys.

== Reception ==
=== Critical reviews ===
The first episode of the series received positive reviews with Rotten Tomatoes giving it a 100% rating with 9 reviews from critics. Metacritic gave the series a 77% rating based on six reviews. Ben Travers of IndieWire wrote, "Its sense of humor may call to mind Conan O'Brien's absurdist Late Night work, and the visual style may hearken back to Johnny Carson's era, but John Mulaney isn't trying to make another late-night talk show. He's trying to make his".

Alison Herman of Variety described the show as being "consistently delightful chaos" adding, "Part of what made Everybody's in LA so exciting was in how it took the cultural decline of the talk show as an opportunity. Rather than subjecting itself to the endless grind of daily headlines or relying on stars' promotional schedules to book guests, the show would embrace the niche fascination its genre was already trending toward — treating 'talk show' like an aesthetic to be tried on and toyed with, not a set of expectations to be met."

=== Accolades ===
Year	Award	Category	Recipient(s)	Result	Ref.
2025	Astra TV Awards	Best Talk Show	Everybody's Live with John Mulaney	Nominated	
