= Oscar Ybarra =

American psychologist

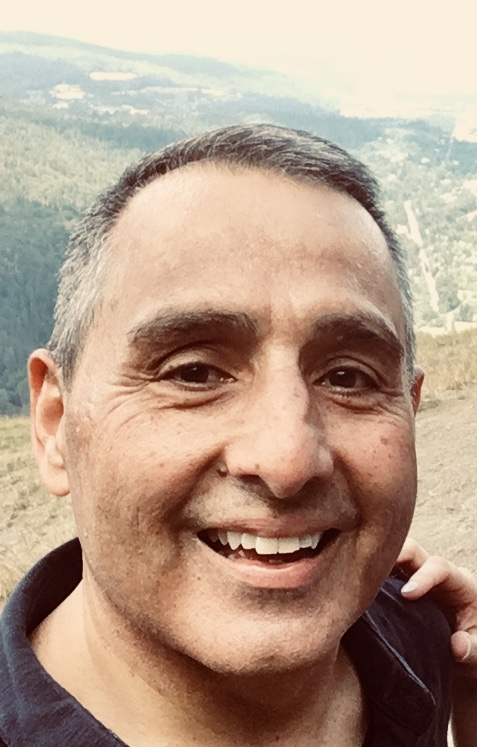

Oscar Ybarra is an American psychologist. He is professor of organizational behavior at the University of Illinois, and he is professor emeritus of psychology and management and organizations at the University of Michigan. Ybarra is also Research Director of the adaptive social cognition lab, and at Michigan he was Director of Innovate Blue, an organization focusing on innovation and entrepreneurship education. He has also been a visiting professor at Southwest University in Chongqing, China. His research largely revolves around the impact that social connections and social dynamics have on individuals and groups, particularly how patterns of social interaction influence individual cognition, how social media and social networking sites affect well-being, and how perceptions of trust and threat affect interpersonal and intergroup relations. Ybarra is also the co-founder of cred-ABLE LLC, a company that designs research-based assessments for individuals, teams, and small to mid-size companies.

== Early life ==
Ybarra was born and raised in Alpine, Texas. He attended Alpine High School, where he played football and baseball and was a percussionist in the band. He's a first generation American, as his parents moved to the United States from northern Mexico. His grandfather Ramón was a rancher who raised cattle to be sold both in Mexico and the United States. Ybarra has two older brothers and a younger sister. He's a first-generation college student.

== Education ==
Ybarra did not finish high school and got his GED instead. He took a few years before starting college at Sul Ross State University (SRSU). He initially focused his studies on biology, but eventually became interested in psychology. Ybarra earned a B.A. degree in psychology, and in 1990 earned a master's degree in political science. He then started graduate work at New Mexico State University. In 1996, he received his PhD in experimental social psychology, focusing on social memory processes that can impair the development of trust in relationships.

== Research ==
Ybarra directs the Adaptive Social Cognition Lab (ASC Lab), a lab that pursues various research programs related to social networking and interpersonal connection. Ybarra's research primarily focuses on people's interactions and the development of relationships, and the effect that relationships have on people's ability to manage their attention, reason well and make good decisions, and maintain one's well-being and meaning in life.

== Publications ==
Ybarra has studied and written about general cognitive functioning being promoted by socializing, social network site use and wellbeing, cross-cultural differences and group dynamics, and judgement and interpersonal processes. His research has received much national and international media coverage, and his research findings on older adults and cognitive functioning have been used in U.S. congressional hearings.

== Future projects ==
Ybarra maintains several research collaborations and a collection of research and writing projects. These include ongoing research on socializing and the risk of developing dementia (which he conducts with his colleague Hiroko Dodge in neurology), how and when social networking sites influence wellbeing (a long-term collaboration with colleagues Ethan Kross, John Jonides, and Phillippe Verduyn), the basis of a sense of meaning and purpose in life, the importance of executive functions in effective leader behavior (with colleague Todd Chan), and how leaders can help individuals establish meaning at work. He is also currently working on two book projects, one dealing with self-optimization through the optimization of one's relationships, and another dealing with the "two educations" all students entering college should receive.
