= Erotica =

Category of sexually stimulating media

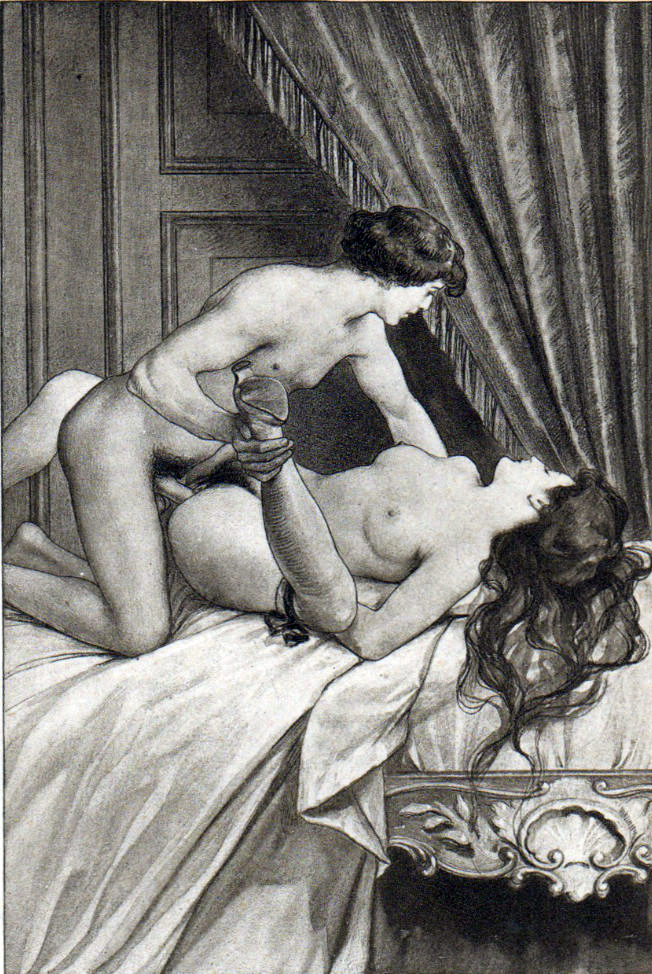
Illustration for Fanny Hill (1748) by Édouard-Henri Avril

Erotica is art, literature or photography that deals substantively with subject matter that is erotic, sexually stimulating or sexually arousing. Some critics regard pornography as a type of erotica, but many consider them to be separate. Erotic art may use any artistic form to depict erotic content, including painting, sculpture, drama, film or music. Erotic literature and erotic photography have become genres in their own right. Erotica also exists in a number of subgenres including gay, lesbian, women's, monster, tentacle and bondage erotica.

Curiosa are curiosities or rarities, especially unusual or erotic books. In the antiquarian book trade, pornographic works are often listed under "curiosa", "erotica" or "facetiae".

== Terminology ==
The term erotica is derived from the feminine form of the ancient Greek adjective: ἐρωτικός (erōtikós), from ἔρως (érōs)—words used to indicate lust, and sexual love.

A distinction is often made between erotica and pornography, although some viewers may not distinguish between them. A key distinction, some have argued, is that pornography's objective is the graphic depiction of sexually explicit scenes. At the same time, erotica "seeks to tell a story that involves sexual themes" that include a more plausible depiction of human sexuality than in pornography. Additionally, works considered degrading or exploitative tend to be classified by those who see them as such, as "porn" rather than as "erotica" and consequently, pornography is often described as exploitative or degrading.

== History ==
Erotica exists in many different forms, both modern and ancient. Erotic art dates back to the Paleolithic times, with cave paintings and carvings of female genitalia being a point of immense interest to prehistorians. Ancient Greek and Roman art depicted erotic acts or figures, often using phallic or erotic imagery to convey ideas of fertility. Modern depictions of erotic art are often intertwined with erotic photography, including boudoir photography, and erotic film.

Discussions of modern erotic art are also often merged with discussions on pornography. More specifically, erotic photography found its mass-market roots in pornographic magazines. The most iconic of these magazines is Playboy, a men's magazine founded in the 1950s that helped to shape the modern Western perception on sex and sexuality in the media. Pornographic magazines could also include boudoir photography or pin-up models, though pin-up models are not definitively sexual by nature.

Erotic film has evolved greatly with modern filmmaking capabilities, including developing a large subgenre of cartoon pornography, the most popular form of which is Japanese hentai. Erotic film is the form of erotica most often seen as interchangeable with pornography due to their similarities in form and function.

Erotic literature also dates back to ancient times, though not quite as far. Arguably the most iconic erotic piece of literature, the Kama Sutra is a Sanskrit text largely describing and depicting ideas of sex, sexuality, love, and human emotion. Eroticism in ancient Greece and Rome was not contained to only visual art, as poets such as the Greek Sappho and the Roman Catullus and Ovid wrote erotic verse and lyrical poems.

Modern erotic literature, often called 'smut', is quite popular, especially among women. In the 21st century, fan fiction erotica has gained popularity. Stories on online websites like Archive of Our Own and FanFiction.Net account for a large percentage of modern erotic fan fiction literature. A large sample size revealed that women read more erotic literature than men, and that among those who consistently read erotica, about 95% are women.

== Views ==
The topic of sex is often taboo in modern culture, especially in media. Censorship is an issue often faced by creators of erotic work, be it art, film, or literature. The legality of creating and publishing erotic works differs in different parts of the world, but it is not uncommon to see heavy regulations placed on the publication of erotic or pornographic media.

The legality of cartoon pornography or animated erotic films is one of the most controversial aspects of erotic censorship. This is because of the gray area surrounding the portrayal of animated, fictional minors engaging in erotic or sexual acts.

The legality of pornography with non-animated individuals is only slightly more definitive. Legal and moral issues regarding pornography and erotica can tie into arguments regarding the legalization or decriminalization of prostitution and sex work at large, a topic that is hotly debated. Pornography is often far less regulated than sex work and has fewer legal barriers to production, though it is still a morally controversial profession to some.

In the United Kingdom, the Obscene Publications Act 1857 made the selling of "obscene" materials a statutory offense. This act has been criticized heavily, not just in retrospect, but at the time of enacting. Topics of erotic media have been brought to U.S. state and federal courts for centuries. Some notable cases include People v. Freeman, in which the state of California upheld that hiring actors to engage in sexual activity for the sake of creating erotic films was not considered pornography, and Miller v. California, in which the idea of erotic work providing serious artistic or literary value was introduced to the legal sphere.

=== Feminism ===
For the feminist anti-pornography activist Andrea Dworkin, "Erotica is simply high-class pornography; better produced, better conceived, better executed, better packaged, designed for a better class of consumer." Feminist writer Gloria Steinem distinguishes erotica from pornography, writing: "Erotica is as different from pornography as love is from rape, as dignity is from humiliation, as partnership is from slavery, as pleasure is from pain." Steinem's argument hinges on the distinction between reciprocity versus domination, as she writes: "Blatant or subtle, pornography involves no equal power or mutuality. In fact, much of the tension and drama comes from the clear idea that one person is dominating the other."

A majority of erotica centers women as the object of sexual desire, demonstrated in the sharp rise of popularity of pornographic magazines centering women in the mid-twentieth century. In the 20th century, a cadre of female artists, authors, and other creatives began to create a new kind of erotica.

Women's erotica exists to cater for the sexual gratification of women consuming erotic material. Feminist erotic media often centers female pleasure instead of catering to the male gaze. Feminist erotic art had a boom in the mid-20th century, most iconically transforming the idea of the nude female figure from an object of sexual pleasure to a symbol for a woman's sexual liberation. Martha Edelheit was a pioneer of modern women's erotica, flipping the genre on its head by focusing her art on the nude male figure. It was not unusual for a man to be seen as an object of sexual desire in erotic media, but these portrayals were often found in gay pornography, and were often created or published by another man. Edelheit's work as a woman and as an artist was foundational for modern-day feminist erotic media.

== See also ==
- Child erotica
- Dinosaur erotica
- History of erotic depictions
- Homoeroticism
- Lists of erotic films
- Victorian erotica
