= Monica Padman =

American podcaster and actor

- Born: August 24, 1987 (age 39); Duluth, Georgia, U.S.
- Education: University of Georgia (BA, ABJ); Duluth High School
- Occupations: Actor; writer; producer; podcast host
- Years active: 2010–present
- Height: 5 ft (152 cm)

Monica Padman is an American podcaster, actor, and producer. She co-created and co-hosts the podcast Armchair Expert with Dax Shepard. As an actor, she has appeared in films and television shows including CHiPs, The Good Place, Rutherford Falls, and Ryan Hansen Solves Crimes on Television.

== Early life and education ==
Padman was born in Duluth, Georgia, to a Malayali engineer father and a computer programmer mother. Her mother moved to the United States from India at the age of six, and her father moved to the United States from India as a college student for educational opportunities. While attending Duluth High School, Padman took Advanced Placement classes and was on the cheerleading squad- where she served as a flyer. During her time at DHS, Padman and her team secured two state championships in cheerleading. Padman graduated from Duluth High School in 2006 and attended the University of Georgia on the Hope Scholarship, which is a merit-based scholarship funded by the Georgia Lottery.

Padman cites her love of the show Friends and the film Good Will Hunting as making her want to become an actor when she was in eighth grade. She began studying theater in high school and, in college at the University of Georgia, she double-majored in theater and public relations, choosing the latter in order to placate her parents. Padman completed an internship at the Radmin Company while in college. She graduated in 2009 from UGA with a 4.0 GPA with both BA and ABJ degrees and afterwards moved to Los Angeles.

== Career ==
In 2011, Padman moved to Los Angeles to pursue an acting career. She trained in improvisational comedy at the Upright Citizens Brigade, and supported herself by babysitting and working at the front desk at SoulCycle. Padman met Kristen Bell and Dax Shepard through social circles, then coincidentally booked an acting job on an episode of House of Lies playing an assistant to Bell's character. Bell subsequently hired Padman to occasionally babysit for them, and Padman eventually became their full-time nanny. Her role gradually evolved into serving as an assistant to Bell and then becoming a professional partner to both Bell and Shepard. In 2019, Bell referred to Padman as her "chief of staff".

During this time, Padman booked several major commercial campaigns including Geico and Herbal Essence. She also had appearances in shows and a movies affiliated with Dax and Kristen Bell. Her professional relationship also continued to develop with the couple, and she began writing things for Kristen Bell and helping to produce content, like Momsplaining with Kristen Bell.

=== Armchair Expert ===
Padman is the co-creator of the podcast Armchair Expert with Dax Shepard, which evolved from Padman's and Shepard's habit of debating ideas on the back porch of Shepard and Bell's home. The show launched on February 14, 2018, and focuses on in-depth conversations about guests' upbringings, challenges and successes. Episodes typically run 90–120 minutes, ending with a fact check, in which Padman and Shepard discuss the show after Padman has researched any verifiable claims made by Shepard or their guests during the interview. The fact check typically lasts about 30 minutes, often straying into personal anecdotes and featuring Padman more heavily than the interview portion of the show. Padman has said she felt anxiety early on about whether her voice was being heard enough on the podcast, particularly when their guests were Hollywood figures who could potentially aid her acting career, but eventually she realized, "I don't need to prove myself to any of these people. I can just be." In addition to her role as co-host, she also edits each episode and books guests.

Featured guests have included celebrities such as Kristen Bell, Ashton Kutcher, Will Ferrell, Kumail Nanjiani, and Julia Louis-Dreyfus. On June 7, 2018, the show released their first episode of "Experts on Expert", a recurring series of interviews in which Padman and Shepard interview experts in their fields. Featured experts on the show have included Bill Gates, Ibram X. Kendi, and Atul Gawande. In 2018, Apple named Armchair Expert among its top 15 podcasts of the year. On iTunes, Armchair Expert was the most downloaded new podcast of the year.

On February 14, 2020, the first of a ten-episode series within Armchair Expert was released called "Monica and Jess Love Boys". The series follows Padman and her friend and co-host Jess Rowland as they consult a variety of sex and relationship experts to improve their personal love lives, including joining the celebrity dating app Raya. The final episode of the mini-series aired April 15, 2020.

In May 2021, Padman and Shepard signed a deal with Spotify to have all episodes of their show exclusively available on the streaming platform.

Padman also co-hosted the podcast Synced, under the Armchair Expert umbrella, with journalist Liz Plank until October 2024.

In 2026, Armchair Expert was nominated for a Golden Globe in the 'Best Podcast' category.

== Filmography ==
Year	Title	Role
2010	Drop Dead Diva	Emma
2014	House of Lies	Assistant
2014	HelLA	Annoying Actress
2015	This Is Why We're Single	Roommate
2016	On the Bright Side	Groupie #1
2017	My Boyfriend Is a Robot	Waitress
2017	CHiPs	Becky
2017	Ryan Hansen Solves Crimes on Television	Barista
2018	The Good Place	Eleanor-1
2019	Bless This Mess	Danika
2019	Justin & Jill's Drunk History: The Birth Story	Lizzie
2021	Tiny Kitchen Cook-Off	Host
2021	Rutherford Falls	Melanie

== Awards and nominations ==
In 2019, Padman received an Emmy Award nomination for her work as a producer on Momsplaining, a web series hosted by Kristen Bell and airing on the YouTube channel of The Ellen DeGeneres Show.
