= Chatter: The Voice in Our Head =

2021 book by Ethan Kross

- Author: Ethan Kross
- Genre: Psychology
- Publisher: Crown Publishing Group
- Publication date: January 2021
- ISBN: 978-0525575238

Chatter: The Voice in Our Head, Why It Matters, and How to Harness It is a book by psychology professor Ethan Kross, published by Crown in January 2021. The book was praised by reviewers for its systematic clarity. The book explains how inner, silent dialogues are intrinsic to human nature, offering advice on how to avoid unproductive mental chatter, take advantage of inner dialogues to reflect on life's circumstances, and arrive at sound judgments for making decisions.
