= Monster girl =

Speculative fiction character trope

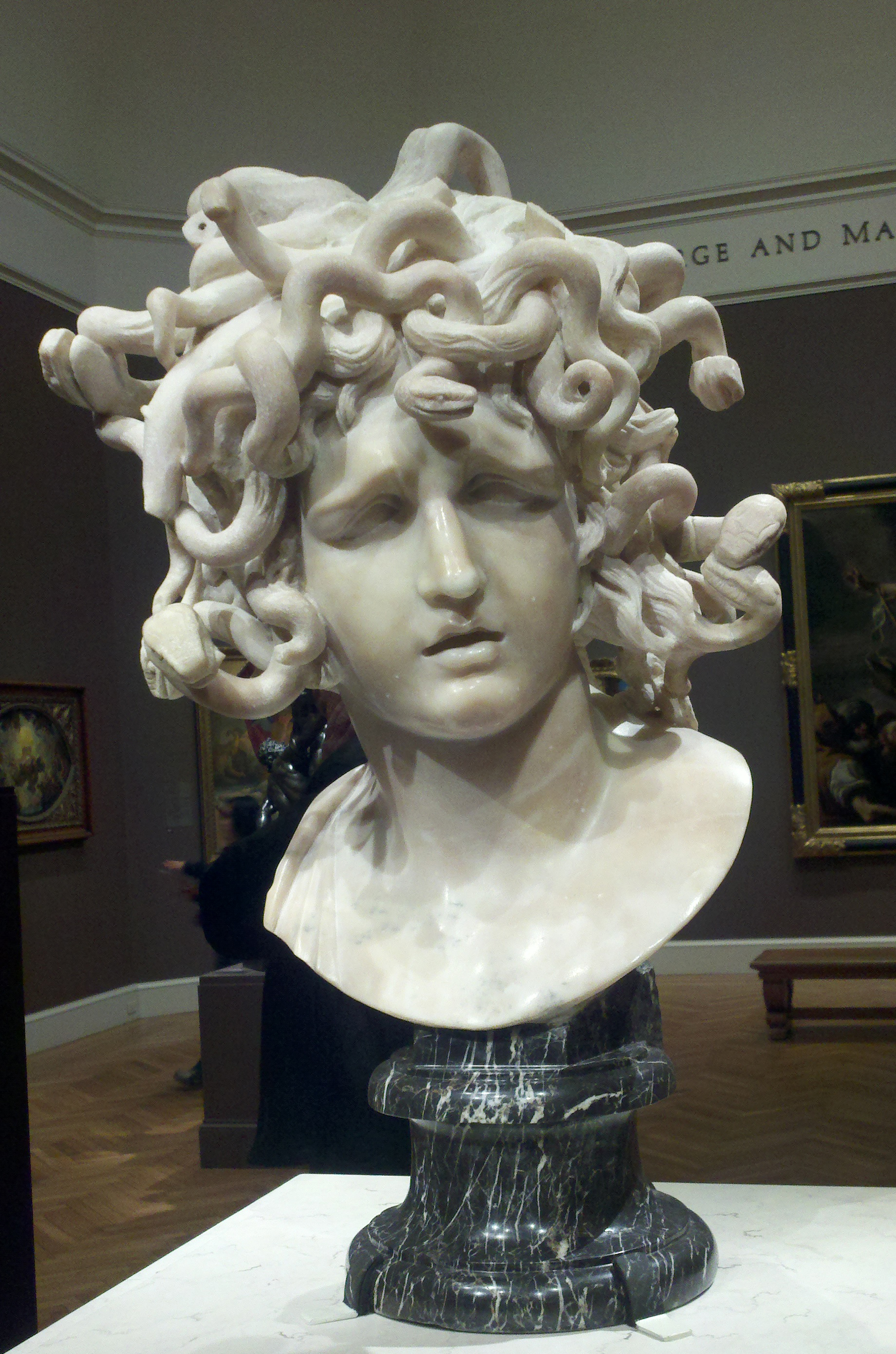
Medusa, ancient example of the monster girl trope, who is sometimes depicted as beautiful as well as fearsome

A monster girl is a fictional trope of a girl or young woman who is or shares visual traits with a monster. The trope is historically used strictly negatively and antagonistically as a representation of an ugly, cruel, or deceitful woman; such incarnations often have the woman hide her monstrous traits to deceive others. More recent works of media often depict monster girls neutrally, as merely another race of people, or positively, with their monstrous traits being a type of superpower they use to help others. Monster girls also feature prominently in anime and manga, in which their depiction ranges between humanization and body positivity as a form of female empowerment, to sexualized objectification as a form of monster erotica. Monstrous women and girls in popular culture become representatives of women who not only deviate from the norm, but stand out.

== Overview ==
Historically, media has depicted monstrous women as villains, or if not, then less monstrous than males of equivalent ability. In anime, the magical girl genre featured girls with transformation abilities, however, they depicted the heroines increasing in beauty as their power grew. Additionally, western superheroines were depicted with more sexualized transformations than their male counterparts, such as She-Hulk, who was depicted in revealing bodysuits even after transforming.

If a monster girl was not attractive, it usually indicated their powers had become too great for her to control, a trope that dates back thousands of years to Medusa and Scylla of Greek mythology. This ultimately reduced the complexity of these characters in comparison to their male counterparts, who had to grapple with their repulsive appearances.

More modern works have begun featuring heroines with beastly or terrifying transformations, one prominent example of which is Marceline the Vampire Queen from Adventure Time, who can turn into various demonic forms to help her friends. Other unsexualized "monster girl" characters include Kipo of Kipo and the Age of Wonderbeasts, a 13-year-old girl with mega jaguar transformation powers, Amanda (a.k.a. Monster Girl) from Invincible, who can transform into a giant, green, troll-like monster, and Iara Dos Santos of the Marvel Comics universe, who can become a humanoid great white shark.

== In horror ==
In an inversion to the horror movie trope of the final girl, the idea that the last survivor of the villain is a young woman, movies began depicting the monster itself as a woman. The trope saw its origins in Carrie (1976) and The Fury (1978), both movies with young women possessing telekinetic powers.

== In anime and manga ==
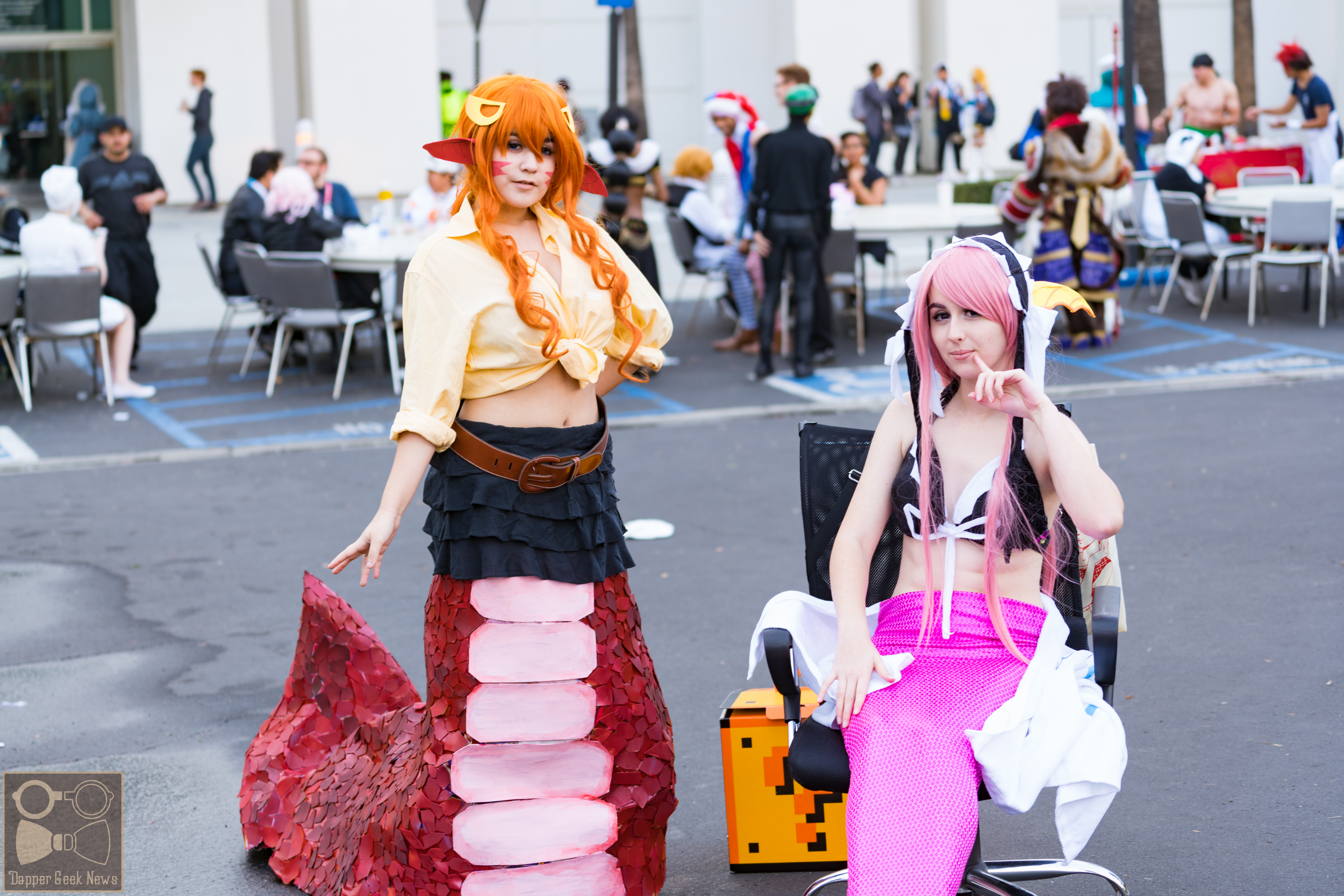
Cosplay of Miia and Meroune, lamia and mermaid monster girl characters from Monster Musume

A genre of anime and manga revolving around monster girls became popular following the success of such erotic series as Monster Girl Encyclopedia, Monster Girl Quest!, and Monster Musume. The latter in particular caused an "explosion" of new content. In these series, monster girls are usually depicted as moe anthropomorphic versions of mythological creatures that retain an attractive human appearance combined with varying monster features. Fans of monster girls in anime and manga profess that their unrestrained and powerful personalities set them apart, with some having a dominatrix-like appeal.

Other influential anime depicting monster girls is Kemono Friends, which has a large fan following due to the character designs and personalities. In contrast to the previously mentioned shows, Kemono Friends is not focused on the fetish aspect, but rather takes a more informative approach to the anthropomorphic characters, and has more of a children's show appearance.

The Monster Musume character Suu, in addition to other, similar characters from previous works such as Sailor Moon, inspired a further sub-fandom of slime girls, characters based on the Dungeons & Dragons monster of the same name, who are made of gelatinous material, but possess a humanoid female, rather than amorphous appearance.

== In video games ==
Critics have noted that many of the most famous female video game monsters, such as Vicar Amelia from Bloodborne, the Bubble Head Nurses of Silent Hill 2, and Anima from The Evil Within, were formerly humans or take the general shape of one. In most cases, this is done to challenge male players' expectations of what types of women exist in a video game. The characters use their femininity as a tool in order to draw the player in before showing their true monstrous form, as in Vicar Amelia's transformation from a "little praying woman" into a beast. However, the Nurses are an exception as they "slyly beg for slaughter" instead of drawing the player towards their own.

There are also numerous monster girl eroge such as Monster Girl Quest and Demons Roots. While erotic in nature, these games have also been praised for the strong writing of their monster girl characters.

== See also ==
- Kemonomimi – Form of anthropomorphism in anime and manga
- Paranormal romance – Subgenre of romantic fiction and speculative fiction
- Monster erotica – Erotic literature involving monsters
- Superheroine – Type of character
- Teratophilia – Sexual attraction to monsters
