= Chuck Tingle =

Pseudonymous American erotic writer

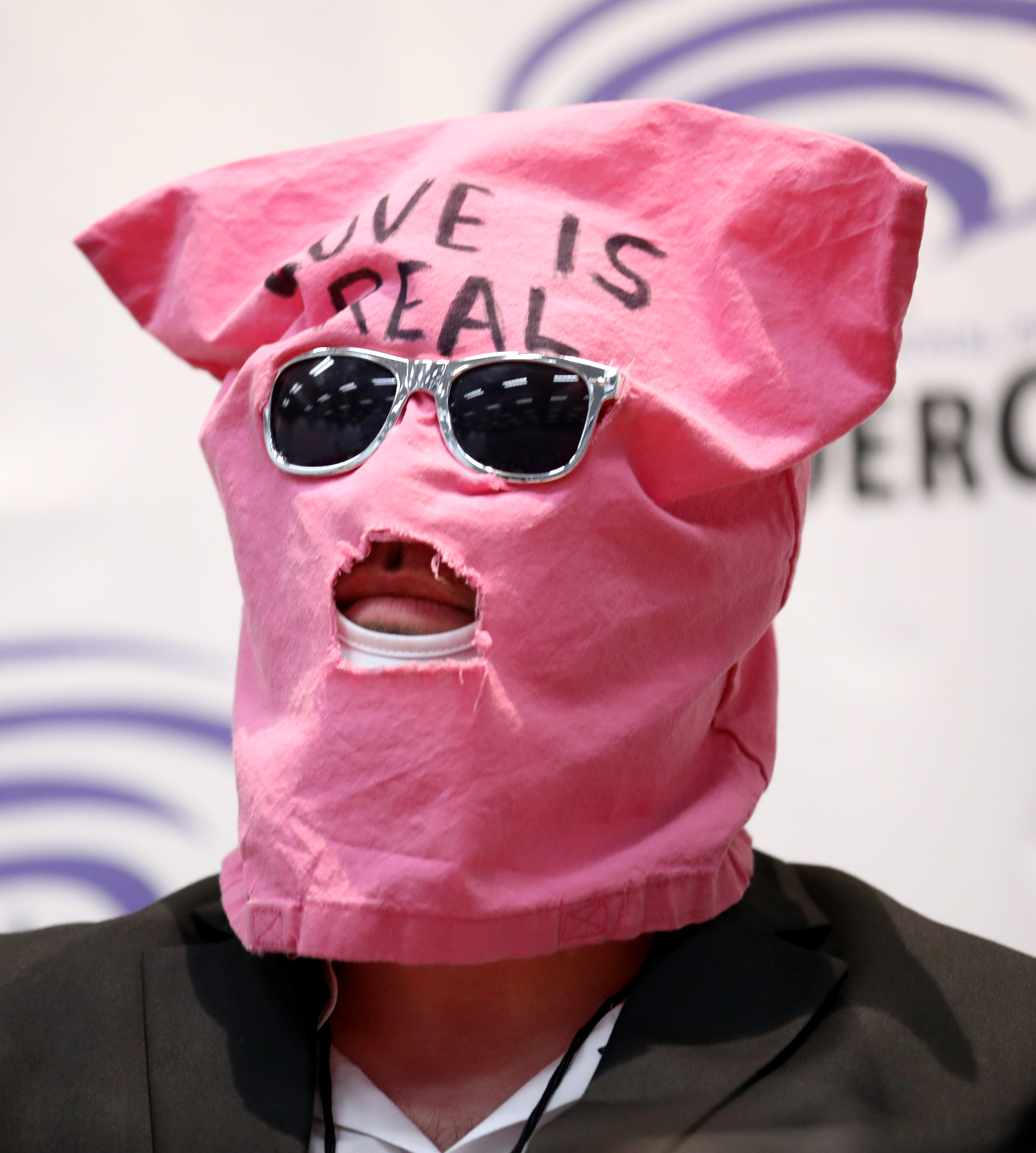
- Tingle at the 2024 WonderCon
- Writing career
- Pen name: Dr. Chuck Tingle
- Language: English
- Years active: 2014–present
- Genres: Erotica; satire; horror fiction
- Website: www.chucktingle.com

Chuck Tingle is a pseudonymous author, primarily of niche gay erotica. His stories mainly take the form of monster erotica, featuring romantic and sexual encounters with dinosaurs, imaginary creatures, anthropomorphized inanimate objects, and even abstract concepts. Most of his works are self-published through Amazon, primarily as ebooks, but also as paperbacks and audiobooks. Some works are sold through Macmillan Publishing, while others are sold through Tor Publishing Group. In 2016, his short story Space Raptor Butt Invasion was a finalist for the Hugo Awards as the result of a coordinated campaign which he disavowed. In the following year's awards, he was a finalist for the Best Fan Writer award.

== Personal life ==
Little has been confirmed about Tingle's identity, beyond the fact that "Chuck Tingle" is a pseudonym. A photo presented as a portrait of Tingle was found on a stock photo web site. When appearing in person, Tingle maintains his anonymity by wearing sunglasses over a pink sack on his head, which has "love is real" written on it in black marker.

Tingle presents himself as a taekwondo grandmaster who was born in Home of Truth, Utah (a ghost town established in 1933 as a religious commune and abandoned in 1977), acquired a PhD in holistic massage at DeVry University (which does not offer such a degree), and now lives in Billings, Montana. Tingle is autistic, bisexual, and has a son named Jon. In a 2022 Tumblr post, Tingle discussed possibly identifying as transgender, explaining that while he did not experience physical gender dysphoria, "in a purely technical and utilitarian sense of A PLUS B then YES, male would not be my preferred gender".

In 2016, a person identifying himself as Jon stated in a Reddit "Ask Me Anything" session that he edits his father's work for publication and cares for him. Jon made a number of claims that have remained unconfirmed or been denied by Tingle himself, including that Tingle is a savant and that the anthropomorphism found in many of Tingle's works reflects "identity issues that he has been working through his whole life".

== Career ==
Tingle began self-publishing erotic fiction through Amazon's ebook service in 2014, with the titles My Billionaire Triceratops Craves Gay Ass, Pounded by President Bigfoot, and Taken by the Gay Unicorn Biker. His work includes erotic encounters with personifications of inanimate objects, such as I'm Gay for My Living Billionaire Jet Plane and Creamed in the Butt by My Handsome Living Corn. Other titles feature abstract concepts as sexual partners or involve metatextual references, such as Angry Man Pounded by the Fear of His Latent Gayness over a Dinosaur Transitioning into a Unicorn, Slammed in the Butt by My Hugo Award Nomination, and Pounded in the Butt by My Book "Pounded in the Butt by My Book 'Pounded in the Butt by My Book "Pounded in the Butt by My Own Butt"'" (referring to a series of previous publications). Tingle often incorporates current news stories or public figures into his titles, using sound-alike or look-alike names, such as Domald Tromp's Ass is Haunted by the Handsome Ghost of His Incriminating Tax Returns (parodying Donald Trump) and Billionaire Elons Mugg Takes the Handsome Planet Mars in his Butt (parodying Elon Musk).

Tingle refers to his stories as "Tinglers". Although they typically feature apparently cisgender male couples, stories also feature bisexual, lesbian, and trans characters. He stresses the consensuality of the encounters, and the stories end happily with "an optimistic, philosophical moral about love and togetherness". Tingle says he uses Photoshop software to create his own book covers, which usually feature a photo of a muscular, bare-chested man juxtaposed with an image of the entity whose sexual escapades are featured in the story. In 2019, Tingle was one of the special guests featured on a benefit livestream for the British transgender youth support charity Mermaids hosted by YouTuber Hbomberguy. A few days later, Tingle published a book entitled Pounded in the Butt By the Handsome Sentient Manifestation of My Twitch Stream.

=== Hugo Award nominations ===
In 2016, Tingle's Space Raptor Butt Invasion was a finalist for the Hugo Award for Best Short Story. This stemmed from a voting campaign by the alt-right "Rabid Puppies," a faction of the Sad Puppies campaign that opposed diversity and "political correctness" in the Hugo Awards. However, Tingle disavowed the campaign, saying via Twitter that it was the work of "devils" and that Zoë Quinn would accept the award on his behalf if he were to win. Space Raptor Butt Invasion did not win the award, and he subsequently published Pounded in the Butt by My Hugo Award Loss. In 2017, he was a finalist for a second Hugo Award, this time for Best Fan Writer. He again did not win, and later published Pounded in the Butt by My Second Hugo Award Nomination.

=== Mainstream publications ===
In July 2022, Tor Books signed Tingle to a two-book deal under its Nightfire horror imprint. The first book, Camp Damascus, was published in July 2023. It reached number 32 on the USA Today bestseller list on July 26, 2023. Camp Damascus explores themes of religious extremism, conversion camp, and neurodivergency. In a review for PRIDE, Derry Paver wrote, "This is the kind of horror literature that is both timeless and yet perfectly descriptive of the sad state of the world today for LGBTQ+ people." Camp Damascus was nominated for the Bram Stoker Award for Best Novel.

Bury Your Gays was published in July 2024. Library Journal reviewed Bury Your Gays positively, writing:

Tingle’s (Camp Damascus) latest outing is another refreshingly original look at horror, this time mixed in with algorithmic art, commodification of identity, and coercive capitalism. His hallmark inventiveness with structure, trope, and genre come through clearly here and are balanced perfectly. Nods to fandoms that have experienced “buried gays” are sprinkled throughout the book, and love in all forms—platonic, romantic, and everything between—remains the way to beat evil. Terror comes as much from being forced into a stereotype as from being killed by a cinematic villain.

Bury Your Gays won the 2025 Locus Award for Best Horror Novel. It was a finalist for the 2025 Lambda Literary Award for Speculative Fiction.

== Selected works ==
The following is a representative sample of Tingle's hundreds of works.

=== Horror ===
- Straight (2021)
- Camp Damascus (2023)
- Bury Your Gays (2024)
- Lucky Day (2025)
- Fabulous Bodies (2026)

=== Romance novels and novellas ===
- Helicopter Man Pounds Dinosaur Billionaire Ass (A Novel) (2015)
- Buttageddon: The Final Days of Pounding Ass (A Novel) (2015)
- My Billionaire Triceratops Craves Gay Ass (2014)
- Taken by the Gay Unicorn Biker (2014)
- I'm Gay for My Living Billionaire Jet Plane (2015)
- Glazed by the Gay Living Donuts (2015)
- Bigfoot Sommelier Butt Tasting (2015)
- Space Raptor Butt Invasion (2016)
- Pokebutt Go: Pounded by 'Em All (2016)
- Slammed in the Butthole by My Concept of Linear Time (2016)
- Bisexual Mothman Mailman Makes a Special Delivery in Our Butts (2020)
- I Have No Butt and I Must Pound (2021)
- Pounded in the Butt by My Handsome Sentient Library Card Who Seems Otherworldly but in Reality Is Just a Natural Part of the Priceless Resources Our Library System Provides (2022)
- This Lesbian Hot Dog Gets Me Off Also She Is a Doctor Also She Is Vegan (2025)

Harry Potter parody

- Trans Wizard Harriet Porber and the Bad Boy Parasaurolophus: An Adult Romance Novel (2020)
- Trans Wizard Harriet Porber and the Theater of Love: An Adult Romance Novel (2021)

Platonic

- My Butt Is Comforted by the Realization That I'm Okay and Everything Will Be Alright (2017)
- Not Pounded in the Butt by Anything and That's Okay (2018)
- Not Pounded by Anything While I Practice Responsible Social Distancing (2020)
- Absolutely No Thoughts of Pounding During My Fun Day with This Kind T-Rex Because I'm Aromantic and Asexual and That's a Wonderfully Valid Way of Proving Love Is Real (2021)

Satire

- Oppressed in the Butt by My Inclusive Holiday Coffee Cups (2015)
- Pounded by the Pound: Turned Gay by the Socioeconomic Implications of Britain Leaving the European Union (2016)
- Domald Tromp Pounded in the Butt by the Handsome Russian T-Rex Who Also Peed on His Butt and Then Blackmailed Him with the Videos of His Butt Getting Peed On (2017)
- My Handsome Sentient Face Mask Protects Me Despite the Ridiculous Conspiracy Theories That He Won't Also He Pounds My Butt (2020)
- Not Pounded By Romance Wranglers of America Because Their New Leadership Is from the Depths of the Endless Cosmic Void (2020)

Self-referential

- Buttception: A Butt Within a Butt Within a Butt (2015)
- Pounded in the Butt by My Book "Pounded in the Butt by My Own Butt" (2015)
- Turned Gay by the Existential Dread That I May Actually Be a Character in a Chuck Tingle Book (2016)
- Living Inside My Own Butt for Eight Years, Starting a Business and Turning a Profit Through Common Sense Reinvestment and Strategic Targeted Marketing (2016)
- Slammed in the Butt by My Hugo Award Nomination (2016)
- Pounded in the Butt by My Constantly Changing Thoughts on the Ongoing Mystery of Chuck Tingle's Real Identity (2016)
- Pounded in the Butt by My Book "Pounded in the Butt by My Book 'Pounded in the Butt by My Book "Pounded in the Butt by My Book 'Pounded in the Butt by My Book "Pounded in the Butt by My Own Butt"'"' (2017)
- Pounded in the Butt by the Handsome Sentient Manifestation of My Twitch Stream (2019)

Compilations

- Scary Stories to Tingle Your Butt: 7 Tales of Gay Terror (2015)
- Space Raptor Butt Trilogy (2016)
- Not Pounded by Anything: Six Platonic Tales of Non-Sexual Encounters (2019)
- Scary Stories to Tingle Your Lesbian Butt: Seven Tales of Ladybuck on Ladybuck Terror (2020)
- Pounded by the Classics: Seven Literary Tales of the Tingleverse (2021)

=== Other ===
- "Select Your Own Timeline" Adventures: Escape from the Billings Mall (2020), Expedition to the Frozen Lake (2021) [+4 others]
- Guides: Dr. Chuck Tingle's Complete Guide to Romance (2015), Sport (2016), The Void (2017), Film (2017), Time (2018)
- Dr. Chuck Tingle's Adult Coloring and Activity Book for True Buckaroos (2017)
- The Tingleverse: The Official Chuck Tingle Role-Playing Game (2019)

== Other projects ==
In 2016, Zoë Quinn announced an erotic adventure game collaboration with Tingle, with the working title Project Tingler. The game was finally named "Kickstarted in the Butt: A Chuck Tingle Digital Adventure" and a Kickstarter campaign was started in October 2016 asking for $69,420 to fund the project. The game raised over $85,000 from 2,450 backers in a couple of weeks. As of 2026, the game has not been released.

During the Donald Trump 2016 presidential campaign, Tingle created the website TrumpDebateFacts.com, which purported to fact-check various imaginary Trump claims, mostly attempts to hide Trump's supposed non-human origins (such as "I am not a poorly disguised mass of crabs wearing the skin of bloated human"). Tingle also released a number of satirical novellas featuring "Domald Tromp [sic]", including Slammed In The Butt By Domald Tromp's Attempt To Avoid Accusations Of Plagiarism By Removing All Facts Or Concrete Plans From His Republican National Convention Speech.

In 2018, a podcast titled Pounded in the Butt By My Own Podcast, based on Tingle's works, debuted in association with the producers of Welcome to Night Vale, a horror-fantasy podcast. Each episode is an audiobook version of one of Tingle's novellas, often read by an alum of the Night Vale podcast (including Cecil Baldwin and Mara Wilson). My Friend Chuck, a podcast co-hosted by Tingle and writer/comedian McKenzie Goodwin, aired from 2019 to 2020. Tingle has been a strong advocate for transgender rights. In 2020, he began publishing satires of the Harry Potter series featuring "Trans Wizard Harriet Porber" in response to J. K. Rowling's views on transgender topics. In 2022, he purchased the domain governorabbott.com and used it to protest Governor of Texas Greg Abbott's policies impacting transgender individuals. In 2025 he called into an episode of Everybody's Live with John Mulaney that was themed about dinosaurs.
