= Monster erotica =

Erotic literature involving monsters

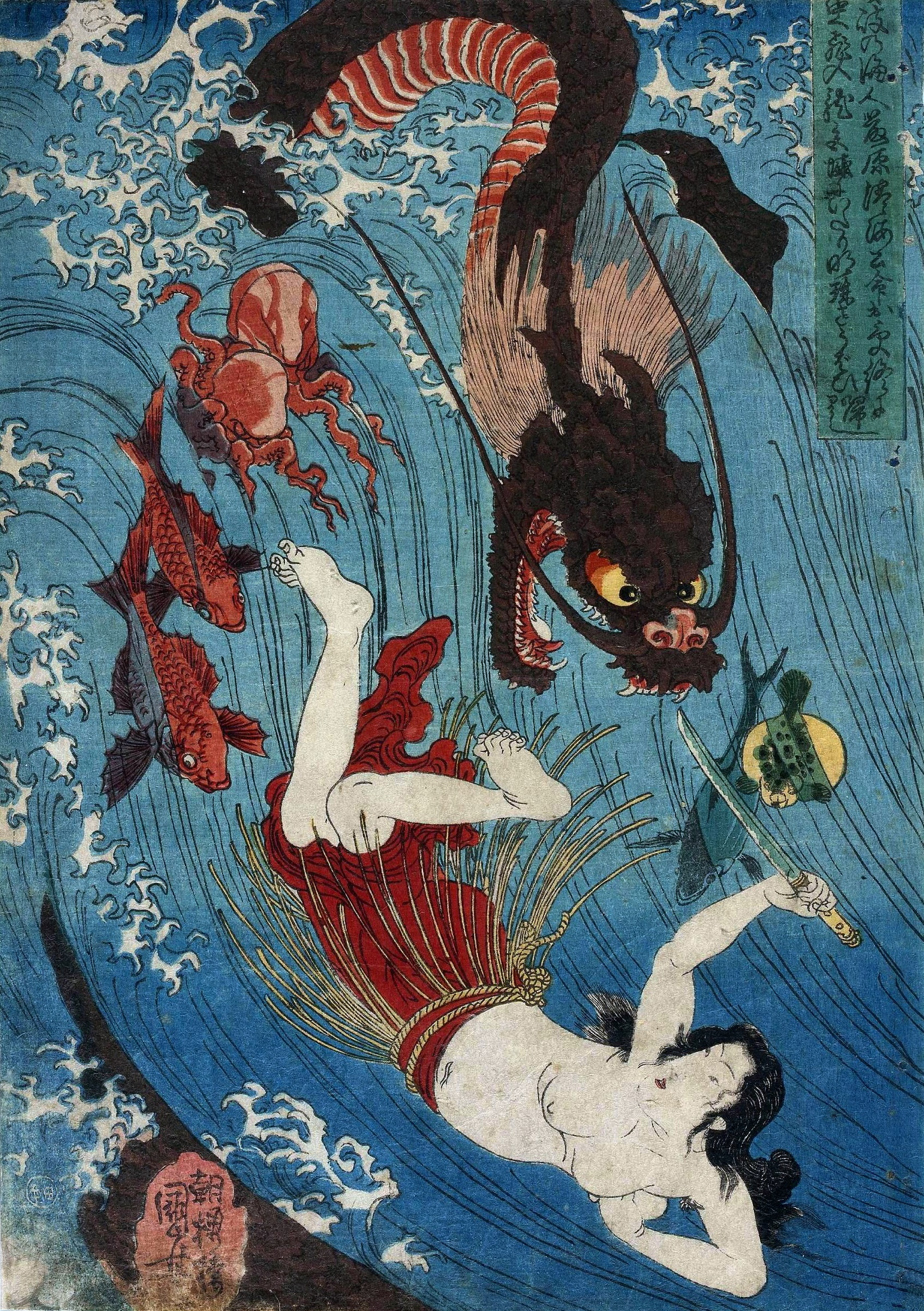
Tamatori escaping from the Dragon King by Utagawa Kuniyoshi, c. 1844

Monster erotica, also referred to as monster porn or cryptozoological erotica is a subgenre of erotic horror that involves sexual encounters between humans and monsters.

== Themes ==
The monsters featured in such works include dinosaurs (see dinosaur erotica), zombies, and extraterrestrials as well as folkloric, mythical and legendary beings such as yetis, Minotaurs and leprechauns. Titles typical of the genre include Cum For Bigfoot, Frankenstein's Bitch, Milked by the Aliens or Taken by the T-Rex.

Monster erotica writers argue that sex with monsters is different from sex with animals in that the monsters are portrayed as intelligent beings and as being in control of the encounter. However, erotic monster novels often feature non-consensual sex at least as regards the human participants.

In anime and manga, monster erotica or romance is somewhat more mainstream (e.g. in such titles as Monster Musume or Miss Kobayashi's Dragon Maid), and the relationship may be portrayed as more clearly consensual.

== History ==
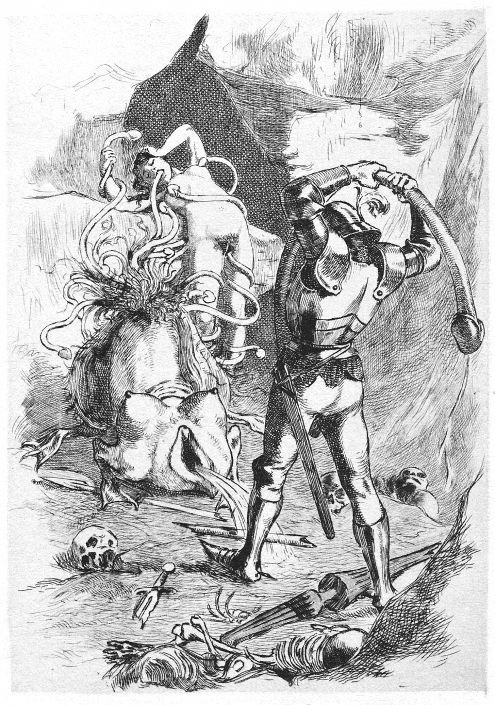
Illustration de La Grande Danse macabre des vifs, 1905

Scholars have identified erotic elements in horror novels featuring monstrous characters as far back as Carmilla (1872) by Sheridan Le Fanu and Dracula (1897) by Bram Stoker. Science fiction films sometimes dealt with monsters and sexuality, as in I Married a Monster From Outer Space (1958). As a distinct genre, however, monster erotica is a more recent development that found its audience on the internet after 2010. Most erotic monster novels are self-published. In 2013, none of the publishers contacted by Business Insider for an article about the genre responded when asked if they had been offered such works.

The monster erotica genre attracted public attention in the 2010s on account of the surprising popularity such novels obtained in English-language e-book stores. Following a series of media reports in the United Kingdom in 2013 about the easy availability of self-published e-books with depictions of rape, incest and bestiality, leading e-book retailers such as Amazon.com removed a great number of self-published erotica from their websites, including many erotic monster novels.

The genre again drew public attention when Denver Riggleman was elected to the U.S. House of Representatives in Virginia's 5th congressional district in 2018. His opponent accused him of being a "devotee of Bigfoot erotica", which he denied.

== See also ==
- Chuck Tingle – Pseudonymous American erotic writer, a notable writer of gay monster erotica
- Paranormal romance – Subgenre of romantic fiction and speculative fiction, romantic fiction involving supernatural beings such as vampires
- Teratophilia – Sexual attraction to monsters
- Tentacle erotica – Sensual art genre involving tentacles or pseudopods
- Zombie pornography – Pornography involving zombies
- Monster girl – Speculative fiction character trope
