= Exophilia =

Fetishism of extraterrestrials

An artistic depiction of a human-alien relationship

Exophilia is "a fetishism whose object is the sexuality of extraterrestrials." The term was coined by Keith "Supervert" Seward in his 2001 book Extraterrestrial Sex Fetish. The desire to have sex with aliens is also sometimes called xenophilia.

== Popular culture ==
=== Erotica and pornography ===
In July of 2019, Pornhub reported a significant increase in searches for "Area 51" along with other alien-related search terms. They also reported that women were 33% more likely to view alien-related content on their site and that "alien" was the second most popular search term in 2019.

=== Film and TV ===
Romantic and sexual relationships between humans and aliens have been portrayed in movies like My Stepmother Is An Alien and Earth Girls are Easy.

In the series Sex Education the side character Lily has sexual fantasies about aliens, and also writes and draws alien erotica. This depiction has been praised for being a positive portrayal of non-normative sexual interests.

=== Literature ===
The Lilith's Brood series by Octavia E. Butler contains several well-known sex scenes between humans and aliens.
