= Susan David =

South African psychologist (born 1970)

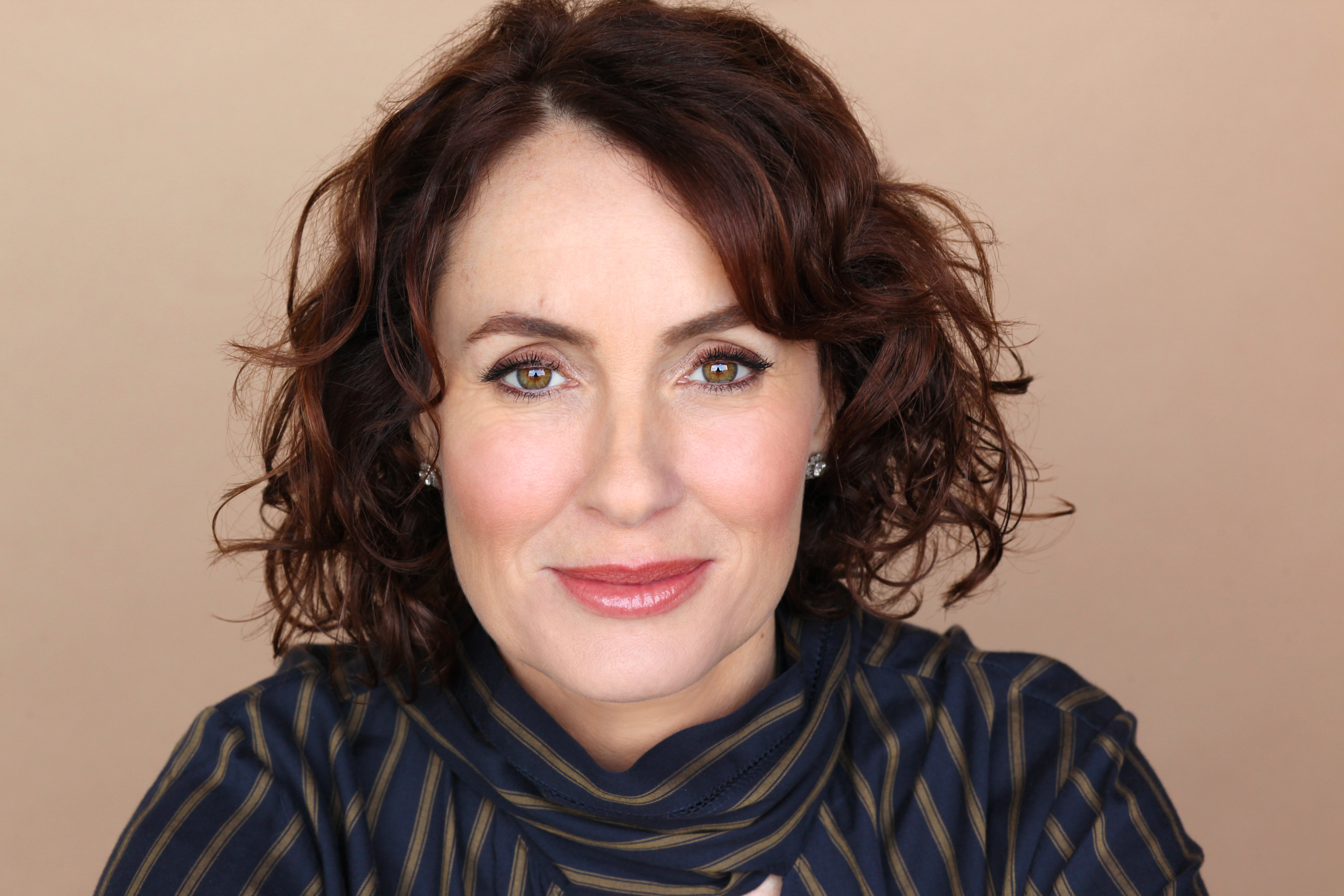
- Susan David in 2017
- Born: 13 September 1970 (age 55); Gauteng, South Africa
- Education: University of Witwatersrand (BA, MA), University of Melbourne (PhD), Yale University (Postdoc)
- Occupations: Psychologist, author, speaker
- Years active: 1999–present
- Known for: Emotional Agility, TED Talk "The Gift and Power of Emotional Courage"
- Notable work: Emotional Agility (2016), Beyond Goals (2013), The Oxford Handbook of Happiness (2013)
- Awards: Best Business Management Idea of the Year (2016), Books for a Better Life Award (2016), Thinkers50 Breakthrough Idea (2017), Axiom Business Book Award (2017)
- Website: susandavid.com

Susan A. David (born 13 September 1970) is a South African psychologist, speaker and author.

== Early life ==
David was born in 1970, in Gauteng, South Africa. She attended Waverly Girls High School from 1984 to 1988. David received her BA in Applied Psychology & English (1992), Honors in Applied Psychology (1995), and her MA in Psychology (2000) from the University of Witwatersrand in Johannesburg. David got a PhD in clinical psychology from the University of Melbourne. David then conducted post-doctoral research in emotions at Yale University.

== Career ==
David founded the management consulting firm Evidence Based Psychology in 1999 and serves as its CEO. David co-founded the Harvard/McLean Institute of Coaching in 2009 and served as co-director. David edited the 2013 books Beyond Goals and The Oxford Handbook of Happiness. David wrote the self-help book Emotional Agility, which was published with Penguin Random House in 2016. Emotional Agility talks about the concept of productively managing and accepting emotions. Emotional Agility reached #1 on The Wall Street Journal bestseller list. The concept of emotional agility was named as the best business management idea of the year by Harvard Business Review. David gave a TED talk in January 2018 called "The Gift and Power of Emotional Courage". By the end of 2018 it had 6 million views on the TED website.

== Personal life ==
David lives in Boston, Massachusetts with her husband and two children.

== Awards ==
- 2016 Best Business Management Idea of the Year
- 2016 Books for a Better Life Award Winner | Psychology
- 2017 Thinkers50 Breakthrough Idea of the Year
- 2017 Axiom Business Book Award Medalist
