= Amishi Jha =

American neuroscientist

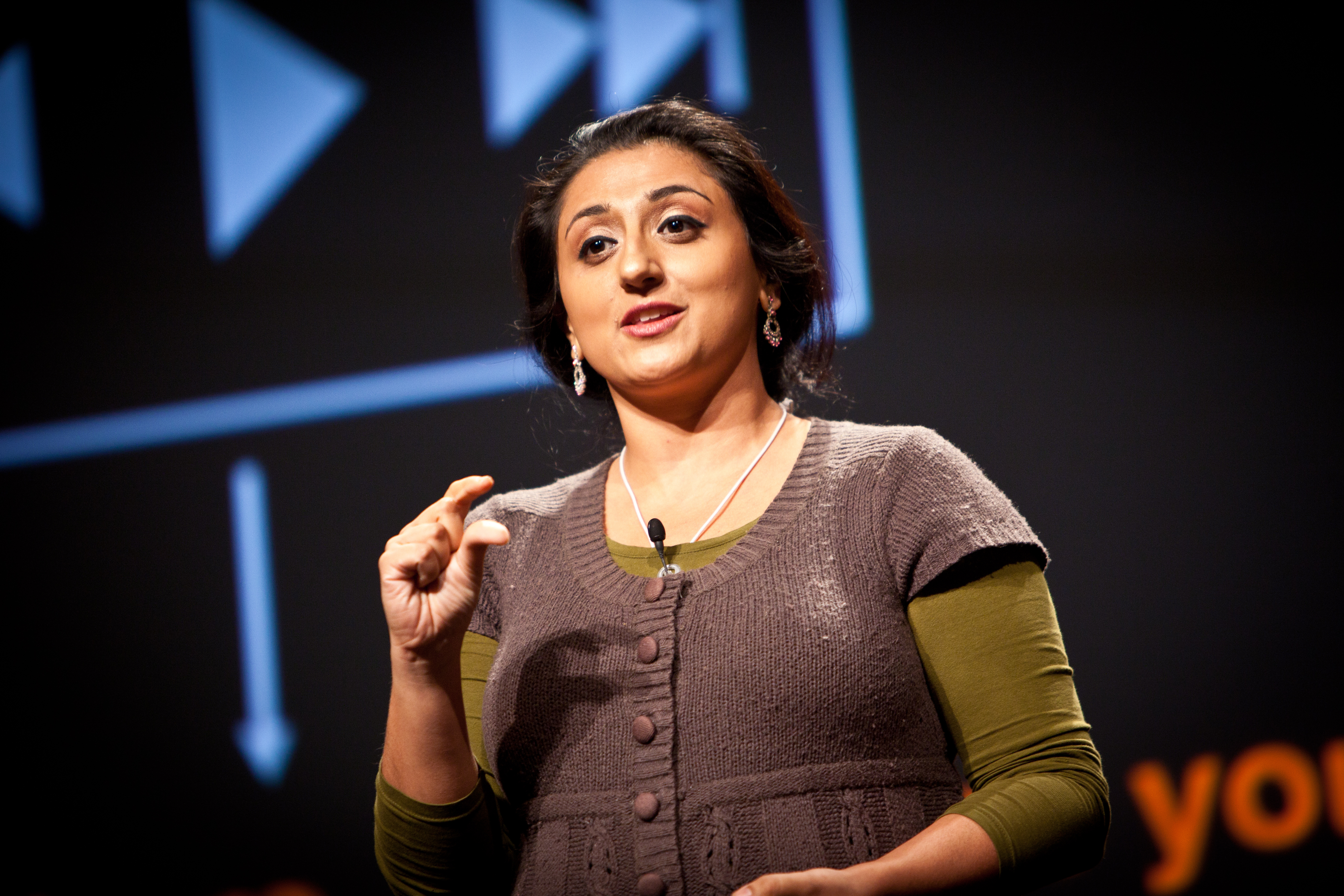
- Education: University of California, University of Michigan
- Known for: Cognitive neuroscience of attention, working memory, and mindfulness
- Awards: Poptech Science and Public Fellowship Leader, Charles Ludwig Award for Distinguished Teaching and Dean's Award for Innovation in Teaching from the University of Pennsylvania
- Scientific career
- Fields: Neuroscience, Psychology
- Workplaces: University of Miami

Amishi Jha is a professor of psychology at the University of Miami.

Jha's research on attention, working memory, and mindfulness has investigated the neural bases of executive functioning and mental training using various cognitive neuroscience techniques. Past studies have focused on the method by which attention selects information as relevant or irrelevant and how working memory then allows that information to be manipulated.

Jha's most recent research has examined mindfulness training with soldiers in the U.S. military with the Strong Projects as a tool in improving situational awareness and reducing stress measured through brainwave activity and cognitive behavioral tools. Her work has been featured in numerous publications. She has spoken at the World Economic Forum, the Aspen Institute, and the New York Academy of Sciences and has presented her research to the Dalai Lama and the Mind and Life Institute.

== Education ==
Jha received her B.S. in Psychology from the University of Michigan in 1993, and her PhD in psychology from the University of California-Davis in 1998. During graduate school, she worked with Michael Gazzaniga.

From 1998 to 2001, she completed her post-doctoral training in Neuroimaging and Functional MRI (fMRI) at Duke University with Gregory McCarthy.

== Career ==
=== University of Pennsylvania ===
From 2002 to 2010 she worked as an assistant professor at University of Pennsylvania at the Center for Cognitive Neuroscience and Department of Psychology.

=== University of Miami ===
In 2010 she joined the University of Miami as an associate professor in the Department of Psychology. Since arriving at the University of Miami, she has co-founded the Mindfulness Research and Practice Initiative and serves as the Director of Contemplative Neuroscience for that effort.

== Research ==
Jha has examined the executive functioning mechanisms of the brain such as attention, and working memory, utilizing functional magnetic resonance imaging, event related potential, electroencephalography, signal detection and behavioral methods. Her lab has investigated mindfulness training as a route to strengthen attentional processes as well as reduce perceived stress, and improve mood. Jha published one of the first studies on how attention may be modified by mindfulness training, and the first study of how mindfulness may protect against degradation in working memory in high stress groups, specifically military cohorts. Her research has followed two parallel lines of questioning – one seeking to determine the neural mechanisms of executive functioning and the other developing and evaluating ways to bolster executive functioning through training.

=== Findings ===
Jha's research into mindfulness-based training seeks to determine the benefits of mindfulness training and how this training changes cognitive and affective processes at neural and behavioral levels. Her findings have consistently shown that mindfulness training improves numerous aspects of both cognitive and emotional health. As well, she has demonstrated that there may be a dose-response effect of mindfulness training, so that greater benefits are observed with greater time spent engaging in mindfulness exercises. In terms of applications, Jha has presented at events focused on preventing burnout, where she highlighted its theoretical connection to attention span and the capacity to stay mentally aware.

==== Military ====
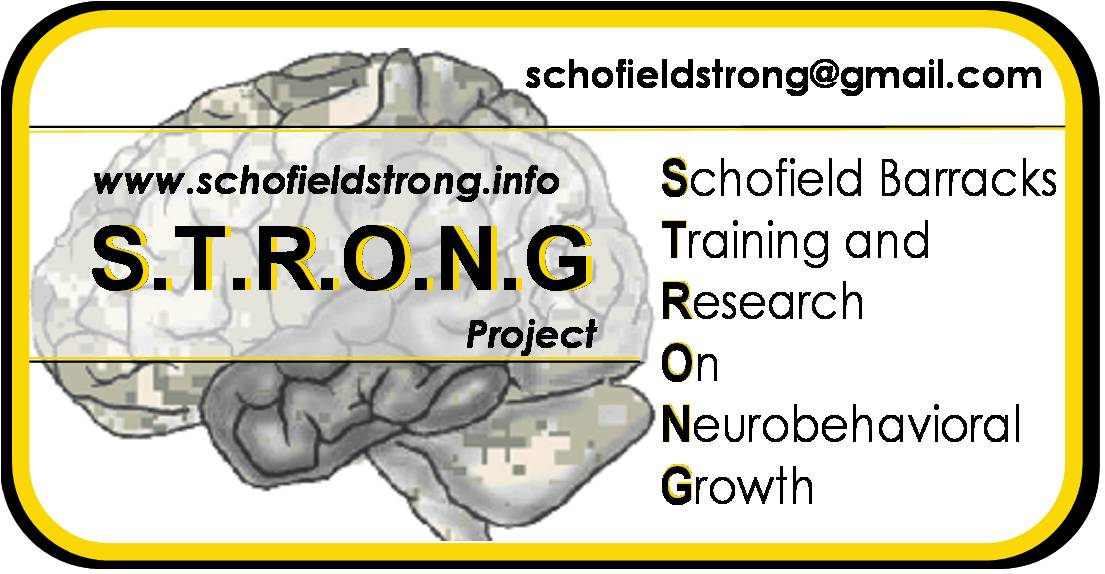
STRONG Project logo

Exposure to significant and potentially traumatizing stress is pervasive for military personnel during times of war. Such stress can lead to a degradation of psychological health with potentially dire consequences for the individual (e.g. PTSD), mission (e.g. impaired judgment), and family (e.g. divorce), amongst others. In some of the first studies of mindfulness training in the military, Jha partnered with the Mind Fitness Training Institute and training developed and delivered by Dr. Elizabeth Stanley of Georgetown University. An 8-week mindfulness training course was offered to Marines preparing to deploy to Iraq. She found that the more time Marines spent engaging in mindfulness exercises outside the classroom, the more they improved in their working memory and mood. Jha suggested that working memory capacity may be a core cognitive capacity necessary to preserve psychological resilience in high stress cohorts. These findings suggest that even in individuals facing extraordinary levels of stress, mindfulness training may help improve overall mental health and well-being.

==== Teachers ====
In a recent study with teachers, Jha and collaborators looked at whether mindfulness training would be effective at improving the mental well-being of elementary and secondary school teachers. Following the completion of the 8-week mindfulness training course, teachers reported less occupational stress, less occupational burnout, as well as lower symptoms of both depression and anxiety, while increasing their working memory capacity. Importantly, teachers who received mindfulness training continued to improve on all four measures over the three-month period following the completion of the course. This finding suggests that not only does mindfulness training have an immediate positive impact on emotional health but that the effects persist, providing long-term improvements in several aspects of well-being.

==== Children ====
Many types of contemplative practices, including mindfulness, train individuals to learn to control their attention, critical to success in a variety of settings, including school. In a recent study, Jha and colleagues sought to determine whether, and if so, how, concentrative meditation training can affect attentional processing in school age children. The results indicated that even in children as young as 13, meditation training improved children's ability to achieve and maintain alertness. Additionally, training improved children's ability to resolve conflicts between divergent actions, which may improving their ability to complete tasks as instructed. These findings suggest that meditation training may improve academic performance.

In another study in children who are part of the juvenile justice system, Jha and NYU collaborators investigated if mindfulness training vs. an active comparison training might protect against degradation in attention that may accompany being incarcerated. While those in the active comparison group degraded in their attention over a several month interval of being incarcerated, those in the mindfulness group did not. Again, Jha suggests that attention may serve as a core cognitive capacity necessary for resilience. In addition, attention is necessary for effective decision making under stress and regulation of behavior. Greater access to these capacities with mindfulness training may help promote resilience and reduce recidivism in children who have entered the juvenile justice system.

== Awards and honors ==
Jha is an internationally recognized speaker, having spoken at the World Economic Forum, the Huffington Post's first-ever conference on women, "The Third Metric: Redefining Success Beyond Money and Power", the Aspen Institute, and the New York Academy of Sciences. She covers many topics, from optimizing attention, building brain fitness, and mindfulness training, to protecting the brain from stress and aging. She has been interviewed on NPR-Morning Edition, July 26, 2005, CBS Miami, May 30, 2012, and the Huffington Post Live. Jha has also given a TED Talk, entitled "How to Tame Your Wandering Mind," in March 2017.

Her work has been featured in press articles, the most recent being a Miami Herald article titled "The Mind Tamer" as well as in the NY Times, The Washington Times, the Miami Herald, the Washington Post, Prevention Magazine, GQ and Newsweek.

From 2010 to 2012, Jha served as a research advisor for Goldie Hawn's Foundation.

Jha authored the cover story for the March 2013 issue of Scientific American Mind on mindfulness, and is a Mind and Life Institute Fellow. She is a member of the Cognitive Neuroscience Society, the Society for Neuroscience, and serves on the editorial boards of the Frontiers in Human Neuroscience, Frontiers in Cognitive Science, and Journal of Experimental Psychology: General.

Jha has won several awards for teaching and innovation in science, the most recent being a PopTech Science and Public Leadership Fellow in 2010. In 2007 she received the Charles Ludwig Teaching award and in 2009 the Dean's Innovation in Teaching Award, both from the University of Pennsylvania.
