= Liz Plank =

Canadian journalist and media personality

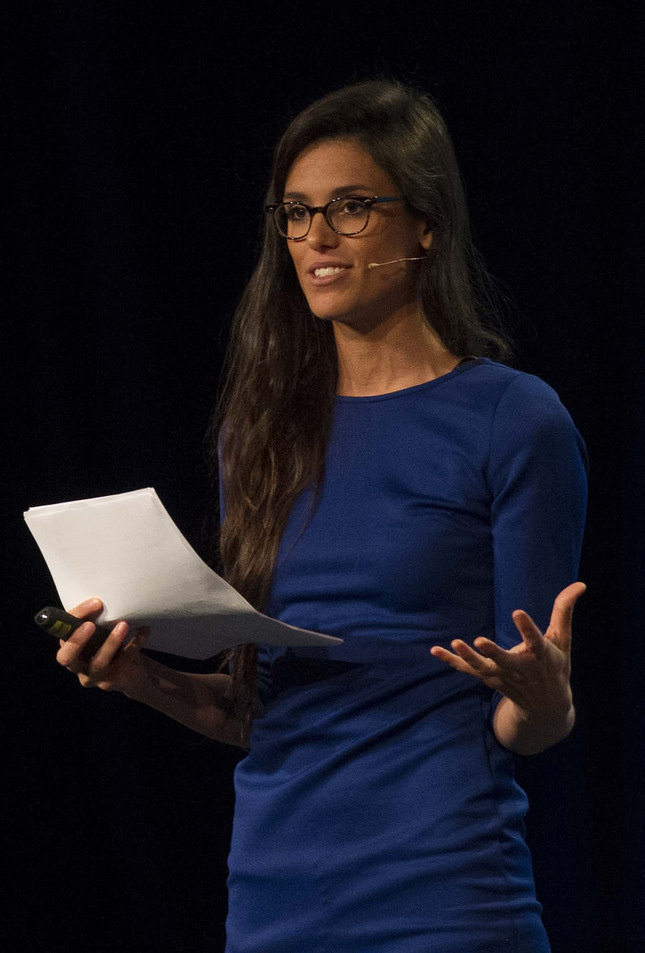
- in 2014
- Born: Elizabeth Plazie; March 19, 1987 (age 39); Montreal, Quebec, Canada
- Education: McGill University (BA); London School of Economics (MSc)
- Known for: Senior producer and correspondent at Vox
- Website: www.elizabethplank.com

Elizabeth Plank (born March 19, 1987) is a Canadian journalist, author, and media personality. She was a senior producer and political correspondent at Vox, and began hosting her journalism show called Positive Spin at NBC News in July 2020. She is a columnist for MSNBC.

== Early life ==
Plank grew up in Montreal. She worked as a community counsellor for people with developmental disabilities while attending McGill University, majoring in women's studies and international development. She received the Sheila Finestone Award, a prize given to an outstanding undergraduate student studying in the field of women's studies.

She received a master's degree at the London School of Economics and began writing articles about gender and human rights for the Huffington Post. While working as a research assistant for behavioral economics professor Paul Dolan, she launched a Change.org petition that succeeded in pressuring the Amateur International Boxing Association to overturn a decision requiring female boxers to wear skirts while competing at the 2012 London Olympic Games.

== Career ==
In 2013, Plank began her media career as an intern at the New York City-based Mic. She served as a correspondent and co-creator of the weekly video series "Flip the Script", which covered issues like feminism, homophobia and racism. Plank also served as a correspondent for the MSNBC live web show Krystal Clear.

Plank was recruited to cover the 2016 election for Vox Media, where she wrote, hosted, produced and starred in several critically acclaimed series about politics. She used her platform to elevate issues of gender equality, disability rights, transphobia and racial justice while interviewing political figures such as Prime Minister Justin Trudeau, Senator Cory Booker, Stacey Abrams and presidential candidate, Andrew Yang. In 2016, she produced and hosted 2016ish, an award-winning series about the presidential election, and gave a TEDxTalk at TEDxNormal that inspired her first book, For the Love of Men: A New Vision for Mindful Masculinity, published in October 2019. Plank appears on cable news offering political analysis.

Plank is recognized in gender policy and was ranked as one of Forbes 30 Under 30 in the Media category. Marie Claire ranked her among Mediaite's Most Influential in News Media and one of the 50 most influential women.

She sits on the board of Girl Up, a United Nations Foundation non-profit organization that unites girls to change the world and has spoken alongside Meghan Markle, Michelle Obama, and Priyanka Chopra at their annual summits.

Plank served as a co-host of the Man Enough podcast with Justin Baldoni and Jamey Heath where they interview influential figures about their journey to manhood. She left the podcast in December 2024 after Baldoni was sued by actress Blake Lively for sexual harassment.

In October 2024, Plank was involved in a controversial video segment with Michigan Governor Gretchen Whitmer promoting the CHIPS and Science Act, with Plank kneeling at Whitmer's feet receiving a Dorito chip. The video was criticized by some Catholics and conservative media outlets as mocking the Christian Eucharist, an unintended appearance for which Whitmer apologized.

In June 2025, Plank started a new podcast about relationships, Boy Problems, on Katie Couric Media.

== Books ==
Plank authored the book For the Love of Men: From Toxic to a More Mindful Masculinity ISBN 9781250196248, published by St. Martin's Press in 2019.
