= Dinosaur erotica =

Subgenre of erotic literature

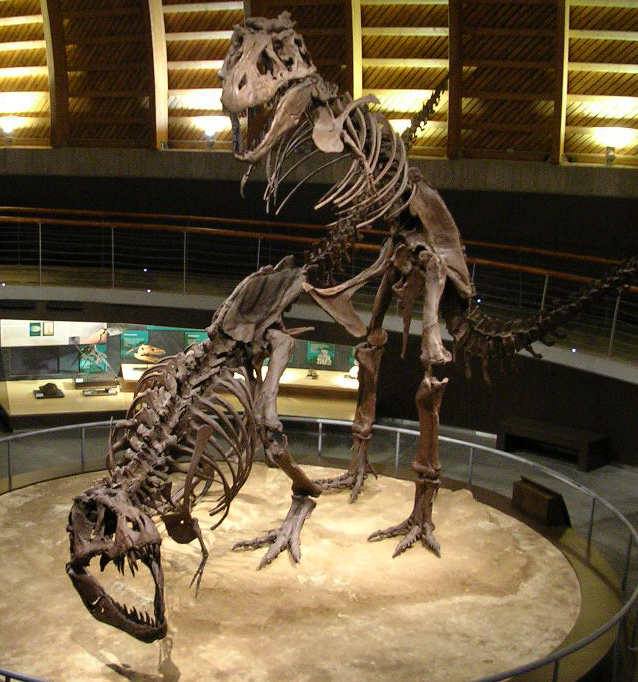
Two Tyrannosaurus Rex fossils posed so as to simulate copulation.

Dinosaur erotica, part of the larger genre of bestiality porn, is a subgenre of erotic literature that involves sexual encounters between humans and non-avian dinosaurs. Works include titles such as Taken by the T-Rex, Ravished by Triceratops and A Billionaire Dinosaur Forced Me Gay. Despite being called by some in the media "the Kardashian of erotica," the genre's titles have generated sales and media interest.

== Themes ==
Works of dinosaur erotica tend to be self-published short stories and often focus on common themes such as prehistoric female hunters who save their tribes from threatening (male) dinosaurs by having sex with them. According to Professor Clarissa Smith of the University of Sunderland, who co-edits the journal Porn Studies, dinosaur erotica is essentially an appeal to sexual fantasies: "The idea of having sex with [a dinosaur] is outside the realms of possibility. It's a bit like 'magic', where all rules become suspended, and for that reason it may well allow ... for kinds of imaginative risk-taking impossible in more standard couplings."

== Authors and works ==
Noted authors of dinosaur erotica include Christie Sims, Alara Branwen, Pippa Pout, Chuck Tingle and Hunter Fox (all pseudonyms). The genre was pioneered by Sims and Branwen, who were at Texas A&M University together when they came up with the idea. Sims' author biography claims that "while my outward tastes are relatively simple, my inner thoughts are filled with lusty thoughts of big, strong, powerful monsters having their way with beautiful maidens".

Her co-author Alara Branwen describes their source of inspiration in rather more mundane terms. She was working in a supermarket to help pay her bills when a co-worker mentioned how people were publishing fiction online and suggested that she should try writing erotica. After researching what sold well, she decided to experiment with the subgenre of monster erotica. Her first story, Doing the Dragon (involving a dragon having sex with a human girl), was a success and she was soon earning so much that she quit her supermarket job and went part-time at her college so that she could focus full-time on writing erotica together with Sims. One day, thinking about the movie Jurassic Park, she "pictured dinosaurs having their way with women. I died laughing. I was about to dismiss these thoughts as the workings of my freaky mind, but then I had an epiphany. Dinosaur erotica was something new that I'd never tried before." Dinosaur erotica is not the only genre tackled by the duo, who also write in other subgenres including "Dragon Beast Erotica", "Centaur Erotica" and "Dinosaur Beast Mating Erotica".

While Sims and Branwen's titles focus on heterosexual sex, gay dinosaur erotica also exists. The Guardian's columnist Damien Walter has published a review of Hunter Fox's short story A Billionaire Dinosaur Forced Me Gay by speculative fiction author Phronk. The review comments that the book "has no intrinsic redeeming qualities. It is horribly written, morally questionable, and even the sex in it seems like an afterthought ... It's the Kardashian of crappy erotica." Nonetheless, its mere success gives it meaning and appeal:

The title alone is delightful, tapping into deep-seated cynicism about post-50-Shades erotica and today's publishing industry. Its unjustifiably high Amazon ranking delights and frustrates traditional authors and self-published authors alike. And the horrid writing only underscores how ridiculous it is that this bizarre artifact even exists.

In 2016, Chuck Tingle's gay dinosaur erotica story "Space Raptor Butt Invasion" was a nominee for the Hugo Award for Best Short Story, the result of the "rabid puppies" campaign to discredit the Hugo awards.
