= Ethan Kross =

American psychologist, neuroscientist and writer

Ethan Kross is an American experimental psychologist, neuroscientist and writer, who specializes in emotion regulation. He is a professor of psychology and management at the University of Michigan and director of the Emotion & Self Control Laboratory there. Kross lives in Ann Arbor, Michigan.

== Early life and education ==
Kross was born and raised in Brooklyn, New York. He earned a degree from the University of Pennsylvania, a PhD in psychology from Columbia University, and a post-doctoral fellowship in social-affective neuroscience.

== Career ==
Since 2008, Kross has been at the University of Michigan, where he is now a professor of psychology and management. He founded the Emotion & Self Control Laboratory at the university and is its director. He studies the science of introspection, "the silent conversations people have with themselves: internal dialogues that powerfully influence how they live their lives."

A study by Kross and Philippe Verduyn of Leuven University in Belgium has shown that the more a person uses Facebook, the less satisfied they are with life. Other research by Kross and a colleague found that "the way that we process negative experiences can help reset that behavior." They found that when remembering a past experience, if people use self-distancing techniques—psychologically distancing themselves from a situation that is happening to them—"their stress levels and physical health indicators improved, and they were also better able to solve problems and resolve conflicts."

== Personal life ==
Kross lives in Ann Arbor, Michigan with his wife and two daughters.

== Publications ==
- Chatter: The Voice in Our Head and How to Harness It. London: Vermilion, 2021. ISBN 978-1785041952.
- Shift: Managing Your Emotions So They Don't Manage You. New York: Crown Publishing Group, 2025. ISBN 9780593444412
