= Rahul Jandial =

Doctor (born 1972)

- Jandial in 2018
- Born: December 25, 1972 (age 53)
- Education: University of California, Berkeley (B.A.) University of Southern California (M.D) University of California, San Diego (Ph.D)
- Occupations: Brain Surgeon, Scientist, Professor, Author
- Website: drjandial.com

Rahul Jandial is an American, dual-trained brain surgeon and neuroscientist. He is also a London Times bestselling & international bestselling author with his books translated into over 30 languages.

== Academic ==
Jandial's published research has appeared in journals such as Proceeding from the National Academy of Sciences. He has authored 10 academic books on topics ranging from neurosurgery to cancer biology and neuroscience.

As a professor he received the “distinguished professor award” from UCSD and has been invited as distinguished professor at Oxford and Harvard.

The Jandial laboratory at City of Hope Cancer Center in Los Angeles is funded by the US Department of Defense.

Jandial attended Compton Community College and earned his B.A from University of California, Berkeley — M.D. from the University of Southern California (USC), Los Angeles — Ph.D. from the University of California at San Diego (UCSD) — and cancer surgery specialization from the University of California San Francisco (UCSF).

== Author ==
In 2019, Penguin/Random House published Jandial's first book Life Lessons from a Brain Surgeon: The New Stories and Science of the Mind, a Sunday Times, and international bestseller translated into 10 languages.

In 2021, his memoir Life on a Knife’s Edge: A Brain Surgeon's Reflections on Life, Loss and Survival is translated to 8 languages.

This is Why You Dream: What Your Sleeping Brain Reveals About Your Waking Life was released in 2024 and is being translated to 30 languages.

He has been featured in The Times of London, the Telegraph, NY Mag, The Wall Street Journal, Der Spiegel, Cosmopolitan, Mr. Porter and GQ, and is an expert for Guardian Masterclasses.

== International service ==
He is the founder and co-director of International Neurosurgical Children's Association, where he leads teams to teach and perform pediatric brain surgery in charity hospitals throughout Central and South America, and Eastern Europe. The efforts were featured on ABC Nightline.

== Television ==
Since 2009, Jandial is a long-term contributor at KTLA-TV in Los Angeles. In 2019, he became a regular contributor to the TODAY Show in Australia. He hosted Brain Surgery Live on Nat Geo with Bryant Gumbell for international broadcast and was on FOX's primetime non-scripted Superhuman as a panelist. Brian Lowry, chief TV critic for Variety, called him the "world's most dashing neurosurgeon" in a highly positive review.

ABC news has called him the "real Dr. McDreamy" and VICE has featured and refers to him as the 100 percent emoji-human version.

He is represented by the talent agency - WME.

Harry Walker speaker's agency signed him in 2024.

== Books ==
- This Is Why You Dream: What Your Sleeping Brain Reveals About Your Waking Life, by Rahul Jandial, 2024
- Life on a Knife’s Edge: A Brain Surgeon’s Reflections on Life, Loss and Survival, by Rahul Jandial, 2021
- Life Lessons from a Brain Surgeon: The New Science and Stories of the Brain, by Rahul Jandial, 2019
- Core Techniques in Operative Neurosurgery, by Rahul Jandial, Paul McCormick, Peter M. Black, 2011, ISBN 978-1437737721
- Frontiers in Brain Repair, edited by Rahul Jandial, 2012 ISBN 978-1461425762
- Code Blue: Bedside Procedures and Critical Information, by Rahul Jandial and Danielle Jandial, 2014 ISBN 978-1576262535
- Metastatic Cancer: Clinical and Biological Perspectives, edited by Rahul Jandial, 2013 ISBN 978-1587066597
- Regenerative Biology of the Spine and Spinal Cord, edited by Rahul Jandial and Mike Y. Chen, 2012, ISBN 978-1461440895
- 100 Questions and Answers About Spine Disorders by Rahul Jandial, Henry E. Aryan, 2008, ISBN 978-0763749880
- 100 Questions and Answers About Head and Brain Injuries, by Rahul Jandial, Samuel A. Hughes, Charles B. Newman, 2008, ISBN 978-0763755720
- Neurosurgical Essentials, by Rahul Jandial, Henry E. Aryan, Peter Nakaji, 2004, ISBN 978-1576261828

== Awards ==
- The Sunday Times Bestselling Author 2019
- Department of Defense Breast Cancer Research Program Breakthrough Award 2015 and 2019
- Distinguished Teaching Award UC San Diego 2008
- Penfield Research Award from the Congress of Neurosurgeons 2007
- Cancer Research Award: STOPCancer Foundation: 2009
- Public Service Award, American Association of Neurological Surgeons, 2004
