= List of awards and nominations received by Benicio del Toro =

Benicio del Toro awards and nominations
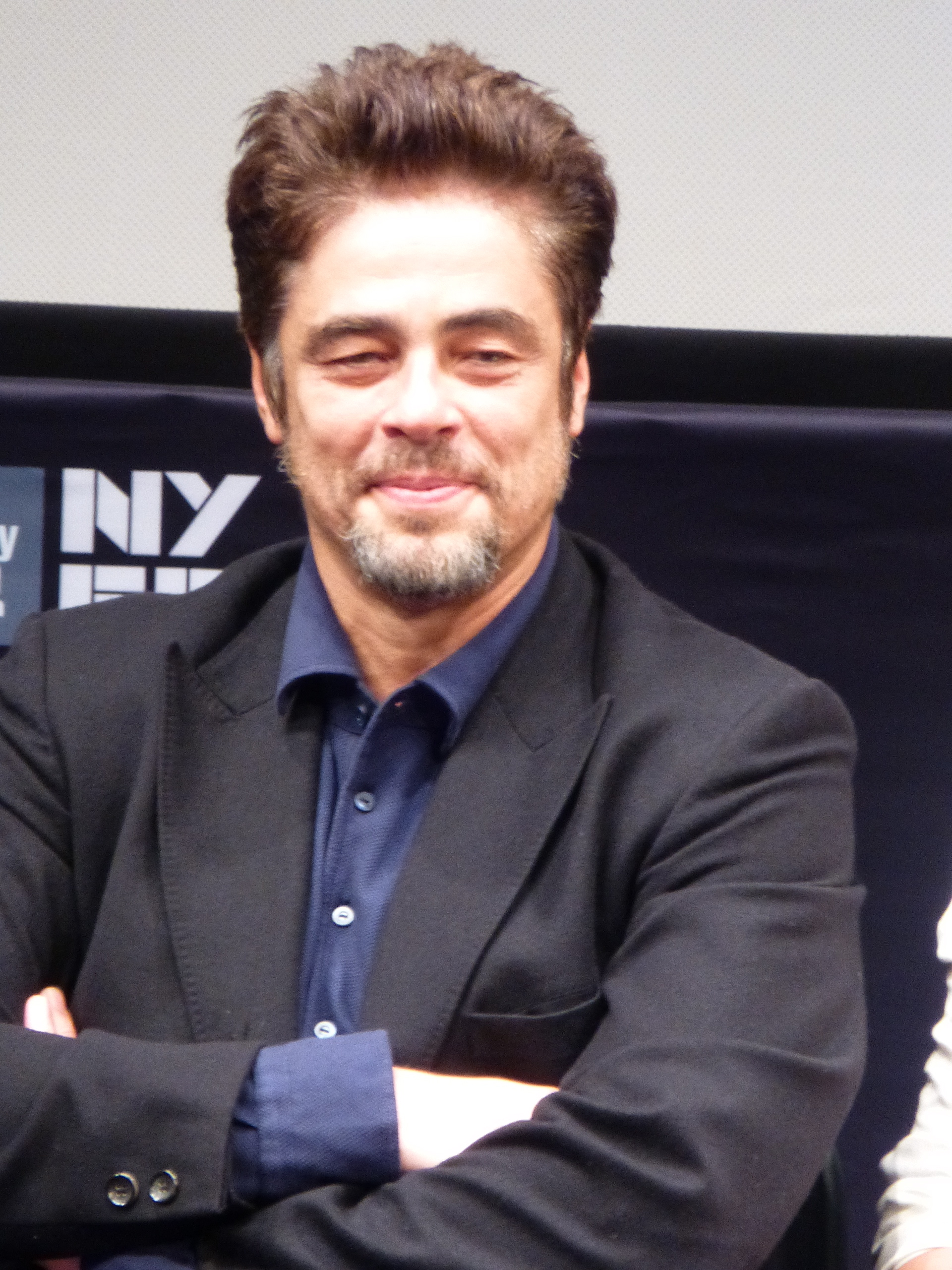
- Del Toro at the 2014 New York Film Festival
Awards and nominations
Award	Wins	Nominations
Academy Awards	1	3
AWFJ EDA Awards	0	1
AARP Movies for Grownups Awards	1	2
American Latino Media Arts Awards	1	5
Astra Film Awards	0	2
Austin Film Critics Association Awards	2	4
Australian Academy of Cinema and Television Arts Awards	0	2
Berlin International Film Festival Awards	1	1
Blockbuster Entertainment Awards	1	1
Boston Online Film Critics Association Awards	1	1
British Academy Film Awards	1	4
Cannes Film Festival Awards	1	2
Cinema Writers Circle Awards	0	2
CinemaCon Awards	1	1
Chicago Film Critics Association Awards	3	5
Chlotrudis Awards	1	1
Critics' Choice Movie Awards	0	4
Critics' Choice Television Awards	0	1
Dallas–Fort Worth Film Critics Association Awards	1	3
Detroit Film Critics Society Awards	2	3
Dorian Awards	0	1
Emmy Awards	0	1
Empire Awards	0	1
Florida Film Critics Circle Awards	2	3
Georgia Film Critics Association Awards	2	3
Golden Globe Awards	1	2
Gotham Awards	0	1
Goya Awards	1	1
Hollywood Film Awards	1	1
Houston Film Critics Society Awards	0	2
Imagen Awards	1	1
Independent Spirit Awards	4	4
IndieWire Critics Poll Awards	0	2
International Cinephile Society Awards	1	4
Jupiter Awards	0	1
Kansas City Film Critics Circle Awards	1	2
Karlovy Vary International Film Festival Awards	1	1
London Film Critics' Circle Awards	0	2
Los Angeles Film Critics Association Awards	2	2
MTV Movie & TV Awards	0	1
National Board of Review Awards	2	2
National Society of Film Critics Awards	2	2
New York Film Critics Circle Awards	3	3
New York Film Critics Online Awards	1	2
Online Film Critics Society Awards	2	4
Paris Film Critics Association Awards	0	1
Platino Awards	1	2
San Diego Film Critics Society Awards	1	2
San Francisco Bay Area Film Critics Circle Awards	1	2
San Sebastián International Film Festival Awards	1	1
Santa Barbara International Film Festival Awards	1	1
Sarajevo Film Festival Awards	1	1
Satellite Awards	1	6
Screen Actors Guild Awards	2	5
Seattle Film Critics Society Awards	0	1
Southeastern Film Critics Association Awards	2	2
St. Louis Film Critics Association Awards	1	3
Sundance Film Festival Awards	1	1
Toronto Film Critics Association Awards	3	3
Vancouver Film Critics Circle Awards	2	3
Venice Film Festival Awards	1	1
Washington D.C. Area Film Critics Association Awards	2	3

Totals (Note: Certain award groups do not simply award one winner. They acknowledge several different recipients, have runners-up, and have third place. Since this is a specific recognition and is different from losing an award, runner-up mentions are considered wins in this award tally. For simplification and to avoid errors, each award in this list has been presumed to have had a prior nomination.)
- Wins: 66
- Nominations: 134

Benicio del Toro is a Puerto Rican actor, director and film producer who has received various awards and nominations, including an Academy Award, a British Academy Film Award, a Golden Globe Award, and two Screen Actors Guild Awards.

He rose to fame with his scene-stealing breakout role as the eccentric, unintelligible crook Fred Fenster in The Usual Suspects (1995), which won him his first Independent Spirit Award for Best Supporting Male. The following year, he won a second consecutive Independent Spirit Award for Basquiat (1996). In 2000, he starred in the Steven Soderbergh-directed crime drama film Traffic as the jaded but morally upright police officer Javier Rodriguez. His performance was met with critical acclaim and earned him the Academy Award, the BAFTA Award, and the Golden Globe Award for Best Supporting Actor, as well as two Screen Actors Guild Awards for Outstanding Performance by a Male Actor in a Leading Role and Outstanding Performance by a Cast in a Motion Picture. In 2003, he starred in 21 Grams directed by Alejandro González Iñárritu, for which he was nominated for a BAFTA Award for Best Actor in a Leading Role and a second Academy Award for Best Supporting Actor. He collaborated with Soderbergh again in 2008 on Che, a biographical film about Ernesto "Che" Guevara which he also produced, for which he won the Cannes Film Festival Award for Best Actor and the Goya Award for Best Actor. He received a third BAFTA Award nomination for the action-thriller film Sicario (2015), while he earned his third Academy Award nomination for Best Supporting Actor for Paul Thomas Anderson's black comedy One Battle After Another (2025).

In 2018, he took part in the Showtime miniseries Escape at Dannemora as real-life murderer Richard Matt, for which he was nominated for the Primetime Emmy Award for Outstanding Lead Actor in a Limited Series or Movie.

== Awards and nominations ==
Awards and nominations received by Benicio del Toro
Award	Year	Work	Category	Result	Ref.
Academy Awards	2001	Traffic	Best Supporting Actor	Won	
Academy Awards	2004	21 Grams	Best Supporting Actor	Nominated	
Academy Awards	2026	One Battle After Another	Best Supporting Actor	Nominated	
Alliance of Women Film Journalists EDA Awards	2025	One Battle After Another	Best Supporting Actor	Nominated	
AARP Movies for Grownups Awards	2026	One Battle After Another	Best Supporting Actor	Nominated	
AARP Movies for Grownups Awards	2026	One Battle After Another	Best Ensemble (Note: shared with the cast of the respective film)	Won	
American Latino Media Arts Awards	1998	Excess Baggage	Outstanding Individual Performance in a Crossover Role in a Feature Film	Nominated	
American Latino Media Arts Awards	2001	Traffic	Outstanding Latino Cast	Won	
American Latino Media Arts Awards	2002	The Pledge	Outstanding Supporting Actor in a Motion Picture	Nominated	
American Latino Media Arts Awards	2006	Sin City	Outstanding Actor in a Motion Picture	Nominated	
American Latino Media Arts Awards	2012	Savages	Outstanding Actor in a Motion Picture	Nominated	
Astra Film Awards	2026	One Battle After Another	Best Supporting Actor – Comedy or Musical	Nominated	
Astra Film Awards	2026	One Battle After Another	Best Cast Ensemble	Nominated	
Austin Film Critics Association Awards	2015	Sicario	Best Supporting Actor	Nominated	
Austin Film Critics Association Awards	2022	The French Dispatch	Best Ensemble	Won	
Austin Film Critics Association Awards	2025	One Battle After Another	Best Supporting Actor	Won	
Austin Film Critics Association Awards	2025	One Battle After Another	Best Ensemble	Nominated	
Australian Academy of Cinema and Television Arts Awards	2016	Sicario	Best International Supporting Actor	Nominated	
Australian Academy of Cinema and Television Arts Awards	2026	One Battle After Another	Best International Supporting Actor	Nominated	
Berlin International Film Festival Awards	2001	Traffic	Silver Bear for Best Actor	Won	
Blockbuster Entertainment Awards	2001	Traffic	Favorite Supporting Actor – Drama	Won	
Boston Online Film Critics Association Awards	2025	One Battle After Another	Best Supporting Actor	Won	
British Academy Film Awards	2001	Traffic	Best Actor in a Supporting Role	Won	
British Academy Film Awards	2004	21 Grams	Best Actor in a Leading Role	Nominated	
British Academy Film Awards	2016	Sicario	Best Actor in a Supporting Role	Nominated	
British Academy Film Awards	2026	One Battle After Another	Best Actor in a Supporting Role	Nominated	
Cannes Film Festival Awards	2008	Che	Best Actor	Won	
Cannes Film Festival Awards	2012	7 Days in Havana	Un Certain Regard (Note: shared with Laurent Cantet, Julio Médem, Gaspar Noé, Elia Suleiman, Juan Carlos Tabío, and Pablo Trapero)	Nominated	
Cinema Writers Circle Awards	2009	Che	Best Actor	Nominated	
Cinema Writers Circle Awards	2016	A Perfect Day	Best Actor	Nominated	
CinemaCon Awards	2018	Benicio del Toro	Male Star of the Year	Won	
Chicago Film Critics Association Awards	1996	The Usual Suspects	Most Promising Actor	Nominated	
Chicago Film Critics Association Awards	2001	Traffic	Best Supporting Actor	Won	
Chicago Film Critics Association Awards	2004	21 Grams	Best Supporting Actor	Nominated	
Chicago Film Critics Association Awards	2015	Sicario	Best Supporting Actor	Won	
Chicago Film Critics Association Awards	2025	One Battle After Another	Best Supporting Actor	Won	
Chlotrudis Awards	2001	Traffic	Best Supporting Actor	Won	
Critics' Choice Movie Awards	2001	Traffic	Best Supporting Actor	Nominated	
Critics' Choice Movie Awards	2004	21 Grams	Best Supporting Actor	Nominated	
Critics' Choice Movie Awards	2006	Sin City	Best Acting Ensemble	Nominated	
Critics' Choice Movie Awards	2026	One Battle After Another	Best Supporting Actor	Nominated	
Critics' Choice Television Awards	2019	Escape at Dannemora	Best Actor in a Movie/Miniseries	Nominated	
Dallas–Fort Worth Film Critics Association Awards	2001	Traffic	Best Supporting Actor	Nominated	
Dallas–Fort Worth Film Critics Association Awards	2015	Sicario	Best Supporting Actor	5th Place	
Dallas–Fort Worth Film Critics Association Awards	2025	One Battle After Another	Best Supporting Actor	Runner-up	
Detroit Film Critics Society Awards	2014	Guardians of the Galaxy	Best Ensemble (Note: tied with the casts of Birdman and The Grand Budapest Hotel)	Won	
Detroit Film Critics Society Awards	2015	Sicario	Best Supporting Actor	Nominated	
Detroit Film Critics Society Awards	2021	The French Dispatch	Best Ensemble	Won	
Dorian Awards	2026	One Battle After Another	Supporting Film Performance of the Year	Nominated	
Empire Awards	2002	Traffic	Best Actor	Nominated	
Florida Film Critics Circle Awards	2001	Traffic	Best Supporting Actor	Won	
Florida Film Critics Circle Awards	2025	One Battle After Another	Best Supporting Actor	Nominated	
Florida Film Critics Circle Awards	2025	One Battle After Another	Best Cast	Runner-up	
Georgia Film Critics Association Awards	2015	Sicario	Best Supporting Actor	Nominated	
Georgia Film Critics Association Awards	2025	One Battle After Another	Best Supporting Actor	Won	
Georgia Film Critics Association Awards	2025	One Battle After Another	Best Ensemble	Won	
Golden Globe Awards	2001	Traffic	Best Supporting Actor – Motion Picture	Won	
Golden Globe Awards	2026	One Battle After Another	Best Supporting Actor – Motion Picture	Nominated	
Goya Awards	2009	Che	Best Actor	Won	
Gotham Awards	2025	One Battle After Another	Outstanding Supporting Performance	Nominated	
Hollywood Film Awards	2015	Sicario	Best Supporting Actor	Won	
Houston Film Critics Society Awards	2026	One Battle After Another	Best Supporting Actor	Nominated	
Houston Film Critics Society Awards	2026	One Battle After Another	Best Ensemble	Nominated	
Imagen Awards	2001	Benicio del Toro	Lasting Image Award	Won	
Independent Spirit Awards	1996	The Usual Suspects	Best Supporting Male	Won	
Independent Spirit Awards	1997	Basquiat	Best Supporting Male	Won	
Independent Spirit Awards	2004	21 Grams	Special Distinction Award (Note: shared with the cast, director and writer of the film)	Won	
Independent Spirit Awards	2015	Inherent Vice	Robert Altman Award (Note: shared with the cast, director and casting director of the film)	Won	
IndieWire Critics Poll Awards	2015	Sicario	Best Supporting Actor	4th Place	
IndieWire Critics Poll Awards	2025	One Battle After Another	Best Performance (Note: tied with Sean Penn)	7th Place	
International Cinephile Society Awards	2004	21 Grams	Best Supporting Actor	Won	
International Cinephile Society Awards	2016	Sicario	Best Supporting Actor	Nominated	
International Cinephile Society Awards	2026	One Battle After Another	Best Supporting Actor	Nominated	
International Cinephile Society Awards	2026	One Battle After Another	Best Ensemble	Nominated	
Jupiter Awards	2016	Sicario	Best International Actor	Nominated	
Kansas City Film Critics Circle Awards	2000	Traffic	Best Supporting Actor	Won	
Kansas City Film Critics Circle Awards	2025	One Battle After Another	Best Supporting Actor	Nominated	
Karlovy Vary International Film Festival Awards	2022	Benicio del Toro	President's Award	Won	
London Film Critics' Circle Awards	2016	Sicario	Supporting Actor of the Year	Nominated	
London Film Critics' Circle Awards	2026	One Battle After Another	Supporting Actor of the Year	Nominated	
Los Angeles Film Critics Association Awards	2000	Traffic	Best Supporting Actor	Runner-up	
Los Angeles Film Critics Association Awards	2004	21 Grams	Best Supporting Actor	Runner-up	
MTV Movie & TV Awards	2013	Savages	Best Latino Actor	Nominated	
National Board of Review Awards	1995	The Usual Suspects	Best Cast	Won	
National Board of Review Awards	2025	One Battle After Another	Best Supporting Actor	Won	
National Society of Film Critics Awards	2001	Traffic	Best Supporting Actor	Won	
National Society of Film Critics Awards	2026	One Battle After Another	Best Supporting Actor	Won	
New York Film Critics Circle Awards	2001	Traffic	Best Actor	Runner-up	
New York Film Critics Circle Awards	2001	Traffic	Best Supporting Actor	Won	
New York Film Critics Circle Awards	2026	One Battle After Another	Best Supporting Actor	Won	
New York Film Critics Online Awards	2025	One Battle After Another	Best Supporting Actor	Nominated	
New York Film Critics Online Awards	2025	One Battle After Another	Best Ensemble Cast	Runner-up	
Online Film Critics Society Awards	2001	Traffic	Best Supporting Actor (Note: tied with Philip Seymour Hoffman)	Won	
Online Film Critics Society Awards	2009	Che	Best Actor	Nominated	
Online Film Critics Society Awards	2015	Sicario	Best Supporting Actor	Nominated	
Online Film Critics Society Awards	2026	One Battle After Another	Best Supporting Actor	Won	
Paris Film Critics Association Awards	2026	One Battle After Another	Best Supporting Actor	Nominated	
Platino Awards	2015	Escobar: Paradise Lost	Best Actor	Nominated	
Platino Awards	2023	Benicio del Toro	Platino Honorary Award	Won	
Primetime Emmy Awards	2019	Escape at Dannemora	Outstanding Lead Actor in a Limited Series or Movie	Nominated	
San Diego Film Critics Society Awards	2000	Traffic	Best Supporting Actor	Won	
San Diego Film Critics Society Awards	2025	One Battle After Another	Best Supporting Actor	Nominated	
San Francisco Bay Area Film Critics Circle Awards	2015	Sicario	Best Supporting Actor	Nominated	
San Francisco Bay Area Film Critics Circle Awards	2025	One Battle After Another	Best Supporting Actor	Won	
San Sebastián International Film Festival Awards	2014	Benicio del Toro	Donostia Award	Won	
Santa Barbara International Film Festival Awards	2026	Benicio del Toro	Hammond Cinema Vanguard Award	Won	
Sarajevo Film Festival Awards	2015	Benicio del Toro	Heart of Sarajevo	Won	
Satellite Awards	2001	Traffic	Best Supporting Actor – Motion Picture	Nominated	
Satellite Awards	2001	Traffic	Best Motion Picture Ensemble	Won	
Satellite Awards	2004	21 Grams	Best Supporting Actor – Motion Picture	Nominated	
Satellite Awards	2016	Sicario	Best Supporting Actor – Motion Picture	Nominated	
Satellite Awards	2026	One Battle After Another	Best Supporting Actor – Motion Picture	Nominated	
Screen Actors Guild Awards	2001	Traffic	Outstanding Performance by a Cast in a Motion Picture	Won	
Screen Actors Guild Awards	2001	Traffic	Outstanding Performance by a Male Actor in a Leading Role	Won	
Screen Actors Guild Awards	2004	21 Grams	Outstanding Performance by a Male Actor in a Supporting Role	Nominated	
Screen Actors Guild Awards	2026	One Battle After Another	Outstanding Performance by a Cast in a Motion Picture	Nominated	
Screen Actors Guild Awards	2026	One Battle After Another	Outstanding Performance by a Male Actor in a Supporting Role	Nominated	
Seattle Film Critics Society Awards	2025	One Battle After Another	Best Supporting Actor	Nominated	
Southeastern Film Critics Association Awards	2000	Traffic	Best Supporting Actor	Won	
Southeastern Film Critics Association Awards	2025	One Battle After Another	Best Supporting Actor	Won	
St. Louis Film Critics Association Awards	2021	The French Dispatch	Best Ensemble	Nominated	
St. Louis Film Critics Association Awards	2025	One Battle After Another	Best Supporting Actor	Nominated	
St. Louis Film Critics Association Awards	2025	One Battle After Another	Best Ensemble	Won	
Sundance Film Festival Awards	2002	Benicio del Toro	Piper-Heidsieck Tribute to Independent Vision Award	Won	
Toronto Film Critics Association Awards	2000	Traffic	Best Actor	Won	
Toronto Film Critics Association Awards	2015	Sicario	Best Supporting Actor	Runner-up	
Toronto Film Critics Association Awards	2025	One Battle After Another	Outstanding Supporting Performance	Won	
Vancouver Film Critics Circle Awards	2001	Traffic	Best Actor	Won	
Vancouver Film Critics Circle Awards	2004	21 Grams	Best Supporting Actor	Runner-up	
Vancouver Film Critics Circle Awards	2026	One Battle After Another	Best Supporting Actor	Nominated	
Venice Film Festival Awards	2003	21 Grams	Leone del Pubblico Prize for Best Actor (Note: tied with Omar Sharif)	Won	
Washington D.C. Area Film Critics Association Awards	2003	21 Grams	Best Supporting Actor	Won	
Washington D.C. Area Film Critics Association Awards	2021	The French Dispatch	Best Acting Ensemble	Nominated	
Washington D.C. Area Film Critics Association Awards	2025	One Battle After Another	Best Supporting Actor	Won	
