= Critics' Choice Television Award for Best Actor in a Movie/Miniseries =

Annual award by the Broadcast Television Critics Association

Critics' Choice Television Award for Best Actor in a Limited Series or Movie Made for Television
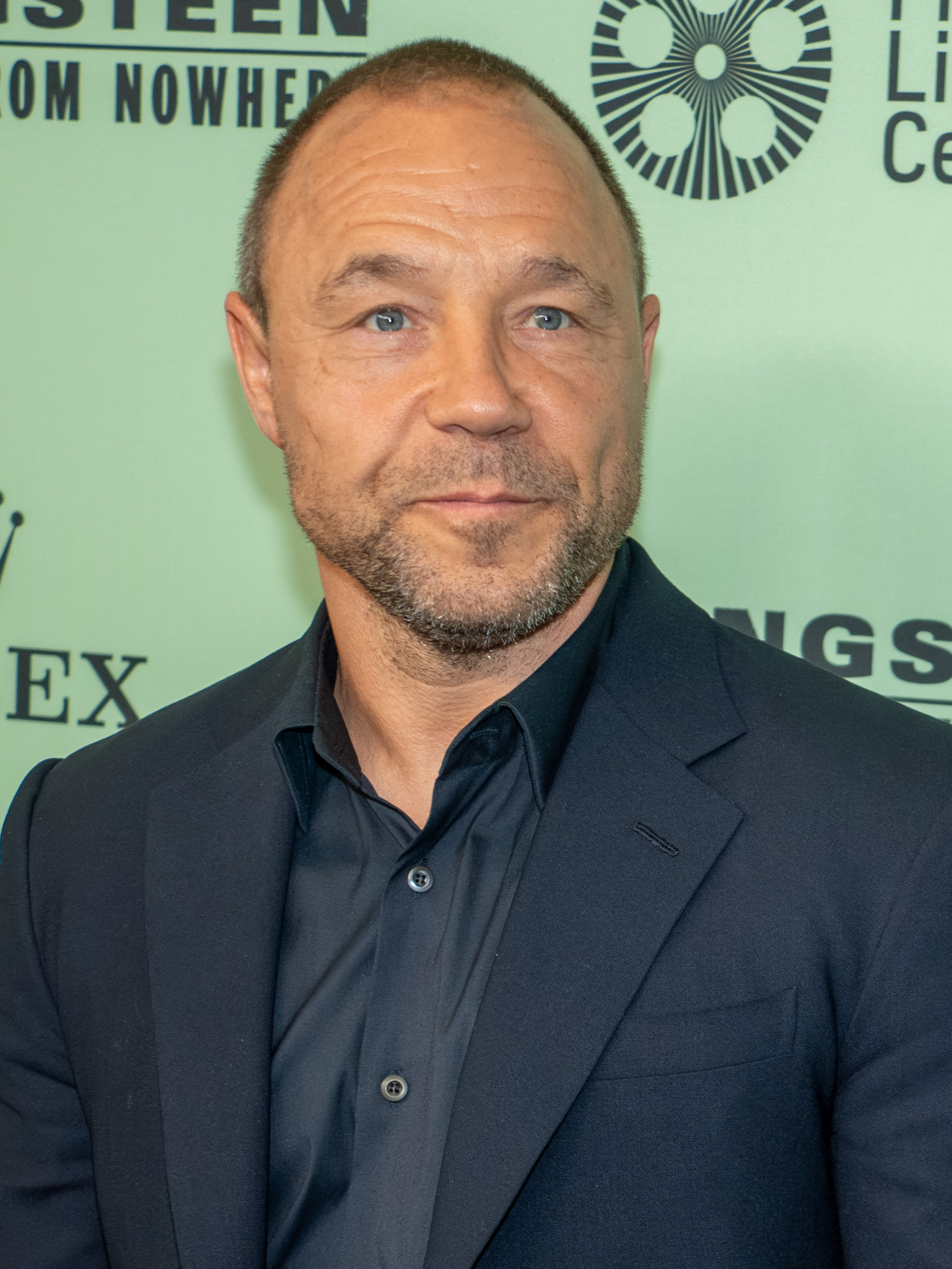
- The 2026 recipient: Stephen Graham
- Country: United States
- Presented by: Critics Choice Association
- First award: 2012
- Currently held by: Stephen Graham – Adolescence (2025)
- Website: criticschoice.com

The Critics' Choice Television Award for Best Actor in a Limited Series or Movie Made for Television is one of the award categories presented annually by the Critics' Choice Television Awards to recognize the work done by television actors.

The award was introduced in 2012. The winners are selected by a group of television critics that are part of the Broadcast Television Critics Association.

Benedict Cumberbatch holds the record for most nominations in this category with four (thrice for Sherlock and once for Parade's End).

Stephen Graham is the current winner in the category for Adolescence (2025).

== Winners and nominees ==
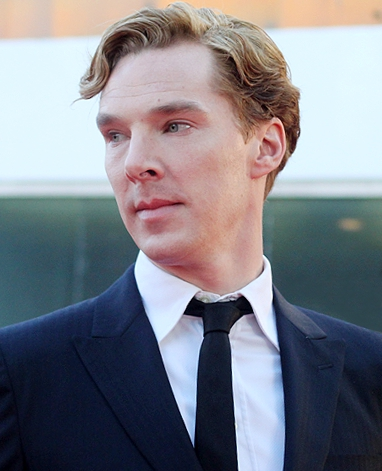
Benedict Cumberbatch won for Sherlock (2012)

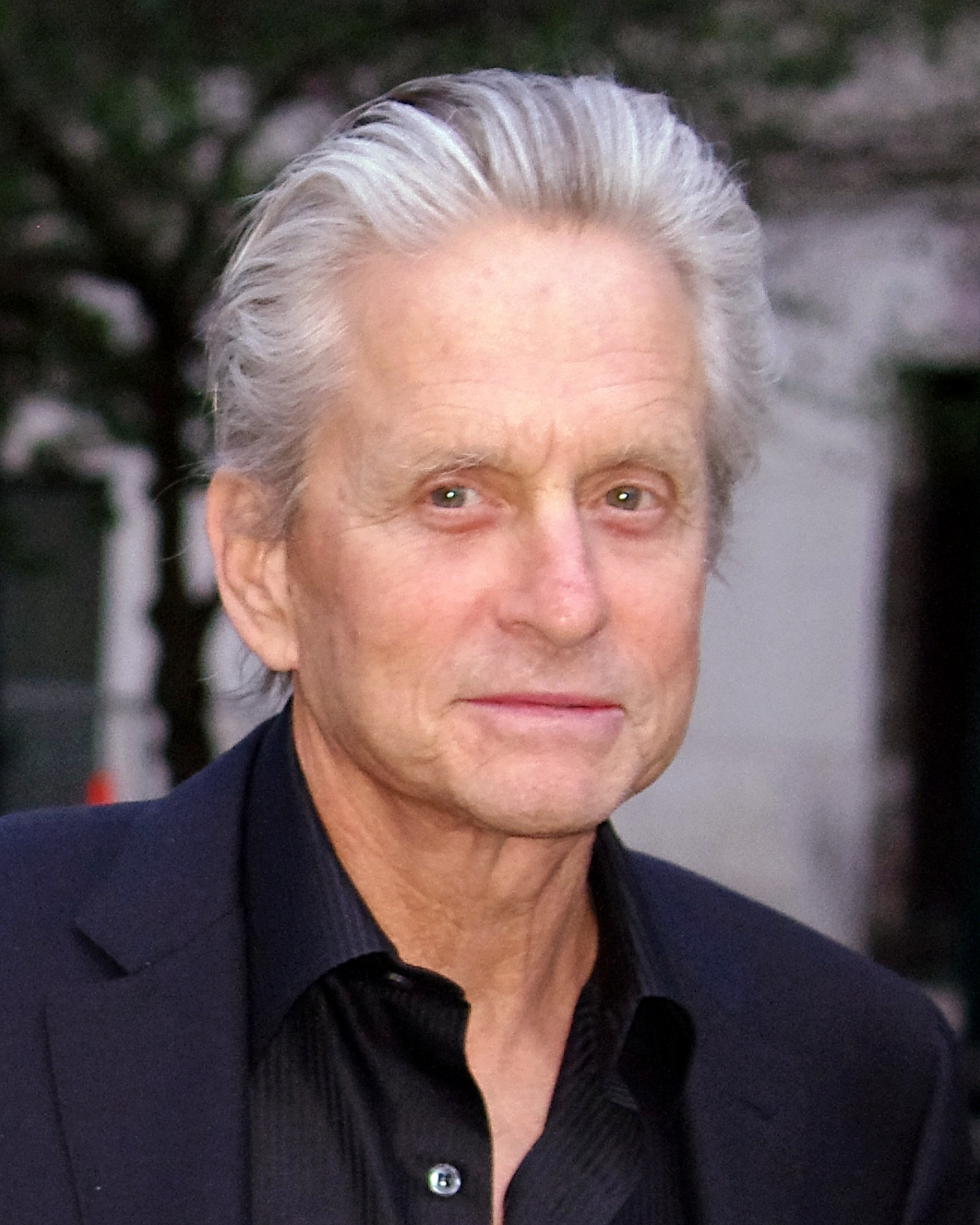
Michael Douglas won for Behind the Candelabra (2013)

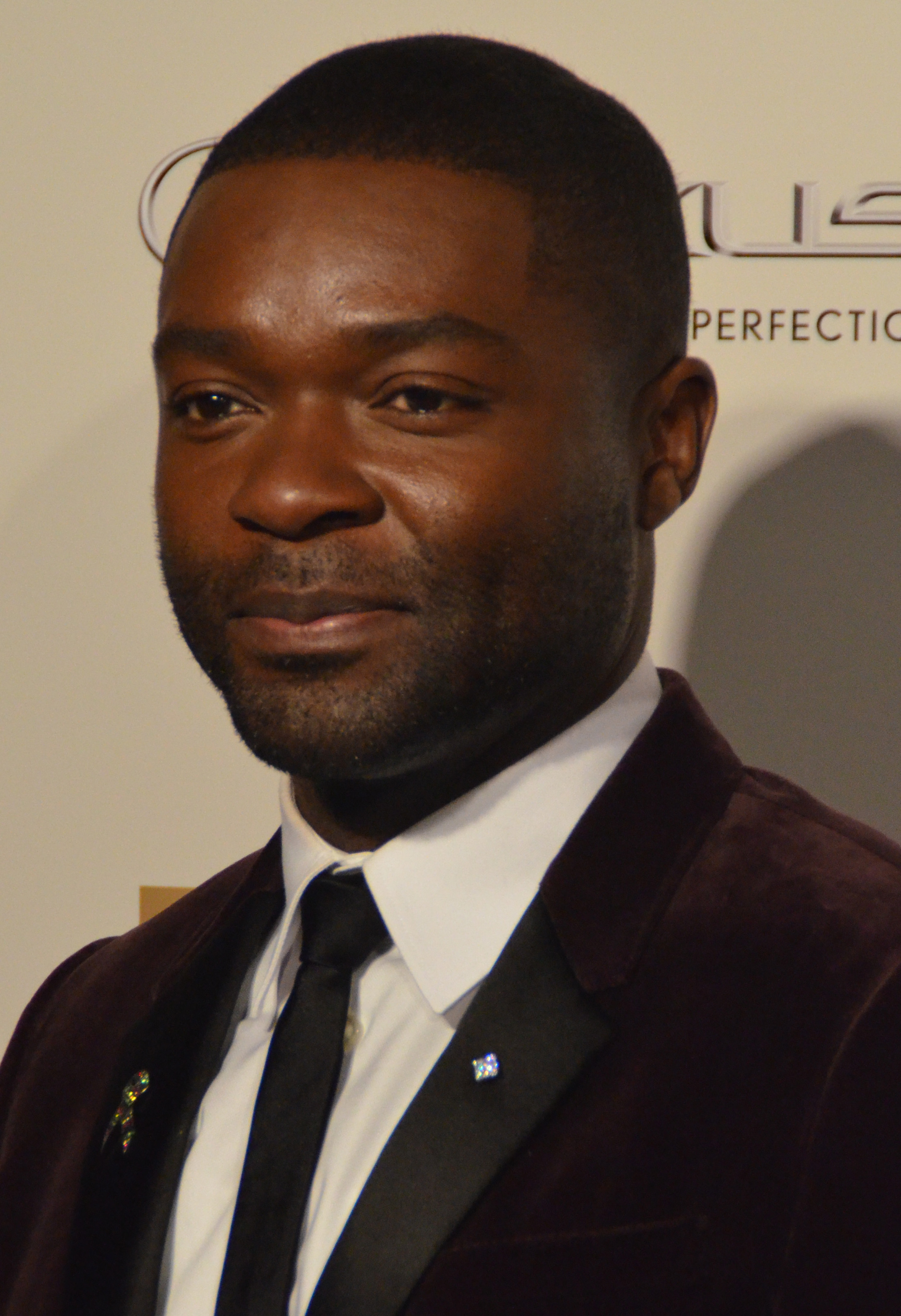
David Oyelowo won for Nightingale (2015)

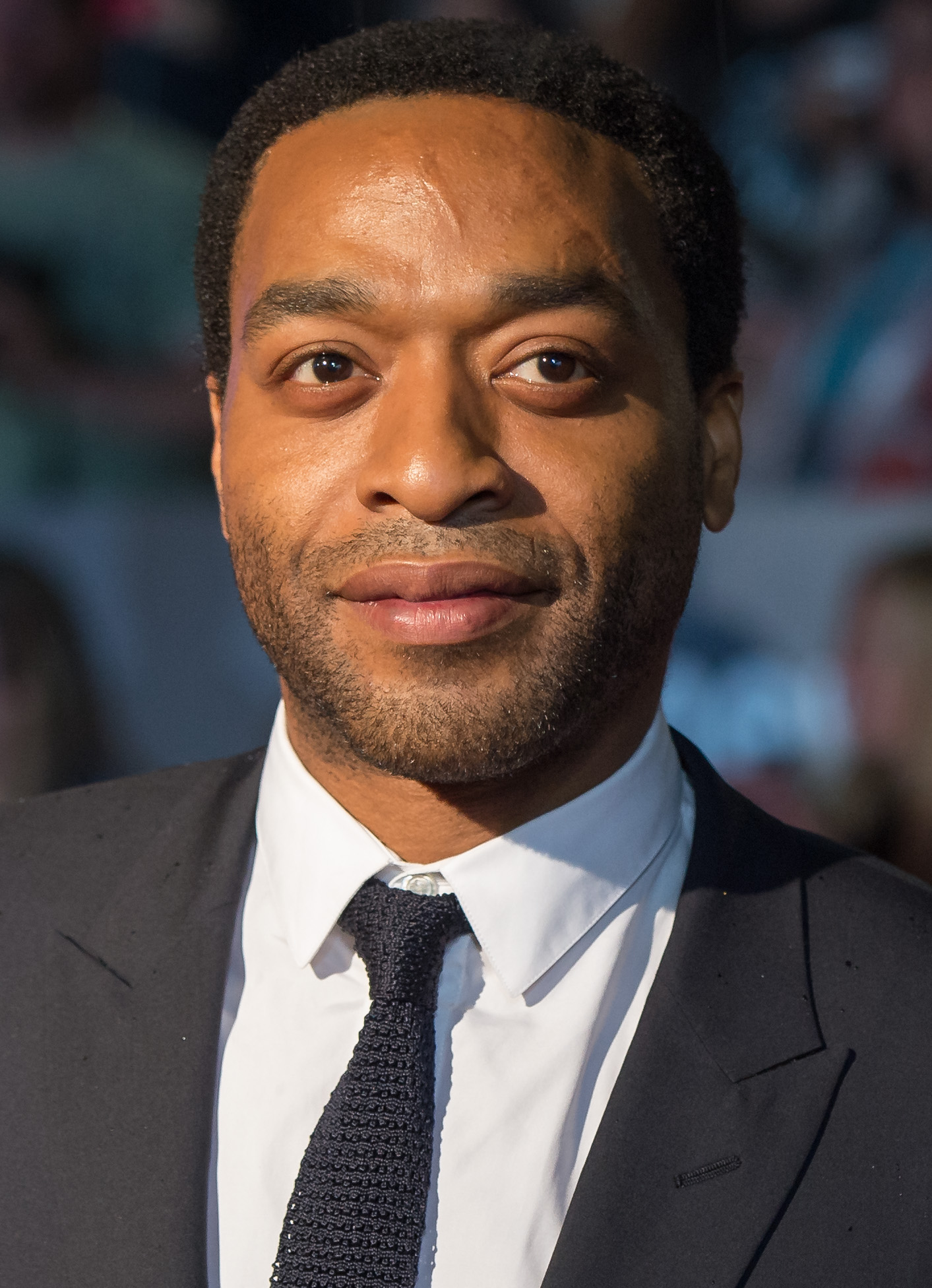
Chiwetel Ejiofor won for Luther (2016)

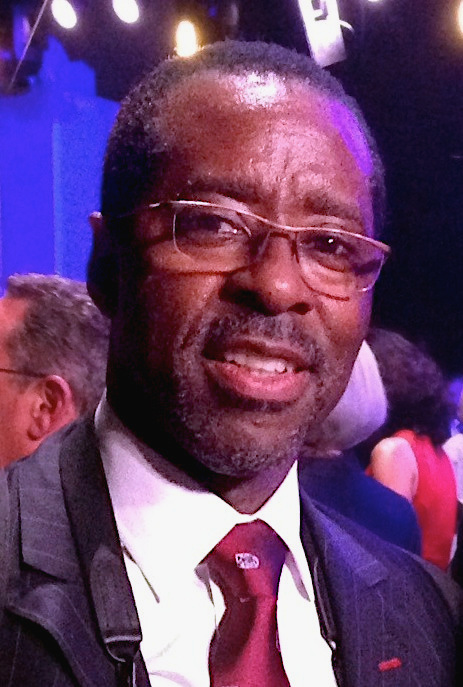
Courtney B. Vance won for The People v. O.J. Simpson (2016)

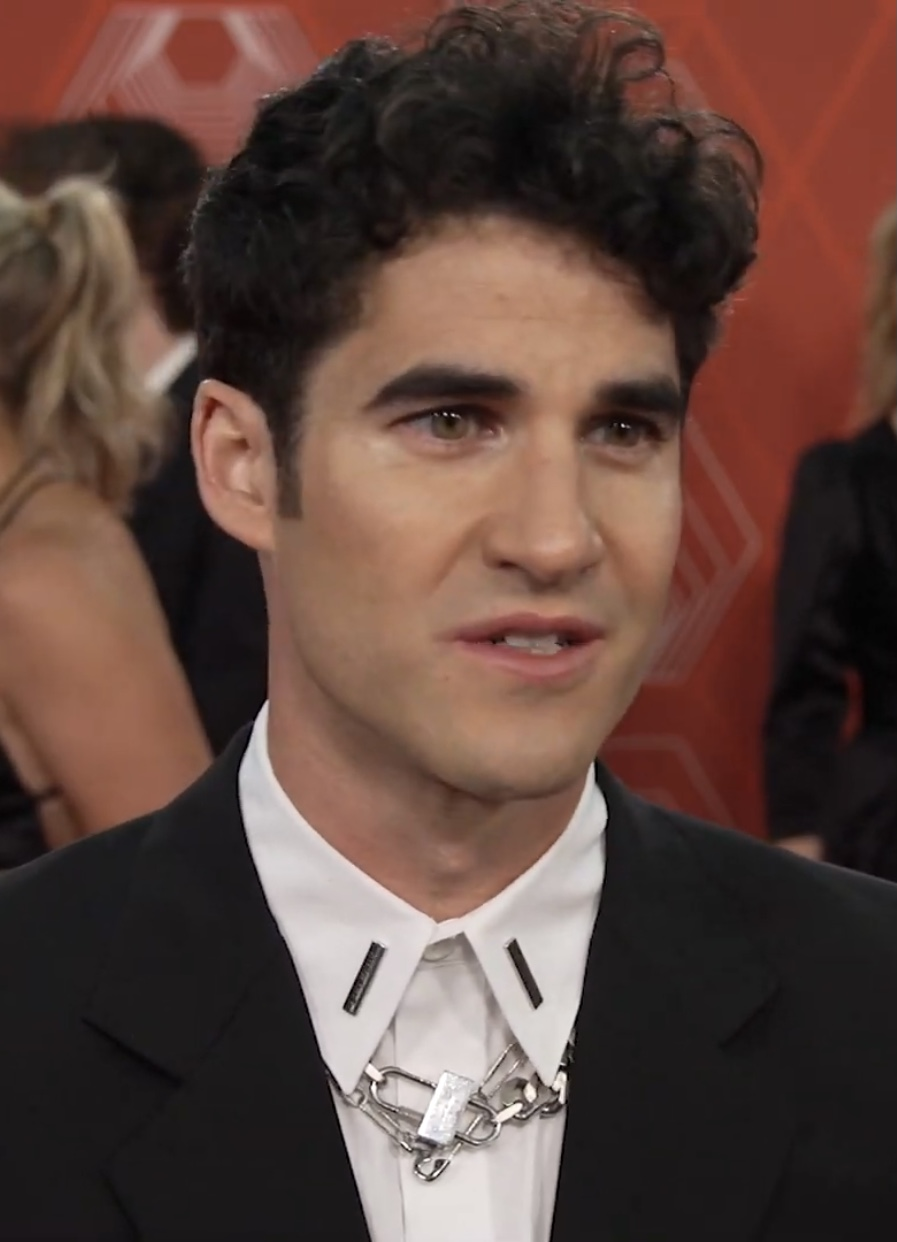
Darren Criss won for The Assassination of Gianni Versace: American Crime Story (2019)

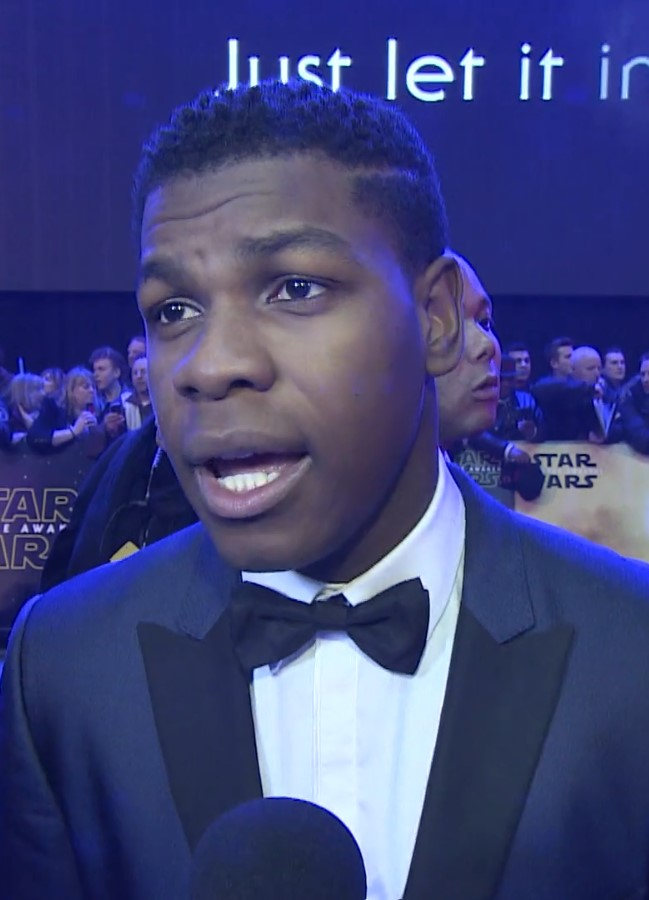
John Boyega won for Small Axe (2021)

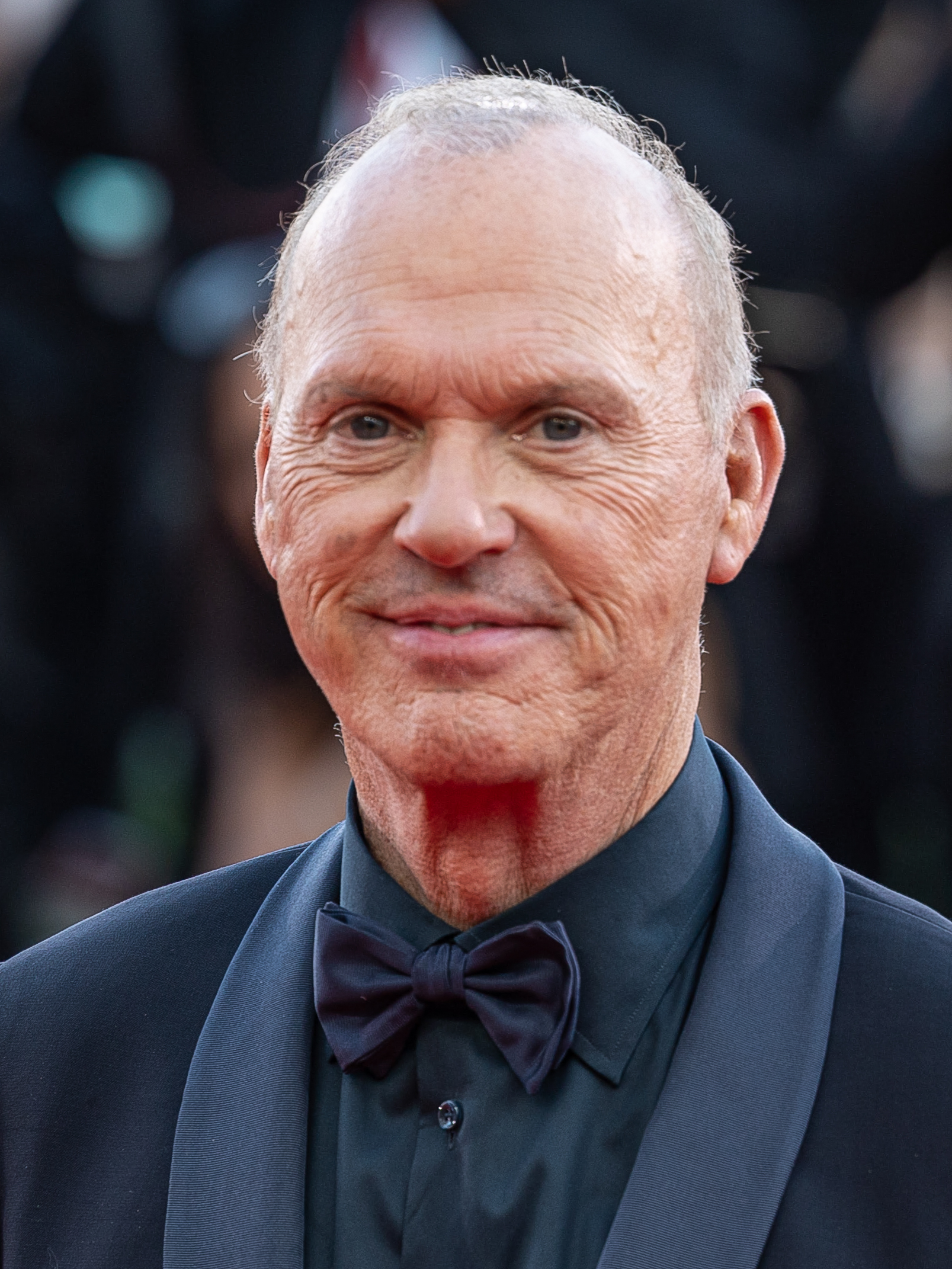
Michael Keaton won for Dopesick (2022)

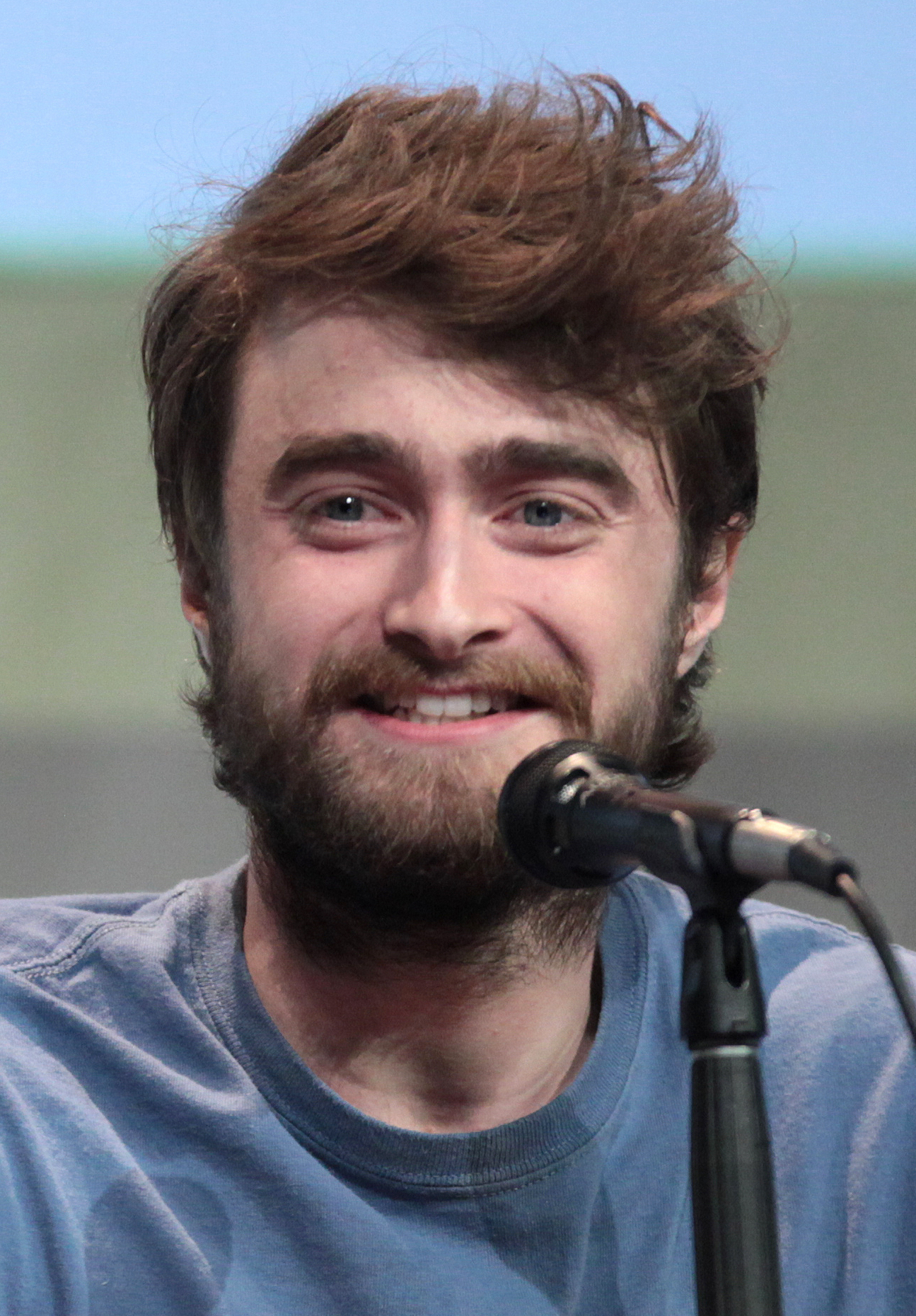
Daniel Radcliffe won for Weird: The Al Yankovic Story (2023)

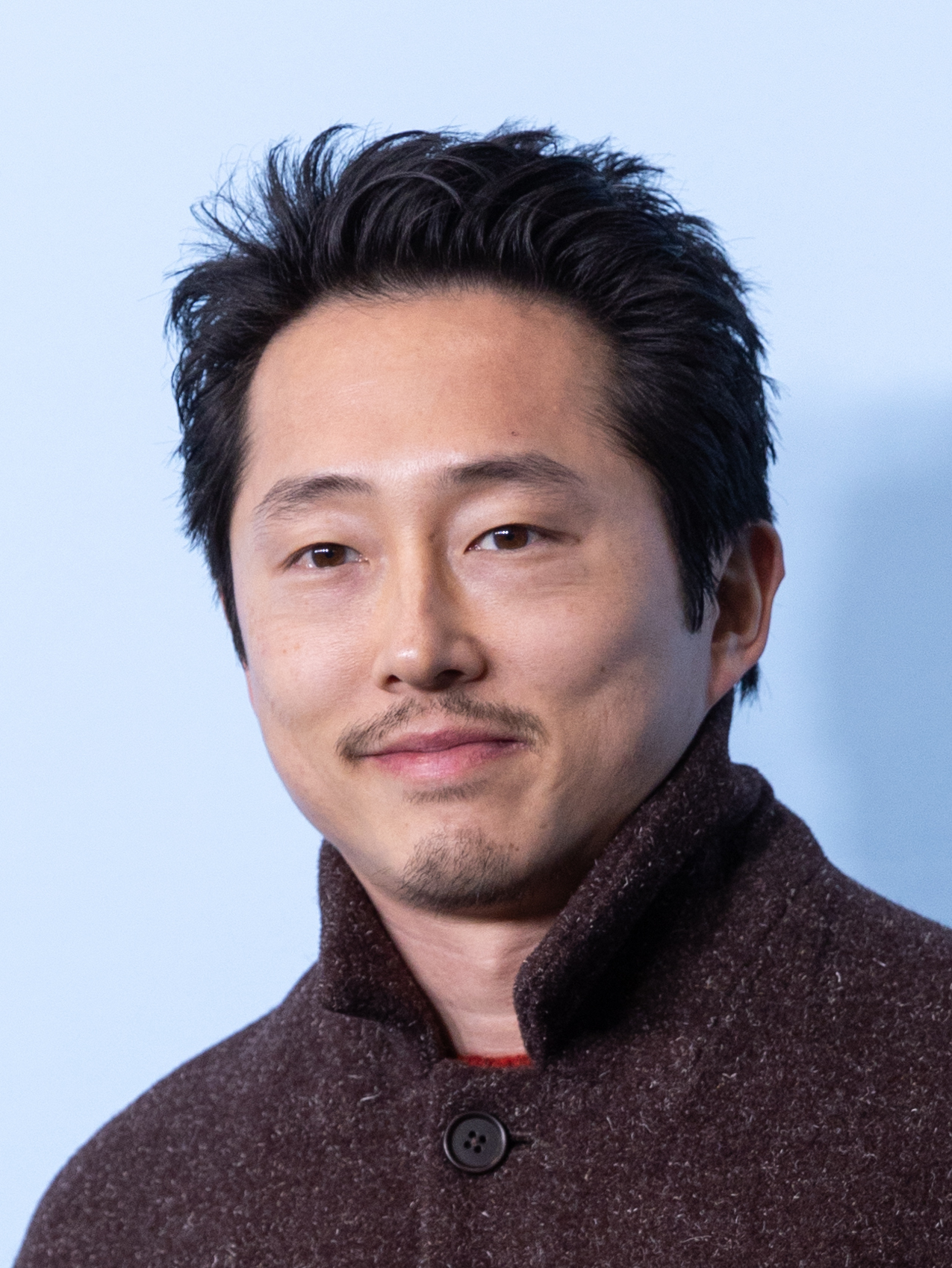
Steven Yeun won for Beef (2024)

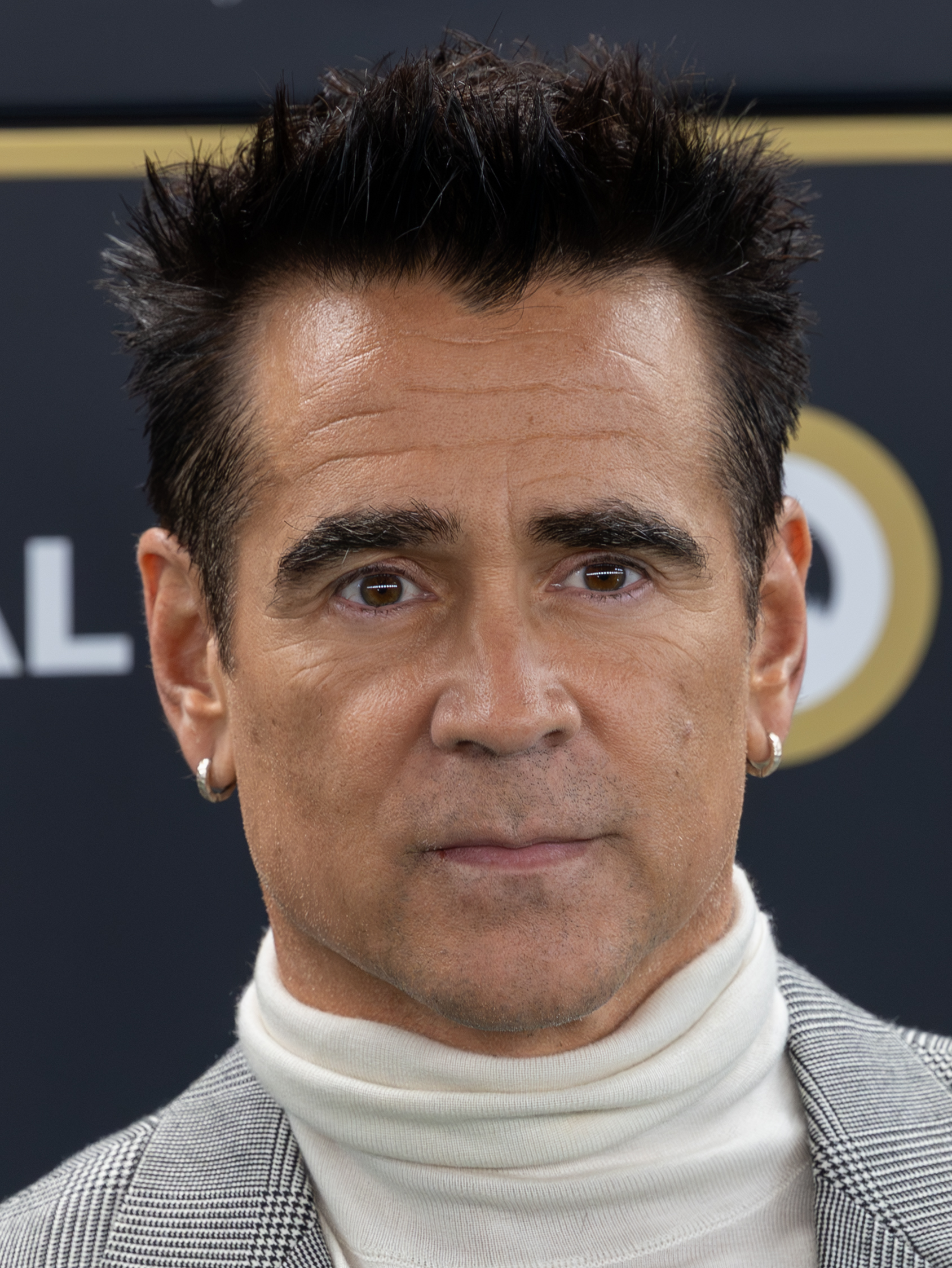
Colin Farrell won for The Penguin (2025)

=== 2010s ===
Year	Actor	Role	Program	Network
2012	Benedict Cumberbatch	Sherlock	Sherlock Holmes	PBS
2012	Kevin Costner	Hatfields & McCoys	Devil Anse Hatfield	History
2012	Idris Elba	Luther	John Luther	BBC America
2012	Dominic West	The Hour	Hector Madden	BBC America
2012	Woody Harrelson	Game Change	Steve Schmidt	HBO
2012	Bill Nighy	Page Eight	Johnny Worricker	PBS
2013	Michael Douglas	Behind the Candelabra	Liberace	HBO
2013	Dominic West	The Hour	Hector Madden	BBC America
2013	Benedict Cumberbatch	Parade's End	Christopher Tietjens	HBO
2013	Matt Damon	Behind the Candelabra	Scott Thorson	HBO
2013	Toby Jones	The Girl	Alfred Hitchcock	HBO
2013	Al Pacino	Phil Spector	Phil Spector	HBO
2014	Billy Bob Thornton	Fargo	Lorne Malvo	FX
2014	David Bradley	An Adventure in Space and Time	William Hartnell	BBC America
2014	Benedict Cumberbatch	Sherlock: His Last Vow	Sherlock Holmes	PBS
2014	Chiwetel Ejiofor	Dancing on the Edge	Louis Lester	Starz
2014	Martin Freeman	Fargo	Lester Nygaard	FX
2014	Mark Ruffalo	The Normal Heart	Ned Weeks	HBO
2015	David Oyelowo	Nightingale	Peter Snowden	HBO
2015	James Nesbitt	The Missing	Tony Hughes	Starz
2015	Michael Gambon	The Casual Vacancy	Howard Mollison	HBO
2015	Richard Jenkins	Olive Kitteridge	Henry Kitteridge	HBO
2015	Mark Rylance	Wolf Hall	Thomas Cromwell	PBS
2015	Kiefer Sutherland	24: Live Another Day	Jack Bauer	Fox
2016 (1)	Idris Elba	Luther	John Luther	BBC America
2016 (1)	Wes Bentley	American Horror Story: Hotel	John Lowe	FX
2016 (1)	Patrick Wilson	Fargo	State Trooper Lou Solverson	FX
2016 (1)	Martin Clunes	Arthur & George	Arthur Conan Doyle	PBS
2016 (1)	Oscar Isaac	Show Me a Hero	Nick Wasicsko	HBO
2016 (1)	Vincent Kartheiser	Saints & Strangers	William Bradford	Nat Geo
2016 (2)	Courtney B. Vance	The People v. O. J. Simpson: American Crime Story	Johnnie Cochran	FX
2016 (2)	Bryan Cranston	All the Way	Lyndon B. Johnson	HBO
2016 (2)	Benedict Cumberbatch	Sherlock: The Abominable Bride	Sherlock Holmes	PBS
2016 (2)	Cuba Gooding Jr.	The People v. O. J. Simpson: American Crime Story	O. J. Simpson	FX
2016 (2)	Tom Hiddleston	The Night Manager	Jonathan Pine	AMC
2016 (2)	Tim Matheson	Killing Reagan	Ronald Reagan	Nat Geo
2018	Ewan McGregor	Fargo	Emmit and Ray Stussy	FX
2018	Jeff Daniels	Godless	Frank Griffin	Netflix
2018	Jack O’Connell	Godless	Roy Goode	Netflix
2018	Jimmy Tatro	American Vandal	Dylan Maxwell	Netflix
2018	Robert De Niro	The Wizard of Lies	Bernard Madoff	HBO
2018	Evan Peters	American Horror Story: Cult	Kai Anderson	FX
2018	Bill Pullman	The Sinner	Detective Harry Ambrose	USA
2019	Darren Criss	The Assassination of Gianni Versace: American Crime Story	Andrew Cunanan	FX
2019	Antonio Banderas	Genius: Picasso	Pablo Picasso	Nat Geo
2019	Paul Dano	Escape at Dannemora	David Sweat	Showtime
2019	Benicio del Toro	Escape at Dannemora	Richard Matt	Showtime
2019	Hugh Grant	A Very English Scandal	Jeremy Thorpe	Prime Video
2019	John Legend	Jesus Christ Superstar Live in Concert	Jesus Christ	NBC

=== 2020s ===
Year	Actor	Role	Program	Network
2020	Jharrel Jerome	When They See Us	Korey Wise	Netflix
2020	Christopher Abbott	Catch-22	Capt. John Yossarian	Hulu
2020	Mahershala Ali	True Detective	Wayne Hays	HBO
2020	Jared Harris	Chernobyl	Valery Legasov	HBO
2020	Russell Crowe	The Loudest Voice	Roger Ailes	Showtime
2020	Sam Rockwell	Fosse/Verdon	Bob Fosse	FX
2020	Noah Wyle	The Red Line	Daniel Calder	CBS
2021	John Boyega	Small Axe	Leroy Logan	Prime Video
2021	Hugh Grant	The Undoing	Jonathan Fraser	HBO
2021	Mark Ruffalo	I Know This Much Is True	Dominick and Thomas Birdsey	HBO
2021	Morgan Spector	The Plot Against America	Herman Levin	HBO
2021	Paul Mescal	Normal People	Connell Waldron	Hulu
2021	Chris Rock	Fargo	Loy Cannon	FX
2022	Michael Keaton	Dopesick	Dr. Samuel Finnix	Hulu
2022	Olly Alexander	It's a Sin	Ritchie Tozer	Channel 4
2022	Paul Bettany	WandaVision	Vision	Disney+
2022	William Jackson Harper	Love Life	Marcus Watkins	HBO Max
2022	Joshua Jackson	Dr. Death	Christopher Duntsch	Peacock
2022	Hamish Linklater	Midnight Mass	Father Paul Hill	Netflix
2023	Daniel Radcliffe	Weird: The Al Yankovic Story	"Weird Al" Yankovic	The Roku Channel
2023	Ben Foster	The Survivor	Harry Haft	HBO
2023	Andrew Garfield	Under the Banner of Heaven	Detective Jeb Pyre	FX
2023	Samuel L. Jackson	The Last Days of Ptolemy Grey	Ptolemy Grey	Apple TV+
2023	Sebastian Stan	Pam & Tommy	Tommy Lee	Hulu
2023	Ben Whishaw	This Is Going to Hurt	Adam Kay	AMC+
2024	Steven Yeun	Beef	Daniel "Danny" Cho	Netflix
2024	Matt Bomer	Fellow Travelers	Hawkins "Hawk" Fuller	Showtime
2024	Tom Holland	The Crowded Room	Danny Sullivan	Apple TV+
2024	David Oyelowo	Lawmen: Bass Reeves	Bass Reeves	Paramount+
2024	Tony Shalhoub	Mr. Monk's Last Case: A Monk Movie	Adrian Monk	Peacock
2024	Kiefer Sutherland	The Caine Mutiny Court-Martial	Lieutenant Commander Queeg	Showtime
2025	Colin Farrell	The Penguin	Oswald "Oz" Cobb / The Penguin	HBO
2025	Richard Gadd	Baby Reindeer	Donny Dunn	Netflix
2025	Tom Hollander	Feud: Capote vs. the Swans	Truman Capote	FX
2025	Kevin Kline	Disclaimer	Stephen Brigstocke	Apple TV+
2025	Ewan McGregor	A Gentleman in Moscow	Count Alexander Ilyich Rostov	Paramount+
2025	Andrew Scott	Ripley	Tom Ripley	Netflix
2026
2026	Stephen Graham	Adolescence	Eddie Miller	Netflix
2026	Michael Chernus	Devil in Disguise: John Wayne Gacy	John Wayne Gacy	Peacock
2026	Brian Tyree Henry	Dope Thief	Ray Driscoll	Apple Tv+
2026	Charlie Hunnam	Monster: The Ed Gein Story	Ed Gein	Netflix
2026	Matthew Rhys	The Beast in Me	Nile Jarvis	Netflix
2026	Michael Shannon	Death by Lightning	James A. Garfield	Netflix

== Multiple nominations and wins ==
=== Multiple nominations ===
4 nominations

- Benedict Cumberbatch

2 nominations

- Idris Elba
- Hugh Grant
- Ewan McGregor
- David Oyelowo
- Mark Ruffalo
- Kiefer Sutherland
- Dominic West

== See also ==
- Actor Award for Outstanding Performance by a Male Actor in a Miniseries or Television Movie
- Golden Globe Award for Best Actor – Miniseries or Television Film
- Primetime Emmy Award for Outstanding Lead Actor in a Limited or Anthology Series or Movie
