= Michael Tolkin =

American screenwriter, novelist, and director (born 1950)

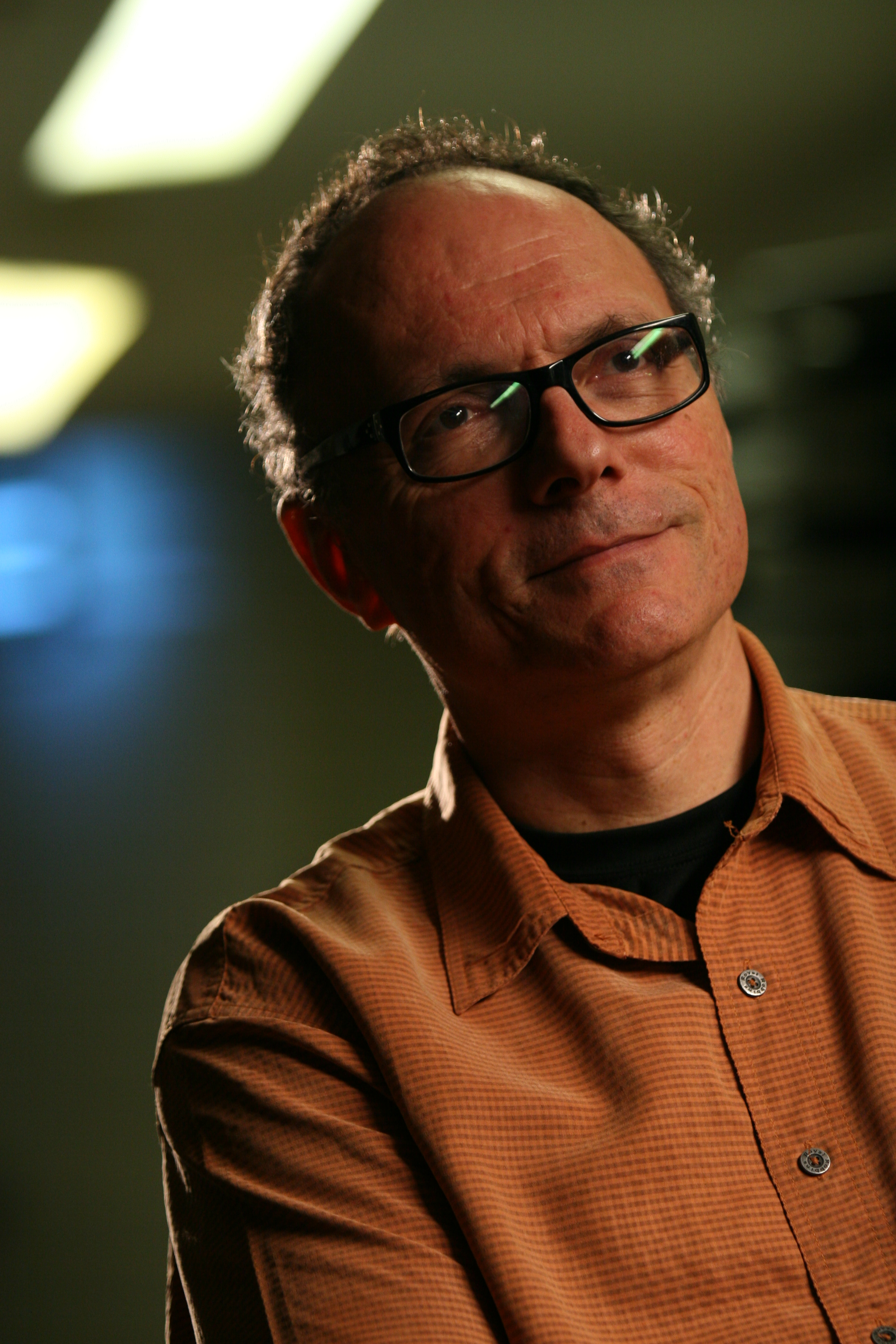
- Tolkin at Festival Internacional de Cine en Guadalajara, 2009
- Born: October 17, 1950 (age 76); New York City, New York, U.S.
- Education: Middlebury College (BA)
- Occupations: Writer, film director
- Spouse: Wendy Mogel
- Children: 2

Michael L. Tolkin (born October 17, 1950) is an American screenwriter, novelist, and director. He has written numerous screenplays, including The Player (1992), which he adapted from his own 1988 novel of the same name, and for which he received the Edgar Award for Best Motion Picture Screenplay (1993) and was nominated for the Academy Award for Best Adapted Screenplay. He later wrote a follow-up to the novel, titled The Return of the Player, which was published in 2006.

In 2018, Tolkin served as co-creator of the miniseries Escape at Dannemora with Brett Johnson. The series was based on the real-life 2015 Clinton Correctional Facility escape that led to a massive manhunt for two escaped convicts in upstate New York. In 2022, he served as creator of the miniseries The Offer, which is about the making of The Godfather.

== Biography ==
Tolkin was born to a Romanian-Jewish and Ukrainian-Jewish family in New York City, the son of Edith (née Leibovitch), a studio executive and film industry lawyer, and the late comedy writer Mel Tolkin.

He is a 1974 graduate of Middlebury College.

Tolkin lives in Los Angeles with his wife, author Wendy Mogel. They have two daughters, Susanna and Emma.

== Filmography ==
=== Film ===
Year	Title	Director	Writer	Producer	Notes
1982	Gossip	No	Yes	No	Unfinished
1989	Gleaming the Cube	No	Yes	Associate	
1991	The Rapture	Yes	Yes	No	
1992	The Player	No	Yes	Yes	BAFTA Award for Best Adapted Screenplay; Nominated — Academy Award for Best Adapted Screenplay; Nominated — BAFTA Award for Best Film; Nominated — Golden Globe Award for Best Screenplay
1992	Deep Cover	No	Yes	No	
1994	The New Age	Yes	Yes	No	
1998	Deep Impact	No	Yes	No	
2002	Changing Lanes	No	Yes	No	
2009	Nine	No	Yes	No	

Uncredited writing roles

- The Haunting (1999)
- Domestic Disturbance (2001)
- Dawn of the Dead (2004)
- The Punisher (2004)

=== Television ===
Series

Year	Title	Director	Writer	Producer	Creator	Notes
1979	Delta House	No	Yes	No	No	3 episodes
1980	Taxi	No	Yes	No	No	Episode "Shut It Down: Part 1"
2007	Masters of Science Fiction	Yes	Yes	No	No	Episode "Jerry Was a Man"
2014–15	Ray Donovan	No	Yes	Consulting	No	Wrote 4 episodes
2018	Escape at Dannemora	No	Yes	Executive	Yes	Miniseries
2022	The Offer	No	Yes	Executive	Yes	Miniseries

TV films

Year	Title	Writer	Producer
1994	The Burning Season	Yes	No
1997	The Player	Yes	Executive
2008	1%	Yes	Yes

== Bibliography ==
- The Player (1988)
- Among the Dead (1993)
- Under Radar (2003)
- The Return of the Player (2006)
- NK3 (2017)
