= Wendy Mogel =

American psychologist and author (born 1951)

- Born: United States
- Occupations: Author, clinical psychologist, public speaker
- Spouse: Michael Tolkin
- Children: 2
- Writing career
- Language: English
- Genre: Psychology
- Website: wendymogel.com

Wendy Mogel (born March 23, 1951) is an American psychologist and author, whose first book, The Blessing of a Skinned Knee, identified the problems faced by middle class children at a time of social anxiety. Her second book, The Blessing of a B Minus, focused on counseling parents whose children face destructive pressures as they prepare for college. Voice Lessons for Parents, her latest book, addresses the skills needed to converse while being surrounded by digital distractions.

== Biography ==
Mogel was raised in a secular Jewish family. She studied art history at Middlebury College in Vermont, where she graduated cum laude. She spent her summers as a counselor at a summer camp for children with emotional problems, where she met her future husband, the filmmaker and writer Michael Tolkin. After the wedding the couple moved to California.

Mogel received a master's degree from the New School in New York City and her PhD at the Wright Institute of Los Angeles. She continued her training during an internship and post-doctoral fellowship in the Department of Psychiatry at Cedars-Sinai Medical Center. As a clinical psychologist, she has a practice as an adolescent and family therapist.

In the 1990s, Mogel and her husband began attending Jewish services. She took a year off to study the Torah and Talmud full-time. When she returned from her sabbatical, she applied what she studied to her practice. She also began teaching child-rearing classes and working with families using traditional Jewish teachings, particularly from Hasidic Judaism, as a guide to raising "good people," regardless of their religious background. Her research and its application in her practice became the foundation of The Blessing of a Skinned Knee and her subsequent books.

Mogel is an active author and public speaker on the topic of effective parenting and has spoken at the annual conferences of the National Association of Independent Schools, the American Camp Association, and the National Association of Episcopal Schools. She has appeared on The Today Show and is consulted frequently by national and international media as a parenting expert.

Mogel has two daughters and lives in Los Angeles.

== Books ==
- The Blessings of a Skinned Knee: Using Jewish Teachings to Raise Self-Reliant Children. Scribner. (2008) ISBN 1416593063
- The Blessing of a B Minus: Using Jewish Teachings to Raise Resilient Teenagers. Scribner. (2011) ISBN 1416542043
- Voice Lessons for Parents: What to Say, How to Say It, and When to Listen. Scribner. (2018)
