= Brett Johnson (writer) =

American television writer

- Occupation: Television Writer
- Writing career
- Notable works: Escape at Dannemora, Mad Men

Brett Johnson is an American television writer. He has worked on Ray Donovan and Mad Men, winning two Writers Guild of America-Best Drama Series Awards for the latter.

Johnson co-wrote the Mad Men episode "The Grown-Ups" with series creator and show runner Matthew Weiner, which went on to be nominated for the WGA award. Johnson and the writing staff also won the Writers Guild of America (WGA) Award for Best Drama Series at the February 2010 ceremony for their work on the third season.

In 2018, Johnson served as co-creator and showrunner of the miniseries Escape at Dannemora with Michael Tolkin. The series was based on the real-life 2015 Clinton Correctional Facility escape that led to a massive manhunt for two escape convicts in upstate New York.
