= Escape at Dannemora =

2018 television miniseries

- Genre: Drama; Thriller
- Created by: Brett Johnson; Michael Tolkin
- Written by: Brett Johnson; Michael Tolkin; Jerry Stahl
- Directed by: Ben Stiller
- Starring: Benicio del Toro; Patricia Arquette; Paul Dano; Bonnie Hunt; Eric Lange; David Morse
- Composer: Edward Shearmur
- Country of origin: United States
- Original language: English
- No. of episodes: 7

Production
- Executive producers: Bill Carraro; Nicholas Weinstock; Bryan Zuriff; Michael De Luca; Brett Johnson; Michael Tolkin; Ben Stiller
- Cinematography: Jessica Lee Gagné
- Editors: Geoffrey Richman; Malcolm Jamieson
- Running time: 51–98 minutes
- Production companies: Michael De Luca Productions; Red Hour Productions

Original release
- Network: Showtime
- Release: November 18 – December 30, 2018

Escape at Dannemora is an American crime drama television limited series that premiered on Showtime on November 18, 2018. It is based on the 2015 Clinton Correctional Facility escape. The seven-episode series was created and written by Brett Johnson and Michael Tolkin and directed by Ben Stiller. It stars Benicio del Toro, Patricia Arquette, Paul Dano, Bonnie Hunt, Eric Lange, and David Morse.

== Plot ==
The seven-episode series is based on the true story of the 2015 Clinton Correctional Facility escape in upstate New York. The breakout sparked a massive manhunt for two convicted murderers, Richard Matt and David Sweat, who were aided in their escape by Joyce "Tilly" Mitchell, a married prison employee entangled in secretive relationships with both men.

The series opens after the recapture of Matt and Sweat, with Tilly under arrest. Dressed in a striped jail uniform, she is interrogated about her involvement in the escape. The inspector general for the state questions her, pushing Tilly to reveal the full extent of her relationships with the two inmates, insisting the truth is already known and simply needs to be put on record.

From there, the story rewinds to Tilly’s life before the escape, highlighting her monotonous daily routine with her husband, Lyle Mitchell. Lyle is portrayed as a simple man with little imagination, minimal hobbies, and few ambitions. Both Tilly and Lyle work at Clinton Correctional Facility, like many of their friends and neighbors. Tilly oversees the prison’s tailor shop, where Matt and Sweat work under her supervision.

Early in the first episode, it’s revealed that Tilly is having a sexual relationship with Sweat, conducted in secret within the machine room of the tailor shop. The relationship, however, is not as clandestine as Tilly believes—most of the other inmates in the shop are well aware of what’s going on, setting the series up for the complex power dynamics and manipulations that drive the story forward.

== Cast ==
=== Main ===
- Benicio del Toro as Richard Matt, a convicted murderer
- Patricia Arquette as Joyce "Tilly" Mitchell, a married prison worker who becomes romantically entangled with both Matt and Sweat and aids in their escape
- Paul Dano as David Sweat, a convicted murderer
- Bonnie Hunt as Catherine Leahy Scott, the New York State Inspector General heading up a formal investigation of the Matt–Sweat prison escape
- Eric Lange as Lyle Mitchell, Tilly's husband and maintenance worker at Clinton Correctional
- David Morse as Gene Palmer, the inmate escort guard at Clinton Correctional

=== Recurring ===
- Jeremy Bobb as Dennis Lambert, a corrections officer and friend of Lyle
- Michael Beasley as Murder, an inmate who’s given Sweat’s job as shop supervisor upon his firing.
- Joshua Rivera as Angel, a fellow inmate of Matt and Sweat's.
- Carolyn Mignini as Ilene Mulvaney, Tilly’s supervisor who frequently butts heads with her
- Gregory Dann as Albert Boyd, the fearsome and most loathed correctional officer at Clinton Correctional. Matt and Sweat made their escape on Boyd's shift.

=== Guest ===
- Michael Imperioli as Andrew Cuomo, Governor of New York
- Charlie Hofheimer as Kenny Barrile, Sr.
- Jim Parrack as Kevin Tarsia, a deputy sheriff

== Production ==
Principal production commenced in Upstate New York from August 2017 to March 2018. For their roles, Patricia Arquette and Eric Lange each gained 40 pounds. Episode 6, the flashback episode, was filmed on 16 mm, unlike the rest of the series. Episode 6 was also filmed last so that Lange and Arquette could safely shed the weight they'd gained. Stiller later decided to shut down production for a month out of concern that they would not have enough time for weight loss. However, production was then further delayed three weeks to accommodate the birth of Lange's son.

== Episodes ==
No.	Title	Directed by	Written by	Original release date	U.S. viewers (millions)
1	"Part 1"	Ben Stiller	Brett Johnson & Michael Tolkin	November 18, 2018	0.397
2	"Part 2"	Ben Stiller	Brett Johnson & Michael Tolkin	November 25, 2018	0.487
3	"Part 3"	Ben Stiller	Jerry Stahl	December 2, 2018	0.559
4	"Part 4"	Ben Stiller	Brett Johnson & Michael Tolkin	December 9, 2018	0.541
5	"Part 5"	Ben Stiller	Brett Johnson & Michael Tolkin	December 16, 2018	0.664
6	"Part 6"	Ben Stiller	Brett Johnson & Michael Tolkin & Jerry Stahl	December 23, 2018	0.586
7	"Part 7"	Ben Stiller	Brett Johnson & Michael Tolkin	December 30, 2018	0.719

== Reception ==
=== Critical response ===
The series was met with acclaim upon its premiere. On the review aggregation website Rotten Tomatoes, the series holds an approval rating of 88% with an average rating of 7 out of 10, based on 60 reviews. The website's critical consensus reads, "Escape at Dannemora's slow pace demands patience, but those willing to wait will be rewarded with a chilling mystery that provides the perfect showcase for its talented cast — especially a nearly unrecognizable and unbearably moving performance from Patricia Arquette." Metacritic, which uses a weighted average, assigned the series a score of 78 out of 100 based on 27 critics, indicating "generally favorable reviews".

=== Response from Joyce Mitchell ===
In a December 2018 interview at the Bedford Hills Correctional Facility, Joyce Mitchell criticized some events portrayed in the miniseries. She claimed, "I never had sex with them", referring to Richard Matt and David Sweat. She also harshly criticized director Ben Stiller, calling him "a son-of-a-bitch liar just like the rest of the world. He doesn't care about the truth. All he cares about is making millions off me. He's an idiot."

=== Awards and nominations ===
Award	Category	Nominee(s)	Result	Ref.
Casting Society of America	Limited Series	Rachel Tenner, Nancy Mosser, Katie Shenot, Bess Fifer and Charlene Lee	Nominated	
Critics' Choice Awards	Best Movie/Miniseries	Escape at Dannemora	Nominated	
Critics' Choice Awards	Best Actor in a Movie/Miniseries	Paul Dano	Nominated	
Critics' Choice Awards	Best Actor in a Movie/Miniseries	Benicio del Toro	Nominated	
Critics' Choice Awards	Best Actress in a Movie/Miniseries	Patricia Arquette	Won (Note: Arquette shared the award in a tie with Amy Adams for Sharp Objects.)	
Critics' Choice Awards	Best Supporting Actor in a Movie/Miniseries	Eric Lange	Nominated	
Golden Globe Awards	Best Limited Series or Television Film	Escape at Dannemora	Nominated	
Golden Globe Awards	Best Actress – Miniseries or Television Film	Patricia Arquette	Won	
Directors Guild of America Awards	Outstanding Directing – Miniseries or TV Film	Ben Stiller	Won	
Primetime Emmy Awards	Outstanding Limited or Anthology Series	Ben Stiller, Michael Tolkin, Brett Johnson, Michael De Luca, Bryan Zuriff, Nicholas Weinstock, William Carraro, Adam Brightman and Lisa M. Rowe	Nominated	
Primetime Emmy Awards	Outstanding Lead Actor in a Limited Series or Movie	Benicio Del Toro	Nominated	
Primetime Emmy Awards	Outstanding Lead Actress in a Limited Series or Movie	Patricia Arquette	Nominated	
Primetime Emmy Awards	Outstanding Supporting Actor in a Limited Series or Movie	Paul Dano	Nominated	
Primetime Emmy Awards	Outstanding Directing for a Limited Series or Movie	Ben Stiller	Nominated	
Primetime Emmy Awards	Outstanding Writing for a Limited Series or Movie	Brett Johnson, Michael Tolkin and Jerry Stahl (for "Part 6")	Nominated	
Primetime Emmy Awards	Outstanding Writing for a Limited Series or Movie	Brett Johnson and Michael Tolkin (for "Part 7")	Nominated	
Primetime Creative Arts Emmy Awards	Outstanding Casting for a Limited Series or Movie	Rachel Tenner	Nominated	
Primetime Creative Arts Emmy Awards	Outstanding Contemporary Costumes	David Robinson, Ann Bryant and Barbara Hause (for "Part 6")	Nominated	
Primetime Creative Arts Emmy Awards	Outstanding Music Composition for a Limited Series, Movie, or Special (Original Dramatic Score)	Edward Shearmur (for "Part 5")	Nominated	
Primetime Creative Arts Emmy Awards	Outstanding Production Design for a Narrative Contemporary Program (One Hour or More)	Mark Ricker, James Truesdale and Cherish M. Hale	Nominated	
Primetime Creative Arts Emmy Awards	Outstanding Special Visual Effects	Steven Kirshoff, Joe Heffernan, John Bair, Djuna Wahlrab, Matthew Griffin, Shannen Walsh, Joseph Brigati, Vance Miller and Min Hwa Jung (for "Part 4")	Nominated	
Producers Guild of America Awards	Outstanding Producer of Limited Series Television	Ben Stiller, Nicholas Weinstock, Michael De Luca, Bryan Zuriff, Brett Johnson, Michael Tolkin, Bill Carraro, Adam Brightman and Lisa M. Rowe	Nominated	
Screen Actors Guild Awards	Outstanding Performance by a Female Actor in a Limited Series or TV Movie	Patricia Arquette	Won	
TCA Awards	Outstanding Achievement in Movies, Miniseries and Specials	Escape at Dannemora	Nominated	
TCA Awards	Individual Achievement in Drama	Patricia Arquette	Nominated	
