= Benicio del Toro =

Puerto Rican actor (born 1967)

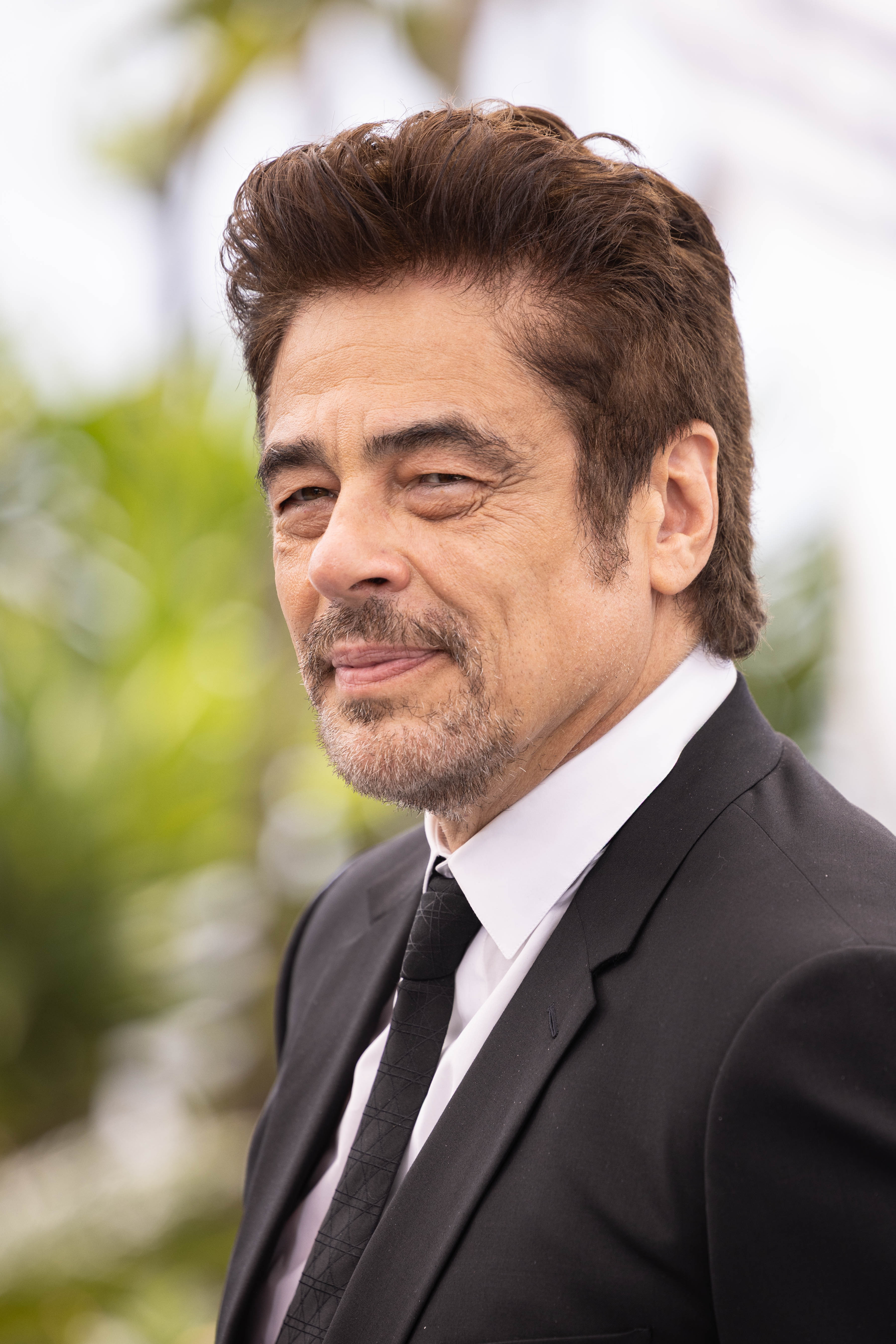
- Del Toro at the 2025 Cannes Film Festival
- Born: Benicio Monserrate Rafael del Toro Sánchez; February 19, 1967 (age 59); San Germán, Puerto Rico
- Citizenship: Spain; United States
- Education: University of California, San Diego
- Occupations: Actor; producer
- Years active: 1987–present
- Children: 1
- Awards: Full list

Benicio Monserrate Rafael del Toro Sánchez (Latin American Spanish: [beˈnisjo ðel ˈtoɾo]; born February 19, 1967) is a Puerto Rican actor. His accolades include an Academy Award, a BAFTA Award, a Golden Globe Award, a Goya Award, and the Best Actor awards at the Berlin International Film Festival and the Cannes Film Festival. Films in which he has appeared have grossed over $5.9 billion worldwide.

Del Toro made his film debut in Big Top Pee-wee (1988) before his breakout role playing an unintelligible crook in the crime thriller The Usual Suspects (1995), followed by roles in Basquiat (1996), Excess Baggage (1997), Fear and Loathing in Las Vegas (1998), and Snatch (2000). He received the Academy Award for Best Supporting Actor for his role as a morally upright police officer in Steven Soderbergh's crime drama Traffic (2000), and was nominated in the same category for playing an ex-con in Alejandro González Iñárritu's thriller 21 Grams (2003) and for playing a karate teacher in Paul Thomas Anderson's action comedy One Battle After Another (2025). He has also starred in Sin City (2005), Che (2008), Savages (2012), Inherent Vice (2014), Sicario (2015) and its sequel Sicario: Day of the Soldado (2018), and No Sudden Move (2021).

Del Toro also took franchise roles such as Dario in the James Bond film Licence to Kill (1989), Lawrence Talbot in The Wolfman (2010), the Collector in three films from 2013 to 2018 in the Marvel Cinematic Universe, and DJ the Codebreaker in Star Wars: The Last Jedi (2017). He has also worked with Wes Anderson in the films The French Dispatch (2021) and The Phoenician Scheme (2025). On television, he portrayed Richard Matt in the Showtime miniseries Escape at Dannemora (2018), for which he received a nomination for the Primetime Emmy Award for Outstanding Lead Actor in a Limited Series or Movie.

== Early life ==
Benicio Monserrate Rafael del Toro Sánchez was born on February 19, 1967, in the Santurce neighborhood of San Juan, Puerto Rico, to Gustavo Adolfo del Toro Bermúdez and Fausta Genoveva Sánchez Rivera (daughter of Benicio Sánchez Castaño and Lirio Belén Rivera), who were both lawyers. He has an older brother, Gustavo, who is the executive vice president and chief medical officer at the Wyckoff Heights Medical Center in the Bushwick section of Brooklyn, New York City. He had a Catalan paternal great-grandfather and a Basque maternal great-grandmother. Del Toro's great-grandfather was Rafael Rivera Esbrí, one of the heroes of the El Polvorin fire in Ponce, and who would also later become mayor of that city (1915–1917).

He spent most of his infancy in Santurce, a barrio within San Juan. Del Toro, whose childhood nicknames were "Skinny Benny" and "Beno", was raised a Roman Catholic, and attended Academia del Perpetuo Socorro (The Academy of Our Lady of Perpetual Help), a Roman Catholic school in Miramar, Puerto Rico. When del Toro was nine years old, his mother died of hepatitis. At age 15, he moved with his father and brother to Mercersburg, Pennsylvania, where he was enrolled at the Mercersburg Academy. He spent his adolescence and attended high school there. After graduation, del Toro followed the advice of his father and pursued a business degree at the University of California, San Diego. Success in an elective drama course encouraged him to drop out of college and study with noted acting teachers Stella Adler and Arthur Mendoza, in Los Angeles, as well as at the Circle in the Square Theatre School in New York City.

== Career ==
=== 1987–1999: Early roles and breakthrough ===
Del Toro surfaced in small television roles during the late 1980s, playing mostly thugs and drug dealers on programs such as Miami Vice and the NBC miniseries Drug Wars: The Camarena Story. He appeared in the 1987 music video for the Madonna song "La Isla Bonita" as a background character sitting on a car hood. Film roles followed, beginning with his debut in Big Top Pee-wee (1988) and as Dario in the James Bond film Licence to Kill (1989). Del Toro was noticed by directors and starred in such successful films as The Indian Runner (1991), China Moon (1994), Christopher Columbus: The Discovery (1992), Money for Nothing (1993), Fearless (1993) and Swimming with Sharks (1994).

His career gained momentum in 1995 with his breakout performance in The Usual Suspects, where he played the mumbling, wisecracking Fred Fenster. The role won him an Independent Spirit Award for Best Supporting Male and established him as a character actor. This led to stronger roles in independent and major studio films, including playing Gaspare in Abel Ferrara's The Funeral (1996) and winning a second consecutive Independent Spirit Award for Best Supporting Male for his work as Benny Dalmau in Basquiat (1996), directed by his friend, film-maker and painter Julian Schnabel. Del Toro also shared the screen with Robert De Niro in the big-budget thriller The Fan (1996), in which he played Juan Primo, a charismatic Puerto Rican baseball star. He subsequently starred opposite Alicia Silverstone in Excess Baggage (1997), which Silverstone produced. For Fear and Loathing in Las Vegas, the 1998 film adaptation of Hunter S. Thompson's famous book, despite the status of sex symbol he gained more than 40 lbs. (about 18 kg) to play Dr. Gonzo (a.k.a. Oscar Zeta Acosta), Thompson's lawyer and drug-fiend cohort.

=== 2000–2012: Traffic and other films ===
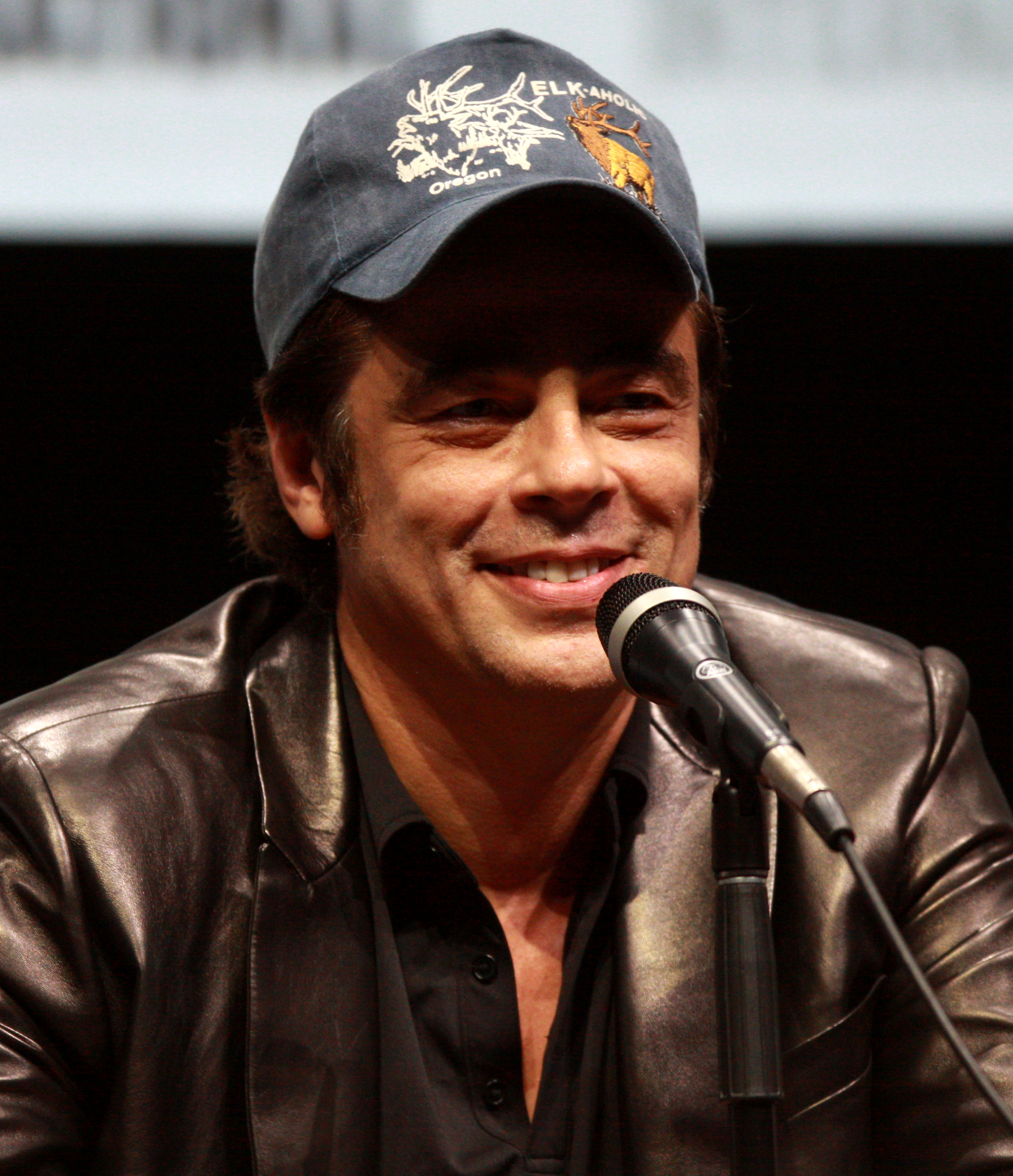
Del Toro at the 2013 San Diego Comic-Con

Del Toro's performances in four films in 2000 gained him a mainstream audience. First, the crime yarn The Way of the Gun reunited him with The Usual Suspects screenwriter Christopher McQuarrie. A few months later, he stood out among a first-rate ensemble cast in Steven Soderbergh's Traffic, a complex dissection of the North American drug wars. As Javier Rodriguez—a Mexican border policeman struggling to remain honest amid the corruption and deception of illegal drug trafficking—del Toro, who spoke most of his lines in Spanish, gave a performance that dominated the film. His performance swept all of the major critics' awards in 2001. Del Toro won the Academy Award for Best Supporting Actor, becoming the fourth living Oscar winner whose winning role was a character who speaks predominantly in a non-English language. Del Toro is also the third Puerto Rican actor to win an Oscar, after Jose Ferrer and Rita Moreno. The year he won his Oscar marked the first time that two actors born in Puerto Rico were nominated in the same category (the other actor was Joaquin Phoenix). In his acceptance speech, del Toro thanked the people of both Nogales, Arizona and Nogales, Sonora and dedicated his award to them. In addition to the Oscar, he also won the Actor Award for Best Leading Actor, as well as the BAFTA Award, and the Golden Globe Award for Best Supporting Actor. Traffic was also a success at the box office. This was soon followed by a small role as the diamond thief Franky Four Fingers in Guy Ritchie's hip caper comedy Snatch and a role as a mentally challenged Native American man in The Pledge, directed by his old friend Sean Penn.

In 2003, del Toro appeared in two films: The Hunted, co-starring Tommy Lee Jones and the drama 21 Grams, co-starring Sean Penn and Naomi Watts. He went on to earn another Best Supporting Actor Oscar nomination for his performance in the latter. He then appeared in the film adaptation of Frank Miller's graphic novel Sin City, directed by Robert Rodriguez, and Things We Lost in the Fire, the English-language debut of celebrated Danish director Susanne Bier.

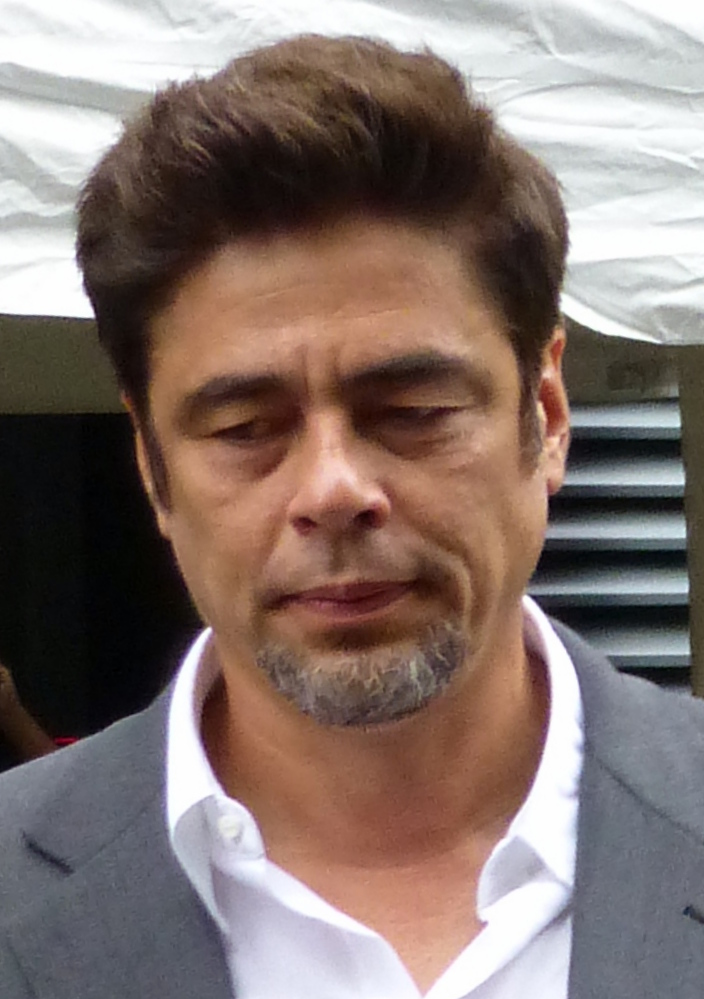
Del Toro at the 2014 Toronto International Film Festival

In 2008, del Toro was awarded the Prix d'interpretation masculine (or Best Actor Award) at the Cannes Film Festival for his portrayal of Che Guevara in the biographical films The Argentine and Guerrilla (together known as Che). During his acceptance speech, del Toro dedicated his award "to the man himself, Che Guevara" along with director Steven Soderbergh. Del Toro was also awarded the 2009 Goya Award as the Best Actor for his portrayal of Guevara. Sean Penn, who won the 2009 Best Actor Oscar for his performance in Milk, remarked that he was surprised and disappointed that Che and del Toro were not also up for any Academy Award nominations. During his acceptance speech for the Best Actor award at the Screen Actors Guild Awards, Penn expressed his dismay stating, "The fact that there aren't crowns on Soderbergh's and del Toro's heads right now, I don't understand... that is such a sensational movie, Che." For the final portions of the film (shown here), del Toro shed 35 pounds to show how ill Guevara had become near the end of his life in the jungles of Bolivia. In 2010, del Toro starred in and produced the remake of Lon Chaney Jr.'s classic cult film The Wolf Man (1941). He was chosen to be the face of the 2011 Campari calendar, becoming the first male model to be featured in the Italian liquor company's calendar.

=== 2013–present: franchise films and expansion ===
Del Toro played The Collector in a mid-credits scene of Marvel Studios' superhero film Thor: The Dark World (2013) and later reprised his role in Guardians of the Galaxy (2014) and Avengers: Infinity War (2018). In September 2015, del Toro played Alejandro Gillick in the critically acclaimed Sicario, about a Mexican ex-prosecutor seeking revenge for the slaying of his wife and daughter working with a CIA special ops team to bring down the leader of a powerful and brutal Mexican drug cartel. Film critics widely praised his performance. Del Toro reprised his role in the sequel Sicario: Day of the Soldado (2018). In 2016, del Toro appeared in a Heineken television advertisement in its More Behind the Star series. The gag in the spot is that fans frequently mistake him for fellow actor Antonio Banderas, much to del Toro's chagrin. In 2017, he played DJ (an abbreviation for "Don't Join", as DJ viewed the Resistance and the First Order as equally corrupt), a supporting antagonist in Star Wars: The Last Jedi, who betrayed Rose and Finn to save himself when they were apprehended on the First Order's flagship.

In 2021, del Toro starred in the Wes Anderson film The French Dispatch as Moses Rosenthaler, a mentally disturbed artist. He collaborated with the director once again in 2025 with The Phoenician Scheme. Also in 2025, del Toro received critical acclaim for his role as karate teacher and community leader Sergio St. Carlos in Paul Thomas Anderson's film One Battle After Another. For his work, he received Supporting Actor prizes from the New York Film Critics Circle, the National Society of Film Critics, and the National Board of Review, as well as Academy Award and Golden Globe nominations.

== Personal life ==
Del Toro was formerly romantically involved with Chiara Mastroianni, Alicia Silverstone and Valeria Golino. In April 2011, del Toro's publicist announced that del Toro and Kimberly Stewart were expecting a child, although they were not in a relationship. Stewart gave birth to a daughter, Delilah, on August 21, 2011. They had their daughter baptized in Puerto Rico.

On November 4, 2011, he acquired Spanish citizenship, along with fellow Puerto Rican Ricky Martin. The request was granted by the Spanish government in recognition of his artistic talents and for his Spanish ancestry (he has family in Barcelona).

In March 2012, he was granted an honorary degree by the Interamerican University of Puerto Rico for his influence on the cinema enterprise, during the celebration of the institution's centenary.

In 2003, del Toro became the spokesman of the educational campaign Yo Limpio a Puerto Rico, an environmental organization founded in 1997 by Ignacio Barsottelli, whose mission is to educate and mobilize Puerto Ricans in favor of recycling and the protection of the environment.

Del Toro narrated the public service announcement entitled "Coral Reef", joining the Artists to the Rescue of the Environment campaign.

== Filmography ==
=== Film ===
Year	Title	Role	Notes
1988	Big Top Pee-wee	Duke, The Dog-Faced Boy	
1989	Licence to Kill	Dario	
1991	The Indian Runner	Miguel Aguilera	
1992	Christopher Columbus: The Discovery	Alvaro Harana	
1993	Fearless	Manny Rodrigo	
1993	Golden Balls	Bob, the friend from Miami	
1993	Money for Nothing	Dino Palladino	
1994	Swimming with Sharks	Rex	
1994	China Moon	Detective Lamar Dickey	
1995	The Usual Suspects	Fred Fenster	
1995	Submission	—N/a	Short film; director, writer and producer only
1996	The Funeral	Gaspare Spoglia	
1996	The Fan	Juan Primo	
1996	Cannes Man	Himself	Cameo
1996	Basquiat	Benny Dalmau	
1997	Excess Baggage	Vincent Roche	
1997	Joyride	Detective López	
1998	Fear and Loathing in Las Vegas	Dr. Gonzo	
2000	Traffic	Javier Rodríguez Rodríguez	
2000	The Way of the Gun	Harold Longbaugh	
2000	Snatch	Franky "Four Fingers"	
2000	Bread and Roses	Himself	Uncredited cameo
2001	The Pledge	Toby Jay Wadenah	
2003	21 Grams	Jack Jordan	
2003	The Hunted	Sergeant Aaron Hallam	
2005	Sin City	Lieutenant Jack "Jackie Boy" Rafferty	
2007	Things We Lost in the Fire	Jerry Sunborne	
2008	Che	Che Guevara	Also producer
2010	The Wolfman	Lawrence Talbot / The Wolfman	Also producer
2010	Somewhere	Himself	Uncredited cameo
2011	The Upsetter	Narrator	Voice
2012	Savages	Miguel "Lado" Arroyo	
2012	7 Days in Havana	—N/a	Director only; segment: El Yuma
2013	Jimmy P: Psychotherapy of a Plains Indian	Jimmy Picard	
2013	Thor: The Dark World	Taneleer Tivan / The Collector	Uncredited cameo; mid-credits scene
2014	Guardians of the Galaxy	Taneleer Tivan / The Collector	
2014	Inherent Vice	Sauncho Smilax	
2014	Escobar: Paradise Lost	Pablo Escobar	
2015	A Perfect Day	Mambrú	
2015	Sicario	Alejandro Gillick	
2015	The Little Prince	The Snake	Voice
2017	Star Wars: The Last Jedi	D.J.	
2018	Avengers: Infinity War	Taneleer Tivan / The Collector	
2018	Sicario: Day of the Soldado	Alejandro Gillick	
2019	Dora and the Lost City of Gold	Swiper The Fox	Voice
2021	No Sudden Move	Ronald Russo	
2021	The French Dispatch	Moses Rosenthaler	
2023	Reptile	Detective Tom Nichols	Also co-writer and executive producer
2025	The Phoenician Scheme	Zsa-zsa Korda	
2025	One Battle After Another	Sensei Sergio St. Carlos	
TBA	All-Star Weekend	Dr. Phill	Completed

=== Television ===
Year	Title	Role	Notes
1987	Shell Game	Pedroza	Episode: "The Upstairs Gardener"
1987	Miami Vice	Pito	Episode: "Everybody's in Showbiz"
1987	Private Eye	Carlos	2 episodes
1987	Ohara	Mike	Episode: "And a Child Shall Lead Them"
1990	Drug Wars: The Camarena Story	Rafael Caro Quintero	Television miniseries
1994	Tales from the Crypt	Bill	Episode: "The Bribe"
1995	Fallen Angels	Paco	Episode: "Good Housekeeping"
2008	Todos Contra Juan	Himself	Episode: "Juan & La Critica"
2018	Escape at Dannemora	Richard Matt	7 episodes
2021	What If...?	Taneleer Tivan / The Collector (voice)	Episode: "What If... T'Challa Became a Star-Lord?"
2025	Saturday Night Live	Himself (cameo)	Episode: "Bad Bunny/Doja Cat"

=== Theme park attractions ===
Year	Title	Role	Venue
2017	Guardians of the Galaxy – Mission Breakout!	Taneleer Tivan / The Collector	Disney California Adventure

== See also ==
- List of Latin American Academy Award winners and nominees
- List of Spanish Academy Award winners and nominees
- List of Puerto Rican Academy Award winners and nominees
