= 2015 Clinton Correctional Facility escape =

U.S. prison escape

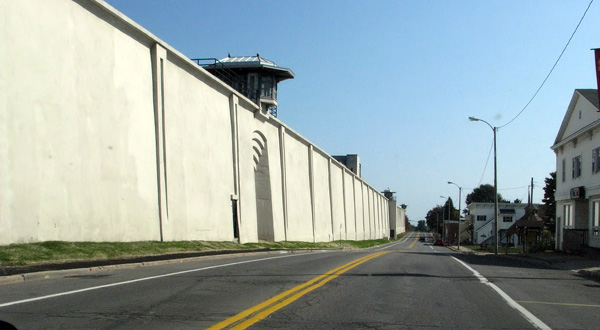
- Clinton Correctional Facility
- Date: June 6, 2015
- Location: Clinton Correctional Facility Village of Dannemora, New York, United States; 44°43′23″N 73°43′08″W
- Perpetrators: Richard Matt and David Sweat
- Outcome: Richard Matt killed; David Sweat captured; Joyce Mitchell pleaded guilty and sentenced to 7 years in prison
- Deaths: 1 (Matt)
- Injuries: 1 (Sweat)

The 2015 Clinton Correctional Facility escape was a jailbreak that took place on June 6, 2015, when two inmates, Richard Matt and David Sweat, were discovered missing during a 5:17 a.m. bed check at the maximum security Clinton Correctional Facility in Dannemora, New York, United States. Matt was serving 25 years to life and Sweat was serving life without parole, both for murder. The two prisoners had escaped by cutting a hole in their cell walls, gaining access to the utility areas behind and above their cells. Eventually they cut a hole in a steam pipe and used the pipe to escape from the prison into the city sewer, with tools obtained from two cooperating prison employees. Nearly three weeks after the escape, Matt was found in Malone, New York, where he was shot and killed; two days after that, Sweat was shot and taken into custody.

== Inmates ==
=== Richard Matt ===
Richard William Matt (June 25, 1966 – June 26, 2015) was born and raised in Tonawanda, New York, a suburb of Buffalo, and began receiving foster care along with his brother Robert early in life. Matt had behavioral issues in school, which included a reputation for "terroriz[ing] kids on the [school] bus". He was sent to a group home in his early teens for stealing a houseboat, but escaped by riding on a stolen horse, after which he hid in Allegany State Park. A career criminal, Matt served recurrent prison terms in the 1980s and 1990s for various crimes including burglary, rape, theft and assault. Matt had a history of escaping from correctional facilities.

On December 3, 1997, Matt and an accomplice named Lee Bates kidnapped William Rickerson, Matt's 76-year-old former boss, from his home in North Tonawanda in an attempt to rob him. Matt demanded to know the location of a large sum of money he believed Rickerson possessed. He and Bates drove to Ohio and back for approximately twenty-seven hours with Rickerson in the trunk of the car, periodically stopping to open the trunk to beat and torture their victim. Matt eventually killed Rickerson by breaking his neck before dismembering his body, throwing the parts into the Niagara River and escaping to Mexico.

On February 20, 1998, while in the border city of Matamoros, Tamaulipas, Matt murdered a second man, Charles Arnold Perreault, an American engineer working at a local factory. Matt tried to rob Perreault and then stabbed him to death at a bar as he was using the restroom. Matt was soon arrested and given a 23-year sentence for murder in a Mexican court. In 2007, he was extradited to the U.S. to face trial for Rickerson's murder, where Bates testified against him, and Matt received a 25-years to life sentence for second-degree murder, with no chance of parole until 2032. During the trial, authorities suspected he had a plan to escape from Niagara County Jail. Matt was made to wear a stun belt and snipers were posted outside the courtroom to prevent his escape.

An investigation conducted by the Erie County District Attorney's Office in 2021 (six years after Matt's death) concluded that Matt was responsible for the 1993 murder of Deborah Meindl, who was stabbed and strangled to death in her home in Tonawanda. Matt reportedly lived near the crime scene and had a "close relationship" with David Bentley, the homicide detective who led the investigation into Meindl's killing. Matt's fellow Clinton Correctional escapee David Sweat claimed that Matt admitted the murder to him whilst on the run. Two other men, Brian Scott Lorenz and James Pugh, had previously been convicted of the murder, and District Attorney John J. Flynn rejected his office's findings. In 2023 Judge Paul Wojtaszek overturned Pugh and Lorenz's convictions and ordered a new trial, although he did not suggest Matt was guilty and dismissed theories that Matt and Bentley had conspired together in the murder as "speculation, conjecture, and surmise without any substantiation or corroboration". Lorenz was convicted of the murder again at a retrial, while all charges against Pugh were dropped.

=== David Sweat ===
David Paul Sweat (born June 14, 1980) was raised in the Binghamton metropolitan area by his single mother, Pamela Sweat, along with his two sisters. Sweat had a troubled childhood characterized by violent tendencies. After being sent to Florida to be raised by an uncle, he stole and wrecked his aunt's car and soon went into foster care. By the time they were in their late teens, Sweat and his cousin Jeffrey A. Nabinger Jr. were sporadically homeless. The two held short-lived jobs and became involved in the trade of marijuana. Sweat was known for elaborately planning burglaries he intended to commit with Nabinger, and they were arrested several times in the late 1990s and were sent to prison.

In the early morning hours of July 4, 2002, Sweat, Nabinger and a third accomplice, Shawn Devaul, burglarized a gun store in Great Bend, Pennsylvania, to steal firearms. Upon returning to New York, they were spotted by Kevin Tarsia, a Broome County sheriff's deputy, while transferring the stolen firearms in a parking lot from one vehicle to another. Sweat opened fire on Tarsia, hitting him multiple times, before running him over with a car. As Tarsia was still alive, Nabinger shot him two more times in the face, killing him. The three men were arrested a few days later. During the trial, Sweat and Nabinger both pled guilty to first degree murder and received life without parole to avoid capital punishment. Devaul, who cooperated with authorities, was sentenced to five years in prison plus five years of supervised release. Unlike Matt, Sweat had no history of escaping from prison.

== Escape ==
On June 6, 2015, Matt and Sweat were unaccounted for during the 5:30 a.m. morning count, having been last seen at the 10:30 p.m. count the previous night. It was reported that an "external breach" was found on a street approximately 500 feet (150 m) outside of the prison wall. The inmates had tunneled out of the facility. Matt and Sweat had been housed in Honor Block, a privileged housing unit that allowed them access to cooking stations, televisions, wall-mounted telephones, showers, and card tables in the cell house at specified intervals during the day. According to news reports, the escapees used tools from contractors to cut their escape tunnel during the nights and returned them to their toolboxes afterwards.

The escape was elaborate and has been compared to the escape made in the 1962 Alcatraz escape and the fictional novella and film The Shawshank Redemption. New York Governor Andrew Cuomo took a tour of the facility later in the day of the escape with media present.

Authorities found that the two had planned to be picked up by a prison employee, Joyce Mitchell; however, according to a relative, Mitchell developed chest pains and was hospitalized. A second employee, prison guard Gene Palmer, was also charged with aiding the escape. Palmer admitted to investigators that he smuggled tools into the prison and did other favors for Richard Matt in exchange for paintings.

A note was left behind on the pipe the two escapees had cut to escape, reading, "Have a nice day," with a stereotypical "Asian smiley face" wearing a triangular rice hat.

== Manhunt ==
Authorities searched the farms and fields around the town of Willsboro, New York, after receiving a tip that Matt and Sweat might have been spotted there on June 9.

Authorities spent June 9 and 10 retracing their steps near Dannemora after searching Willsboro, and also expanded the search to the border with Vermont, saying the two may have tried to flee to that state. Authorities in Canada, including the Royal Canadian Mounted Police (RCMP) and departments along the border with the U.S., and Mexico, where Matt had previously been convicted of murder, were also alerted. The Federal Bureau of Investigation (FBI), United States Customs and Border Protection (CBP), the Bureau of Alcohol, Tobacco, Firearms and Explosives (ATF), state and local police, and the New York State Forest Rangers (the Adirondack Park Preserve covers the area) were all involved in the search, led by the local police and the United States Marshals Service working with prison officials. A $50,000 bounty was set for each inmate by Cuomo and was subsequently increased to $75,000 when the U.S. Marshals added $25,000 for each escapee. There were no reports of break-ins, robberies, or homicides, but there were two reported sightings.

On June 11, a stretch of nearby New York State Route 374 was closed until further notice. School classes were canceled in Dannemora and Saranac. Later that day, the number of officers present in the area near the prison was increased to more than 500, from the initial estimate of between 300 and 400. That afternoon and evening, after bloodhounds picked up a scent and authorities discovered a footprint and a wrapper, police began methodically searching, until nightfall, a wooded area near the nearby town of Cadyville, New York. Police, however, said this was not a lead that produced definite evidence that the escapees were still in that area. Areas of the more populous nearby city of Plattsburgh and parts of Lake Champlain had also been searched, and billboards asking for help were put up in New York, New Jersey, Massachusetts, Vermont, Pennsylvania, and along the Canada–U.S. border.

On June 12, the seventh day of the search, there were still no confirmed sightings of the escapees. Later that day, prison worker Joyce Mitchell was arrested and charged with aiding the escapees. On June 13, the search included helicopters, all-terrain vehicles, and search dogs. However, bad weather conditions, including rain, hampered search efforts. On June 20, the search continued in Allegany County in western New York based on a sighting in the town of Friendship, New York. On June 22, the search shifted back to an area near the prison after a cabin near Owls Head in Franklin County appeared to have been broken into. DNA from the inmates was found in the cabin, and investigators concluded that they had been there within the previous 24 hours. In the days after the escape, some prisoners reported having been beaten by guards in an attempt to obtain information as to the whereabouts and plans of the escaped inmates.

The manhunt and investigation were said to have cost about $23 million.

== Death of Matt, capture of Sweat ==
Matt was spotted in Franklin County, New York on June 26 after he shot at the driver of a passing recreational vehicle with a 20-gauge shotgun taken from a hunting camp. In the ensuing confrontation, he was shot and killed by three gunshot wounds to the head by U.S. Border Patrol Supervisory Agent and former Army Ranger Chris Voss in the wilderness of Owl's Head, south of Malone, New York, 50 miles (80 km) west of Clinton Correctional Facility. Sweat's location was unknown at the time of Matt's death.

On June 28, New York State Trooper Sgt. Jay Cook passed Sweat as he walked along the road. As Cook circled back to question him, Sweat began running across a hay field towards a tree line. Cook, a firearms instructor, gave chase, and when it became evident that Sweat might escape, fired two rounds from his .45-caliber Glock 37 pistol, hitting Sweat twice in his right shoulder and left arm at a range of 73 yards (67 m), near Constable, New York, roughly 16 miles (26 km) north of where Matt had been killed and just 1.5 miles (2.4 km) from the Canada–U.S. border. He was transported to the Alice Hyde Medical Center in Malone. He was later transferred, in critical condition, to Albany Medical Center. His condition was later upgraded to fair by July 1. Sweat was moved on July 5 to a Special Housing Unit in the maximum security Five Points Correctional Facility in Romulus, New York.

== Investigation ==
On June 15, 2015, Governor Andrew Cuomo directed Inspector General Catherine Leahy Scott to conduct a thorough investigation to determine all factors potentially involved in the escape of inmates Richard Matt and David Sweat from Clinton Correctional Facility. At the governor's instruction, the Inspector General was to secure the services of a respected outside expert in corrections and law enforcement on issues such as prison design, operations, and security, with a view toward identifying how these inmates were able to escape, and recommend any potential reforms and best practices to prevent future incidents.

On the morning of June 16, Mitchell confessed to her involvement with the prisoners still eluding capture. The Associated Press reported Mitchell had confirmed providing Matt and Sweat with hacksaw blades, chisels, and other tools. According to Clinton County District Attorney Andrew Wylie, who oversaw the prosecution of Mitchell, "[s]he had agreed to be the getaway driver, but backed out because she still loved her husband and felt guilty for participating." The report also noted that the manholes used by the two inmates had since been welded shut. "Ms. Mitchell was Plan A and there was no Plan B, which is why authorities have now been concentrating their search to a perimeter around the maximum security prison," Wylie said. According to the Associated Press, Mitchell waived a preliminary hearing, allowing the case to immediately proceed in county court.

On June 17, it was revealed that Mitchell, who had been suspended without pay from a $57,000-a-year position she held, had discussed having her husband, Lyle, killed in a potential murder-for-hire deal with Matt, to whom she had been close, and Sweat. According to Joyce Mitchell's confession, Matt referred to her husband, Lyle, as the "glitch" and planned to kill him after the escape. Matt reportedly gave Mitchell two pills to give Lyle to incapacitate him to facilitate the murder. Reportedly, she later decided not to go through with Matt's plan and threw away the two pills out of sentiment for her husband. Authorities did not believe Mitchell's husband knew of or participated in the breakout. According to the Press-Republican, he visited his wife on June 16 and then the New York State Police barracks in Malone, New York, the next day, to speak with authorities. The search then expanded to an area that was being searched beyond the 16 square miles around the prison. Some roadblocks were lifted and the force reduced from over 800 to about 600.

Police received several tips during the last few days of the manhunt. They also deduced that Matt had fallen ill due to consuming spoiled food or dirty water, based on soiled undergarments discovered at one of the cabins the duo had broken into. Further investigation led to police finding Matt. Interrogations with Sweat after his capture revealed he and Matt practiced their escape once in the prison and were nearly found on two occasions during the manhunt. During the first instance, he and Matt were hiding in a cabin when three people arrived to check on it, debated whether they should stay or leave, and then left. On the second instance, Sweat was hiding in a hunting tree stand that was passed by a police officer. Sweat also claimed he and Matt separated on June 23 after Matt became unfocused and was "slowing him down". An autopsy of Matt was released on August 6, which verified his cause of death as skull fractures and brain damage from being shot. It also revealed he had a blood alcohol level of 0.18%.

== Aftermath ==
Sweat pleaded guilty to two felony counts of first-degree escape and an additional count of promoting prison contraband. He was sentenced to three-and-a-half to seven years, to be served consecutively with his previous life sentence. He was further ordered to pay $79,841 in restitution. In March 2022, Sweat, known for a history of hunger strikes in prison, was authorized by a judge to be force-fed, who additionally ordered Sweat to comply with the force feeding as well as cooperate with hydration and necessary medical treatment. The state was also granted permission by the judge to use physical restraints, medications, and chemical sedation if necessary.

Joyce Mitchell, defended by a Clinton County public defender, pleaded guilty to promoting prison contraband and criminal facilitation. She was sentenced to two-and-a-third to seven years in prison, fined $6,375, and ordered to pay $79,841 in restitution. Mitchell was granted parole and released from prison in February 2020.

Gene Palmer pleaded guilty to promoting prison contraband, a felony, and was sentenced to 6 months in jail and fined $5,375. He served four months and was released for good behavior.

The Inspector General's report was released in June 2016 and found "that longstanding, systemic failures in management and oversight by DOCCS enabled two convicted murderers to meticulously orchestrate their escape from a maximum security facility almost in plain sight." The report noted the failures of 20 individual correctional employees, both civilian and uniformed. Other than Palmer and Mitchell, no criminal charges were brought against any prison employee. One was demoted, two were suspended pending arbitration, nine returned to work after lesser penalties were applied, and the remainder retired or resigned before being punished. The report was highly critical of a lack of cooperation, and misleading and lying testimony by prison employees.

== In popular culture ==
On February 10, 2016, Law and Order: Special Victims Unit aired an episode called "Nationwide Manhunt" that reflected and referenced the events that transpired with the Clinton Facility Escape.

The escape was the subject of a television movie in 2017, New York Prison Break: The Seduction of Joyce Mitchell. Penelope Ann Miller starred as Joyce Mitchell, with Matt played by Myk Watford and Joe Anderson as Sweat. It was directed and written by Stephen Tolkin, and aired on the Lifetime Network.

In 2018, the story of the escape was adapted into a seven-part television miniseries for Showtime, Escape at Dannemora, created and written by Brett Johnson and Michael Tolkin, directed by Ben Stiller and starring Benicio del Toro as Matt, Paul Dano as Sweat, and Patricia Arquette as Mitchell. Mitchell criticized the mini-series, which includes several prison sex scenes, for containing "lies" and denied having sexual relations with Sweat; she admitted to having sex with Matt but claimed she was forced to.

On December 15, 2018, Oxygen Network premiered a special entitled Dannemora Prison Break, which features Bryce Dallas Howard as the narrator.

In 2021, the escape was featured in an episode of Great Escapes With Morgan Freeman on the History Channel.
