= Jeff Wadlow =

American filmmaker (born 1976)

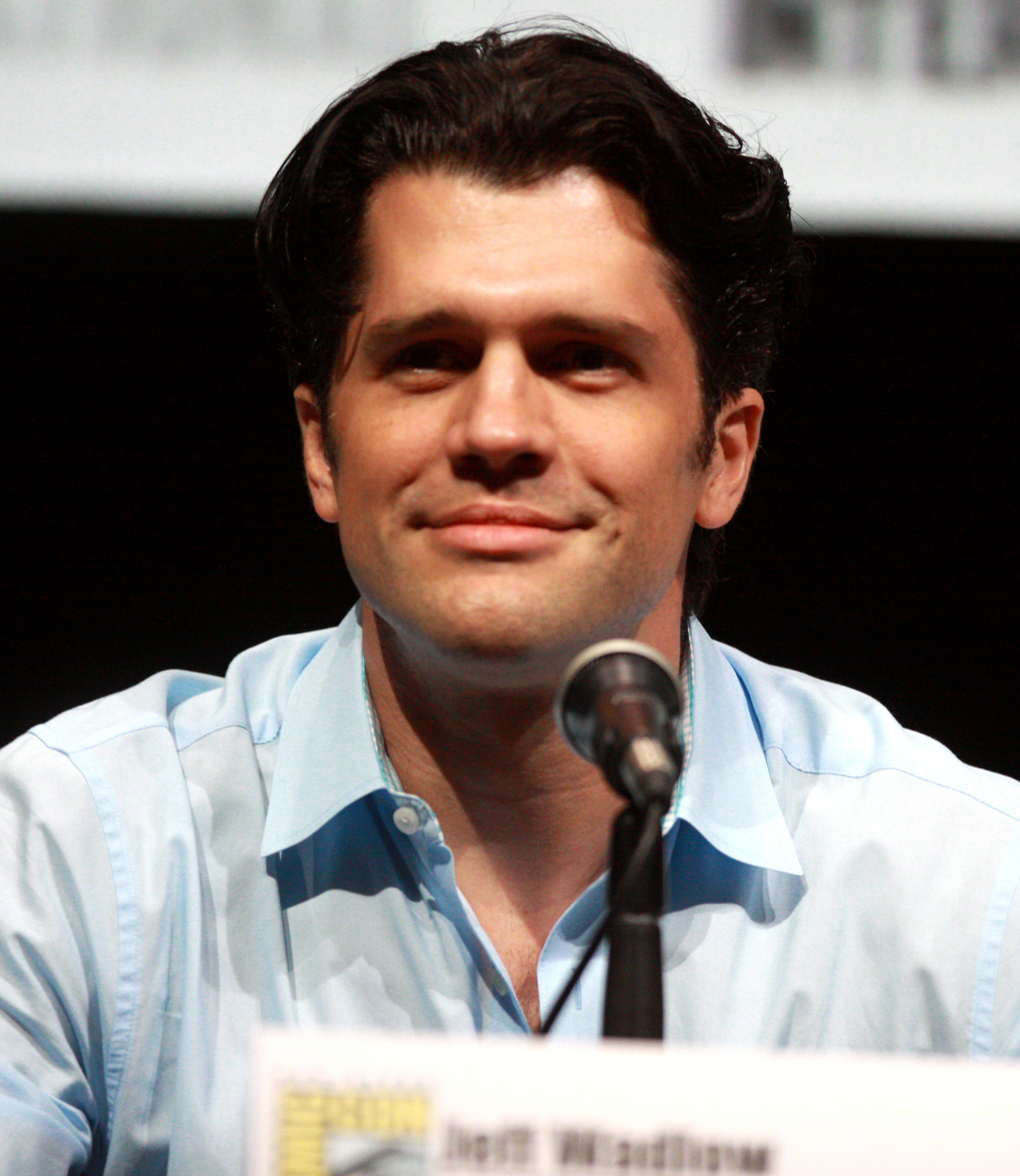
- Wadlow at San Diego Comic-Con 2013
- Born: Jeffrey Clark Wadlow; March 2, 1976 (age 50); Arlington, Virginia, U.S.
- Education: Dartmouth College; University of Southern California School of Cinema-Television
- Occupations: Film director; screenwriter; producer
- Years active: 1996–present
- Spouse: Lindy Booth (m. 2014; div. 2020)
- Mother: Emily Couric
- Relatives: Katie Couric (aunt)

Jeffrey Clark Wadlow (born March 2, 1976) is an American filmmaker. He is best known for writing, producing and directing feature films, including Kick-Ass 2 (2013), Truth or Dare (2018), Fantasy Island (2020), and Imaginary (2024). In 2022, Wadlow was nominated for a DGA award for Outstanding Directorial Achievement in Children's Programs.

== Early life ==
Wadlow was born in Arlington, Virginia, the son of Emily Couric, a state senator, and R. Clark Wadlow. He is the nephew of journalist Katie Couric. Wadlow attended Dartmouth College, graduating with a B.A. in history and film. After receiving his undergraduate degree, he attended the University of Southern California School of Cinema-Television on a USC Associates Endowment Scholarship for academic achievement. Wadlow graduated from USC in 2001.

== Career ==
=== Writing and directing ===
==== Film ====
Wadlow's short film, tHE tOWeR oF BabBLe (2002), received more than two dozen awards, including: Best Short Film at the New York International Independent Film and Video Festival, Best Short Film at the St. Louis International Film Festival, the George Méliès Cinematography Award at the Taos Talking Picture Festival, and a Student Award at USA Film Festival.

In 2005, Wadlow came up with the idea for his theatrical directorial debut Cry Wolf with the money Wadlow won in the 2002 Chrysler Million Dollar Film Competition.

In 2008, Wadlow directed the film Never Back Down, starring Djimon Hounsou and Sean Faris. The movie won the MTV movie award for "Best Fight."

In 2013, Wadlow also wrote and directed Kick-Ass 2, the sequel to the 2010 black comedy superhero film Kick-Ass.

Wadlow wrote and directed True Memoirs of an International Assassin in 2016, starring Kevin James and Andy Garcia, which was among the first original feature films for Netflix.

Wadlow directed, executive produced and co-wrote the horror film, Truth or Dare, starring Lucy Hale and Tyler Posey, in 2018. The premise of the movie surrounds the popular party game, Truth or Dare, and the deadly results that ensue from a group of friends playing while on a spring break trip to Mexico.

In 2020, Wadlow directed, produced and co-wrote the film Fantasy Island, inspired by a 1970s television show with the same name. That same year, Wadlow wrote the story and co-wrote the screenplay for the action thriller Bloodshot, starring Vin Diesel and based on the 1990s comic book.

In 2022, Wadlow directed and executive produced The Curse of Bridge Hollow, a Halloween movie streaming on Netflix starring Marlon Wayans.

Wadlow's forthcoming horror film, Imaginary, which he directed, produced and co-wrote, was scheduled for release in 2024. The film grapples with the idea of a childhood imaginary friend, in this case a Teddy bear, turning evil. The film is Wadlow's third collaboration with Jason Blum and is financed by Blumhouse Productions and Lionsgate Films.

==== Television ====
Wadlow was a writer and executive producer for the television series, Bates Motel, starring Freddie Highmore and Vera Farmiga, and also for the final season of the series, The Strain. He wrote two pilots picked up by CBS, The Odds in 2010 and Hail Mary in 2011, on which he was also an executive producer.

In 2017, Wadlow directed and executive produced YouTube Premium series, Ryan Hansen Solves Crimes on Television, starring Ryan Hansen and Samira Wiley.

In 2021, Wadlow directed and executive produced the re-boot of the classic 1990's television show, Are You Afraid of the Dark? for Paramount/Nickelodeon. Wadlow was nominated for a DGA award for Outstanding Directorial Achievement in Television, Commercials and Documentary for his work on the series.

=== Acting ===
In 2001, Wadlow played a small role in Pearl Harbor and a professor on an episode of the sci-fi television series Roswell. The following year, Wadlow performed in the short, tHE tOWeR oF BabBLe (2002), which he also co-wrote and directed. In 2007, Wadlow played Billy in the independent romantic comedy, I'm Through with White Girls (2007), starring Anthony Montgomery.

== The Adrenaline Film Project ==
Wadlow founded The Adrenaline Film Project in 2004 during the Virginia Film Festival. An annual event, the project involves teams of amateur filmmakers (aged high school and college) writing, casting, directing, and editing short films in a 72 hour time frame under the mentorship of Wadlow and other industry leaders. Each film, with a duration or five minutes or less, is screened at the end of the competition to be judged for the three cash awards: audience, mentor and jury prizes.

== Filmography ==
=== Short films ===
Year	Title	Director	Writer	Notes
2002	The Tower of Babble	Yes	Story	George Méliès Cinematography Award; NYIIFV Grand Jury Prize for Best Short Film; SLIFF Award for Best Dramatic Short; USA Film Festival, Student Award; Nominated – Deauville Film Festival – Best Short Film
2002	Manual Labor	Yes	Yes	Also editor, Wine Country Film Festival – Best Short Film (Domestic)
2004	Catching Kringle	Yes	Story	Jury Award for Best Short Film – Animated

=== Feature films ===
Year	Title	Director	Writer	Producer	Notes
2005	Cry Wolf	Yes	Yes	No	
2007	Prey	No	Yes	No	
2008	Never Back Down	Yes	No	No	
2013	Kick-Ass 2	Yes	Yes	No	
2014	Non-Stop	No	No	Executive	
2016	True Memoirs of an International Assassin	Yes	Yes	No	
2018	Truth or Dare	Yes	Yes	Executive	
2020	Fantasy Island	Yes	Yes	Yes	
2020	Bloodshot	No	Yes	No	
2022	The Curse of Bridge Hollow	Yes	No	Executive	
2024	Imaginary	Yes	Yes	Yes	
2026	The Devil's Mouth	Yes	No	Yes	

=== Television ===
Year	Title	Director	Writer	Executive Producer	Notes
2010	The Odds	No	Yes	Yes	
2011	Hail Mary	No	Yes	Yes	
2013	Bates Motel	No	Yes	Yes	Consulting producer, 6 episodes Writer, episodes "Ocean View" and "What's Wrong with Norman"
2015	Agent X	Yes	No	No	Episode: "Long Walk Home"
2017	The Strain	No	Yes	Yes	10 episodes Writer, episode "Belly of the Beast"
2019	Ryan Hansen Solves Crimes on Television	Yes	No	Yes	8 episodes
2021	Are You Afraid of the Dark?: Curse of the Shadows	Yes	No	Yes	4 episodes

=== Acting roles ===
Year	Title	Role	Notes
2001	Pearl Harbor	Next Guy In Line #1	
2001	Roswell	Professor	Episode: "Baby, It's You"
2002	The Tower of Babble	Derek	
2007	I'm Through with White Girls	Billy	

=== Other credits ===
Year	Title	Notes
1996	The Pallbearer	Office production assistant (as Jeffrey Clark Wadlow)
1999	The Big Kahuna	Set production assistant (as Jeffrey C. Wadlow)
