= David Palmer (director) =

American film director and cinematographer

David Palmer is an American film director and cinematographer. He co-directed the feature films Brother's Justice (2010) and Hit and Run (2012) with Dax Shepard, and directed the Showtime documentary Stripped: Greg Friedler's Naked Las Vegas (2010), later released as America Stripped: Naked Las Vegas.

== Career ==
Palmer is from New York. He began his career directing music videos, including videos for Nelly and The Dandy Warhols, and also made two half-hour television documentaries for the surf company Rip Curl.

In 2007, he was hired to document photographer Greg Friedler's final Naked art-book project in Las Vegas. Palmer directed and shot the film, and returned to the subjects a year after the book was finished to complete it. Stripped: Greg Friedler's Naked Las Vegas premiered on Showtime on March 18, 2010, with local screenings at the Onyx Theatre in Las Vegas.Before the broadcast, Palmer and Friedler presented it at a Denver Film Society screening on March 11, 2010. The film was reviewed by Las Vegas Weekly. It was later released in the United States under the title America Stripped: Naked Las Vegas.

Palmer co-directed and shot the mockumentary Brother's Justice, written by and starring Shepard, with Tom Arnold, Bradley Cooper and David Koechner. It screened at the 2010 Austin Film Festival and was released by Tribeca Film in May 2011.

Palmer and Shepard co-directed Hit and Run, an action comedy starring Shepard, Kristen Bell and Bradley Cooper, released by Open Road Films on August 22, 2012. Reviews in Screen Daily, The Austin Chronicle and The A.V. Club discussed the directors' handling of the film's car chases and action scenes.

== Filmography ==
Year	Title	Role	Notes
2010	Stripped: Greg Friedler's Naked Las Vegas (also America Stripped: Naked Las Vegas)	Director, cinematographer	Documentary; Showtime
2010	Brother's Justice	Co-director (with Dax Shepard), cinematographer	Released by Tribeca Film, 2011
2012	Hit and Run	Co-director (with Dax Shepard)	Released by Open Road Films
