= Ryan Hansen Solves Crimes on Television =

Television series

- Genre: Action comedy
- Created by: Rawson Marshall Thurber
- Starring: Ryan Hansen
- Composer: Joseph Shirley
- Country of origin: United States
- Original language: English
- No. of seasons: 2
- No. of episodes: 16

Production
- Executive producers: Tracey Baird; Beau Bauman; Krysia Plonka; Scott Stuber; Rawson Marshall Thurber
- Producers: Stephanie Meurer; Ryan Hansen
- Camera setup: Single-camera
- Running time: 23–33 minutes
- Production companies: Bluegrass Television No. 93; Thank You, Brain! Productions; Bad Version

Original release
- Network: YouTube Premium
- Release: October 25, 2017 – January 30, 2019

Ryan Hansen Solves Crimes on Television is an action comedy series created by Rawson Marshall Thurber and starring Ryan Hansen that premiered on October 25, 2017, on YouTube Red (now YouTube Premium). In July 2018, it was announced that the series had been renewed for a second season which premiered on January 30, 2019.

On April 10, 2019, YouTube canceled the series.

== Premise ==
Ryan Hansen Solves Crimes on Television is "set in a world where the LAPD thinks it’s a good idea to form a task force partnering actors with homicide detectives to take advantage of their “actor skills” and industry connections to help solve murders."

== Cast and characters ==
=== Main ===
- Ryan Hansen as himself

=== Recurring ===
- Samira Wiley as Jessica Mathers
- Aly Michalka as Amy
- Wood Harris as Vince Vincente
- Evangeline Lindes as Crosby
- Noelle E Parker as Millie
- Jon Cryer as himself
- Sydney Brower as Everett
- Karen David as Priya
- Eric Christian Olsen as himself
- Barry Shabaka Henley as Captain Jackson #3 and #8
- Jessica St. Clair as Captain Lade'e
- Joel McHale as himself
- Donald Faison as himself

=== Guest ===
- James McDaniel as Captain Jackson #1 ("Pilot")
- Steve Harris as Captain Jackson #2 ("Jane D'Oh!")
- Leslie David Baker as Captain Jackson #4 ("Trafficking and the Traffic King")
- Frankie Faison as Captain Jackson #5 ("Hungry for Justice")
- Mary Birdsong as Dorothy Montclair ("Hungry for Justice")
- Arielle Vandenberg as herself ("Joel McHale Is: Ryan Hansen")
- Yvette Nicole Brown as Captain Jackson #7 ("Freezed")
- Kristen Bell as herself ("Freezed")
- Peter Berg as himself ("Eight Is the New Se7en")
- Ken Marino as himself ("The Office Party")
- Amanda Cerny as herself ("Like and Subscribe")
- Jillian Bell as herself ("The Ry Chromosome")
- Lucy Hale as herself ("The Ry Chromosome")
- Rob Corddry as himself ("For Your Inconsideration")
- Jane Lynch as herself ("For Your Inconsideration")
- Ben Schwartz as himself ("Execution Dependent")
- Dax Shepard as himself ("Execution Dependent")

== Episodes ==
Series overview
Season	Episodes	Originally released
1	8	October 25, 2017
2	8	January 30, 2019

=== Season 1 (2017) ===
No. overall	No. in season	Title	Directed by	Written by	Original release date
1	1	"Pilot"	Rawson Marshall Thurber	Rawson Marshall Thurber	October 25, 2017
2	2	"Jane D'Oh!"	Rawson Marshall Thurber	Rawson Marshall Thurber	October 25, 2017
3	3	"Joel McHale Is: Ryan Hansen"	Tristram Shapeero	Adam Cole-Kelly & Sam Pitman	October 25, 2017
4	4	"Trafficking and the Traffic King"	Tristram Shapeero	Matteo Borghese & Rob Turbovsky	October 25, 2017
5	5	"Hungry For Justice"	Tristram Shapeero	Matteo Borghese & Rob Turbovsky	October 25, 2017
6	6	"Escape Room Escapades"	Tristram Shapeero	Paul Fruchbom	October 25, 2017
7	7	"Freezed"	Tristram Shapeero	Jackie Clarke	October 25, 2017
8	8	"Eight is the New Se7en"	Tristram Shapeero	Joel Church-Cooper	October 25, 2017

=== Season 2 (2019) ===
No. overall	No. in season	Title	Directed by	Written by	Original release date
9	1	"Revival"	Rawson Marshall Thurber	Sam Sklaver	January 30, 2019
10	2	"The Office Party"	Jeff Wadlow	Paul Fruchbom	January 30, 2019
11	3	"Like and Subscribe"	Jeff Wadlow	Matteo Borghese & Rob Turbovsky	January 30, 2019
12	4	"I'm Sorry, She "Class" Passed"	Jeff Wadlow	Ari Berkowitz	January 30, 2019
13	5	"The Ry Chromosome"	Jeff Wadlow	Molly Prather	January 30, 2019
14	6	"For Your Inconsideration"	Jeff Wadlow	Chadd Gindin	January 30, 2019
15	7	"The Ry Guy Goes to Jail"	Beau Bauman	Matteo Borghese & Rob Turbovsky	January 30, 2019
16	8	"Execution Dependent"	Rawson Marshall Thurber	Shawn Ries	January 30, 2019

== Production ==
=== Development ===
On June 22, 2017, it was announced that YouTube had given the production a series order for a first season consisting of eight episodes. The series was created by director Rawson Marshall Thurber who was set to executive produce alongside Scott Stuber, Beau Bauman, Krysia Plonka and Tracey Baird. Ryan Hansen was expected to serve as a producer. On July 27, 2018, it was announced that the series had been renewed for a second season expected to premiere in 2019. On December 17, 2018, it was announced that season two would premiere on January 30, 2019.

=== Casting ===
Alongside the series order announcement, it was confirmed that the series would star Ryan Hansen with guest stars including Joel McHale, Jon Cryer, and Kristen Bell, among others.

=== Filming ===
Principal photography for season two began on July 26, 2018 in Los Angeles, California.

== Reception ==
Ryan Hansen Solves Crimes on Television has received mixed reviews from critics at launch. On Metacritic, which assigns a normalized rating to reviews, the series has a weighted average score of 56 out of 100, based on 5 critics, indicating "mixed or average reviews". Mike Hale of The New York Times said in a mixed review, "Solves Crimes has potential, but its problem is hard-wired into its premise and its venue: You wish that someone more interesting to watch than Mr. Hansen were at the center of it. There’s no compelling reason to watch, but you might get a kick out of it." Dan Fienberg of The Hollywood Reporter commented that the show is "bloated and sloppy and amateurish in a way that occasionally rises to the level of 'gleeful,' but it's occasionally hilarious and delivers a much more scathing, granular and detailed satire of the television business and Hollywood fame than the facile yuks of Showtime's departed, overpraised Episodes."
