= Ryan Hansen =

American actor (born 1981)

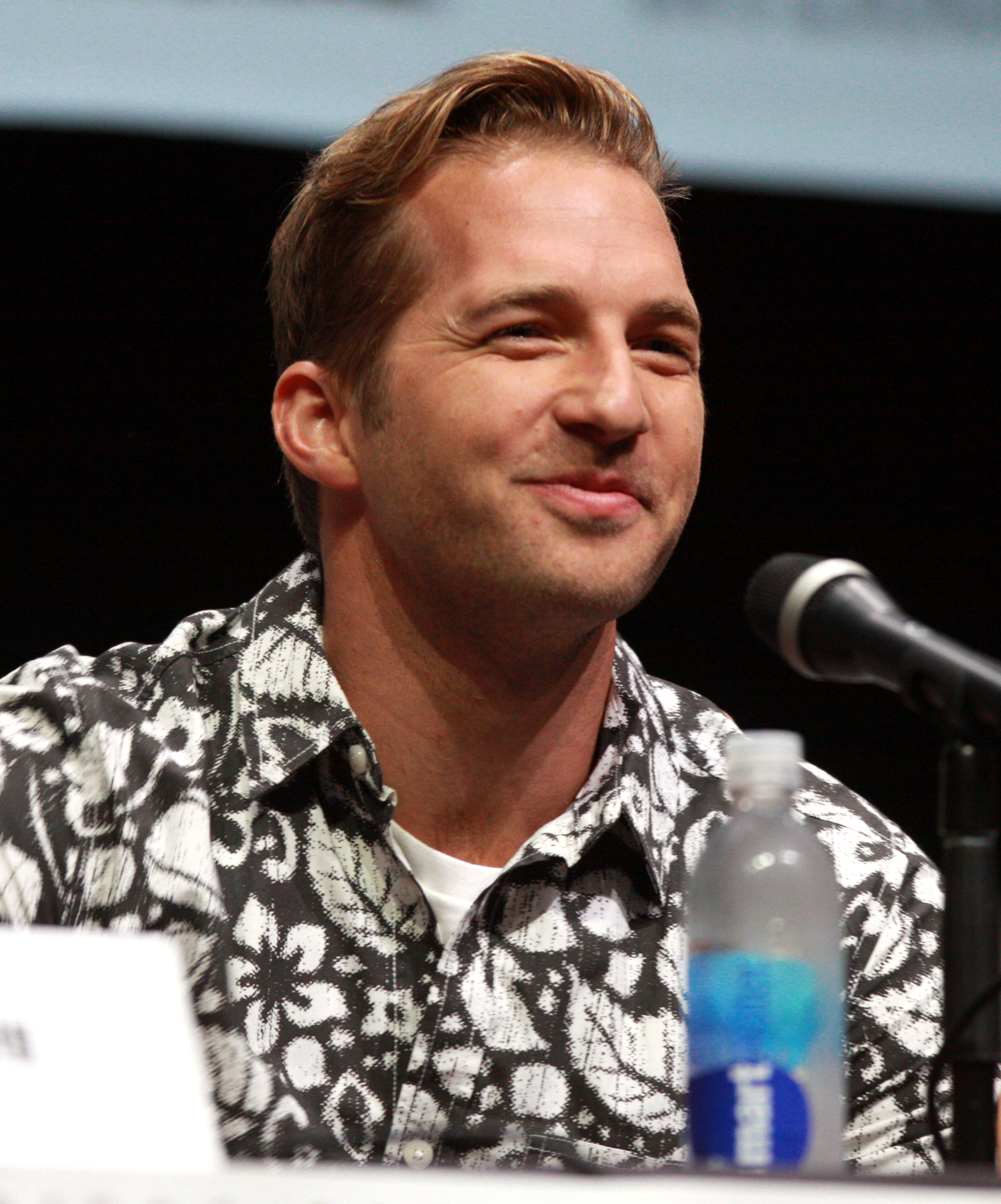
- Hansen at the 2013 San Diego Comic-Con
- Born: July 5, 1981 (age 45)
- Occupation: Actor
- Years active: 2001–present
- Spouse: Amy Russell (m. 2004)
- Children: 3
- Relatives: Jason Russell (brother-in-law)

Ryan Hansen (born July 5, 1981) is an American actor. He is best known for starring as Dick Casablancas on the noir drama series Veronica Mars (2004–2007, 2019), as Kyle Bradway on the Starz comedy series Party Down (2009–2010, 2023), and as Nolan in the horror remake film Friday the 13th (2009). Hansen also had a recurring role on the comedy series 2 Broke Girls (2012–2017) and the web series Burning Love (2012–2013).

== Career ==
Hansen began acting with guest-starring roles on series such as Grounded for Life, That's So Raven, and Las Vegas. In 2004, Hansen auditioned for the role of Duncan Kane on Veronica Mars but lost out to Teddy Dunn. However, Rob Thomas told him to try out for the role of Dick Casablancas.

In 2008, Hansen appeared in Superhero Movie, released on March 28. In 2008, Hansen appeared in the CCT original musical Alice as Trevor McKnight/White Night. The show opened on July 31 and ran through August 10, in San Diego.

In 2011, Hansen portrayed Ben Lewis on the NBC sitcom Friends with Benefits.

BuddyTV ranked him #79 on its list of "TV's Sexiest Men of 2011".

In 2012, he began a recurring role as Andy, the candy shop owner, on the CBS sitcom 2 Broke Girls. The same year he had a supporting role in the film Hit and Run alongside Dax Shepard, Kristen Bell and Bradley Cooper.

On October 25, 2017, the new YouTube Premium series Ryan Hansen Solves Crimes on Television premiered, in which Hansen plays a fictionalized version of himself, as the show's title character.

In 2020, he starred opposite Jimmy O. Yang in two films, Like a Boss and Fantasy Island, released a month apart. In the former film, their characters were business partners, and in the latter, they were step-siblings who were strongly fond of each other.

== Personal life ==
Hansen married Amy Russell in 2004. The couple were Kristen Bell's housemates for two years. Hansen and Russell have three daughters.

Hansen has supported Invisible Children, which was founded by his brother-in-law Jason Russell. In 2010, he appeared in the online series The LXD: The Legion of Extraordinary Dancers, with 50% of the profits going to the Invisible Children campaign.

== Filmography ==
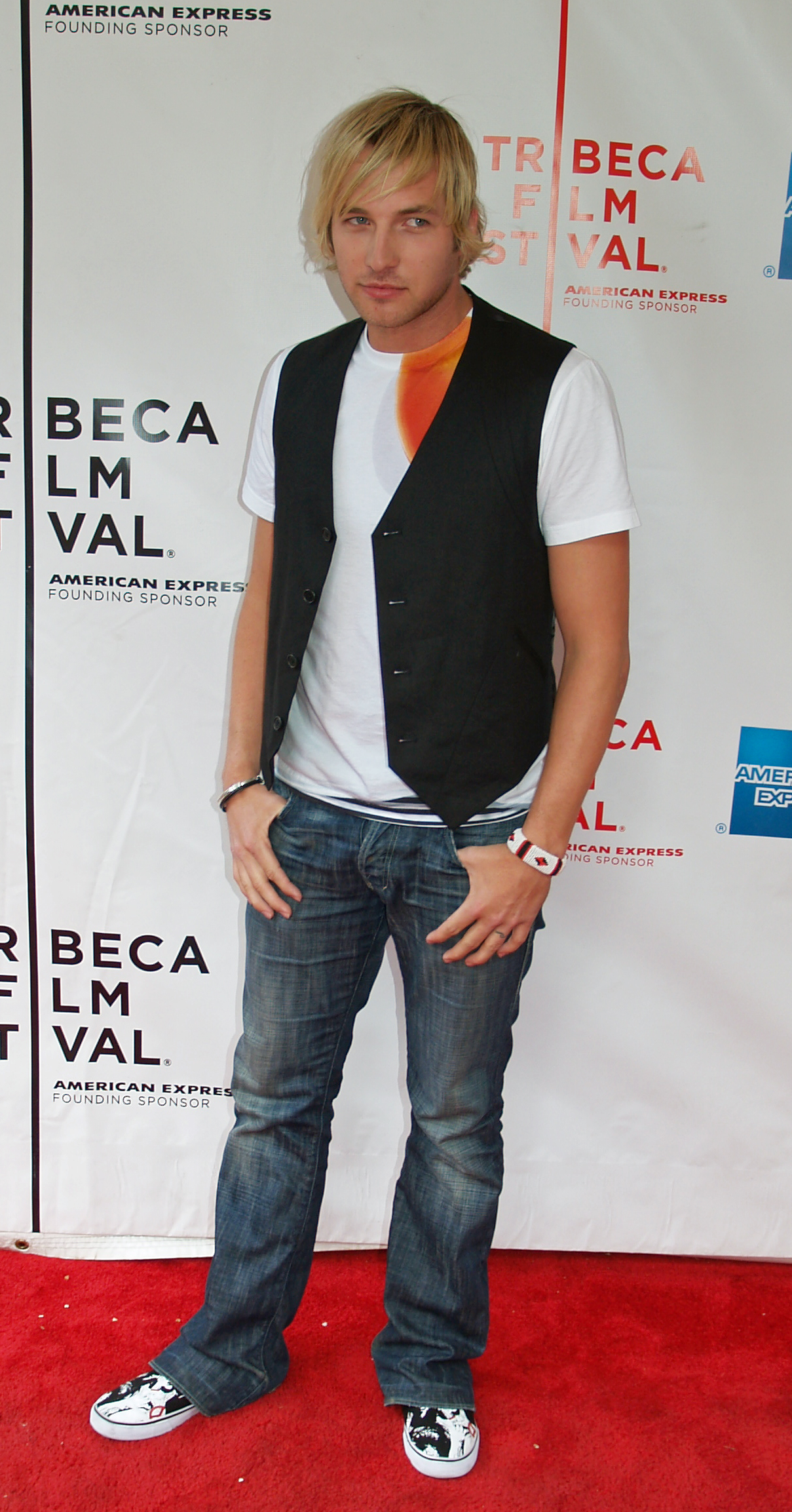
Hansen at the Tribeca Film Festival in April 2007

Film
Year	Title	Role	Notes
2005	Death by Engagement	Michael Micelli	
2006	The Cutting Edge: Going for the Gold	Scottie	
2007	Palo Alto	Anthony	
2008	Sherman's Way	Kevin	
2008	Superhero Movie	Lance Landers	
2009	House Broken	Elliot Cathkart	
2009	Friday the 13th	Nolan	
2010	BoyBand	Tommy	
2010	Brother's Justice	Lance Jeung	
2011	Bad Actress	Russell Pillage	
2011	Hipster Tea Party		Short film
2012	Last Call	Phil	
2012	Hit and Run	Allen	
2013	G.I. Joe: Retaliation	Grunt	
2014	Veronica Mars	Dick Casablancas	
2014	Let's Get Digital	Matt	Short film
2014	Friended to Death	Michael Harris	
2014	Mr. Maple Leaf	Jason	Short film
2015	Jem and the Holograms	Stephen the Guard	
2016	Central Intelligence	Steve	
2016	XOXO	DJ Avilo	
2016	Bad Santa 2	Regent Hastings	
2017	CHiPs	Brian Grieves	
2017	Literally, Right Before Aaron	Aaron	AKA The Wedding Guest
2017	Unicorn Store	Brock	
2018	Dog Days	Peter	
2019	The Turkey Bowl	Patrick Hodges	AKA Romantic Reunion
2020	Like a Boss	Greg	
2020	Fantasy Island	JD Weaver	
2020	Friendsgiving	Gunnar	
2021	Good on Paper	Dennis Kelly	
2022	Who Invited Them	Adam	
2023	The Donor Party	Armin	
2023	The Christmas Classic	Randy Collins	
2025	The Long Shot	Ray Mueller	

Television
Year	Title	Role	Notes
2001	The Geena Davis Show	Larry	Episode: "Hot Potato"
2001	Ally McBeal	Student MC	Episode: "The Wedding"
2001	Motocrossed	Entrant #1	Television film
2002	Power Rangers Wild Force	Pilot #3	Episode: "The End of the Power Rangers: Part 2"
2003	Grounded for Life	Matt	Episode: "Just Like a Woman"
2003	Hunter	Ron	Episode: "To Protect and Serve"
2004	Like Family	Dell	Episodes: "Who's Your Daddy?" and "Sex Ed"
2004	Las Vegas	Jared	Episode: "The Strange Life of Bob"
2004	Las Vegas	Brad	Uncredited; episode: "The Family Jewels"
2004–2007; 2019	Veronica Mars	Dick Casablancas	Recurring (seasons 1, 4); main cast (seasons 2–3), 55 episodes
2005–2006	That's So Raven	JJJ	Episodes: "Boyz 'N Commotion" and "Be Prepared"
2009	Gossip Girl	Shep	Episode: "Valley Girls"
2009–2010; 2023	Party Down	Kyle Bradway	Main cast; 26 episodes
2011	Friends with Benefits	Ben Harrison	Main cast; 13 episodes
2011	Childrens Hospital	Kyle Bradway	Episode: "Party Down"
2011	Lovelives	Tim	Television film
2012	Happy Endings	Jeff Niebert	Episode: "Makin' Changes!"
2012	Key & Peele	A Tribe Called Quest Shirt Guy	Episode: "Flash Mob"
2012	Best Friends Forever	Keith Kazakian	Episode: "Single and Lovin' It"
2012	Royal Pains	Brady Wilkerson	Episode: "Fools Russian"
2012	Before We Made It		Television film
2012	Wedding Band	Cooper	Episodes: "Don't Forget About Me" and "I Don't Wanna Grow Up"
2012	El Jefe	Josh Turkus	Television film
2012–2013	The League	Ben	Episodes: "The Freeze Out" and "Baby Geoffrey Jesus"
2012–2013; 2015; 2017	2 Broke Girls	Andy	Recurring (season 2); guest (season 5–6); 12 episodes
2013	Parenthood	Luke	Episode: "Keep on Rowing"
2014	House of Lies	Johnno	Episode: "Boom"
2014	Bad Teacher	Joel Kotsky	Main cast; 13 episodes
2014–2015	Bad Judge	Gary Boyd	Main cast; 13 episodes
2015	Newsreaders	Reese Ballard	Episode: "A Billionaire Goes to Hell; Sitcom Family"
2015	Resident Advisors	Doug Weiner	Main cast; mini-series, 7 episodes
2015	iZombie	Carson McComb	Episode: "Flight of the Living Dead"
2015	Marry Me	Lee	Episode: "Wake Me"
2015	Scheer-RL	Nick Lachey	Episode: "98 Degrees"
2015	Semi-Charmed Life	Grover Foster	Television film
2016	Angie Tribeca	Wilson Phillips	Episode: "The One with the Bomb"
2016	Grandfathered	Chason	Episode: "Tableside Guacamole"
2016; 2020	American Dad!	Chad (voice)	Episode: "The Enlightenment of Ragi-Baba"
2016; 2020	American Dad!	Maxon (voice)	Episode: "Yule. Tide. Repeat."
2017	Portlandia	Dax	Episode: "Carrie Dates a Hunk"
2017	Santa Clarita Diet	Bob Jonas	Episode: "Attention to Detail"
2017	The Mindy Project	Dr. Michael Lancaster	Episode: "Mindy Lahiri Is a White Man"
2017	Pillow Talk	Nicky	Episode: "Dirt Diamond"
2017	American Housewife	Zach	Episode: "The Couple"
2017–2019	Teachers	Brent	Guest (season 2), recurring (season 3), 4 episodes
2018	Me, Myself & I	Mid-Life Justin	Episode: "Home Alone"
2018	Fresh Off the Boat	Mr. Grant	Episode: "Sub Standard"
2019	Adam & Eve	Adam	Television film
2020	Bless This Mess	Matt	Episode: "The Table"
2021–2022	A Million Little Things	Camden Lamoureux	8 episodes
2023	Rick and Morty		Episode: "Rickfending Your Mort"
2023	Three Women	Patrick Long	Episode: "Gia"
2024–2025	Night Court	Jake	8 episodes
2024	Nobody Wants This	Kyle	Episode: "Either Aura"

Web
Year	Title	Role	Notes
2009	Rockville, CA	Chambers	13 episodes
2010	The Legion of Extraordinary Dancers	Brendan Broman	3 episodes
2012–2013	Burning Love	Cowboy waiter, Blaze	27 episodes
2014	HelLA	Ryan	Episode: "LA House Parties"
2014	Gentlemen Lobsters	Yannie Boi (voice)	Episode: "The Secret to Crushing at Titanfall: Wear Thom Browne Boxers"
2014	Play It Again, Dick	Himself / Dick Casablancas	Main cast; 8 episodes
2017–2019	Ryan Hansen Solves Crimes on Television	Himself	Main cast, 16 episodes

== Stage ==
- Alice (2008) – Trevor McKnight/White Night
