= Ash Brannon =

American writer, director, and animator

- Occupations: Writer, director, visual artist, animator, producer
- Years active: 1989–present

Ash Brannon is an American writer, director, visual artist, animator, and producer. He was a story artist and directing animator on Toy Story and co-director of Toy Story 2. He also directed and co-wrote the Sony Pictures Animation film Surf's Up. He also served as co-executive producer, story co-creator and writer on the Netflix animated series Arcane.

== Career ==
Brannon studied visual arts at Douglas Anderson School of the Arts in Jacksonville, Florida and went on to attend CalArts in its Character Animation program. He was accepted as a summer trainee at Walt Disney Animation Studios where he worked as an animation inbetweener on Disney's 1989 film The Little Mermaid. From 1990 to 1992, Brannon worked at Warner Bros. Animation as a story artist and animator for such projects as Nike's Hare Jordan Super Bowl ad in 1992.

In 1993 Brannon joined Pixar Animation Studios as a story artist on the studio's first two animated feature films Toy Story and A Bug's Life, as well as animation director on the former, before moving on to direct and help develop the storyline for Toy Story 2. Initially planned as a direct-to-video feature, the film was expanded in scope to become a theatrical feature. Brannon won an Annie Award for Outstanding Individual Achievement for Directing in an Animated Feature Production and Outstanding Individual Achievement for Writing in an Animated Feature Production. He was nominated for an Oscar in 2007 on Surf's Up.

Brannon joined Riot Games in 2016 to help craft the storyline for its animated series Arcane. Additionally he served as a co-executive producer and writer on Season One. Brannon, along with the show's creative team, won an Emmy for Outstanding Animated Program.

Most recently Brannon co-created the NFT animated series Stoner Cats. The six-episode series centers on an elderly woman suffering from Alzheimer's disease, and her five sentient housecats who must take care of her as she declines. The series was produced with partners Mila Kunis and Lisa Sterbakov of Orchard Farm Productions, and features a voice cast including Mila Kunis, Ashton Kutcher, Jane Fonda, Seth MacFarlane, and Chris Rock.

== Filmography ==
=== Films ===
Year	Film	Director	Writer	Animator	Story Artist	Other	Voice Role	Notes
1989	The Little Mermaid	No	No	No	No	Yes		Animation Trainee
1990	The Rescuers Down Under	No	No	No	No	Yes		Special Thanks
1995	Toy Story	No	No	Directing	Yes	No		
1998	A Bug's Life	No	No	No	Yes	No		
1999	Toy Story 2	Co-Director	Story	Yes	No	Yes		New Character Designs
2006	Over the Hedge	No	No	No	Additional	No		
2006	Open Season	No	No	No	No	Yes		Special Thanks
2007	Surf's Up	Yes	Yes	No	No	Yes	Filmmaker #1	
2016	Rock Dog	Yes	Yes	No	Yes	Yes	Ian	
2022	Hotel Transylvania: Transformania	No	No	No	Yes	No		
2024	10 Lives	No	Story	No	No	No		

=== Television ===
Year	Film	Director	Writer	Storyboard artist	Notes
1993	2 Stupid Dogs	No	No	Yes	Episode: "Red"
2021–23	Stoner Cats	Yes	Yes	No	7 episodes
2021	Arcane	No	Yes	No	9 episodes; Netflix series

=== Video games ===
Year	Title	Notes
1995	Toy Story: The Video Game	Pixar: Animator
1996	Toy Story: Animated Storybook	Disco Godfather (as "Ashley Brannon")
1999	Toy Story 2: Buzz Lightyear to the Rescue	Special Thanks
1999	Toy Story 2 Activity Center	Special Thanks

== Accolades ==
Award	Date of ceremony	Category	Film	Result	Ref(s)
Academy Awards	February 24, 2008	Best Animated Feature	Surf's Up	Nominated	
Annie Awards	November 11, 2000	Outstanding Individual Achievement for Directing in an Animated Feature Production	Toy Story 2	Won	
Annie Awards	November 11, 2000	Outstanding Individual Achievement for Writing in an Animated Feature Production	Toy Story 2	Won	
Annie Awards	February 8, 2008	Best Animated Feature	Surf's Up	Nominated	
Annie Awards	February 8, 2008	Outstanding Achievement for Directing in an Animated Feature Production	Surf's Up	Nominated	
Annie Awards	February 8, 2008	Outstanding Achievement for Writing in an Animated Feature Production	Surf's Up	Nominated	
Broadcast Film Critics Association Awards	January 24, 2000	Best Animated Film	Toy Story 2	Won	
Golden Rooster Awards	September 16, 2017	Best Animated Feature	Rock Dog	Nominated	
Hugo Awards	September 1–5, 2022	Best Dramatic Presentation, Short Form	Arcane (for "The Monster You Created")	Nominated	
My Nick Awards	September 4, 2008	Movie of the Year	Surf's Up	Won	
Primetime Creative Arts Emmy Awards	September 3–4, 2022	Outstanding Animated Program	Arcane (for "When These Walls Come Tumbling Down")	Won	
Saturn Awards	June 24, 2008	Best Animated Feature	Surf's Up	Nominated	
Shanghai International Film Festival	June 16, 2016	Best Animated Feature Film	Rock Dog	Nominated	
