= Boy band (disambiguation) =

A boy band is a vocal group consisting of young male singers.

Boy band, Boyband, or BoyBand may also refer to:

- Boyband (band), a New Zealand musical group
- Boy (duo), a Swiss–German pop duo
- BoybandPH, a Philippines band
- Boyband, Israeli band
- "Boyband" (5 Seconds of Summer song), 2025 song
- BoyBand (film), 2010 film
- Boy Band (TV series), a reality singing competition

== See also ==
- Boy (disambiguation)
