= Fantasy Island (film) =

2020 horror film directed by Jeff Wadlow

- Theatrical release poster
- Directed by: Jeff Wadlow
- Written by: Jeff Wadlow; Chris Roach; Jillian Jacobs
- Based on: Fantasy Island by Gene Levitt
- Produced by: Jason Blum; Marc Toberoff; Jeff Wadlow
- Starring: Michael Peña; Maggie Q; Lucy Hale; Austin Stowell; Jimmy O. Yang; Ryan Hansen; Portia Doubleday; Michael Rooker
- Cinematography: Toby Oliver
- Edited by: Sean Albertson
- Music by: Bear McCreary
- Production companies: Columbia Pictures; Blumhouse Productions; Tower of Babble
- Distributed by: Sony Pictures Releasing
- Release date: February 14, 2020
- Running time: 109 minutes
- Country: United States
- Language: English
- Budget: $7 million
- Box office: $49 million

Fantasy Island, also known as Blumhouse's Fantasy Island, is a 2020 American supernatural horror film directed and co-written by Jeff Wadlow. Serving both as a horror reimagining and an indirect prequel to ABC's 1977 television series of the same name, it stars Michael Peña, Maggie Q, Lucy Hale, Austin Stowell, Jimmy O. Yang, Ryan Hansen, Portia Doubleday, and Michael Rooker and follows a group of people who, while visiting the eponymous island, discover that their dream-like fantasies brought to life begin to turn into horrific living nightmares and they must try to survive.

Fantasy Island was released theatrically in the United States on February 14, 2020, by Sony Pictures Releasing, and was largely panned by critics, but was a financial success, grossing $49 million worldwide against its $7 million production budget.

== Plot ==
Five people — businesswoman Gwen Olsen, former police officer Patrick Sullivan, stepbrothers J. D. and Brax Weaver, and teenager Melanie Cole — arrive at Fantasy Island, a tropical resort where fantasies apparently come true. Upon arrival, island proprietor Mr. Roarke guides them to their fantasies: Patrick is enlisted in a war in honor of his late father; Melanie takes revenge on her childhood bully Sloane Maddison; the Weavers become honored guests at a mansion rave; and Gwen accepts her ex-boyfriend Allen Chambers' marriage proposal, which she rejected many years ago.

Melanie eventually learns that Sloane was kidnapped and brought to Fantasy Island against her will. She saves her from a masked surgeon and both run away. Meanwhile, Patrick is captured by a military platoon and taken to their commander, Lieutenant Sullivan, whom Patrick recognizes as his father. As night falls, the surgeon attacks Melanie and Sloane again before Damon, a private investigator, kills him. Damon reveals that Roarke offered him to see his deceased daughter, but the fantasy turned into a nightmare that trapped him on the island. He also explains that the fantasies are created by spring water under a glowing rock in a cave. The trio collect some spring water and head back to the resort for help. The next morning, Gwen wakes up to find she has a daughter with Allen and becomes dissatisfied.

When Roarke explains that the fantasies must be fulfilled so that his own fantasy of being with his deceased wife can continue, Gwen convinces him to give her the fantasy she really wanted: to save her neighbor Nick Taylor, who died in a fire. Unknown to the guests, Fantasy Island begins to turn the fantasies into nightmares as the Weavers are taken hostage by a drug cartel associated with the mansion's owner. Gwen is taken to the night she accidentally started the fire that killed Nick and finds out that the other guests, except Melanie, were also there and attempts to save Nick, but fails and is rescued by Roarke's assistant, Julia. Elsewhere, Sullivan's soldiers are summoned to rescue the Weavers; after being shot dead, the cartel reanimate as zombies who attack the soldiers. In the ensuing gunfight, J. D. is fatally shot and Sullivan sacrifices himself so Patrick and Brax can escape back to the resort.

The zombified surgeon ambushes Melanie and Sloane, but Damon sacrifices himself and leaps over a cliff with him. The remaining guests regroup at the resort, but are cornered by Roarke. He reveals that they are in a fantasy in which they are all killed. Realizing that everyone was involved in Nick's death—Melanie says that Nick asked her out that night and she turned him down, which is the reason he was at home—the guests assume it is Julia's fantasy as they believe that she is Nick's mother. The guests escape to the dock to be rescued by a plane sent by Damon's associates, but it is shot down. In response, the guests run to the cave to destroy the glowing rock with a grenade that Patrick is carrying. They enter the cave but quickly become separated and lost. As they wander the cave, they begin to be confronted by the different zombies that have come to torment them. Patrick has an encounter with his father who tries to drown him, Sloane comes face to face with her darker self, and Gwen faces her false daughter and an image of Nick, burned beyond recognition. Gwen apologizes for her actions and asks to be the only one punished for what happened calling out to Julia to free the others. Nick looks confused, asking, "Who is Julia?" Melanie suddenly stabs Patrick and takes Sloane hostage, revealing that it is her true fantasy. She orchestrated the guests' arrival to seek revenge on them for Nick's death, with whom she had a date and was convinced he was her soulmate. Julia is revealed to be Roarke's wife, brought back to life by the island's powers after dying of a terminal disease from which she was suffering when she met Roarke, and convinces him to help the guests before disappearing.

Sloane remembers the spring water she collected before and wishes Melanie to be forever with Nick. As a result, Nick's zombified corpse attacks Melanie and drags her into the water. Before drowning, Melanie activates the grenade, but Patrick sacrifices himself and falls on it to protect the others, paying tribute to how his father died years ago. As the fantasy concludes, Gwen, Sloane, and Brax wake up at the resort, where Roarke agrees to let them go. While the guests board a plane to leave the now-purified Fantasy Island, Brax wishes for J. D. to come back to life. Roarke explains that Brax must stay on the island for the fantasy to come true. After Gwen, Sloane, and a resurrected J. D. depart, Roarke asks Brax to become his new assistant. Remembering a nickname J. D. gave to him while they were at college, Brax chooses to rename himself "Tattoo". (Note: As depicted in Fantasy Island (1977).)

== Cast ==
- Michael Peña as Mr. Roarke
- Maggie Q as Gwen Olsen
- Lucy Hale as Melanie Cole
- Austin Stowell as Patrick Sullivan
- Jimmy O. Yang as Brax Weaver / Tattoo
- Ryan Hansen as J. D. Weaver
- Portia Doubleday as Sloane Maddison
- Michael Rooker as Damon
- Parisa Fitz-Henley as Julia Roarke
- Mike Vogel as Lieutenant Sullivan
- Evan Evagora as Nick Taylor
- Robbie Jones as Allen Chambers
- Kim Coates as Devil Face
- Ian Roberts as Dr. Torture
- Charlotte McKinney as Chastity

== Production ==
=== Development ===
In July 2018, it was announced that a horror film adaptation of the Fantasy Island television series was being developed at Blumhouse Productions and Sony Pictures. It was described as "a mix of Westworld and The Cabin in the Woods". Jeff Wadlow was set to direct as well as co-write the screenplay, and co-produce.

=== Casting ===
In October 2018, Michael Peña, Jimmy O. Yang, Dave Bautista, and Lucy Hale joined the cast. In November 2018, during an interview, Wadlow disclosed that Maggie Q, Portia Doubleday, and Ryan Hansen were added as well, though Bautista was no longer to appear in the film. Michael Rooker, Charlotte McKinney, Parisa Fitz-Henley, Austin Stowell, and Mike Vogel were cast in January 2019.

=== Filming locations ===
Most filming was in Viani Bay, Fiji. Minor scenes were filmed in New York and Mississippi.

== Music ==
On February 14, 2020, Madison Gate Records released the score soundtrack for the film composed by Bear McCreary. Jared Lee performed a track titled "Don’t Wish Your Life Away", which appeared in the film's end credits and was released as a single on January 31, 2020.

All tracks are written by McCreary.

No.	Title	Length
1.	"You Are One of My Guests"	1:37
2.	"Arrival"	3:45
3.	"Regret Is a Disease"	2:26
4.	"Your Fantasy Begins Now"	5:47
5.	"No Soldier"	5:45
6.	"The Life You Wanted"	2:51
7.	"Panic Room"	2:30
8.	"Dog Tags"	3:26
9.	"Brax Makes His Move"	2:44
10.	"You Deserve It"	2:04
11.	"The Heart of the Island"	4:38
12.	"Fighting"	4:28
13.	"A Devil, a Pig and a Clown"	6:36
14.	"Not My Fantasy"	2:58
15.	"The Island’s Secret"	8:49
16.	"In the Cave"	4:24
17.	"Hate in My Heart"	3:05
18.	"Every Guest Gets a Fantasy"	6:01
19.	"What Happens Now"	2:40
Total length:		76:34

== Release ==
Fantasy Island was released on February 14, 2020. It originally was scheduled to open on February 28, 2020, before being moved up, with another Blumhouse production, The Invisible Man, being set for its original date.

=== Home media ===
Fantasy Island was released on digital on April 14, 2020, and on Blu-ray and DVD on May 12, 2020.

== Reception ==
=== Box office ===
Fantasy Island grossed $27.4 million in the United States and Canada, and $21.6 million in other territories, for a worldwide total of $49 million, against a production budget of $7 million.

In the United States and Canada, the film was released alongside Sonic the Hedgehog, The Photograph and Downhill, and was projected to gross $13–20 million from 2,770 theaters in its opening weekend. It made $5.7 million on its first day, and went on to debut to $12.6 million for its first three days, and a total $14 million over four, finishing third at the box office.

=== Critical response ===
On Rotten Tomatoes, the film had an approval rating of 9% based on 114 critics, with an average rating of 3.4/10. The site's critics consensus read: "Fantasy Island tries to show audiences the dark side of wish fulfillment, but mainly serves as a cautionary tale about the dangers of exhuming long-dead franchises." On Metacritic, the film had a score of 22 out of 100 based on 29 critic reviews, indicating "generally unfavorable" reviews. Audiences polled by CinemaScore gave the film an average grade of "C−" on an A+ to F scale.

Richard Roeper of the Chicago Sun-Times called the film "inane" and "contrived," and wrote that "it feels like someone planted about a half-dozen different scripts all over this Fantasy Island." Peter Travers of Rolling Stone gave the film zero out of five stars, writing, "If crimes against cinema merited prosecution, Blumhouse's Fantasy Island would go directly to death row...The only genuine, blood-curdling scream incited by this stupefyingly dull time- and money-waster comes at the end, when the notion dawns that [the film] is meant to spawn sequels. Stop it now, before it kills again." Peter Sobczynski of RogerEbert.com wrote that the film "contains less raw terror in its entirety than Sonic the Hedgehog during any five minutes of its running time," calling it "utterly boring" and "no sane person's fantasy of a half-decent movie." Benjamin Lee of The Guardian gave the film 2/5 stars, describing it as "an odd attempt at genre-surfing that ends up well out of its depth".

== Accolades ==
Year	Award	Category	Recipient(s)	Result
2021	Golden Raspberry Awards	Worst Picture	Jason Blum, Marc Toberoff and Jeff Wadlow	Nominated
2021	Golden Raspberry Awards	Worst Supporting Actress	Lucy Hale	Nominated
2021	Golden Raspberry Awards	Worst Supporting Actress	Maggie Q	Nominated
2021	Golden Raspberry Awards	Worst Screenplay	Jeff Wadlow & Chris Roach & Jillian Jacobs; Based on the television series created by Gene Levitt	Nominated
2021	Golden Raspberry Awards	Worst Prequel, Remake, Rip-off or Sequel	Fantasy Island	Nominated
