= I'm Through with White Girls =

- Directed by: Jennifer Sharp
- Written by: Courtney Lilly
- Produced by: Chris Adams; Lia Johnson; Camilla Rantsen
- Starring: Anthony Montgomery; Ryan Alosio; Lia Johnson
- Cinematography: Jacob Pinger
- Edited by: Tom Huang; Jennifer Sharp
- Distributed by: Image Entertainment
- Release date: February 2007 (Los Angeles Pan African Film Festival)
- Country: United States
- Language: English

I'm Through with White Girls (The Inevitable Undoing of Jay Brooks) is a 2007 independent romantic comedy film starring Anthony Montgomery and directed by Jennifer Sharp. The film was shot in Los Angeles over the course of twenty-four days.

== Plot ==
Jay Brooks (Montgomery), a black man, vows to give up dating white women in favor of dating black women, only to fall in love with a biracial woman.

== Cast ==
- Anthony Montgomery as Jay Brooks
- Ryan Alosio as Matt McKenzie
- Lia Johnson as Catherine Williamson
- Lisa Brenner as Molly
- Johnny Brown as Sam Moore
- Jeff Wadlow as Billy
- Alaina Reed Hall as Jerri Hall
- Lamman Rucker as Drake Moore
- Kellee Stewart as J.C. Evans
- Lynn Chen as Candace

== Awards ==
Year	Award	Category	Recipient
2007	American Black Film Festival	Best Film	Jennifer Sharp
2007	Bahamas International Film Festival	Emerging Artist	Jennifer Sharp
2007	Hollywood Black Film Festival	Best Narrative Feature Film	Jennifer Sharp
