= CHiPs (film) =

2017 film by Dax Shepard

- Theatrical release poster
- Directed by: Dax Shepard
- Written by: Dax Shepard
- Based on: CHiPs by Rick Rosner
- Produced by: Andrew Panay; Ravi Mehta
- Starring: Dax Shepard; Michael Peña; Rosa Salazar; Adam Brody; Vincent D'Onofrio
- Cinematography: Mitchell Amundsen
- Edited by: Dan Lebental
- Music by: Fil Eisler
- Production company: Primate Pictures
- Distributed by: Warner Bros. Pictures
- Release dates: March 20, 2017 (TCL Chinese Theatre); March 24, 2017 (United States)
- Running time: 101 minutes
- Country: United States
- Language: English
- Budget: $25 million
- Box office: $26.8 million

CHiPs is a 2017 American buddy cop action comedy film written and directed by Dax Shepard, based on the 1977–1983 television series of the same name created by Rick Rosner. The film stars Shepard as Officer Jon Baker and Michael Peña as Frank "Ponch" Poncherello, with Rosa Salazar, Adam Brody and Vincent D'Onofrio in supporting roles.

Principal photography began on 21 October 2015, in Los Angeles. The film premiered in the TCL Chinese Theatre in Hollywood, Los Angeles on March 20, 2017, and was theatrically released on March 24, by Warner Bros. Pictures. It grossed $26 million against a budget of $25 million, and received negative reviews from critics for its plot and direction.

Unlike the original series, the movie was produced without the cooperation of the California Highway Patrol (CHP) and without a license to use CHP logos.

== Plot ==
In Miami, FBI Agent Castillo takes down a crew of bank robbers. At the same time, former motocross racer Jon Baker enrolls in the California Highway Patrol Academy. Despite his low aptitude scores, Sgt. Gail notes that he can ride a motorcycle better than the majority of cadets and grants him a probationary graduation.

On a California highway, a crew of bikers attacks an armored van. One member, "LT", accuses the guard and his CHP closet boyfriend TJ of stealing from him. As punishment, LT informs TJ over the police frequency that he must choose who lives; he or his boyfriend. TJ ultimately kills himself.

In Miami, Castillo is informed that the CHP have requested the FBI's help in the armored van heist, believing that a corrupt police ring is involved. Given the alias Francis Llewellyn "Ponch" Poncherello, he is partnered with Baker before visiting TJ's widow at home. Baker notes that there is not a single item a helicopter pilot would have in the house and identifies the bikes used in the heist as the Ducati Hypermotard 939.

The bike gang makes another attempt on an armored van. The crew evade Ponch and Baker on the faster Ducatis after a lengthy chase through Elysian Park. LT, wary of Ponch's extensive investigations into the heists, finds out from his FBI contacts that he is undercover.

Ponch obtains a lead on an apartment TJ tenanted, concluding that TJ must have been corrupt as it would not have been affordable on his salary. Ponch and Baker re-visit TJ's home. Though getting involved in a fight with Parish, Ponch recognizes that he is not in on the corrupt circle, after he suggests that "LT" could stand for Lieutenant. They later arrive on the profile of Lieutenant Ray Kurtz but have no evidence to pin him to the heists.

The FBI pick up on a lead to a drug house in Venice, prompting Ponch and Baker to respond. During a lengthy pursuit with one of the crew members, Officer Brian Grieves secretly informs LT that the suspect involved is his son. While crossing a bridge, the suspect is decapitated by a recovery vehicle's extended industrial wire. LT arrives and crashes into Baker, who was in pursuit. Parish arrives in his police helicopter and airlifts an unconscious Baker to the hospital.

Peterson fires Ponch for disobeying his orders to stay far from the FBI's lead. Baker also discovers that his ex-wife Karen, who he had been living with, has sold the house while he was in the hospital without telling him. At Ponch's, Baker identifies the decapitated biker as former motocross racer Raymond Reed Kurtz Jr., who is Ray's son, confirming their suspicions.

Ray kidnaps Karen, holding her hostage at his safe house. Ponch and Baker rescue her as Officer Ava Perez arrives with back up but are attacked by Ray's associates. Ray shoots off three of Ponch's fingers, leaving him unable to return fire, so he must rely on Baker's poor aim to retaliate.

Altering his aim to compensate, Baker accidentally detonates an explosive device that incapacitates Ray and his remaining guards, who Perez and the other officers arrest. Ray comes to but is reinforced by Officer Lindsey Taylor and then holds Baker at gunpoint. Ponch intervenes moments before Ray fires a shot into Baker's arm that ricochets off of a titanium implant and into Ray's head, killing him.

Baker is loaded onto an ambulance to be treated for his injuries. Karen offers to join him in hospital, but he realizes how little she cares for him and declines her offer. Ponch is given morphine by a paramedic ('Ponch' from the original series, aka Erik Estrada).

A final scene shows Ponch receiving a call from Peterson, who offers him his job back at the FBI. He refuses, preferring to stay in the CHP.

== Cast ==
- Michael Peña as FBI Agent Castillo/California Highway Patrol Officer Francis Llewellyn "Ponch" Poncherello.
- Dax Shepard as California Highway Patrol Officer Jonathan "Jon" Baker.
- Vincent D'Onofrio as California Highway Patrol Lieutenant Raymond Kurtz.
- Rosa Salazar as California Highway Patrol Officer Ava Perez.
- Jessica McNamee as California Highway Patrol Officer Lindsey Taylor.
- Adam Brody as Special Agent Clay Allen.
- Ryan Hansen as California Highway Patrol Officer Brian Grieves.
- Isiah Whitlock Jr. as Special Agent Peterson.
- Richard T. Jones as Parish
- Kristen Bell as Karen Baker, Jon's estranged wife.
- Jane Kaczmarek as California Highway Patrol Captain Jane Lindel.
- Jess Rowland as California Highway Patrol Officer Rathbun
- Justin Chatwin as Raymond Reed Kurtz Jr.
- Vida Guerra as Ann
- David Koechner as Pat
- Ed Begley Jr. as Wasp Driver
- Megalyn Echikunwoke as Patricia Eerly
- Merrin Dungey as Joy Jackson
- Ben Falcone as Bicycle Cop
- Mae Whitman as Beebee
- Amanda Perez as Sheryl/Organizer
- Carly Hatter as Agent Angela Roth
- Andrew Howard as Arnaud
- Jackie Tohn as Amy Stephenson
- Maya Rudolph (uncredited) as Sergeant Gail Hernandez
- Josh Duhamel (uncredited) as Rick
- Adam Rodriguez (uncredited) as Shamus
- Erik Estrada (uncredited) as Paramedic

== Production ==
=== Development ===
In 2005, a theatrical release motion picture version of the show was announced, starring Wilmer Valderrama as Ponch, though as of 2013 this production was still "stalled". Erik Estrada and Larry Wilcox were rumored to make cameo appearances, although only Estrada appeared. In a 2002 episode of MADtv, Valderrama and fellow That '70s Show cast member Danny Masterson were featured in two parodies of CHiPs, which featured the two actors as Ponch and Baker respectively. Mila Kunis also appeared in the second sketch. In a 2002 episode of That '70s Show, Valderrama's character, Fez, was seen in the "most likely" section of the yearbook as "most likely to appear as Ponch in a musical version of CHiPs".

The project began as a personal film that Dax Shepard wanted to do: a motor sports comedy starring him and Michael Peña, and a tribute to the CHiPs television series. In an interview with Vulture, Shepard said:

...I’m always looking for something that will hold both comedy and motor sports. I’m looking for anything that I think I can combine those two things and that someone will make... I couldn’t have gone into any studio and said, “The movie’s called, uh, Eat My Dust” — well, that’s actually a title — “Burn Rubber, and it’s me and Michael Peña, and we’re on motorcycles.” They’d go, “No thank you.” It had to have a safety net, and the safety net I found was CHiPs, which as a kid I saw it, I was 2 when it came on originally and I think I was 8 when it went off the air... I lived in Detroit and it was cold and cloudy every day, and you’d turn this show on and for an hour you were in California, and it was beaches and palm trees and this weird pair on motorcycles, and as a kid, I was in. I didn’t follow any of the plotlines, and I didn’t know what the show was about, but it just had California and motorcycles. I thought, this could hold a Bad Boys version of the movie, because your heroes have motorcycles, so it’s got an inherent coolness if we just keep pushing in that direction.

On September 2, 2014, Warner Bros. Entertainment (current owners of the CHiPs television show through its 1996 acquisition of Turner Entertainment Co.) announced a film adaptation of the 1977–1983 TV series CHiPs created by Rick Rosner, which Andrew Panay would be producing along with Shepard. Shepard also wrote, directed and starred in the film. It was announced that Panay would produce the film through his Panay Films along with Ravi Mehta. In August 2015, the film was selected by the California Film Commission to receive $5.1 million in tax credits.

Steven Mnuchin was the executive producer of the film.

=== Filming ===
Principal photography on the film began on October 21, 2015, in Los Angeles, California, using many of the same sections of Southern California freeways used for the original television series, notably Interstate 210 in La Crescenta, California.

=== Casting ===
In September 2014, Warner Bros. announced that Shepard would write, direct, and star in the film as Officer Jon Baker, and that Michael Peña would portray Frank "Ponch" Poncherello. In May 2015, Vincent D'Onofrio was announced to be playing a former cop turned car thief and gang-leader. In September, Adam Brody joined the film to play an officer, while Rosa Salazar and Shepard's wife Kristen Bell also signed on to star. A few weeks later, Jessica McNamee signed on to play Lindsey Taylor, a tough and beautiful young California Highway Patrol officer. In November, Jane Kaczmarek joined the film to play the police captain. In March 2016, it was announced that Ryan Hansen would join the film.

== Release ==
CHiPs was originally scheduled to be released on August 11, 2017, but it was pushed up to March 24, 2017, by Warner Bros. Pictures.

CHiPs was released digitally on June 13, 2017. Two weeks later on June 27, 2017, Warner Home Video released the film on Blu-ray and DVD.

== Reception ==
=== Box office ===
CHiPs grossed $18.6 million in the United States and Canada and $8.2 million in other territories for a worldwide gross of $26.8 million, against a production budget of $25 million.

In the United States and Canada, CHiPs opened alongside Life, Power Rangers and Wilson, and was projected to gross around $10 million from 2,464 theaters in its opening weekend. The film made $500,000 from Thursday night previews at 2,400 theaters. It went on to debut to $7.6 million, finishing 7th at the box office. In its second weekend the film grossed $4 million (a drop of 48.7%), finishing 9th at the box office.

=== Critical response ===
On review aggregator website Rotten Tomatoes, the film has an approval rating of 20% based on 111 reviews and an average rating of 3.7/10. The site's critical consensus reads, "CHiPs abandons the endearing innocence of its source material, using the titular cop show's premise as a setup for aggressively lowbrow gags that prove only mildly arresting at best." On Metacritic, the film has a weighted average score of 28 out of 100 based on 26 critics, indicating "generally unfavorable" reviews. Audiences polled by CinemaScore gave the film an average grade of "B–" on an A+ to F scale, while PostTrak reported filmgoers gave a 74% overall positive score and just 50% gave it a "definite recommend".

Variety's Owen Gleiberman called the film lazy and clichéd, saying: "The film's model is—or should have been—the movie version of 21 Jump Street and its sequel, but the co-directors of those bumptious nihilistic undercover burlesques, Phil Lord and Christopher Miller, knew how to turn comedy into suspense and thrills into media-mad absurdity. Shepard just sprinkles overstated banter onto a generic plot and bits of pedal-to-the-metal action, as if he was serving the action-comedy gods by sticking the usual ingredients in a blender and pushing 'purée.'"

The original show's star, Larry Wilcox, posted on Twitter saying, "Way to go Warner Bros – just ruined the Brand of CHIPS and of the Calif Highway Patrol. Great choice!"

=== Golden Raspberry ===
The film was awarded the Barry L. Bumstead Award at the 38th Golden Raspberry Awards, meaning the film would have likely been nominated in their "Worst Film" category had the recipient's theatrical run met their eligibility criteria.
