= Hit and Run (2012 film) =

- Theatrical release poster
- Directed by: David Palmer; Dax Shepard
- Written by: Dax Shepard
- Produced by: Andrew Panay; Nate Tuck; Kim Waltrip; Jim Casey; Dax Shepard
- Starring: Dax Shepard; Kristen Bell; Bradley Cooper; Tom Arnold; Kristin Chenoweth; Michael Rosenbaum; Joy Bryant; Ryan Hansen; Beau Bridges
- Cinematography: Bradley Stonesifer
- Edited by: Keith Croket; Dax Shepard
- Music by: Robert Mervak; Julian Wass
- Production companies: Exclusive Media; Panay Films; Primate Pictures; Kim and Jim Productions
- Distributed by: Open Road Films
- Release date: August 22, 2012
- Running time: 100 minutes
- Country: United States
- Language: English
- Budget: $2 million
- Box office: $16.8 million

Hit and Run is a 2012 American action comedy film written by Dax Shepard, with David Palmer and Shepard co-directing (their second collaboration after Brother's Justice in 2010). The film stars Shepard and Kristen Bell, with Kristin Chenoweth, Tom Arnold, and Bradley Cooper, and follows a man who has been placed in Federal Witness Protection going on the run with his girlfriend to escape a mobster. It was released on August 22, 2012, received mixed reviews from critics, and grossed $16 million.

== Plot ==
Charlie Bronson is enrolled in Witness Protection, living in Milton, California, under the supervision of incompetent U.S. Marshal Randy Anderson. Charlie's girlfriend Annie Bean is a professor with a doctorate in Non-Violent Conflict Resolution. Her supervisor Debby Kreeger promises to fire her if she does not make it to a job interview at UCLA.

Charlie, unable to return to Los Angeles since enrolling in Witness Protection, insists Annie take the interview without him. Instead, Annie returns to work to beg to keep her job, but Charlie picks her up in his souped-up, restored Lincoln Continental to take her to the interview.

Annie's ex-boyfriend Gil Rathbinn, believing Charlie is in Witness Protection as a murderous criminal, urges her not to go; undeterred, she leaves with Charlie. Gil's brother Terry, a police officer, finds that Charlie's vehicle is registered to "Yul Clint Perrkins" — Charlie's real name. Gil discovers Charlie is a former getaway driver who testified in an unsuccessful case against his fellow bank robbers. Gil messages one of the defendants, Alexander Dmitri, on Facebook, that he knows Yul Perrkins' location.

Randy pursues Charlie to L.A. Charlie and Annie confront Gil, who is following them, and Charlie tries to resolve the situation non-violently at her insistence. Unmoved, Gil reveals that he knows Charlie's real name and has Alex Dmitri as a "Facebook friend". Charlie and Annie flee, running Randy off the road as he arrives. Alex sees Gil's message and gathers his fellow bank robbers Neve and Allen to find him.

While Annie and Charlie stop for gas, the Continental's engine is admired by a redneck named Sanders. He follows them to a motel, and they discover in the morning that the engine has been stolen. Ambushed by Gil, Charlie knocks him out and realizes he was accompanied by Alex's crew. He grabs the VIN of a Chevrolet Corvette in the parking lot and duplicates a keyless entry using the tools of his former trade; he and Annie flee in the Corvette, with Gil, Alex's crew, and Randy in hot pursuit. The pair argue over his past, and he reveals that he was a getaway driver for 13 bank robberies and was engaged to Neve.

After escaping their pursuers, Annie confronts Charlie for lying to her and proceeds without him. Gil agrees to take her the rest of the way, but they are run off the road by Alex, who takes her hostage and calls Charlie, telling him to meet at a nearby diner. There, he demands money in exchange for Annie; they argue about Charlie's betrayal, cut short when Alex reveals that he was raped in prison and blames Charlie. Charlie agrees to take Alex to his stash of money hidden at his estranged father Clint's home; en route, he calls Randy, now in the company of Terry (who is attracted to him) and his partner Angela (Carly Hatter) with his father's address. The three pick up Gil along the way.

At Clint's, Charlie and his father reconcile as they dig up his bag of money. His father mentions his Class 1 Off-Road racing vehicle, and attacks Alex’s crew as Charlie and Annie escape in the racer, just as Gil, Randy, Terry and Angela arrive. Randy manages to shoot Alex and arrests the thieves. Two other Marshals take Alex's crew into custody, complimenting Randy and Terry's work.

Charlie and Annie reconcile and arrive in time for her interview; He offers to spend the rest of his life with her, and she accepts. Some months later, Randy and Terry, now in a relationship, take the Marshals' exam.

A stinger segment reveals Annie's interview with Professor Sandy Osterman. She interrupts him hotboxing his office and is surprised he is not a woman as Debby had described. Osterman reveals Debby is his sister, and Annie sympathizes with him, earning his approval and an immediate job offer, which she accepts.

== Cast ==
- Kristen Bell as Annie Bean
- Dax Shepard as Charlie Bronson/Yul Perrkins
- Tom Arnold as U.S. Marshal Randy Anderson
- Kristin Chenoweth as Debby Kreeger
- Michael Rosenbaum as Gil Rathbinn
- Jess Rowland as Terry Rathbinn
- Steve Agee as Dude #1
- Bradley Cooper as Alex Dimitri
- Joy Bryant as Neve Tatum
- David Koechner as Sanders
- Ryan Hansen as Allen
- Beau Bridges as Clint Perrkins
- Jason Bateman as U.S. Marshal Keith Yert
- Sean Hayes as Sandy Osterman

== Production ==
On December 21, 2011, Open Road Films picked up the U.S distribution rights. Open Road changed the name of the film from Outrun to Hit and Run.

One of the chase scenes was filmed at the former MCAS Tustin base in Tustin, California, with the distinctive blimp hangars prominently visible. The final scene was filmed in front of Oviatt Library, California State University, Northridge. The film was also filmed in Fillmore, California and Piru, California. To keep the production budget low, most of the cast did their own stunts and driving.

== Release ==
Distributed by Open Road, the film opened in theaters on August 22, 2012. The first official trailer was released on May 16, 2012.

== Reception ==
On review aggregator site Rotten Tomatoes, Hit and Run holds an approval rating of 49% based on 136 reviews, with an average rating of 5.3/10. The website's critical consensus reads, "Though Hit & Run has some surprisingly off-kilter filmmaking, the action doesn't add to much and the writing's a bit smug." Metacritic gives the film a weighted average score of 50 out of 100, based on 31 critics, indicating "mixed or average" reviews. Audiences polled by CinemaScore gave the film an average grade of "C+" on an A+ to F scale.

Roger Ebert gave it 3.5 of 4 stars, writing, "With its off-the-shelf title, I had worked up less than a white-hot enthusiasm to see "Hit & Run," but it's a lot more fun than the title suggests. How many chase comedies have you seen where the hero's sexy girlfriend has a doctorate in nonviolent conflict resolution? Her counseling would have been invaluable to the U.S. marshal (Tom Arnold) in an early scene where he attempts to shoot his own van." Film critic Richard Roeper gave the film an "F", calling it an unfunny comedy movie from start to finish.

== Soundtrack ==
Hit and Run (Original Motion Picture Soundtrack)

Film score
- Released: August 21, 2012
- Genre: Soundtrack
- Length: 44:52
- Label: Lakeshore Records

The film soundtrack was commercially released as the Hit and Run (Original Motion Picture Soundtrack) on August 21, 2012.

Hit and Run (Original Motion Picture Soundtrack)
No.	Title	Artist	Length
1.	"Fever"	Ishmael Jingo	6:41
2.	"You'll Never Find Another Love Like Me"	Glitter Ball	3:28
3.	"Pure Imagination"	Lou Rawls	3:41
4.	"Funky 16 Corners"	The Highlighters	5:18
5.	"Waltz of Hate"	Bob Mervak	2:48
6.	"Summer Madness"	Kool & the Gang	4:17
7.	"You Feel Like Home"	Bob & Iz	2:53
8.	"Let it Whip"	Dazz Band	4:45
9.	"Knockin' On Heaven's Door"	Bob Mervak	2:27
10.	"Over the Hill"	John Martyn	2:52
11.	"Last Train"	Allen Toussaint	2:59
12.	"Let My Love Open the Door"	Pete Townshend	2:43
Total length:			44:52

Songs not included within the soundtrack

- "Nothing's Gonna Change My Love for You" – performed by Glenn Medeiros
- "Sweet Emotion" - performed by Aerosmith
- "Voodoo Child (Slight Return)" - performed by The Jimi Hendrix Experience
