= Stoner Cats =

Canadian-American adult animated series

Stoner Cats is an adult animated series that stars Mila Kunis, Ashton Kutcher and Chris Rock as cats that use medical marijuana. The show also stars Jane Fonda, Seth MacFarlane, and Vitalik Buterin with guests Dax Shepard, Gary Vaynerchuk, and Michael Bublé. The producers were fined by the US Securities and Exchange Commission because they sold unregistered NFTs as a means towards a pass to view the show.

== Synopsis ==
The show follows five housecats, Fefe, Baxter, Dave, Reginald, and Hammy, who are owned by the elderly former Broadway singer Beatrice Stoner, who smokes prescription cannabis as treatment for her Alzheimer's. One day, she smokes an experimental strain and falls asleep, knocking the cannabis into the fireplace; the smoke gives the five housecats sentience and anthropomorphic abilities. After they secure more of the experimental marijuana and chemicals from the nearby Weekly Elderly Easement Dispensary (W.E.E.D.) facility to retain their sentience, they begin to receive cryptic messages through appliances, electronics, and the taxidermized Lord Catsington, warning them to protect their owner from her nephew Chad, who schemes to steal her estate for himself to resolve his gambling debts.

In the end, it's revealed the messages were communicated by the future Stoner Cats, operating out of the derelict W.E.E.D. facility. Most of them have significant disabilities, and the future Fefe reveals a plot to manipulate thousands of other alternate timelines.

== Cast ==
- Mila Kunis as Fefe Stoner, a black cat who is the sole female and the de facto leader of the Stoner Cats. She is the most devoted to protecting Beatrice and is often frustrated with the antics of her male housemates, reflected by her ears being almost always down. She is usually the first to identify and\or resolve problems, and fiercely hates Chad. Her future self has her right arm at the elbow replaced with a cybernetic arm.
- Ashton Kutcher as Baxter Stoner, a brown cat who is an internet-addicted conspiracy theorist. Because of his constant computer usage, he has a high aptitude for technology and is often the first to receive messages or instructions through the computer. He becomes incredibly skittish and paranoid after being physically sucked into an internet rabbit hole during a drug hallucination. His future self's right eye has been replaced with a green cybernetic eye.
- Seth MacFarlane as Davis "Dave" Stoner, an overweight orange tabby cat. He has a friendly and outgoing personality and is arguably the least intelligent of the group. In spite of his lazy "couch potato" personality, Dave is resourceful, sometimes breaking from the group to resolve problems himself; he was the one to secure the chemicals that helped give the cats certain powers. He is close friends with Hammy and is also acquainted with the raccoon Hash Panda. His future self has only a visor and Reginald's head in a jar.
  - MacFarlane also voices Reginald "Reggie" Stoner, who is Dave's alcoholic brother with a snobbish and apathetic personality. He does not like Dave or the others much, and usually reacts to situations with disinterested sarcasm, though he will sometimes help in aiding Beatrice. Despite his drinking habits, he is a competent chemist, experimenting on the chemicals Dave brought home, and will usually treat his housemates as guinea pigs. He also shows a fondness for music. His future self is simply his head in a jar of liquid, worn by Dave as a necklace.
- Chris Rock as Hamilton "Hammy" Stoner, a beige cat who is the smallest of the group. Due to his size, Hammy shows evidence of a Napoleon complex, having notable anger issues and often aggrandizing his size and abilities, and in a drug hallucination picturing himself as a large monster attacking a city. He has a sweet tooth and is close friends with Dave. His future self has cybernetic legs, making him much taller.
- Vitalik Buterin as Lord Catsington Stoner, a cat who passed in 1979 and has been taxidermized. As such, he does not actually speak or move, but will move his eyes and psychically communicate messages in hallucinations, at some points literally speaking to Fefe from beyond the grave. It is unclear if he was a vessel for the future Stoner Cats to communicate to their present-day counterparts.
- Jane Fonda as Beatrice Stoner, an elderly lady who owns the Stoner Cats. Beatrice is a former Broadway theatre singer who led an apparently significant lifestyle in her past, having a friendship with Michael Bublé, who dedicates a live song to her. Beatrice now lives alone and has Alzheimer's disease, for which she treats by smoking prescription cannabis. Beatrice plans to donate her estate to the Three Legged Cat Foundation, to the chagrin of her nephew Chad. She is also suggested to be an alcoholic, given the large stock of liquor in her house, and is often seen with a beverage.
- Dax Shepard as Chad Wilkins, Beatrice Stoner's nephew and the main antagonist. Chad puts on the facade of a rich and successful businessman, but is really in severe debt from gambling on chihuahua races, and plans to manipulate Beatrice to sign over power of attorney and steal her will to pay off his debts with her estate, whilst abandoning her in a seniors home. Despite passing himself off as Beatrice's "favorite nephew," he cares very little for her, being unavailable to assist her when she is in need and showing minuscule concern over her problems. He is killed in the final episode, breaking his neck in a fall, and is thrown into a trash bin by Reginald using a telekinetic chemical.
- Gary Vaynerchuk as Hash Panda, a raccoon who has also discovered the powers of W.E.E.D. chemicals after consuming some in their trash. He reluctantly helps Dave (who he calls "Garfield") break in and out of the W.E.E.D. facility, while carrying out his own heist.
- Michael Bublé as himself.
