= Anthony Montgomery =

American actor (born 1971)

- Montgomery at Dragon Con in 2026
- Born: Anthony Dwayne Montgomery; June 2, 1971 (age 55); Indianapolis, Indiana, U.S.
- Years active: 1995–present
- Spouse(s): Adrienne Montgomery (m. 2007; div. 20??)
- Children: 2
- Relatives: Wes Montgomery (grandfather)

Anthony Dwayne Montgomery (born June 2, 1971) is an American actor and graphic novelist. He is best known for his portrayal of Ensign Travis Mayweather on the UPN science fiction television series Star Trek: Enterprise. Montgomery played Andre Maddox on the ABC daytime soap opera General Hospital from 2015 to 2019. He is the grandson of jazz guitarist Wes Montgomery.

== Early life ==
Montgomery was born in Indianapolis, Indiana. He graduated from Ball State University with a degree in performance theater and drama. Montgomery did stand-up comedy briefly after graduation, before moving to California.

== Career ==
=== Film and television ===
Sometimes credited as "A.T. Montgomery", his first starring role was in the horror-comedy Leprechaun in the Hood (2000), for which he also contributed writing and vocals for several songs. He had a recurring role on the television series Popular before being cast as Ensign Travis Mayweather in Star Trek: Enterprise in 2001. In 2004, he returned to stand-up comedy.

Montgomery starred in the film I'm Through with White Girls in 2007. In January 2009, Montgomery appeared in an episode of the Fox series House. In 2013, he appeared briefly as a dud romantic-interest in the show Baby Daddy, playing a handsome but boring drycleaner the show's (young) grandmother was interested in. In 2013 he also produced and starred in the independent film Chariot, about seven amnesiac strangers who awake on an airliner mid-flight.

In 2015, Montgomery joined the cast of the ABC daytime soap General Hospital playing Dr. Andre Maddox.

=== Stage ===
In 2004, Montgomery returned to the stage in Los Angeles, producing the show Dutchman by LeRoi Jones. He has also performed in a number of stage productions. His other stage credits include productions of Working, Oliver, Othello, and Much Ado About Nothing. In the summer of 2005, Montgomery returned to Indiana to star in theatrical fundraisers for charity.

=== Music ===
Montgomery has produced one CD of his own music, What You Know About..., featuring four songs about Star Trek themes. In April 2007 Anthony Montgomery signed with the Germany-based AGR Television Records. His (Hip-Hop) debut-album, titled A.T., was released in November 2008. In the TV series Single Ladies that he had a recurring role in, a single he wrote and performed, entitled "Stimulation", was included for the music-heavy show's mood soundtrack for Episode 9. The single also featured rapper J. Naught-T.

=== Writing ===
In 2013, Montgomery created Miles Away, a hoped-to-be media franchise, about a teenager with special needs who battles aliens. A graphic novel was published in June 2013.

== Personal life ==
Anthony Montgomery and his wife Adrienne Montgomery were wed in August 2007. After marriage, they had a child together, and he had a child from a previous relationship. His grandfather was jazz musician Wes Montgomery. Montgomery is a martial arts student. He studied Hapkido and Koga Ryu Ninjutsu.

== Filmography ==
=== Film ===
Year	Title	Role	Notes
1998	Hard Rain	(Uncredited)	
1998	ESP: Extra Sexual Perception	Tony	Direct-to-video
2000	Leprechaun in the Hood	Postmaster P.	Direct-to-video; also, a writer and vocalist
2007	I'm Through with White Girls	Jay Brooks	
2008	An American in China	Sha	
2008	The Porter	Thomas Dodd (adult)	Short film
2009	Why Am I Doing This?	Lester	
2012	Directing Reality	Kevin	Short film
2013	Chariot	Cole	
2015	The Man in 3B	Avery	
2017	The Preacher's Son	Rev. Reynolds	
2017	DDX: Department of Disclosure	William Bennett	Short film
2019	#Truth (A Cold Hard Truth)	Patrick Winter	
2020	Long Lost Sister	Corey's Lawyer Friend	
2020	Unbelievable!!!!!	The Launchman	
2020	Angie: Lost Girls	Chase	
2022	Without Ward	Billy	
2022	Down & Out	Mack	Short film
2023	Maya	Detective Chase Dawson	
2023	The Do Over	Man	Short film

=== Television ===
Year	Title	Role	Notes
1995	Mister Rogers' Neighborhood	Himself	Episode: "1691: Mad Feelings"
1998	Beyond Belief: Fact or Fiction	State Trooper	Episode: "Deer Hunters"
1998–99	Awesome Adventures	Himself	Host (seasons 1–2)
1999	JAG	Seaman Hendrix	Episode: "Dungaree Justice"
1999	Stark Raving Mad	Waiter	Episode: "Fish Out of Water"
2000	Frasier	Waiter	Episode: "Something Borrowed, Someone Blue: Part 1 & 2"
2000	Movie Stars	Male Student	Episode: "Two Guys, Two Girls and a Guest House"
2000	Charmed	Paramedic	Episode: "The Honeymoon's Over"
2000–01	Popular	George Austin	Recurring role (season 2)
2001–05	Star Trek: Enterprise	Ensign Travis Mayweather	Main cast
2003	Half & Half	Ron Brown	Episode: "The Big Keep Your Eyes Off My Prize Episode"
2003	Player$	-	Episode: "Tenacious D a la Mode"
2003	Boomtown	Recruit Dwight Baker	Episode: "Wannabe"
2008	NCIS	Corporal George Linden	Episode: "Collateral Damage"
2009	House M.D.	James Carlton	Episode: "Painless"
2011–12	Single Ladies	Darryl	Recurring role (seasons 1–2)
2011–19	General Hospital	Andre Maddox	Regular cast
2012	The Client List	Tim	Episode: "Tough Love"
2013	Grey's Anatomy	Chris Ward	Episode: "Sleeping Monster"
2013	Baby Daddy	Marcus	Episode: "I'm Not That Guy"
2018	Greenleaf	Garner	Recurring role (season 3)
2019	Magnum P.I.	Roy Till	Episode: "Day I Met the Devil"
2019	Carole's Christmas	Marcus	TV movie
2020–21	The Family Business	Elijah	Main cast (season 2), recurring role (seasons 3–4)
2021	All the Queen's Men	Allen Fisk	Recurring role (season 1)
2022	B Positive	Kyle	Episode: "Louisville, Bubbaroo and Sully"

== Awards and nominations ==
List of acting awards and nominations
Year	Award	Category	Title	Result	Ref.
2014	Glyph Comics Award	Best Writer	Miles Away	Nominated	
2018	Daytime Emmy Award	Outstanding Supporting Actor in a Drama Series	General Hospital	Nominated	
