= BoyBand (film) =

- Directed by: Jon Artigo
- Written by: Jon Artigo
- Produced by: Andrea Ajemian; Barbara Guertin
- Starring: Michael Copon; Robert Hoffman; Ryan Hansen
- Cinematography: Brian Crane
- Edited by: Paul Buhl
- Music by: Kaz Gamble
- Production company: Artigo/Ajemian Films
- Release date: June 4, 2010
- Running time: 90 minutes
- Country: United States
- Language: English
- Budget: $750,000

BoyBand is a comedic feature film released in 2010 that depicts the fictional saga of the first ever American boy band. The film stars Michael Copon, Robert Hoffman, Ryan Hansen, Ryan Pinkston, Ernest Phillips, Lorenzo Hooker III, Kurt Fuller, Ming-Na, Richard Riehle, and Tom Wright. The film was shot entirely in the county of Worcester, Massachusetts and even features a fictional Worcester High School. BoyBand was produced by Worcester-based Artigo/Ajemian films. The film was written and directed by Jon Artigo, and produced by Andrea Ajemian. Kaz Gamble produced and recorded the entire soundtrack. The film is also known as BoyBand: Breakin' through in '82. Film Threat reviewed BoyBand, writing that "The problem entirely lies in a story, so wacky you can't relate to it and jokes that have no payoff. Boy Band is a wasted opportunity."

== Plot ==
In 1982, Brad Roberts is Worcester High School's star football quarterback and dating the captain of the cheerleading squad. He secretly plays in a heavy metal band, and dreams of being a pop star. Brad's parents are separated, but still live together, with his mom's new boyfriend Lou Pearlman. Lou is inspired to create the first ever American boy band, and Brad decides to become a part of it.
