= Dax Shepard =

American actor, comedian and filmmaker (born 1975)

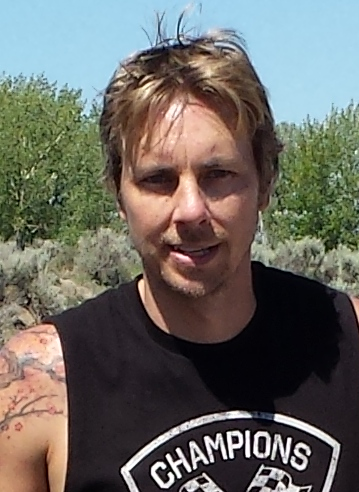
- Shepard in 2014
- Born: Dax Randall Shepard; January 2, 1975 (age 51); Ypsilanti, Michigan, U.S.
- Education: Santa Monica College; West Los Angeles College; University of California, Los Angeles (BA)
- Occupations: Actor; comedian; filmmaker; podcaster
- Years active: 1996–present
- Spouse: Kristen Bell (m. 2013)
- Children: 2

Dax Randall Shepard (born January 2, 1975) is an American actor, comedian, and filmmaker. Since 2018, he has hosted Armchair Expert, a podcast in which he interviews celebrities, journalists, and academics about their lives.

Shepard has appeared in the feature films Without a Paddle (2004), Zathura: A Space Adventure (2005), Employee of the Month (2006), Idiocracy (2006), Let's Go to Prison (2006), Hit and Run (2012), and CHiPs (2017), the last two of which he also wrote and directed. Shepard portrayed Crosby Braverman in the NBC comedy-drama series Parenthood from 2010 to 2015. He played Luke Matthews in the Netflix show The Ranch, co-starred in ABC's Bless This Mess and acted in the MTV practical joke reality series Punk'd (2003).

He is a co-founder of the diaper and baby product company Hello Bello with his wife Kristen Bell.

== Early life ==
Shepard was born at Beyer Hospital in Ypsilanti, Michigan, a city in southeastern Michigan. He is the son of Laura Louise LaBo, who worked at General Motors (GM), and David Robert "Dave" Shepard Sr., who was a car salesman. He is of part French-Canadian descent. His parents divorced when he was 3 years old. Shepard was sexually abused at age 7, which he believes was a major underlying cause of his later substance abuse issues. He did not reveal the abuse to anyone until 12 years after it occurred.

Shepard's mother had developed a substantial business by the time he was in high school. She worked car shows with traveling events at racetracks. She started as a janitor on the midnight shift at GM, then worked in fleet management at the GM proving grounds in Milford, Michigan, then hosted hospitality days for all the GM family members, eventually moving into public relations at an ad agency. She returned to GM, becoming the owner of four shops that managed publicity events for magazine journalists. From 14 to 18, Shepard worked for his mother on the road, going from racetrack to racetrack. For about two years, Shepard had a stepfather who was an engineer on the Corvette. Shepard's mother has been married four times; Shepard said he has had three stepfathers.

According to Shepard, his mother named him for the rich playboy Dax (Diogenes Alejandro Xenos), in Harold Robbins' novel The Adventurers. He has an older brother, David Shepard Jr., who lives in Oregon, and a younger half-sister, Carly Hatter, whom he cast in two films: 2012's Hit and Run and 2017's CHiPs. Through marriage, he is distantly related to George Washington on his mother's side.

Shepard has said that he was raised in Milford, although he lived in many suburbs of Detroit, growing up primarily in Walled Lake, Michigan. Shepard is dyslexic and said it inspired his acting career. He graduated from Walled Lake Central High School in 1993 before enrolling in The Groundlings school.

After attending Santa Monica College and West Los Angeles College, Shepard transferred to UCLA, where he graduated magna cum laude with a B.A. in anthropology. He had a deal with his mother that if he went to college she would pay his rent.

== Career ==
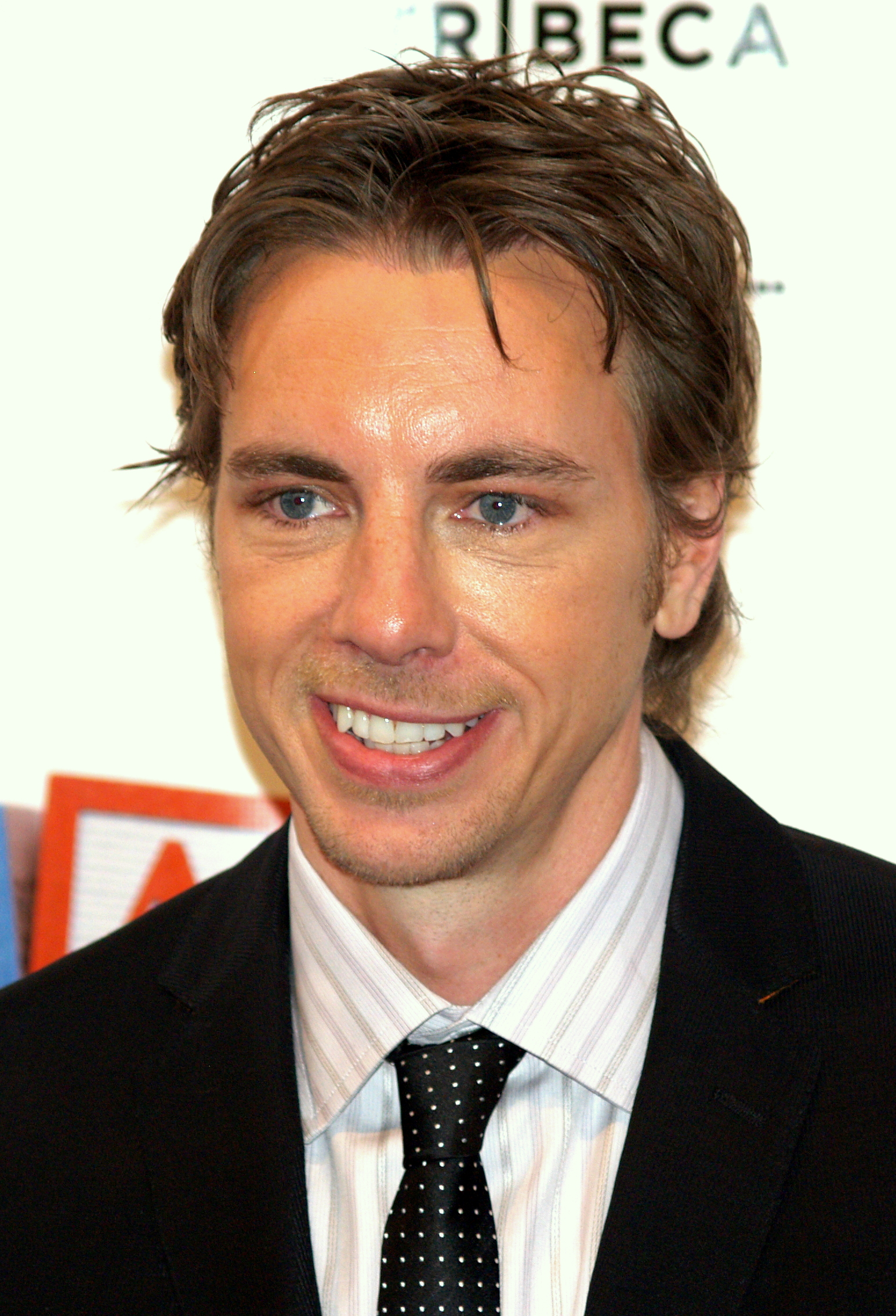
Shepard at the 2008 Tribeca Film Festival in New York City

After a year in Santa Barbara, California, he moved to Los Angeles in 1996. He found out about The Groundlings improv troupe from Santa Barbara friend, Kareem Elseify, who had spent time there. Shepard ended up auditioning (the first time he acted) and wound up taking improvisation and sketch comedy classes there, while attending UCLA. After about five years of classes, he got into the Sunday Company of The Groundlings—in a group that included Melissa McCarthy, Octavia Spencer, Fortune Feimster, Tate Taylor, and Nat Faxon.

From 2003 onwards, Shepard appeared in the improv Candid Camera-type show Punk'd, with Ashton Kutcher. When the show had its 2012 revival, he continued to appear. Shepard said he auditioned for Punk'd and, while doing the pilot, became friendly with Kutcher, who arranged for him to get an agent. He had auditioned unsuccessfully for ten years before landing the role in Punk'd, his first.

In 2004, Shepard starred in the comedy Without a Paddle, alongside Seth Green and Matthew Lillard. Despite negative reviews, the film was a commercial success that, as of 2009, grossed more than US$65 million worldwide. In 2005, he starred as The Astronaut in Zathura: A Space Adventure, a science fiction adventure fantasy film. In 2006, he appeared with Dane Cook and Jessica Simpson in the comedy Employee of the Month and in Mike Judge's film Idiocracy as the character Frito.

During the same time, Shepard began appearing in more films and landed his first main character role in Let's Go to Prison (2006), alongside Will Arnett and Chi McBride. He had a main role in the 2008 comedy Baby Mama, starring opposite Tina Fey and Amy Poehler. Shepard wrote the script for the Paramount venture Get 'Em Wet, where he again appeared with Arnett. In 2010, he wrote, directed, and starred in the low-budget satirical mockumentary feature Brother's Justice; the film won an Audience Award at the 2010 Austin Film Festival. He had a supporting role in the 2010 romantic comedy film When in Rome, which starred his future wife Kristen Bell.

From 2010 to 2015, Shepard was part of the main cast of the NBC drama Parenthood, playing Crosby Braverman.

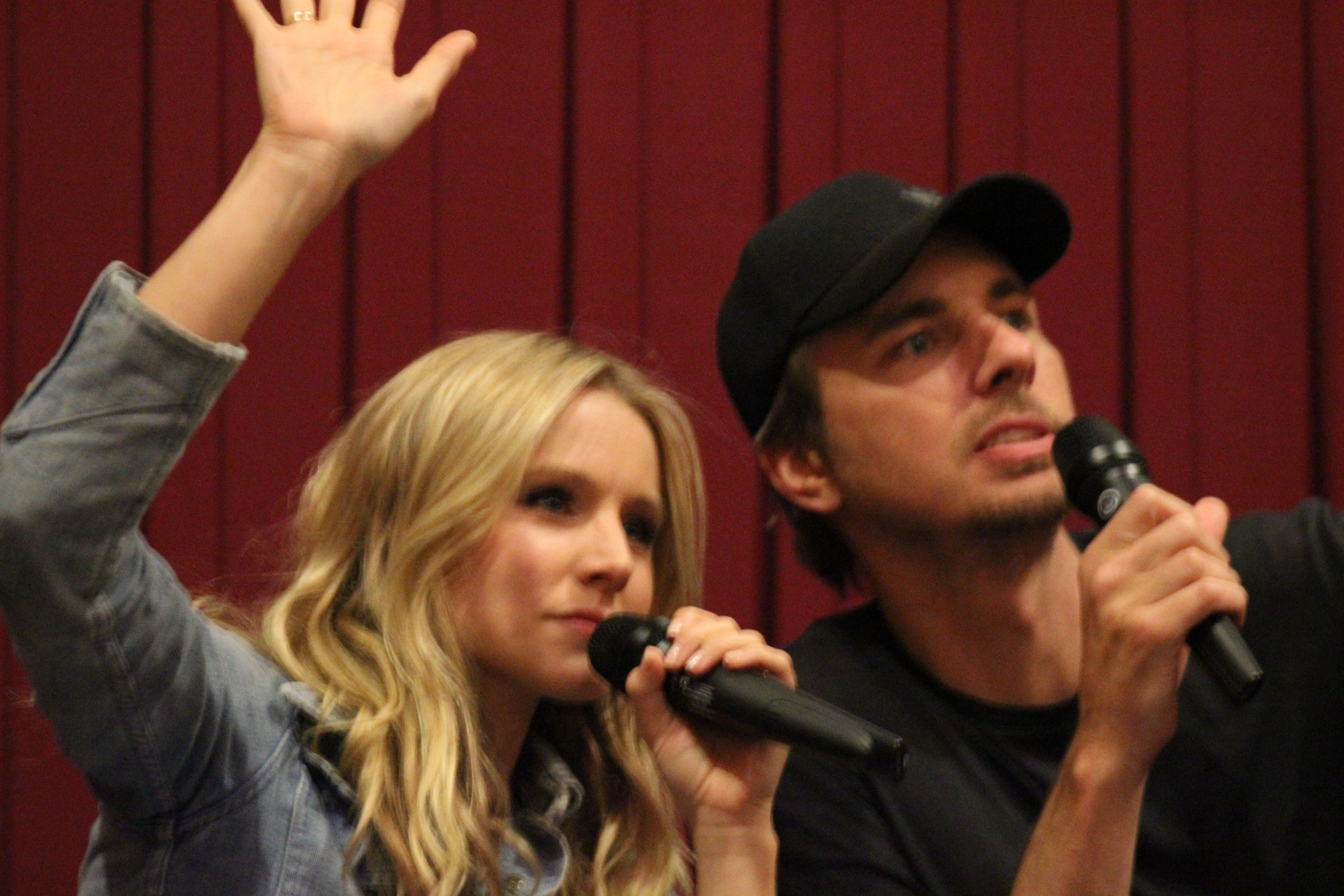
Kristen Bell and Dax Shepard

Shepard wrote, produced, co-directed, and starred in the 2012 low-budget film Hit and Run alongside Bell and his close friend Bradley Cooper. He said the movie, which includes numerous car chases and fast driving scenes, allowed him to live out his Smokey and the Bandit fantasy.

Shepard had a supporting role in the 2014 film The Judge.

In September 2014, Shepard starred with his wife, Kristen Bell, in a commercial for the Samsung Galaxy Tab S. It was so popular (with over 20 million YouTube views) that they did another commercial for the holiday season.

Shepard wrote and directed CHiPs, based on the 1977 to 1983 American crime drama CHiPs, where he starred as Officer Jon Baker alongside Michael Peña as Frank "Ponch" Poncherello. The project was released by Warner Bros. on March 24, 2017, to negative reviews.

On February 14, 2018, Shepard launched the podcast Armchair Expert with co-host Monica Padman. The show explores the stories of their guests. Featured guests on the show have included Barack Obama, Bill Gates, Kristen Bell, Ashton Kutcher, Will Ferrell, Julia Louis-Dreyfus, and hundreds of others. On June 7, 2018, the show released their first episode of "Experts on Expert", in which Shepard and Padman interview experts in their fields. Featured experts on the show have included psychologist Wendy Mogel, comedian and author David Sedaris, and speechwriter Jon Favreau. The show was the most popular new podcast on iTunes in 2018. On December 3, 2019, it was revealed that Shepard will be a host of the revived Top Gear America, which premiered on Motor Trend in January 2021. In 2024, the company secured a first-look deal with Wondery, a unit of Amazon, after the success of the podcast show Armchair Expert. In 2024, Armchair Expert was the 8th biggest podcast in the USA on Spotify's platform.

== Personal life ==
=== Relationships ===
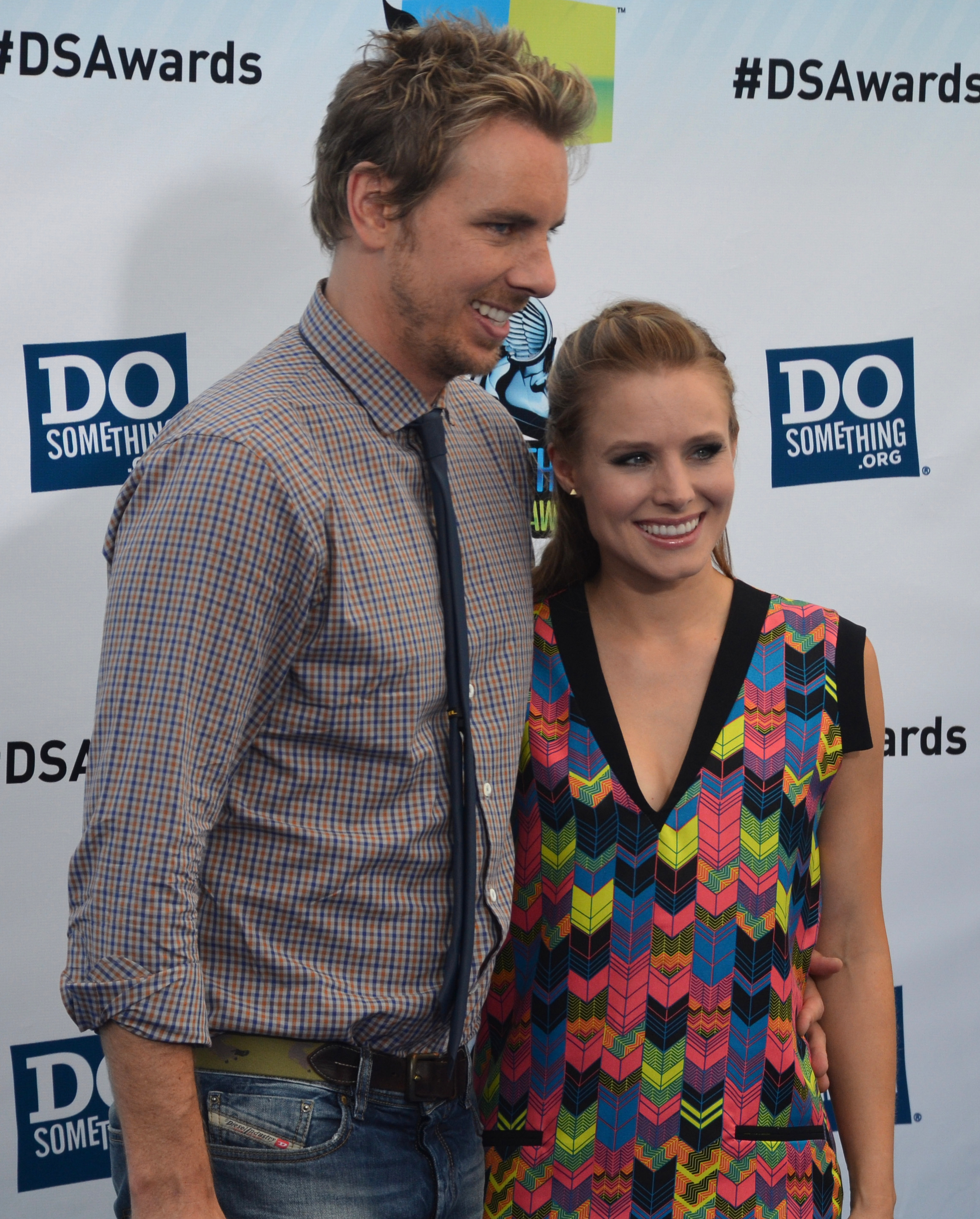
Shepard and Kristen Bell at the 2012 DoSomething Awards

Shepard met actress Kristen Bell, also a native of Detroit's northern suburbs, at the birthday party of a mutual friend; they began dating in late 2007. The couple announced their engagement in January 2010; they decided to delay marriage until the state of California passed legislation legalizing same-sex marriage. After section 3 of the Defense of Marriage Act was ruled unconstitutional by the Supreme Court on June 26, 2013, Bell asked Shepard through Twitter to marry her, which he accepted. They were married at the Beverly Hills County Clerk's Office on October 17, 2013. They have two daughters, born in March 2013 and December 2014.

=== Substance use problem ===
Shepard has said that, except for a year in high school when he used drugs, he did not have a substance abuse problem until he was 18 years old. After struggling for years with alcohol, cocaine, and pills, Shepard achieved sobriety in September 2004. On September 25, 2020, in a special episode of his podcast, Armchair Expert, Shepard revealed he had relapsed while recovering from an accident by using painkillers to augment a prescription. He announced that he was again sober, with seven days of sobriety as of the recording date (September 21, 2020).

=== Interests and charity work ===
Shepard races motorcycles at Buttonwillow Raceway Park, including his Ducati Hypermotard 1100S and Suzuki GSX-R1000. He donates much of his time to the Hollenbeck Youth Center, an after-school program that provides opportunity to at-risk inner-city youth. He has served as their official Master of Ceremonies, along with his friend Tom Arnold, for the Inner-City Games and Hollenbeck Youth Center's Miracle on 1st Street Toy Giveaway Program in East Los Angeles.

He is an avid car enthusiast. He owns the 1967 Lincoln Continental that was featured in the movie Hit and Run, and races off-road.

Shepard and his wife were advocates of California Senate Bill 606, called "no-kids paparazzi". Bell said: "We're not saying that we can't be newsworthy. We're saying that our child is not newsworthy." California Senate Bill 606 passed in 2013, with testimony by actresses Halle Berry and Jennifer Garner.

Shepard practices Transcendental Meditation.

== Filmography ==
=== Film ===
Year	Title	Role	Notes
1998	Hairshirt	Guy Vomiting at Party	Credited as Dax Sheppard
2003	Cheaper by the Dozen	Camera Crew Member	
2004	Without a Paddle	Tom Marshall	
2005	Confessions of an Action Star	SFX Coordinator	
2005	Zathura: A Space Adventure	Adult Walter / The Astronaut	
2006	Employee of the Month	Vince Downey	
2006	Idiocracy	Frito Pendejo	
2006	Let's Go to Prison	John Lyshitski	
2007	Knocked Up	Himself	Uncredited cameo
2007	Smother	Noah Cooper	
2007	The Comebacks	Sheriff	
2007	Cutlass	Background extra #1	Short film
2008	Baby Mama	Carl Loomis	
2009	Old Dogs	Gary	Uncredited cameo
2010	When in Rome	Gale	
2010	Reunited	Hugh Patterson	Short film
2010	Shrink Test	Himself	Short film
2010	The Freebie	Darren	
2010	Brother's Justice	Himself	Also writer, director, and stunt coordinator
2012	Hit and Run	Charlie Bronson / Yul Perrkins	Also writer, director, and editor
2014	Veronica Mars	Overconfident Club Boy	Cameo
2014	This Is Where I Leave You	Wade Beaufort	
2014	The Judge	C.P. Kennedy	
2015	Motorcycle vs. Car Drift Battle 4	White Fang	Short film
2017	CHiPS	Jon Baker	Also writer, director, and producer
2017	El Camino Christmas	Deputy Billy Calhoun	
2020	Buddy Games	Durfy	
2021	Paw Patrol: The Movie	Ruben	Voice

=== Television ===
Year	Title	Role	Notes
2003	The Tom Green Show	Himself	1 episode
2003–2012	Punk'd	Himself	56 episodes
2004	Life with Bonnie	Kyle Levine, Dr. Iskarr	2 episodes
2004–2008	King of the Hill	Zack, Asa	Voice; 3 episodes
2005	My Name Is Earl	Dirk	1 episode
2005–2021	Robot Chicken	Various voices	Voice; 5 episodes
2006–2025	Jimmy Kimmel Live!	Himself	Guest; 29 episodes
2007	The Naked Trucker and T-Bones Show	Joe Sands	1 episode
2007	Halfway Home	Ben	1 episode
2009	The Goode Family	Steve	Voice; 1 episode
2010–2015	Parenthood	Crosby Braverman	Main role; also director
2011	Good Vibes	Jag Knullerbrod, Smilin' Mike	Voice; 2 episodes
2013	Hollywood Game Night	Himself	Contestant; 1 episode
2014–2015	About a Boy	Crosby Braverman	2 episodes; also director
2014–2015	Web Therapy	Abel Jans	3 episodes
2015	It's Always Sunny in Philadelphia	Jojo	1 episode
2015	Parks and Recreation	Hank Muntak	1 episode
2015	Comedy Bang! Bang!	Himself	1 episode
2017	SuperMansion	Titanium Dax	Voice; 2 episodes
2017	Wet Hot American Summer: Ten Years Later	Mikey	2 episodes
2017	Ghosted	SAM	Episode: "Sam"
2018	The Good Place	Chet	Episode: "Rhonda, Diana, Jake, and Trent"
2018	The Final Table	Himself	Episode: "USA"
2018–2020	The Ranch	Luke Matthews	Main role
2019–2020	Bless This Mess	Mike	Main role; also producer
2019	Spin the Wheel	Himself	Host; also producer
2020	Jeopardy! The Greatest of All Time	Himself	Video clue presenter; 1 episode
2021	Top Gear America	Himself	Host
2021	Family Game Fight!	Himself	Host; 8 episodes
2021	HouseBroken	Rutabaga	Voice; episode: "Who's a Good Therapist?"
2021	Ultra City Smiths	Congressman Chris Pecker	Voice; 6 episodes
2022	Stoner Cats	Chad, Chad Wilkins	Voice; 3 episodes

== Awards and nominations ==
Year	Award show	Category	Work	Result	Ref.
2003	Teen Choice Awards	Choice TV Reality/Variety Star – Male	Punk'd	Nominated	
2015	People's Choice Awards	Favorite Dramatic TV Actor	Parenthood	Nominated	
2020	People's Choice Awards	Top Podcast of the Year	Armchair Expert	Nominated	
2026	Golden Globe Awards	Best Podcast	Armchair Expert	Nominated	
