= Brother's Justice =

Brother's Justice (The Attempted Making of)
- Directed by: David Palmer; Dax Shepard
- Written by: Dax Shepard
- Produced by: Nate Tuck
- Starring: Dax Shepard; Tom Arnold; Bradley Cooper; David Koechner; Michael Rosenbaum; Nate Tuck
- Cinematography: David Palmer
- Edited by: Dan O'Hara
- Music by: Julian Wass; Kenny Carkeet
- Release date: 2010
- Running time: 80 minutes
- Country: United States
- Language: English

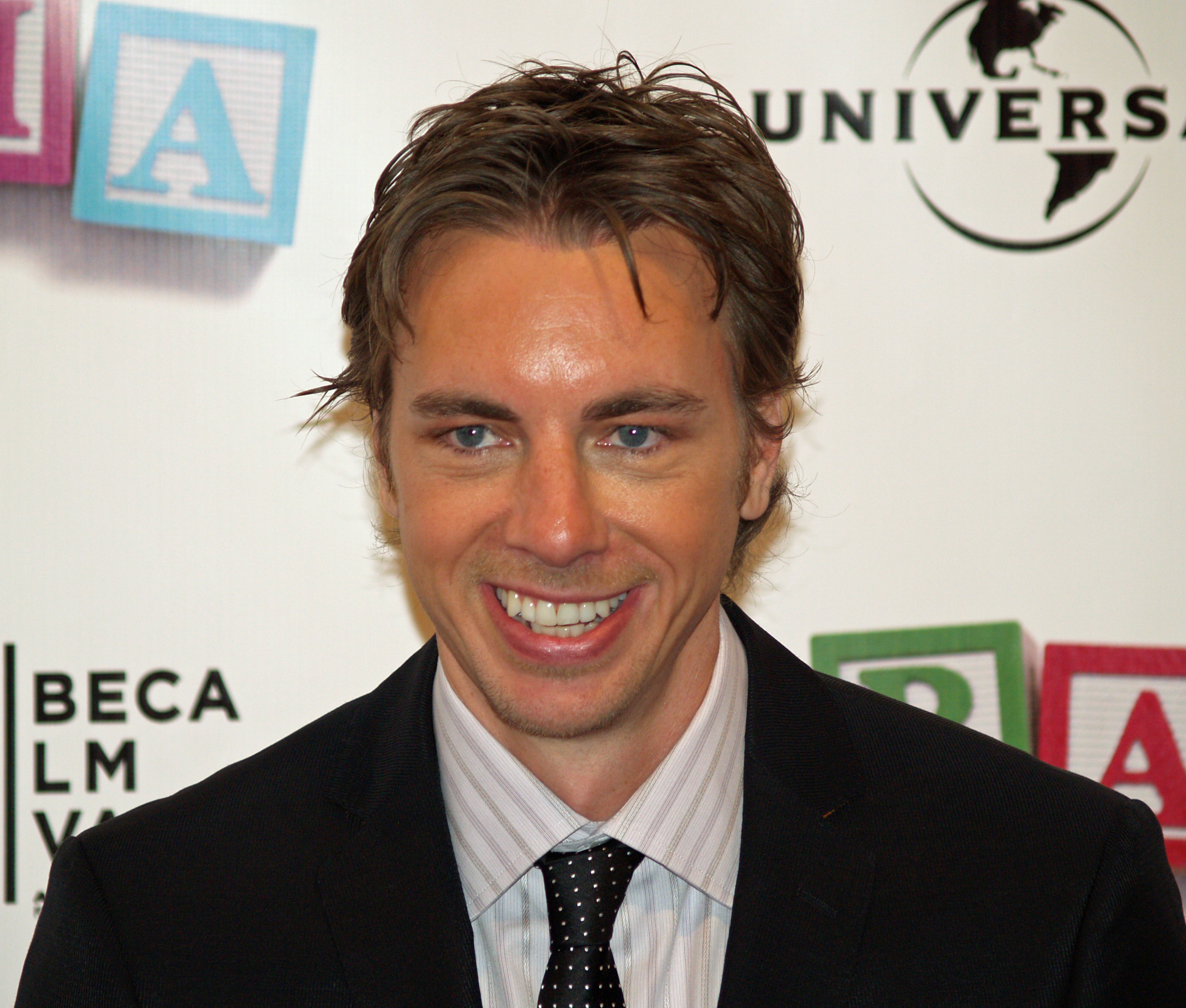
Lead actor Dax Shepard

Brother's Justice (The Attempted Making of) is a 2010 comedy film written by Dax Shepard. The film is a satirical mockumentary about Dax Shepard's transformation from comedian to a silver screen martial arts star. Shepard exploits any and all Hollywood connections on his quest to become the next Chuck Norris. The film represents the Hollywood film producing process.

The film won an Austin Film Festival award.

== Cast ==
- Dax Shepard
- Nate Tuck
- Ashton Kutcher
- Tom Arnold
- Bradley Cooper
- David Koechner
- Jon Favreau
- Ryan Hansen
- Seth Green

== Release ==
On October 26, 2010, Dax Shepard had released a trailer for his film Brother's Justice.

== Reception ==
On review aggregator website Rotten Tomatoes, the film has an approval rating of 0% based on reviews from 9 critics, with an average rating of 3.4/10. On Metacritic, the film has a weighted average score of 22 out of 100, based on 7 critics, indicating "generally unfavorable" reviews.

Dennis Harvey of Variety wrote "It's an easy watch that nonetheless consistently feels like a grazing blow rather than a knockout". Nick Schager of Slant Magazine added his criticism of the film, stating "Dax Shepard delivers an I'm Still Here-style mockumentary of staggering incompetence with Brother's Justice".

Eric Hynes of Time Out gave the film 1 star out of 5, while Andy Webster of The New York Times called the film "an ultralow-budget".

The Village Voice's Aaron Hillis compared Brother's Justice to an overlong episode of Curb Your Enthusiasm, adding that unlike that show "this film has none of the wit and is twice as irritating".

According to Gary Goldstein of the Los Angeles Times "It's better to revisit such memorable Hollywood satires as The Big Picture or For Your Consideration before indulging Shepard's uninspired whimsy".

== Awards ==
- 2010 Austin Film Festival Audience Award Winner: Comedy Vanguard
