= Sick Puppies discography =

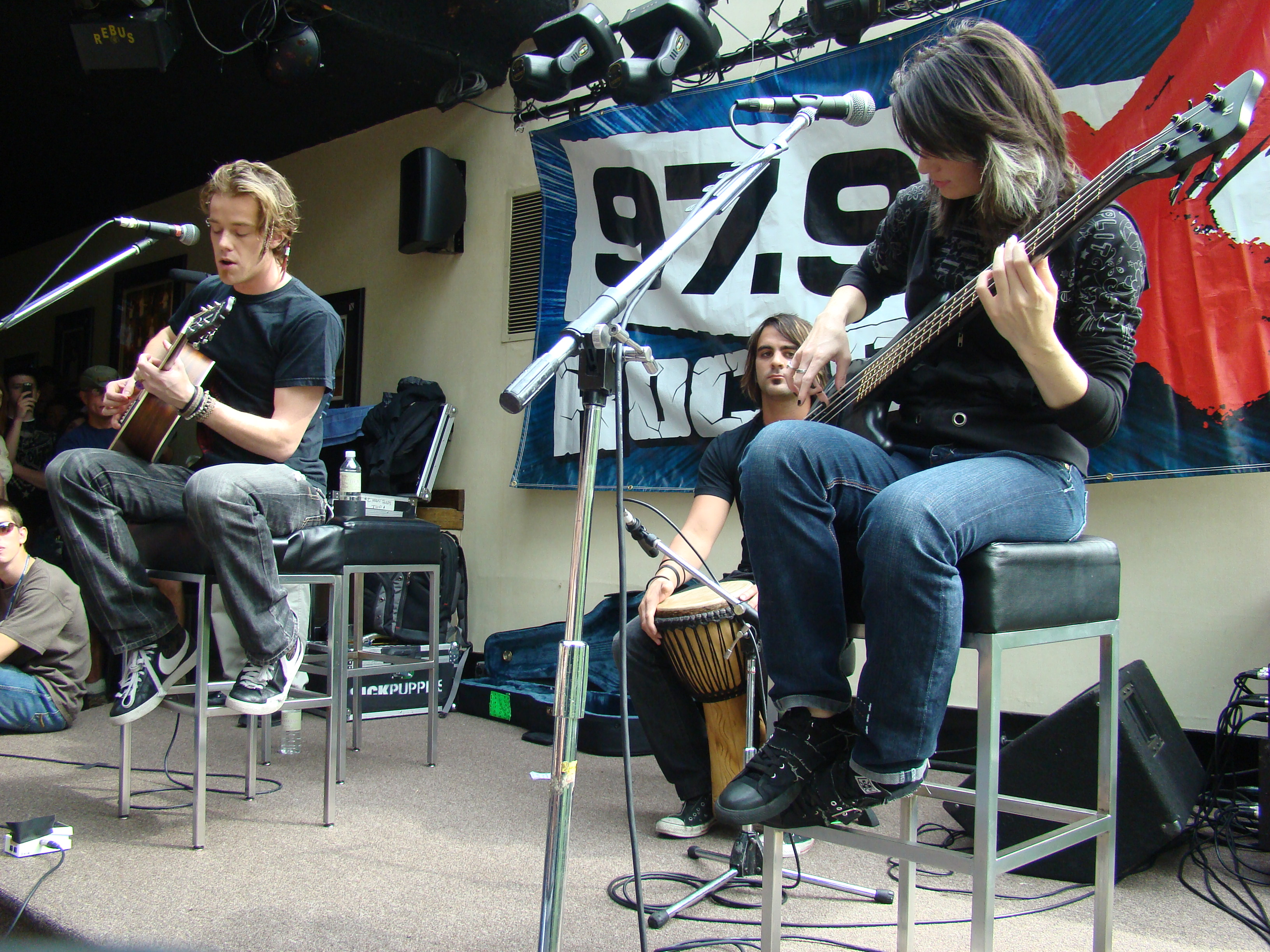
- Sick Puppies acoustic in 2008
- Studio albums: 5
- Extended plays: 6
- Live albums: 1
- Singles: 15
- Music videos: 16

The discography of Sick Puppies, an Australian hard rock band, consists of five studio albums, six extended plays, 16 music videos and 15 singles.

== Albums ==
=== Studio albums ===
| Title | Details | Peak chart positions | | | | | | |
| Title | Details | AUS | NZ | UK | US | US Alt. | US Heat. | US Rock |
|---|---|---|---|---|---|---|---|---|
| Welcome to the Real World | Released: 3 September 2001; Label: Transistor Music | — | — | — | — | — | — | — |
| Dressed Up as Life | Released: 3 April 2007; Label: Virgin | 62 | — | — | 181 | — | 4 | — |
| Tri-Polar | Released: 14 July 2009; Label: Virgin | — | 40 | 148 | 31 | 9 | — | 12 |
| Connect | Released: 16 July 2013; Label: Capitol | — | — | — | 17 | 2 | — | 3 |
| Fury | Released: 20 May 2016; Label: DrillDown Entertainment Group | — | — | — | 92 | 10 | — | 13 |
| Wave The Bull | Released: 28 March 2025; Label: ONErpm | — | — | — | — | — | — | — |
"—" denotes a release that did not chart.

=== Live albums ===
| Title | Details |
|---|---|
| Live at House of Blues Cleveland | Released: 21 June 2011; Label: Virgin |

== Extended plays ==
| Title | Details | Peak chart positions | | | | |
| Title | Details | AUS | US | US Alt. | US Hard Rock | US Rock |
|---|---|---|---|---|---|---|
| Dog's Breakfast | Released: 1999; Label: S&M | — | — | — | — | — |
| Fly | Released: 2003; Label: Independent | — | — | — | — | — |
| Headphone Injuries | Released: 2006; Label: Adrenaline | — | — | — | — | — |
| Sick Puppies EP | Released: 2006; Label: Roadshow | 65 | — | — | — | — |
| Live & Unplugged | Released: 6 April 2010; Label: Virgin | — | — | — | — | — |
| Polar Opposite | Released: 1 March 2011; Label: Virgin | — | 94 | 18 | 4 | 24 |
"—" denotes a release that did not chart.

== Singles ==
| Year | Title | Peak chart positions | | | | | | | | | | Certifications | Album |
| Year | Title | AUS | CAN | NLD | UK | US | US Adult | US Alt. | US Main. | US Pop | US Rock | Certifications | Album |
|---|---|---|---|---|---|---|---|---|---|---|---|---|---|
| 2001 | "Nothing Really Matters" (AUS only) | — | — | — | — | — | — | — | — | — | — | | Welcome to the Real World |
| 2001 | "Every Day" (AUS only) | — | — | — | — | — | — | — | — | — | — | | Welcome to the Real World |
| 2001 | "Rock Kids" (AUS only) | — | — | — | — | — | — | — | — | — | — | | Welcome to the Real World |
| 2003 | "Fly" (AUS only) | — | — | — | — | — | — | — | — | — | — | | Fly |
| 2006 | "All the Same" | — (Note: "All the Same" did not enter the ARIA Singles Chart, but peaked at number 47 on the ARIA Digital Track Chart.) | — | — | — | — | — | 8 | 36 | — | — | RIAA: Gold | Dressed Up as Life |
| 2007 | "My World" | — | — | — | — | — | — | 20 | — | — | — | | Dressed Up as Life |
| 2008 | "What Are You Looking For" | — | — | — | — | — | — | 34 | — | — | — | | Dressed Up as Life |
| 2008 | "Pitiful" | — | — | — | — | — | — | — | — | — | — | | Dressed Up as Life |
| 2008 | "Killing Myself for Christmas" | — | — | — | — | — | — | — | — | — | — | | —N/a |
| 2009 | "You're Going Down" | — | — | — | — | — (Note: "You're Going Down" did not enter the Billboard Hot 100, but peaked at number eight on the Bubbling Under Hot 100 Singles chart.) | — | 11 | 2 | — | 8 | RIAA: Platinum | Tri-Polar |
| 2009 | "Odd One" | — | — | — | — | — | — | 15 | 6 | — | 10 | | Tri-Polar |
| 2010 | "Maybe" | 54 | 99 | 96 | 130 | 56 | 8 | 6 | 20 | 22 | 15 | ARIA: Gold; RIAA: Gold | Tri-Polar |
| 2011 | "Riptide" | — | — | — | — | — | — | 14 | 3 | — | 6 | RIAA: Gold | Tri-Polar |
| 2013 | "There's No Going Back" | — | — | — | — | — | — | 24 | 2 | — | 16 | | Connect |
| 2013 | "Gunfight" | — | — | — | — | — | — | — | 15 | — | — | | Connect |
| 2014 | "Die to Save You" | — | — | — | — | — | — | — | — | — | — | | Connect |
| 2014 | "Connect" | — | — | — | — | — | — | — | — | — | — | | Connect |
| 2016 | "Stick to Your Guns" | — | — | — | — | — | — | — | 13 | — | — | | Fury |
| 2016 | "Where Do I Begin" | — | — | — | — | — | — | — | 23 | — | — | | Fury |
| 2024 | "There Goes The Neighborhood" | — | — | — | — | — | — | — | — | — | — | | Wave The Bull |
| 2024 | "Going Places" | — | — | — | — | — | — | — | 25 | — | — | | Wave The Bull |
"—" denotes a release that did not chart.

== Promotional singles ==
| Year | Single | Album |
|---|---|---|
| 2007 | "Too Many Words" | Dressed Up as Life |
| 2007 | "Howard's Tale" | Dressed Up as Life |
| 2009 | "War" | Tri-Polar |
| 2009 | "Don't Walk Away" | Tri-Polar |
| 2013 | "Walking Away" | Connect |
| 2013 | "Under a Very Black Sky" | Connect |
| 2016 | "Killing Time" | Fury |
| 2016 | "Earth to You" | Fury |
| 2024 | "Creature" | Wave the Bull |
| 2025 | "Friends Like You" | Wave the Bull |
| 2025 | "Find a Way" | Wave the Bull |

== Music videos ==
| Year | Song | Director | Album |
|---|---|---|---|
| 2000 | "Nothing Really Matters" | Unknown | Demo |
| 2001 | "Every Day" | Unknown | Welcome to the Real World |
| 2003 | "Fly" | Unknown | Fly |
| 2006 | "All the Same (Free Hugs Campaign)" | Shimon Moore | Dressed Up as Life |
| 2007 | "All the Same (Storyline)" | S. Pax Franchot | Dressed Up as Life |
| 2008 | "My World" | S. Pax Franchot | Dressed Up as Life |
| 2008 | "What Are You Looking For" | Fan Video Contest Winners | Dressed Up as Life |
| 2008 | "Pitiful" | Shimon Moore | Dressed Up as Life |
| 2009 | "You're Going Down" | Ryan Smith | Tri-Polar |
| 2010 | "Odd One" | Frank Borin | Tri-Polar |
| 2010 | "Maybe" | Travis Kopach | Tri-Polar |
| 2011 | "Riptide" | Travis Kopach | Tri-Polar |
| 2013 | "There's No Going Back" | P.R. Brown | Connect |
| 2014 | "Die to Save You" | Possum Hill | Connect |
| 2016 | "Stick to Your Guns" | Nathan Cox | Fury |
| 2017 | "Black And Blue" | Matthew JC | Fury |
| 2024 | "There Goes the Neighborhood" | Peanut Butter Friends | Wave the Bull |
| 2024 | "Going Places" | Nathan Cox | Wave the Bull |
| 2024 | "Creature" | Unknown | Wave the Bull |
| 2025 | "Friends Like You" | Unknown | Wave the Bull |
| 2025 | "Find a Way" | Unknown | Wave the Bull |
| 2025 | "Knock Your Lights Out" | Unknown | Wave the Bull |

== Other appearances ==
| Year | Song | Title |
|---|---|---|
| 2009 | "Street Fighter (War)" | Street Fighter IV |
| 2009 | "Street Fighter (War)" | Washington Capitals 2009 Stanley Cup playoffs introduction video |
| 2009 | "You're Going Down" | Extreme Rules |
| 2010 | "You're Going Down" | SmackDown vs. Raw 2010 |
| 2010 | "You're Going Down" | My Soul to Take |
| 2010 | "You're Going Down" | Tekken |
| 2010 | "That Time of Year" | NCIS: The Official TV Soundtrack - Vol. 2 |
