= Headphone Injuries =

EP by Sick Puppies
- Released: 20 June 2006
- Recorded: 2006 at Rock Mafia Studios in Santa Monica, California
- Genre: Post-grunge; alternative metal
- Length: 13:52
- Label: Adrenaline
- Producer: Rock Mafia (Tim James, Antonina Armato)

Sick Puppies chronology
Fly (2003)	Headphone Injuries (2006)	Sick Puppies EP (2006)

Headphone Injuries is the third EP by Australian rock band Sick Puppies. This EP was released digitally on 20 June 2006.

The EP was originally planned to be released on CD within a couple months of its digital release. Due to the success of the Free Hugs music video for the song "All the Same", the band opted to put out the Sick Puppies EP instead. The EP contains the same songs as Headphone Injuries with the addition of "All the Same". It is the first release to feature Mark Goodwin on drums.

== Track listing ==
1. "My World" – 3:58
2. "Pitiful" – 3:44
3. "Asshole Father" – 2:59
4. "Deliverance" – 3:11

== Personnel ==
Sick Puppies

- Shim Moore – lead vocals, lead guitar
- Emma Anzai – bass, backing vocals
- Mark Goodwin – drums

Production

- Tim James – producer, mixing
- Antonina Armato – producer
- Paul Palmer – A&R, mixing
- Dorian Crozier – engineer
- Nigel Lundemo – engineer, assistant
- Paul Stepanek – management
