= Sick Puppies EP =

EP by Sick Puppies
- Released: 2006
- Recorded: 2006 at Rock Mafia Studios in Santa Monica, California
- Genre: Post-grunge; alternative metal
- Length: 17:18
- Label: Roadshow; 301350-2
- Producer: Rock Mafia (Tim James, Antonina Armato)

Sick Puppies chronology
Headphone Injuries (2006)	Sick Puppies EP (2006)	Dressed Up as Life (2007)

Sick Puppies EP is the fourth EP by Australia rock band Sick Puppies. The EP was sold at live events and is now only available on the secondhand market. The EP was released as an enhanced CD with bonus multimedia content featuring lyrics, a photo gallery, the YouTube Free Hugs video for "All the Same", and a live video trailer. All the tracks were re-released on the album Dressed Up As Life.

== Track listing ==
No.	Title	Writer(s)	Length
1.	"My World"	Anzai, Armato, James, Moore	3:59
2.	"Pitiful"	Anzai, Armato, James, Moore	3:45
3.	"Deliverance"	Anzai, Creswell, Moore	3:11
4.	"Asshole Father"	Anzai, Armato, James, Moore	3:00
5.	"All the Same" (radio edit)	Anzai, Armato, James, Moore	3:28
Total length:			17:18

== Personnel ==
Credits for Sick Puppies EP adapted from liner notes.

Sick Puppies

- Shim Moore – lead vocals, lead guitar
- Emma Anzai – bass, backing vocals
- Mark Goodwin – drums

Production

- Tim James – producer, mixing
- Antonina Armato – producer
- Paul Palmer – A&R, mixing
- Dorian Crozier – engineer
- Nigel Lundemo – engineer, assistant
- Paul Stepanek – management

Artwork

- Asphyxia – cover artwork
- Nigel Skeet – photography

== Charts ==
Chart performance for Sick Puppies EP
Chart (2006)	Peak position
Australian Albums (ARIA)	65
