= 4th Critics' Choice Documentary Awards =

Critics' Choice Documentary Awards 2019

- Date: November 10, 2019
- Site: Brooklyn, New York, United States
- Hosted by: Jonathan Scott
- Official website: www.criticschoice.com

The 4th Critics' Choice Documentary Awards were presented on November 10, 2019. at the BRIC in Brooklyn, New York, honoring the finest achievements in documentary filmmaking and non-fiction television, the ceremony was hosted by Jonathan Scott. The nominees were announced in October 14, 2019, with The Biggest Little Farm leading the nominations with seven.

== Special awards ==
At the ceremony, director Michael Apted received "The Landmark Award", and filmmaker Frederick Wiseman was presented as the recipient for "The D A Pennebaker Award" (previously called the Critics’ Choice Lifetime Achievement Award).

== Winners and nominees ==
Best Documentary Feature: Apollo 11 (Neon); American Factory (Netflix); The Biggest Little Farm (Neon); The Cave (National Geographic); Honeyland (Neon); The Kingmaker (Showtime); Knock Down the House (Netflix); Leaving Neverland (HBO); Maiden (Sony Pictures Classics); One Child Nation (Amazon Studios); They Shall Not Grow Old (Warner Bros.)	Best Director: Peter Jackson – They Shall Not Grow Old; Steven Bognar and Julia Reichert – American Factory; Waad Al-Kateab and Edward Watts – For Sama; John Chester – The Biggest Little Farm; Feras Fayyad – The Cave; Todd Douglas Miller – Apollo 11; Nanfu Wang and Jialing Zhang – One Child Nation
Best First Documentary Feature: Tamara Kotevska and Ljubomir Stefanov – Honeyland; Midge Costin – Making Waves: The Art of Cinematic Sound; A.J. Eaton – David Crosby: Remember My Name; Pamela B. Green – Be Natural: The Untold Story of Alice Guy-Blaché; Richard Miron – For the Birds; Garret Price – Love, Antosha	Most Innovative Documentary: They Shall Not Grow Old (Warner Bros.); Aquarela (Sony Pictures Classics); Cold Case Hammarskjöld (Magnolia); Rolling Thunder Revue: A Bob Dylan Story by Martin Scorsese (Netflix); Screwball (Greenwich); Serendipity (Cohen Media)
Best Archival Documentary: Apollo 11 (Neon); Amazing Grace (Neon); Maiden (Sony Pictures Classics); Mike Wallace Is Here (Magnolia); Pavarotti (CBS Films); Rolling Thunder Revue: A Bob Dylan Story by Martin Scorsese (Netflix); They Shall Not Grow Old (Warner Bros.); What's My Name: Muhammad Ali (HBO)	Best Short Documentary: Period. End of Sentence. (Netflix); The Chapel at the Border (Atlantic Documentaries); Death Row Doctor (The New York Times Op-Docs); In the Absence (Field of Vision); Lost World; Mack Wrestles (ESPN); The Polaroid Job (The New York Times Op-Docs); Sam and the Plant Next Door (The Guardian); The Unconditional; The Waiting Room (The Guardian)
Best Political Documentary: American Factory (Netflix); The Edge of Democracy (Netflix); Hail Satan? (Magnolia); The Kingmaker (Showtime); Knock Down the House (Netflix); One Child Nation (Amazon Studios)	Best Sports Documentary: Maiden (Sony Pictures Classics); Bethany Hamilton: Unstoppable (Entertainment Studios); Diego Maradona (HBO); Rodman: For Better or Worse (ESPN); The Spy Behind Home Plate (Ciesla Foundation); What's My Name: Muhammad Ali (HBO)
Best Biographical Documentary: Toni Morrison: The Pieces I Am (Magnolia); David Crosby: Remember My Name (Sony Pictures Classics); The Kingmaker (Showtime); Linda Ronstadt: The Sound of My Voice (Greenwich); Love, Antosha (Lurker Films); Mike Wallace Is Here (Magnolia); Pavarotti (CBS Films)	Best Science/Nature Documentary: Apollo 11 (Neon); Anthropocene: The Human Epoch (Kino Lorber); Aquarela (Sony Pictures Classic); The Biggest Little Farm (Neon); The Elephant Queen (Apple); Honeyland (Neon); Penguins (Disney); Sea of Shadows (National Geographic)
Best Narration: Western Stars – Bruce Springsteen, narrator and writer; Anthropocene: The Human Epoch – Alicia Vikander, narrator; Jennifer Baichwal, writer; The Biggest Little Farm – John Chester, Molly Chester, narrators; John Chester, writer; The Edge of Democracy – Petra Costa, narrator; Petra Costa, Carol Pires, David Barker, Moara Passoni, writers; The Elephant Queen – Chiwetel Ejiofor, narrator; Mark Deeble, writer; For Sama – Waad Al-Kateab, narrator and writer; Joseph Pulitzer: Voice of the People – Adam Driver, narrator; Oren Rudavsky and Bob Seidman, writers; One Child Nation – Nanfu Wang, narrator and writer	Most Compelling Living Subject of a Documentary: Dr. Amani Ballor – The Cave; David Crosby – David Crosby: Remember My Name; Tracy Edwards – Maiden; Imelda Marcos – The Kingmaker; Hatidze Muratova – Honeyland; Alexandria Ocasio-Cortez, Amy Vilela, Cori Bush and Paula Jean Swearengin – Knock Down the House; Linda Ronstadt – Linda Ronstadt: The Sound of My Voice; Dr. Ruth Westheimer – Ask Dr. Ruth
Best Music Documentary: Linda Ronstadt: The Sound of My Voice (Greenwich); Amazing Grace (Neon); David Crosby: Remember My Name (Sony Pictures Classics); Miles Davis: Birth of the Cool (Abramorama); Pavarotti (CBS Films); Rolling Thunder Revue: A Bob Dylan Story by Martin Scorsese (Netflix); Western Stars (Warner Bros.)	Best Score: Matt Morton – Apollo 11; Jeff Beal – The Biggest Little Farm; Matthew Herbert – The Cave; Plan 9 – They Shall Not Grow Old; H. Scott Salinas – Sea of Shadows; Eicca Toppinen – Aquarela
Best Cinematography: John Chester – The Biggest Little Farm; Ben Bernhard and Viktor Kossakovsky – Aquarela; Fejmi Daut and Samir Ljuma – Honeyland; Nicholas de Pencier – Anthropocene: The Human Epoch; Muhammed Khair Al Shami, Ammar Suleiman, and Mohammad Eyad – The Cave; Richard Ladkani – Sea of Shadows	Best Editing: Todd Douglas Miller – Apollo 11; Georg Michael Fischer and Verena Schönauer – Sea of Shadows; Jabez Olssen – They Shall Not Grow Old; Amy Overbeck – The Biggest Little Farm; Lindsay Utz – American Factory; Nanfu Wang – One Child Nation

== Films by multiple nominations and wins ==
The following films received multiple nominations:

Nominations	Film
7	The Biggest Little Farm
6	They Shall Not Grow Old
6	Apollo 11
5	The Cave
5	One Child Nation
5	Honeyland
4	American Factory
4	The Kingmaker
4	David Crosby: Remember My Name
4	Aquarela
4	Sea of Shadows
4	Maiden
3	Pavarotti
3	Linda Ronstadt: The Sound of My Voice
3	Rolling Thunder Revue: A Bob Dylan Story by Martin Scorsese
3	Knock Down the House
3	Anthropocene: The Human Epoch
2	The Edge of Democracy
2	The Elephant Queen
2	Western Stars
2	What's My Name: Muhammad Ali
2	Love, Antosha
2	Amazing Grace
2	Mike Wallace Is Here
2	For Sama

The following films received multiple awards:

Wins	Film
5	Apollo 11
2	American Factory
2	Honeyland
2	Maiden
2	They Shall Not Grow Old
2	Linda Ronstadt: The Sound of My Voice

== See also ==
- 92nd Academy Awards
- 72nd Primetime Creative Arts Emmy Awards
