= Rock Prophecies =

- Directed by: John Chester
- Produced by: Tim Kaiser
- Starring: Robert M. Knight; Jeff Beck; Slash; Steve Vai; Carlos Santana; ZZ Top; Def Leppard; Kenny Wayne Shepherd; Joe Bonamassa; Steve Lukather; Jason Bonham; Panic! at the Disco; Sick Puppies; Tyler Dow Bryant
- Cinematography: John Chester
- Edited by: Amy Wilson; John Chester
- Release date: 2009
- Country: United States
- Language: English

Rock Prophecies is a 2009 documentary film concerning rock photographer Robert M. Knight. It was directed by John Chester (Lost In Woonsocket, A&E's Random 1) and produced by Tim Kaiser (Seinfeld, Will and Grace).

== Synopsis ==
The film tells the story of Robert M. Knight, a rock photographer born and raised in Honolulu, who holds the distinction of being one of the first photographers to capture Jimi Hendrix and Led Zeppelin, and the last to photograph Stevie Ray Vaughan. Over the course of the film, Robert revisits the friends and idols of his past, such as Jeff Beck, Slash, Carlos Santana, and Steve Vai, while helping to kick-start the careers of the Australian band Sick Puppies. Protective of his photo archive, the photographer struggles with his mother's costly around-the-clock care, and debates whether to sell the 200,000+ photos that mean so much to him.

== Life ==
Hoping to escape a somewhat sheltered upbringing, courtesy of his mother and Baptist minister father, Robert became a travel agent at the age of 16 and worked up the credits to fly to London. With the help of a friend, Robert found himself on the set of the Michelangelo Antonioni film Blowup, and concluded that he had to be a part of what was happening in the culture at that time, and saved up to buy a camera. With an apparent combination of luck and friendliness, Knight began to get himself into the press pit at rock concerts, and in the process befriended such rock 'n roll luminaries as Jeff Beck, Elton John, and the members of Led Zeppelin. Robert became very close with Stevie Ray Vaughan, and is still haunted by his place in history as Stevie's final photographer.
