= Joshua Ray =

Joshua Ray Gooch
- Born: January 16, 1991 (age 35); Seattle, Washington, United States
- Origin: San Diego, California, United States
- Genres: Blues rock, rock, Country, pop, funk
- Occupations: Musician, guitarist, record producer, songwriter
- Instrument: Guitar
- Years active: 2009 – present

Josh "Joshua Ray" Gooch (born January 16, 1991) is an American guitarist, songwriter and music producer. Joshua is the lead guitarist for Shania Twain. Joshua has also toured with Koshi Inaba of B'z and blues artist Beth Hart. He has recorded with producers Ross Hogarth, Don Gehman, and Johnny Sandlin. Joshua is managed by Robert M. Knight.

== Biography ==
Joshua Ray was born in Seattle, Washington. He relocated to San Diego with his family at the age of seven. Josh credits his father for his interest in guitar, since he was always playing and improvising songs around the house. After Josh fell in love with the guitar at 14 years old, he quickly became addicted to playing and oftentimes practised for six to ten hours a day. Soon after Josh began performing for his family in their living room, he became the "go to guy" for any local blues gig.

After three years of playing, Josh was discovered by producer Johnny Sandlin. Josh was sent to Decatur, AL to become Johnny's in house session guitar player. Together they worked on music for Bonnie Bramlett, Highly Kind, and other roots artists. Upon his return to California, Josh was chosen over 4000 other guitar players to reach the national finals of Guitar Center's King Of The Blues contest. The night of the competition, Josh met rock photographer/manager, Robert M. Knight. Shortly after meeting, Robert began managing Josh and within 6 months of working together, Josh was touring with Japanese superstar Koshi Inaba of B'z. Josh has since then, recorded with producers Ross Hogarth and Don Gehman, toured with blues artist Beth Hart, and currently plays lead guitar for Shania Twain.

He plays acoustic, slide and electric guitar, and spans many genres from blues and country, to rock and funk.

== Discography ==
=== 2011 ===
- "Stroll On" feat. Beth Hart (produced by Ross Hogarth)

=== 2013 ===
- "Wake N Bake" feat. Joshua Ray by Mickey Shiloh (produced by Joshua Ray, Cameron Tyler and Willy Beaman)
