= Shim (band) =

Australian rock band

- Origin: Sydney, Australia
- Genres: Hard rock; blues rock
- Years active: 2018–present
- Label: BDF
- Members: Shimon Moore; Keynon; POW!; Jayme Lewis

Shim is a hard rock band fronted by former Sick Puppies lead vocalist Shimon Moore. The band formed after Moore's departure from Sick Puppies which he fronted from 1997 to 2014. On 16 May 2018, the band released their debut single "Hallelujah". Following the single, they made a debut performance at Rock on the Range on 20 May 2018. On 14 September 2018, the band released their eponymous debut album, SHIM. Moore described the record as "definitely a solo record" when interviewed by Loudwire stating that most of the material was produced in his bedroom. On 9 April 2020 Shim had his first stream on Twitch as the Hollywood Rebellion.

== Band members ==
- Shimon Moore – lead vocals, rhythm guitar
- POW! – lead guitar
- Jayme Lewis – bass, backing vocals
- Keynon – drums, percussion

== Discography ==
=== Studio albums ===
Title	Details
SHIM	Released: 14 September 2018; Label: BDF

=== Singles ===
Title	Year	Peak chart positions	Album
Title	Year	US Main. Rock	Album
"Hallelujah"	2018	27	Shim
"A Brand New War"	2018	—	Shim
"Broken Men"	2018	—	Shim
"Crucified"	2019	26	Shim

=== Music videos ===
Title	Year	Director(s)	Ref.
"Hallelujah"	2018	Brady Tulk	
"Crucified"	2019	Robyn August	
