= Selkie (film) =

2000 Australian fantasy film

- Promotional poster
- Directed by: Donald Crombie
- Screenplay by: Rob George
- Story by: Kate Fawkes; David Marlow
- Produced by: Jane Ballantyne; Rob George
- Starring: Shimon Moore; Chelsea Bruland; Mariana Rego; Bryan Marshall
- Cinematography: David Foreman
- Edited by: Edward McQueen-Mason
- Music by: Sean Timms
- Distributed by: United International Pictures
- Release date: 6 April 2000
- Running time: 88 minutes
- Country: Australia
- Language: English
- Box office: A$371,198 (Australia)

Selkie is a 2000 Australian family fantasy film. It features Sick Puppies lead singer Shimon Moore.

== Plot ==
Jamie (Shimon Moore) is a typical teenager living the good life: a popular lad, he has a part-time job, is on the football team and is the lead guitarist in a rock band. But all this is threatened when his mum (Celine O'Leary) announces that she has a new job as head scientist at a marine research base.

Forced to uproot and move to a remote island, Jamie soon discovers that all is not as it seems. He begins to notice changes to his body – scales and webbed fingers – things beyond the explanation of teenage changes. Changes which suggest that he is somehow connected to a legendary line of selkies – a magical people from ancient Scotland who have the power to change into seals.

== Cast ==
- Shimon Moore as Jamie Duncan
- Chelsea Bruland as Samantha
- Mariana Rego as Alison Duncan
- Bryan Marshall as Malcolm
- Celine O'Leary as Dr. Iona Duncan
- Elspeth Ballantyne as Loopy Laura
- Michael Habib as Tony Delmarco
- Edmund Pegge as Gordon Harris

== Production ==
It was set and shot in South Australia including Port Noarlunga South beach ("South Port"). The fishing harbor location was filmed at Granite Island off Victor Harbor in South Australia which is about fifty kilometers further south of Port Noarlunga or about one hour's drive from the state's capital city of Adelaide. The Australian sea lions were used for the seal forms, along with the being done by Anifex and the dogs were trained by Jason Hurr. The visual effects were done by Rising Sun Pictures.
