= Mark Goodwin (musician) =

American drummer

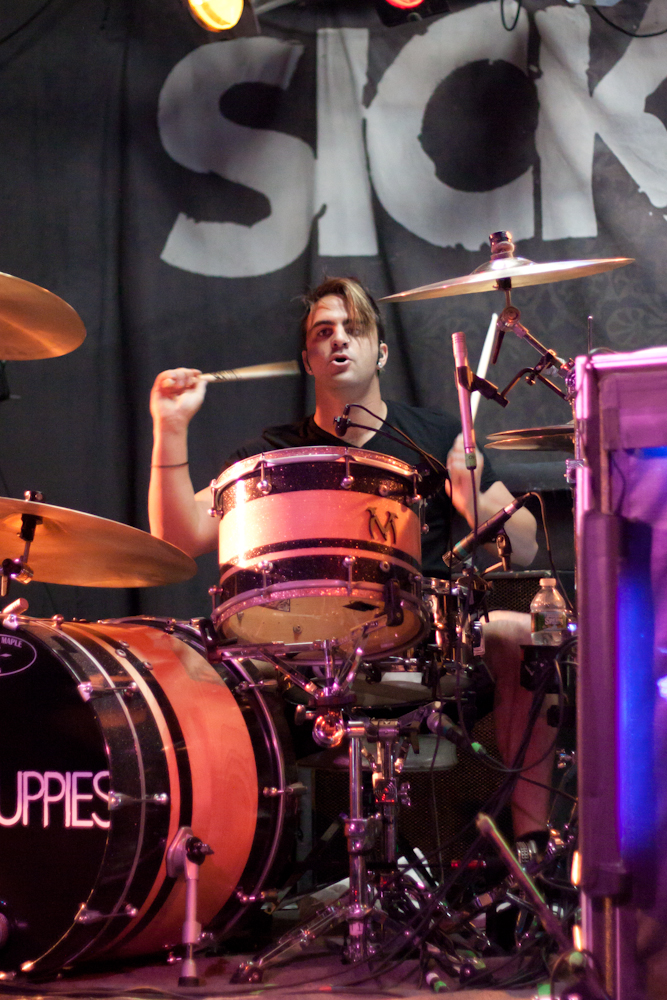
- Goodwin performing with Sick Puppies in 2010.

Background information
- Born: July 17, 1984 (age 40); Orange County, California, U.S.
- Genres: Alternative metal; post-grunge; nu metal
- Occupation: Drummer
- Years active: 2003–present
- Labels: Virgin; EMI; Capitol; DrillDown Entertainment Group LLC
- Member of: Sick Puppies
- Website: sickpuppies.com

Mark Goodwin (born July 17, 1984) is an American drummer. He is best known as the drummer for the Australian rock band Sick Puppies.

== Biography ==
Goodwin grew up in Orange County in California and started playing the drums when he was 12 years old. As he never took drumming lessons, he watched as many drummers as he could and listened to music and drums constantly. Before moving to Los Angeles after high school, he played drums in several local bands.

== Musical career ==
=== Sick Puppies (2003–present) ===
Mark joined Sick Puppies in 2003 after their drummer, Chris Mileski left the band prior to Sick Puppies moving to the United States. He met Sick Puppies in Los Angeles through a classified ad and was asked to join the band. He has been the drummer of Sick Puppies since 2003, writing lyrics to a few tracks off their albums since Connect, and occasionally provides backup vocals.

== Artistry ==
=== Influences ===
In his music career, Goodwin stated he was influenced by a lot of 90's rock and post-grunge music. He named Foo Fighters, Rage Against the Machine, and Green Day as some of the many bands he was influenced by.

== Discography ==
=== Sick Puppies ===
- Headphone Injuries (2006)
- Sick Puppies EP (2006)
- Dressed Up as Life (2007)
- Tri-Polar (2009)
- Live & Unplugged (2010)
- Polar Opposite (2011)
- Connect (2013)
- Fury (2016)
