= Dog's Breakfast =

Dog's Breakfast or A Dog's Breakfast may refer to:

== Film and television ==
- A Dog's Breakfast, a 2006 Canadian film
- "A Dog's Breakfast", a 2016 episode of the TV series Limitless
- "Dog's Breakfast", a 1997 episode of the TV series Duggan

== Music ==
- Dog's Breakfast, a 1999 EP by Sick Puppies
- "A Dog's Breakfast", a song by Tourniquet from the 1991 album Psycho Surgery
- "New Breed"/"Dog's Breakfast", a 1986 single by The Mackenzies

== Other uses ==
- Dog's Breakfast, a former furniture company owned by Jan Cameron
