= Welcome to the Real World =

Welcome to the Real World may refer to:

- Welcome to the Real World (Mr. Mister album), 1985
- Welcome to the Real World (Sick Puppies album), 2001
- Welcome to the Real World (Trapeze album), 1993
- "Welcome to the Real World", song by Jane Child from her album Jane Child
