= Stick to Your Guns =

Stick to Your Guns may refer to:

- Stick to Your Guns (film), a 1941 Western film
- Stick to Your Guns (band), an American hardcore punk band
- "Stick to Your Guns" (song), a song by Sick Puppies
- "Stick to Your Guns", a 1981 song by Dokken from the album Breaking the Chains
- "Stick to Your Guns", a 1981 song by Mötley Crüe from the album Too Fast for Love
- "Stick to Your Guns", a 1988 song by Bon Jovi from the album New Jersey
- "Stick to Your Guns", a 2012 song by The Orchard written by The Stellas
- "Stick to Your Guns", a 2016 song by George Watsky from the album x Infinity
