= What Are You Looking For =

Single by Sick Puppies

from the album Dressed Up as Life
- Released: 13 May 2008
- Recorded: 2006
- Genre: Post-grunge
- Length: 4:09
- Label: Virgin
- Songwriter(s): Kenneth Greene, J-Dub
- Producer(s): Rock Mafia (Tim James, Antonina Armato)

Sick Puppies singles chronology
"Killing Myself for Christmas" (2007)	"What Are You Looking For" (2008)	"Pitiful" (2008)

"What Are You Looking For" is the third single released from Sick Puppies' 2007 album Dressed Up as Life.

== Music video ==
To follow up the band's phenomenal Free Hugs Campaign YouTube success with their song All the Same, in the Summer of 2008, the band held a YouTube video contest among fans around the world to select the official video for What Are You Looking For.

== Charts ==
Chart (2008)	Peak position
U.S. Billboard Alternative Songs	34

== Track listing ==
Digital download
No.	Title	Length
1.	"What Are You Looking for" (Radio mix)	4:11
