= Fury (Sick Puppies album) =

Studio album by Sick Puppies
- Released: 20 May 2016 (CD)
- Recorded: 2015
- Genre: Alternative metal; nu metal; hard rock; post-grunge
- Length: 37:20
- Label: DrillDown Entertainment Group LLC
- Producer: Mark Holman

Sick Puppies chronology
Connect (2013)	Fury (2016)	Wave The Bull (2025)

Singles from Fury
- 1. "Stick to Your Guns" Released: 31 March 2016; 2. "Where Do I Begin" Released: 12 August 2016

Fury is the fifth studio album by the Australian rock band Sick Puppies. Released on 20 May 2016, through DrillDown Entertainment Group LLC, it is the band's first album with new vocalist Bryan Scott, who replaced original vocalist Shimon Moore. The lead single "Stick to Your Guns" was released on 31 March 2016. The album cover was revealed on 15 April 2016. Pre-orders for the album began on 22 April 2016.

Professional ratings
Review scores
Source	Rating
Cryptic Rock	5/5 stars

== Track listing ==
All tracks are written by Emma Anzai, Mark Goodwin, and Bryan Scott, except where noted.

Standard
No.	Title	Writer(s)	Length
1.	"Black and Blue"		3:11
2.	"Stick to Your Guns"		3:18
3.	"Let Me Live"		3:32
4.	"Where Do I Begin"		3:34
5.	"Just the Beginning"	Anzai; Goodwin; Scott; Lee Miles Buchanan	3:13
6.	"Walls (You Changed)"	Anzai; Aaron Edwards	3:17
7.	"Killing Time"		3:09
8.	"Earth to You"	Anzai; Goodwin; Scott; Buchanan	3:09
9.	"Beautiful Chaos"	Anzai; Goodwin; Scott; Buchanan	3:23
10.	"If I Stay"		3:21
11.	"Here with You"	Anzai; Scott; Scott Stevens	3:33
Total length:			37:20

Best Buy bonus tracks
No.	Title	Length
12.	"Charlatan"	3:13
13.	"Not Now"	3:17
Total length:		43:50

== Personnel ==
Sick Puppies

- Bryan Scott – guitars, lead vocals
- Emma Anzai – bass, backing vocals, lead vocals on "Walls (You Changed)"
- Mark Goodwin – drums

== Charts ==
Chart (2016)	Peak position
US Billboard 200	92
US Top Alternative Albums (Billboard)	10
US Top Rock Albums (Billboard)	13
