= Lost in Woonsocket =

- Directed by: John Chester
- Produced by: Brian Altounian (consulting producer); John Chester (executive producer); Capella Fahoome; Joy Kecken (consulting producer); Jim Lefter; Thea Maichle (associate producer); Malcolm McLean (field producer); Andre Miller (executive producer); Molly Schreck David Riordan (executive producer)
- Starring: Mark; Normand; John Chester; Andre Miller; Jim Lefter; Capella Fahoome; Molly Schreckengost
- Cinematography: Cucillo Consad (director of photography); Roy Heisler; Carmine Falzarano; Malcolm McLean
- Edited by: Angie Edinger; Amy Wilson; John Chester
- Release date: 2007
- Running time: 81 minutes
- Country: United States
- Language: English

Lost in Woonsocket is a documentary feature film directed by John Chester. It stars Chester and Andre Miller, co-creators of the A&E Network documentary series Random 1, from which the film draws much of its content. It concerns Mark and Normand, characters featured in episodes 4 and 10 of Random 1's single season, and their attempts to stay sober after being brought out of destitution by Chester, Miller, and the Random 1 organization. Though Random 1 was not renewed after its season finale, Chester and Miller continued filming Mark and Normand in their hometown of Woonsocket, Rhode Island, and this new footage makes up the final third of the film.

It premiered at the South by Southwest film festival in 2007.
