= Stick to Your Guns (song) =

Single by Sick Puppies

from the album Fury
- Released: 31 March 2016
- Recorded: 2015–2016
- Length: 3:18
- Label: DrillDown Entertainment Group LLC
- Songwriters: Bryan Scott, Emma Anzai and Mark Holman
- Producer: Mark Holman

Sick Puppies singles chronology
| "Connect" (2014) | "Stick to Your Guns" (2016) |

"Stick to Your Guns" is the first single from Sick Puppies' fifth album Fury. It was released on 31 March 2016 through DrillDown Entertainment Group LLC. It is the first single to feature Bryan Scott on vocals and guitars.

== Music video ==
A lyric video was released on 31 March 2016. A music video was released and premiered on May 18, 2016 on Loudwire's website. The music video was directed by Nathan Cox.

== Chart performance ==
| Chart (2016) | Peak position |
|---|---|
| US Mainstream Rock (Billboard) | 13 |
| US Rock & Alternative Airplay (Billboard) | 49 |
