= Samantha Hess =

American professional cuddler

Samantha Hess (born 1983) is an American former professional cuddler and author. Her business, Cuddle Up to Me, gained national attention when she appeared on America's Got Talent in 2015.

== Career ==
Hess worked as a personal trainer. She set up a cuddling business after watching a Free Hugs Campaign social experiment video of two men offering hugs, one for free and the other for money. She learned of other groups in New York City who ran identical businesses and was inspired to pursue it as a career. She was divorced and missed platonic cuddling between friends, which she wanted without having to enter a full relationship. As a sufferer from chronic back pain she found cuddling therapeutic and relieving.

When she applied for a business license, authorities thought cuddling was a cover for prostitution. In an interview with CNBC, she spoke about advances made by her clients and would-be clients, with Hess saying she received "plenty of inappropriate emails" and even three marriage proposals. Her clients are mostly people with disabilities or who suffer from traumatic stress.

In late 2014, Hess opened a professional cuddling shop. She attracted 10,000 customers in the first week. The following year, she staged a 12-hour cuddling convention.

In August 2022, she announced her choice to end her service as a professional cuddler.

== America's Got Talent ==
In May 2015, Hess appeared as a 10th season contestant for NBC's America's Got Talent. In her audition, she cuddled Nick Cannon using the techniques "The Cleopatra," "The Claw," and "Mother of Pearl". Howard Stern buzzed the act. After the audition, the judges formed a pile on top of Cannon on the couch. Although Stern voted "No," Heidi Klum, Mel B, and Howie Mandel voted "Yes," sending her to the Judge Cuts Week round.

In July 2015, during Judge Cuts Week 1, she cuddled guest judge Neil Patrick Harris with techniques called "The Fortune Cookie," "The Sidewinder," and "The Romeo". Stern, Klum, Mel B, and Mandel buzzed her, eliminating her from the competition. She was not in the scene with the judges discussing her as she had four "X"s. She was the first contestant in season ten to receive all "X"s during Judge Cuts Week.

== Bibliography ==
- Touch: The Power of Human Connection. Fulcrum Solutions LLC. 2014. ISBN 978-0-991-51540-0.
