= John Chester =

American filmmaker

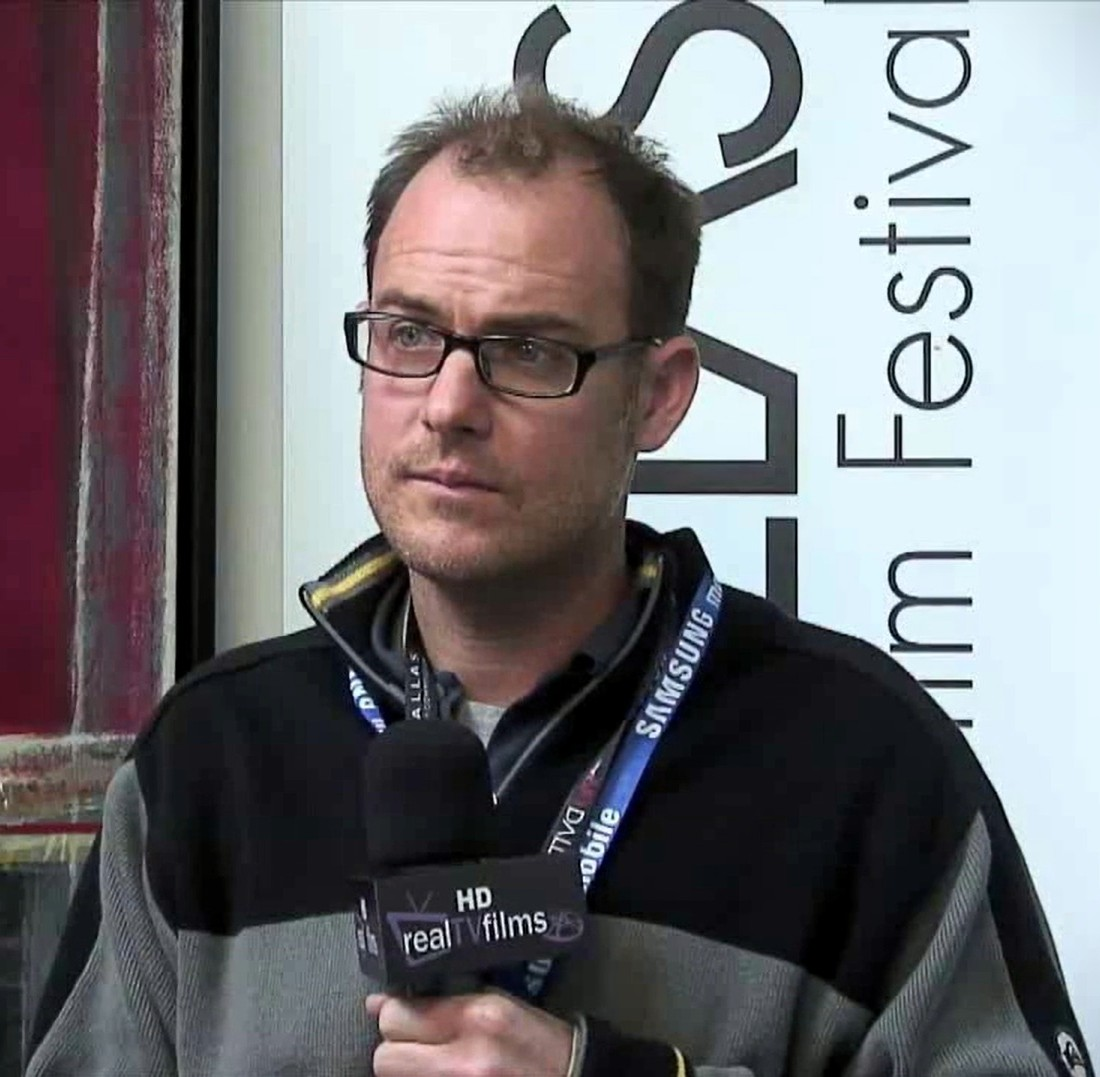
Chester in 2009

John Chester is an American filmmaker and television director.

== Early life ==
Chester grew up in Ocean City, Maryland, and graduated in 1990 from Stephen Decatur High School (Maryland).

== Work ==
Chester's first primetime television docu-series aired on A&E, Random 1, which he directed and starred in in 2006. The series inspired his feature documentary Lost in Woonsocket which premiered at SXSW in 2007. Chester also directed the documentary Rock Prophecies, about the rock photographer Robert M. Knight.

His project The Biggest Little Farm is a feature-length film that chronicles the 7-year story of Apricot Lane Farms, the regenerative farm he and his wife Molly started in 2011. The film premiered at the 2018 Telluride Film Festival and Toronto International Film Festival and 2019 Sundance Film Festival, and releases May 2019 in theaters nationwide. In 2018, Chester began a 3-year book deal with publisher Feiwel & Friends/Macmillan for a spin-off children's book series featuring characters from the film, of which the first installment Saving Emma the Pig was scheduled for release in 2019 and listed on Amazon.Com as a Hardcover publication for May 14, 2019.

== Filmography ==
- 2018 The Biggest Little Farm – Director, writer, producer, himself.
- Super Soul Sunday – Director. Shorts
- Rock Prophecies – Director.
- Random 1 – Director.
- Lost in Woonsocket – Director.
- Jockeys – Director.

== Awards ==
- 2018 Emmy Award Special Class – Outstanding Writing "The Orphan"
