= There's No Going Back =

Single by Sick Puppies

from the album Connect
- Released: 20 May 2013
- Recorded: 2013
- Genre: Alternative rock; post-grunge
- Length: 3:22
- Label: Virgin
- Songwriters: Desmond Child; Tim Price; Emma Anzai; Shimon Moore; Antonina Armato
- Producers: Rock Mafia; Tim James; Antonina Armato

Sick Puppies singles chronology
"Riptide" (2010)	"There's No Going Back" (2013)	"Gunfight" (2013)

"There's No Going Back" is a song by Australian rock band Sick Puppies, released as the lead single from their fourth studio album Connect.

== Music video ==
The band is shown performing in the desert along with ghost version of themselves. The later part of the video recreates the cover of the band's album Connect where their ghost versions are being hoisted in the air while holding an umbrella.

== Charts ==
=== Weekly charts ===
Weekly chart performance for "There's No Going Back"
Chart (2011)	Peak position
US Hot Rock & Alternative Songs (Billboard)	43
US Rock & Alternative Airplay (Billboard)	16

=== Year-end charts ===
Year-end chart performance for "There's No Going Back"
Chart (2013)	Position
US Rock Airplay (Billboard)	48
