= Welcome to the Real World (Sick Puppies album) =

Studio album by Sick Puppies
- Released: 3 September 2001
- Recorded: 2000–2001
- Genre: Nu metal; rap metal; alternative metal
- Length: 54:15
- Label: Transistor Music; CCBK7045

Sick Puppies chronology
Dog's Breakfast (1999)	Welcome to the Real World (2001)	Fly (2003)

Singles from Welcome to the Real Word
- 1. "Nothing Really Matters" Released: 2000; 2. "Every Day" Released: 30 April 2001; 3. "Rock Kids" Released: 30 July 2001

Professional ratings
Review scores
Source	Rating
Sputnikmusic	1.5/5 stars

Welcome to the Real World is the debut studio album by the Australian rock band, Sick Puppies. The album was released only in Australia on 3 September 2001 as an enhanced CD with the "Every Day" music video included. The album's 3,000 copies that were pressed were only sold in Australia, making it very valuable – and only available – on the second-hand market. The album was released with the "Every Day" single on some pressings. This is the band's only studio album to feature Chris Mileski on drums.

== Pre-release ==
The band entered the Triple J Unearthed band competition in 2000 with a demo of their song, "Nothing Really Matters", and went on to co-win the Sydney-region along with Blue and Ariels.Spans.Earth. which led to a management deal with Paul Stepanek Management. This deal enabled the band to release the full album of Welcome to the Real World. Along with "Nothing Really Matters", two other singles were released before the full album was made available; "Every Day" and "Rock Kids".

== Music videos ==
Two music videos were produced for this album, the first being for the demo version of "Nothing Really Matters", which was released in 2000, and the other being for "Every Day", which was released with the album.

The music video for "Nothing Really Matters" is composed of live footage from 2000 of the band playing in Sydney. The music video for "Every Day", on the other hand, shows the band playing in an old hallway, with cuts to the band members dressed in different occupational attires such as a clown, an astronaut, a boxer and a policeman, with other shots of them dressed in straight jackets.

== US release ==
Welcome to the Real World was released in the United States in early 2016. With no official word from the band, the record was added to the Apple Music iTunes store. Single releases for Rock Kids and Every Day also appeared for purchase. This came after the departure of vocalist/guitarist Shimon Moore and on the heel of their record, Fury, with new vocalist Bryan Scott.

== Track listing ==
All tracks are written by Shimon Moore, Emma Anzai and Chris Mileski

Welcome to the Real World track listing
No.	Title	Length
1.	"Welcome to the Real World"	2:44
2.	"Rock Kids"	4:12
3.	"Duck Bite"	3:45
4.	"Every Day"	5:18
5.	"Time Will Pass"	4:06
6.	"Nothing Really Matters"	4:39
7.	"Open the Door"	3:06
8.	"Holding Out"	3:58
9.	"Something Different"	3:48
10.	"Do You Know"	3:24
11.	"Me Much Plenty"	3:01
12.	"The Way"	3:58
13.	"Rock Kids" (radio edit; contains hidden track "Spanky & Speedy", which begins at 5:47)	7:13

Bonus "Every Day" single disc
No.	Title	Length
1.	"Every Day" (single version)	3:09
2.	"Every Day" (album version)	5:18
3.	"Nothing Really Matters" (intro to "Open the Door" cut out)	4:37

== Outtakes ==
The album was initially supposed to feature a humorous cover version of Destiny's Child's hit single "Say My Name", characterised by turntable samples and heavy Flea-esque bass lines. The song "Brain Stew" by Green Day is used as background music. The cover contains additional lyrics with coarse language; for example, the chorus invariably ends with "You're acting kinda shady, ain't callin' me baby/So what the fuck?". The song, however, was not included due to the threat of a lawsuit by Destiny's Child's record label. The cover was later leaked on the internet and is regularly played at Sick Puppies' concerts.

== Personnel ==
- Shim Moore – lead vocals, guitar
- Emma Anzai – bass guitar, backing vocals
- Chris Mileski – drums
