= Dressed Up as Life =

Studio album by Sick Puppies
- Released: 3 April 2007
- Studio: Rock Mafia (Santa Monica, California); Vibatorium (Woodland Hills, California)
- Genre: Alternative metal; post-grunge; hard rock
- Length: 45:33
- Label: Virgin
- Producer: Rock Mafia (Tim James, Antonina Armato)

Sick Puppies chronology
Sick Puppies EP (2006)	Dressed Up as Life (2007)	Tri-Polar (2009)

Professional ratings
Review scores
Source	Rating
AllMusic	3/5 stars
Type 3 Media	8.5/10 stars
IGN Music	7.7/10 stars

Dressed Up as Life is the second studio album by the Australian rock band Sick Puppies, released on 3 April 2007 through Virgin Records. It was their first album to be released in the US, peaking at No. 181 on the US Billboard 200 chart. Deutsch Advertising creatives Michael Leibowitz and Eric Rojas oversaw the CD design for Dressed Up as Life.

This is the band's first studio album with drummer Mark Goodwin, who replaced Chris Mileski in 2003.

== Track listing ==
All tracks are written by Shimon Moore, Emma Anzai, Antonina Armato, and Tim James, except where noted.

No.	Title	Writer(s)	Length
1.	"My World"		4:00
2.	"Pitiful"		3:44
3.	"Cancer"	Moore; Anzai; Armato; James; Brett Creswell	3:05
4.	"What Are You Looking For"		4:09
5.	"Deliverance"	Moore; Anzai; Creswell	3:12
6.	"All the Same"		4:18
7.	"Too Many Words"		3:21
8.	"Howard's Tale"	Moore; Anzai	4:12
9.	"Asshole Father"		3:00
10.	"Issues"		4:00
11.	"Anywhere but Here"	Moore; Anzai; Armato; James; Refayat Ali	3:59
12.	"The Bottom"	Moore; Anzai; Armato; James; Creswell	4:37
Total length:			45:33

=== Outtakes ===
- "Pathogen" (3:03)
- "Shards" (3:43)

== Personnel ==
Sick Puppies

- Shim Moore – lead vocals, guitars
- Emma Anzai – bass, backing vocals
- Mark Goodwin – drums

== Charts ==
=== Album ===
Chart performance for Dressed Up as Life
Chart (2007)	Peak position
Australian Albums (ARIA)	62
US Billboard 200	181
US Billboard Top Heatseekers	4

=== Singles ===
Chart performance for promotional singles from Dressed Up as Life
Year	Song	Peak positions	
Year	Song	US Modern Rock	US Mainstream Rock
2006	"All the Same"	8	36
2007	"My World	20	—
