= Gunfight (song) =

Single by Sick Puppies

from the album Connect
- Released: 13 October 2013
- Recorded: 2013
- Genre: Alternative metal; hard rock
- Length: 2:55
- Label: Virgin
- Songwriter(s): Tim Price; Emma Anzai; Shimon Moore; Antonina Armato
- Producer(s): Rock Mafia; Tim James; Antonina Armato

Sick Puppies singles chronology
"There's No Going Back" (2013)	"Gunfight" (2013)	"Die to Save You" (2014)

"Gunfight" is the second single from Sick Puppies' fourth album Connect.

The song makes references to the colonization of the Western United States and Americas as a whole, congressional corruption in the United States, and the Tiananmen Square Massacre along with Tank Man.

== Charts ==
Chart (2011)	Peak position
US Billboard Mainstream Rock	15
