= Free Hugs Campaign =

Social movement

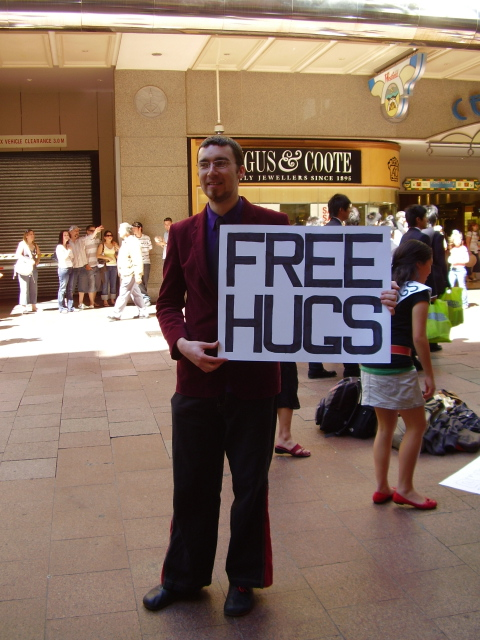
Juan Mann, who started the Free Hugs movement, seen at Pitt Street Mall, Sydney, Australia, 2006

The Free Hugs Campaign is a social movement involving individuals who offer hugs to strangers in public places. The hugs are meant to be random acts of kindness—selfless acts performed just to make others feel better. Individuals participating in the campaign are sometimes referred to simply as huggers and may also refer to themselves by that term. International Free Hugs Month is celebrated on the first Saturday of July and continues until August first.

The campaign in its present form was started in 2004 by an Australian man known only by the pseudonym "Juan Mann". The campaign became famous internationally in 2006 as the result of a music video on YouTube for the song "All The Same" by Australian band Sick Puppies.

== History ==
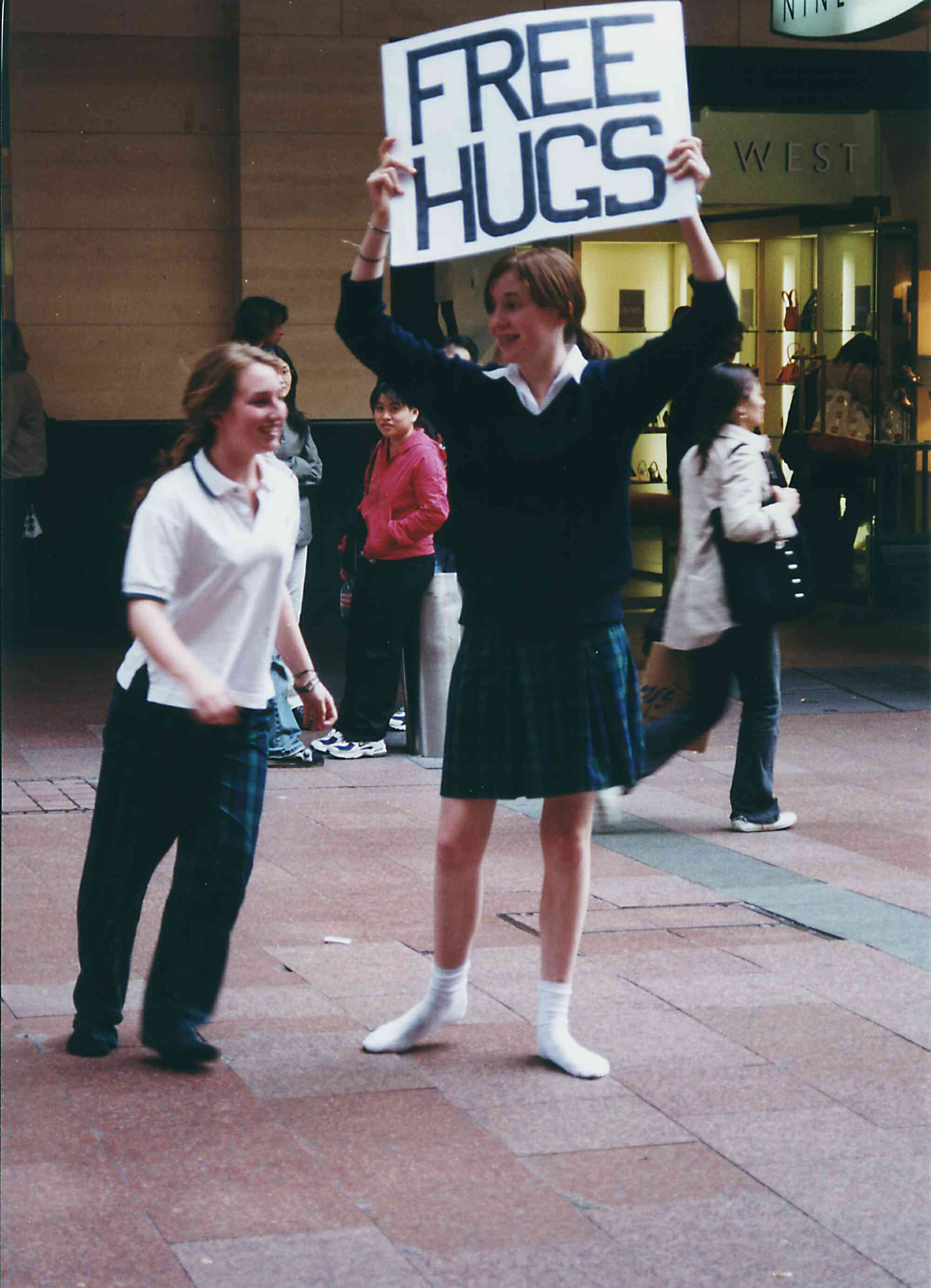
A person holding up a "Free Hugs" sign in Sydney, Australia, in 2004

Free hugs signs were commonly seen at Phish shows at least as early as 1996.

The Free Hugs campaign in its present form was started by Juan Mann on 30 June 2004, when he began giving out hugs in the Pitt Street Mall in central Sydney. In the months prior to this, Mann had been feeling depressed and lonely as a result of numerous personal difficulties. However, a random hug from a stranger made an enormous difference, with Mann stating that "...I went out to a party one night and a completely random person came up to me and gave me a hug. I felt like a king! It was greatest thing that ever happened." Mann carried the now iconic "FREE HUGS" sign from the outset. On his first attempt in his hometown, he had to wait fifteen minutes before an elderly lady came up to him and gave him a hug.

Initial distrust of Mann's motives eventually gave way to a gradual increase of people willing to be hugged, with other huggers (male and female) helping distribute them. In October 2005, police told them that they must stop, as Mann had not obtained public liability insurance worth $25 million for his actions. Mann and his companions used a petition to attempt to convince authorities that his campaign should be allowed to continue without the insurance. His petition reached 10,000 signatures. He submitted it and was allowed to continue his campaign.

Mann befriended Shimon Moore, then-lead singer for Sick Puppies, shortly after commencing his campaign. In late 2005, Moore recorded video footage of Mann and his fellow huggers. Moore and his band moved to Los Angeles in March 2005 and nothing was immediately done with the footage. Meanwhile, Mann continued his campaign throughout 2005 and 2006 by appearing in Pitt Street Mall in Sydney most Thursday afternoons. In mid-2006 Mann's grandmother died, and in consolation Moore made the music video using the footage he had shot in 2004 to send to Mann as a gift, stating in an interview that, "I sent it to him on a disc as a present and I wrote down 'This is who you are'." The video was later uploaded onto YouTube and became popular.

On 30 October 2006, Mann was invited by Oprah Winfrey to appear on her show Oprah. Mann made an appearance outside her studio that morning, offering free hugs to the crowd waiting to see the taping of that day's episode. The show's camera crews caught several people in the audience hugging Mann as the morning progressed. On 23 October 2007, Mann announced his residential address online and offered an open invitation to anyone to come over and chat on-camera as part of his 'open-house project'. Mann hosted 80 guests over 36 days. On 25 November 2007, Mann's landlord threatened him with eviction, so he launched an online appeal. On 25 December 2007, Mann published an e-book as a free download. A website, www.freehugscampaign.org, was launched in mid-2007. The website enables those involved in the campaign to better organize themselves and coordinate their efforts. On the website's forum, those involved in the campaign called for an annual International Free Hugs Day. Mann declared that the day would fall on the first Saturday following 30 June each year; this being the first date that Mann ever offered free hugs in Pitt Street Mall, Sydney in 2004. The first International Free Hugs Day was 7 July 2007. Mann's Official Blog remained dormant after his apparent retirement but has been updated at times; it proclaims itself as the "true home" of the Free Hugs Campaign and has hosted interviews conducted with individuals holding Free Hugs Campaigns internationally. On 22 November 2008, Sick Puppies did a performance of "All the Same" at YouTube Live while Mann gave hugs to crowd members.

== Publicity and expansion ==
=== 2000s ===
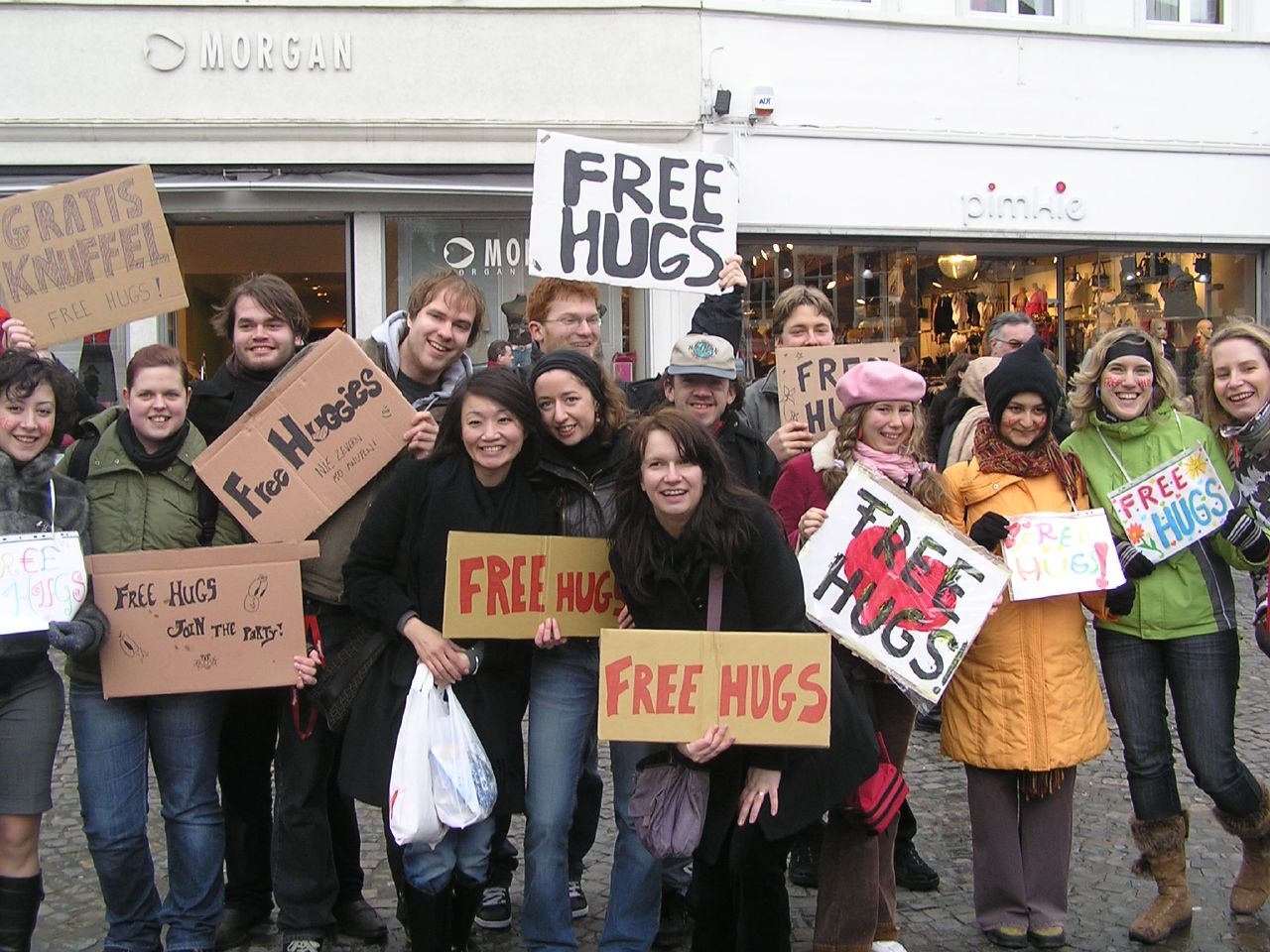
Free hugs campaign in Belgium, 2008

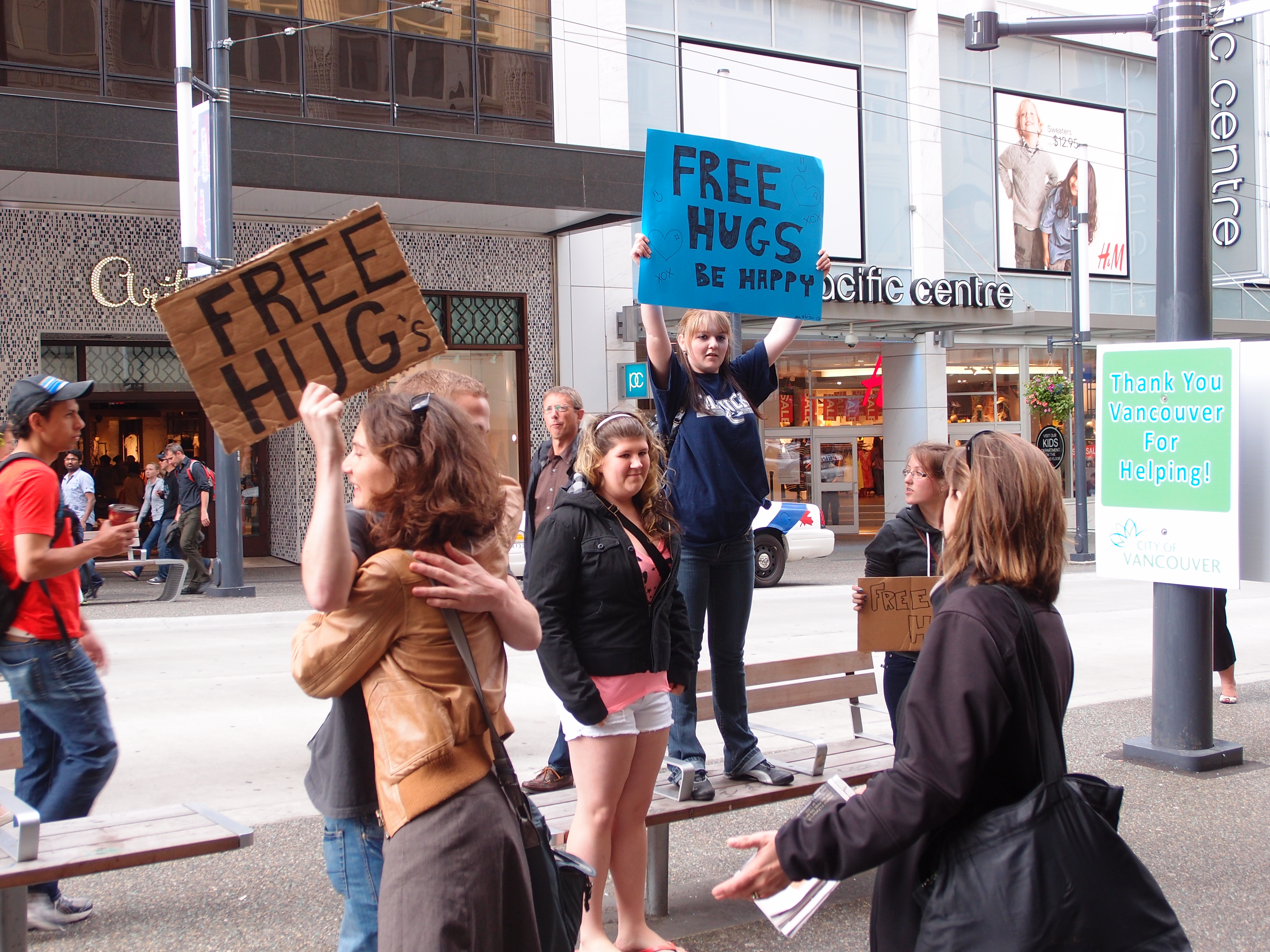
Free hugs campaign in Vancouver, Canada, 2011

In late 2006, various Free Hugs campaigns were held around the world, such as Taipei, Singapore,, Tel Aviv, Italy, Geneva, and Belgian cities of Antwerp and Ghent. On 6 November 2006, a group of eleven people led by a 24-year-old man named 'Baigu' (白骨) held the campaign in Shanghai, only to be detained for one hour for not having a permit to hold a gathering in a public place. Campaigns were also in US cities of St. Louis and Boulder.

In March 2007, as part of an initiative to combat discrimination against people infected with HIV, the French Government called on its citizens to embrace strangers who hoisted signs in the street offering free hugs. This campaign included public service announcements broadcast on television. On 20 December 2008, Indian composer A. R. Rahman and percussionist Sivamani created a song titled "Jiya Se Jiya", inspired by the Free Hugs Campaign and promoted it through a video shot in various cities in India. In 2009, there were campaigns held in Toronto, Canada and Steinkjer, Norway.

=== 2010s ===
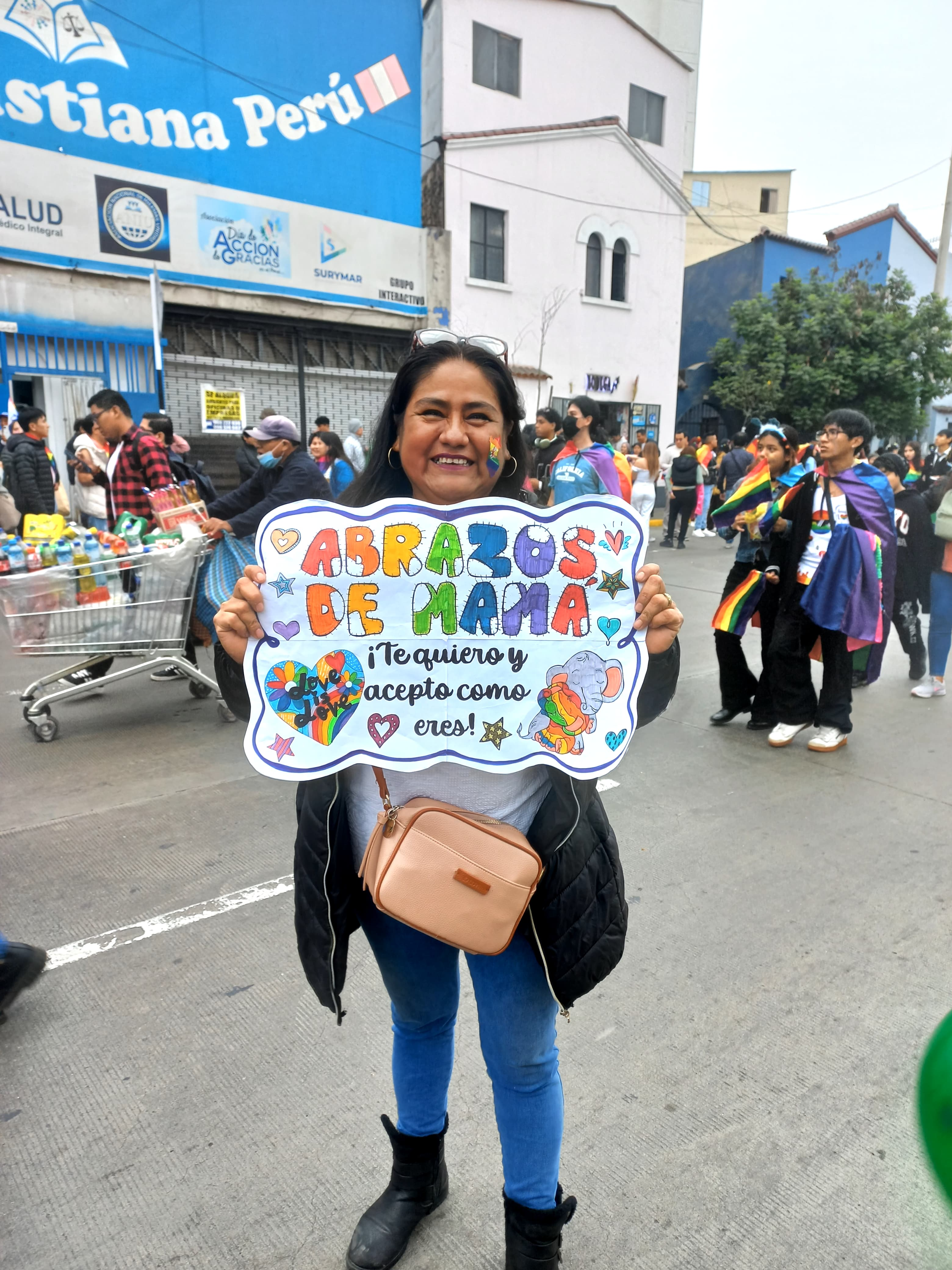
Free mom hugs, Lima, Peru, 2024

On 3 July 2010, a "FREE HUGS Campaign for AIDS" was organized by a non-profit organization at six different places in Chennai, India. In September 2012, a Polish traveler, Maksym Skorubski went for a trip "Hugs Around The World in 80 days", during which he gave out free hugs to 6,783 people in 19 countries around the world. His tour was nominated by National Geographic Traveler as the best journey of 2012.

In early 2013, a group under the name 'Free Hugs Vienna' organized several 'free hugs' events in Vienna, Austria and abroad. The group also held a campaign to support Conchita Wurst's Eurovision Song Contest 2014 campaign. From 2015 to 2019, in the month of May, members of the “Free Hugs Vienna” team were active during the Eurovision Song Contest week in Vienna (2015), Stockholm (2016), Kyiv (2017), Lisbon (2018) and Tel-Aviv (2019). The “free huggers” connected with members of the international press, fans and other guests in the Eurovision Press Center, Euro Fan Café and in front of the Eurovision arena on the days of the semi-finals and final.

In Riyadh, Saudi Arabia, two men were arrested by the Commission for the Promotion of Virtue and Prevention of Vice for offering free hugs in a public space in November 2013. The move was criticized on Twitter; however, others opposed the campaign altogether.

In 2014 and 2016, photos of a Black child, Devonte Hart, went viral when he was photographed with "free hugs" signs during events around the Ferguson unrest in Ferguson, Missouri, and at protests following the shooting of Keith Lamont Scott in Charlotte, North Carolina. He was also photographed embracing a police officer in riot gear during a 2014 protest in Portland, Oregon. The image became known as the "hug felt 'round the world," and was widely circulated on social media. In March 2018, the photographer who was one of the adoptive mothers of the child, and her wife, killed the boy and his siblings in a murder-suicide family annihilation.

== See also ==
- Samantha Hess
- Ken Nwadike Jr.
- Touch starvation
- Emotional isolation
