= The Biggest Little Farm =

The Biggest little Farm
- Theatrical release poster
- Directed by: John Chester
- Written by: John Chester; Mark Monroe
- Produced by: Sandra Keats; John Chester
- Starring: John Chester; Molly Chester
- Cinematography: John Chester; Benji Lanpher; Mallory Cunningham; Chris Martin; Kyle Romanek
- Edited by: Amy Overbeck
- Music by: Jeff Beal
- Production companies: LD Entertainment; FarmLore Films; Impact Partners; Artemis Rising Foundation
- Distributed by: Neon
- Release dates: August 28, 2018 (Telluride); May 10, 2019 (United States)
- Running time: 92 minutes
- Country: United States
- Language: English
- Box office: $6.5 million

The Biggest Little Farm is a 2018 American documentary film, directed by John Chester. The film profiles the life of John Chester and his wife, Molly, as they acquire and establish themselves on Apricot Lane Farms in Moorpark, California.

The film premiered on September 1, 2018, at the Telluride Film Festival. It had its second screening at the 2018 Toronto International Film Festival, where it was named second runner-up for the People's Choice Award: Documentaries. It was selected as the Opening Night film at Doc NYC in November 2018. The film was screened as part of the Spotlight Section at the 2019 Sundance Film Festival. It also screened at the 29th New Orleans Film Festival on October 24, 2018.

The film was acquired for theatrical distribution by the independent film company Neon, and was released on May 10, 2019 in Los Angeles and New York. The film expanded into Austin, Boston, Chicago, Dallas, Denver, Houston, Minneapolis, Nashville, Philadelphia, Phoenix, Portland, San Diego, San Francisco and Washington, D.C., on May 17 and additional markets throughout May and June. The film was acquired by The Exchange for international distribution.

A sequel special, The Biggest Little Farm: The Return, was released in 2022 on Disney+, and a sequel series premiered on YouTube on November 8, 2026.

== Synopsis ==
In 2010, married couple Molly and John Chester decide to leave their old lives in Los Angeles behind and purchase a 234-acre farm near Moorpark in neighboring Ventura County, California. Rechristening it "Apricot Lane Farms", the couple spends the next seven years transforming the arid landscape into a fully functional farm and biodiverse habitat for neighboring flora and fauna. They face hardship as the difficulties of keeping a farm running mount up, often resulting in frustration and anger, but also happiness at their harmonious relationship with nature.

== Reception ==
On review aggregator website Rotten Tomatoes, the film holds an approval rating of 91% based on 100 reviews with an average rating of 7.2/10. The site's critical consensus reads, "Uplifting, educational, and entertaining, The Biggest Little Farm is an environmental advocacy documentary with a satisfying side dish of hope for the future." On Metacritic, it holds a 74 out of 100 score (indicating "generally favorable reviews") based on 25 critics.

In his Variety review of the film, Peter DeBruge noted that it "feel[s] like fresh air for the soul.", and New York Times critic Glenn Kenny wrote "it may also revive your wonder at the weird but ultimately awe-inspiring ways in which humans can help nature do its work". Additionally, The Los Angeles Times's Robert Abele wrote that the film is a "lush tour of transformed land and photogenic fauna, is so appealing as a chronicle of dedicated do-gooders who actually did good (and shot every frame of it). [...] Watching the Chesters fight past disillusionment to learn the real lessons of harvesting in communion with nature is what gives the movie its rousing, illuminating power."

Several reviewers were critical of the film's lack of specifics on the initial investment and economics of the farm.

On December 4, 2019, the film's composer Jeff Beal conducted the Hollywood Chamber Orchestra, performing his score live in sync with the film at the Wiltern Theater in Los Angeles.

== Awards and nominations ==
A list of nominations and awards the film has received is as follows:

- Palm Springs International Film Festival – Audience Award for Best Documentary
- Toronto International Film Festival – Second runner-up for The Grolsch People's Choice Documentary Award
- Sundance Film Festival – Runner-up for the Festival Favorite Award
- American Film Institute Fest – Audience Award for Best Feature
- Boulder Film Festival – Grand Jury Prize for Feature Length Film
- Boulder Film Festival – Best Documentary
- Mill Valley Film Festival – Silver Audience Award for Valley of the Docs Presentation
- Hamptons International Film Festival – Audience Award for Best Documentary Feature
- Middleburg Film Festival – Audience Award for Best Documentary
- Annapolis Film Festival – Audience Award for Best Feature Documentary
- Gasparilla Film Festival – Grand Jury Prize for Best Feature Documentary
- Sedona Film Festival – Best of the Fest
- Sedona Film Festival – Director's Choice Award for Best Documentary
- 92nd Oscars Shortlist – Documentary Feature

== Distribution ==
The film is distributed by Energia in Latin America. It is currently available for streaming in Netflix Latin America as "Mi gran pequeña granja".
