= Random 1 =

Random 1 is a documentary-style reality television series that aired from November 2005 to January 2006 on the A&E cable network. In each episode, hosts John Chester and Andre Miller travel from town to town, in Miller's real-life, rickety pickup truck Jackie, searching for total strangers who are looking to have their lives changed. However, unlike other such "do-gooder" shows, Chester and Miller employ an all-shapes-and-sizes approach, with assignments ranging from a new cell phone to a week in rehab to a new prosthetic leg. The show ran for one season, and premiered to favorable reviews.

The crew abides by a set of rules: the person being helped must be a stranger, the mission must be completed in one day, and no money may be spent (as Chester explains in Episode 4, "Out Of The Woods", this is because money distances a philanthropist from the person they are trying to help. All three of these rules were eventually broken in the course of the season, however). In order to free up John and Andre to get to know the subject of a given episode, they are aided by three producers in an internet-ready mobile RV. Capella Fahoome, Jim Lefter, and Molly Schrek, once a subject has been decided on, go to their laptops and cell phones, searching for local businesses or individuals willing to help. Typically, the "street team" and the "RV team" do not interact except over the phone, although this policy, too, has had its exceptions.

As of May 24, 2007, there was no planned DVD release of the show itself, however, a feature film adaptation featuring Mark and Normand is touring the festival circuit, having premiered at South By Southwest. It combines footage from episodes 4 and 10, along with behind-the-scenes footage of the show, and new footage of Mark and Normand's post-Random 1 experiences. It is entitled Lost In Woonsocket.

== Cast ==
- John Chester (scout and co-founder)
- Andre Miller (scout and co-founder)
- Jim Lefter (producer)
- Capella Fahoome (producer)
- Molly Schrekengost (producer)
- Jackie (truck)

== Origins ==
The project began in 1996 when documentary filmmaker John Chester joined fitness trainer Andre Miller to seek out strangers for assistance; starting in 1999, the pair began documenting their experiences on film.

A&E began airing the group's efforts as a 10-episode series in November 2005.
