= Connect (Sick Puppies album) =

Studio album by Sick Puppies
- Released: 16 July 2013
- Genre: Alternative metal; hard rock; post-grunge; alternative rock
- Length: 44:10
- Label: Capitol
- Producer: Rock Mafia; Tim James; Antonina Armato

Sick Puppies chronology
Polar Opposite (2011)	Connect (2013)	Fury (2016)

Singles from Connect
- 1. "There's No Going Back" Released: 20 May 2013; 2. "Gunfight" Released: 13 October 2013; 3. "Die to Save You" Released: 29 April 2014; 4. "Connect" Released: 19 July 2014

Connect is the fourth studio album by Australian band Sick Puppies, released on 16 July 2013 by Capitol Records. This was the last album to feature lead vocalist and guitarist Shimon Moore prior to his dismissal on 20 October 2014.

The album debuted at No. 17 on the US Billboard 200 album chart, their highest charting position to date, with 18,195 copies sold. Connect sold 16,318 albums in its first week.

A preview of the first single "There's No Going Back" was released on YouTube on 10 May 2013. The single was released on 20 May 2013.

== Music ==
Stephen Thomas Erlewine of Allmusic highlighted that "the trio's fourth album, are varied and its themes are ambitious, tackling disconnect and politics", but it "doesn't mean the Australian trio necessarily sounds adult, however".

== Critical reception ==
Professional ratings
Review scores
Source	Rating
Allmusic	2.5/5 stars
Alternative Press	1.5/5 stars
Loudwire	3.5/5 stars
Under the Gun Review	6/10

Connect garnered generally mixed reviews from music critics. Stephen Thomas Erlewine of Allmusic called the album "a richer musical experience than the group's previous records", but wrote that the band was "still hampered a bit by their desperate desire to be taken seriously, but the back half of Connect, written largely on acoustic guitars, shows that their strength is not in attitude but rather in softer sonic textures". At Alternative Press, Reed Fischer felt that "Connect grates far too often to live up to its name".

== Track listing ==
All tracks are written by Shimon Moore, Emma Anzai, Antonina Armato, and Tim James, except where noted.

Standard
No.	Title	Writer(s)	Length
1.	"Die to Save You"	Moore; Anzai; Mark Goodwin; Brett Creswell	3:54
2.	"There's No Going Back"	Moore; Anzai; Armato; James; Desmond Child	3:22
3.	"Walking Away"	Moore; Anzai; James; Johnny Andrews	3:01
4.	"Gunfight"		2:55
5.	"Poison"		4:37
6.	"Where Did the Time Go"		2:51
7.	"Telling Lies"		4:24
8.	"Connect"		3:45
9.	"Run"	Moore; Anzai; Scott Stevens	3:46
10.	"The Trick the Devil Did"		2:10
11.	"Healing Now"		4:14
12.	"Under a Very Black Sky"		5:11
Total length:			44:10

iTunes deluxe edition
No.	Title	Length
13.	"What Are You Thinking"	3:14
14.	"No Mercy"	3:35
15.	"Better Waste of Time"	3:34
16.	"There's No Going Back" (rock version)	3:24
Total length:		54:33

Best Buy deluxe edition
No.	Title	Length
17.	"There's No Going Back" (acoustic)	3:18
18.	"Telling Lies" (leaked bootleg)	4:19
Total length:		62:10

== Personnel ==
Sick Puppies

- Shim Moore – lead vocals, guitars
- Emma Anzai – bass, vocals, lead vocals on "Under a Very Black Sky"
- Mark Goodwin – drums, percussion, backing vocals

== Chart performance ==
Chart (2013)	Peak position
US Billboard 200	17
US Rock Albums (Billboard)	3
US Digital Albums (Billboard)	23
US Top Hard Rock Albums (Billboard)	1
US Top Alternative Albums (Billboard)	2
