= Fly (EP) =

EP by Sick Puppies
- Released: 3 March 2003 (CD)
- Recorded: 2002–2003 at Niki Nali Studios & 301 Sydney, Fish Tank Studios
- Genre: Nu metal; alternative metal
- Length: 21:58
- Label: Breaking Records; 932469000801
- Producer: Peter Blytin, Steve Francis

Sick Puppies chronology
Welcome to the Real World (2001)	Fly (2003)	Headphone Injuries (2006)

Professional ratings
Review scores
Source	Rating
Sputnikmusic	1.5/5 stars

Fly is the second EP released by rock band Sick Puppies. It was released in 2003 and features 6 tracks; including a remix by Josh Abrahams, an Enhanced CD featuring the making of the "Fly" music video and a rare version of the clip exclusive to the CD. It is the last release to feature Chris Mileski on drums.

== Track listing ==
All lyrics are written by Shim Moore; all music is composed by Shim Moore, Emma Anzai and Chris Mileski.

No.	Title	Length
1.	"Fly"	3:08
2.	"Alone"	3:09
3.	"Evergreen"	3:26
4.	"Choose"	3:39
5.	"Fly" (Kosst Amojan mix)	4:24
6.	"Fly" (Josh G Abrahams' very metal mix)	4:13
Total length:		21:58

== Personnel ==
Credits for Fly adapted from liner notes.

Sick Puppies

- Shim Moore - lead vocals, guitar
- Emma Anzai - bass, backing vocals
- Chris Mileski - drums

Production

- Peter Blyton - producer, mixing, programming
- Steve Francis - producer, mixing, programming
- Paul Stepanek - executive producer, management
- Don Bartley - mastering
- Anton Hagop & Scott Sandilands - studio assistants
- Josh Abrahams - programming and mixing on track 6

Artwork

- Timo Rissanen - styling
- Ahmed Salama - design & artwork
- Dean Hammer - photography
