= My World (Sick Puppies song) =

Single by Sick Puppies

from the album Dressed Up as Life
- Released: 23 October 2007
- Genre: Post-grunge; hard rock
- Length: 4:03
- Label: Virgin
- Songwriter(s): Tim Price, Emma Anzai, Shimon Moore, Antonina Armato
- Producer(s): Rock Mafia (Tim James, Antonina Armato)

Sick Puppies singles chronology
"All the Same" (2006)	"My World" (2007)	"Killing Myself for Christmas" (2007)

"My World" is a song released by Australian rock band Sick Puppies 2007 album Dressed Up as Life. It was released as a single on 23 October 2007.

== Music video ==
The music video for the song features the band performing, as well as singer/guitarist Shimon Moore giving money to two homeless men, and in return being physically abused by them (a symbol of Moore trying to do good yet getting hurt in return). It also shows bassist Emma Anzai drawing plastic surgery incision marks on herself. It was filmed in the original basement used to film the movie Fight Club.

== Charts ==
Chart (2007)	Peak position
U.S. Billboard Modern Rock Tracks	20
