= Robert M. Knight =

American rock and roll photographer

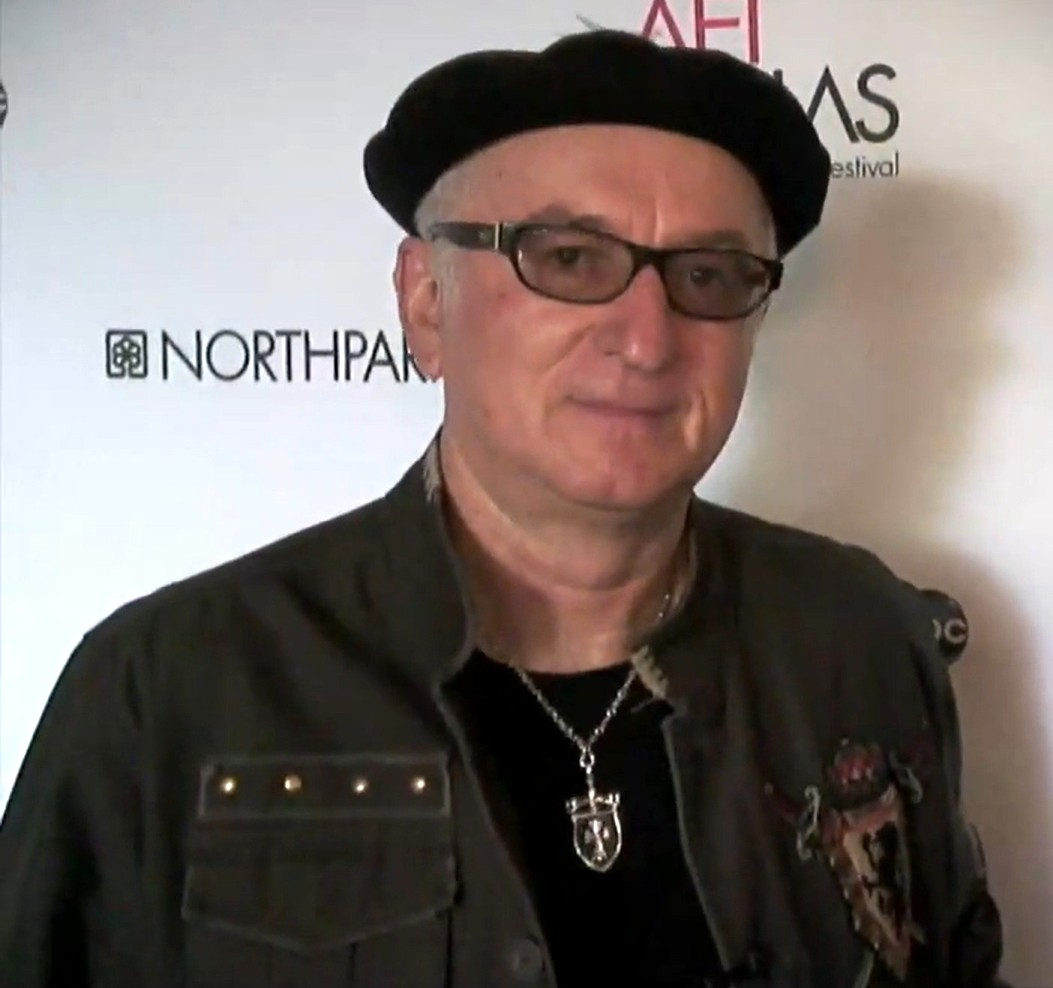
Knight in 2009

Robert M. Knight is a rock and roll photographer that has been active for around 40 years. He is an author and the subject of the documentary film Rock Prophecies. Knight has photographed Jimi Hendrix, Stevie Ray Vaughan, Eric Clapton, Jeff Beck, Steve Vai, and Carlos Santana.
