= All the Same =

Single by Sick Puppies

from the album Dressed Up as Life
- Released: 26 September 2006
- Genre: Alternative rock; post-grunge
- Length: 4:18 (album version); 3:32 (radio edit)
- Label: Virgin
- Songwriters: Tim Price; Emma Anzai; Shimon Moore; Antonina Armato
- Producers: Rock Mafia; Tim James; Antonina Armato

Sick Puppies singles chronology
"Fly" (2003)	"All the Same" (2006)	"My World" (2007)

"All the Same" is a power ballad by Australian band Sick Puppies, released as the first single from their 2007 album Dressed Up as Life, although it was first released on their self-titled EP a year before the album. It reached No. 8 on the US Billboard Modern Rock Tracks chart and featured in the Free Hugs Campaign. The radio edit cuts off the middle of the second verse and end of the third verse, whereas there are no vocals in the third verse.

== Music videos ==
The song has three music videos.

The first is the video of Juan Mann, a man in Sydney famous for initiating the Free Hugs Campaign.

The second is a video with both Juan Mann's Free Hugs Campaign and a live performance. The video went to No. 7 on Fuse TV's Number 1 Countdown.

The third is the first video without the Free Hugs Campaign. It has a storyline about Shimon and his love interest and the tumultuous relationship they are having. Between the girl's presumed infidelity and temper tantrums, he presumably gives up on the relationship. The band is seen performing outside buildings and it later rains with the band performing in the rain.

== Track listing ==
Promo CD single
No.	Title	Length
1.	"All the Same" (radio edit)	3:32
2.	"All the Same" (album version)	4:18

== Charts ==
=== Weekly charts ===
Weekly chart performance for "All the Same"
Chart (2006–2007)	Peak position
Australian Digital Tracks (ARIA)	47
US Alternative Airplay (Billboard)	8
US Mainstream Rock (Billboard)	36

=== Year-end charts ===
Year-end chart performance for "All the Same"
Chart (2007)	Position
US Alternative Songs (Billboard)	19

== Certifications ==
Certifications for "All the Same"
Region	Certification	Certified units/sales
United States (RIAA)	Gold	500,000^{‡}
^{‡} Sales+streaming figures based on certification alone.
