= Pitiful (Sick Puppies song) =

Single by Sick Puppies

from the album Dressed Up as Life
- Released: 26 August 2008
- Genre: Alternative metal
- Length: 3:44
- Label: Virgin
- Songwriter(s): Tim Price, Emma Anzai, Shimon Moore, Antonina Armato
- Producer(s): Rock Mafia (Tim James, Antonina Armato)

Sick Puppies singles chronology
| "What Are You Looking For" (2008) | "Pitiful" (2008) | "You're Going Down" (2009) |

"Pitiful" is the fourth single released from Sick Puppies' 2007 album Dressed Up as Life. This song talks about how useless someone thinks their life is, to the point where they feel like killing themselves. The person has been looking for a reason to not end it all, but has not found one by the end of the song. The subject of the song has abused all the drugs he knows of, with the only exceptions being heroin and cyanide because he "can't afford them yet".

== Music video ==
The band released a live presentation as the official video for the single.

== Track listing ==
Digital download
| No. | Title | Length |
|---|---|---|
| 1. | "Pitiful" (Radio edit) | 3:44 |
