= Shimon Moore =

Australian musician (born 1982)

Shimon "Shim" Moore
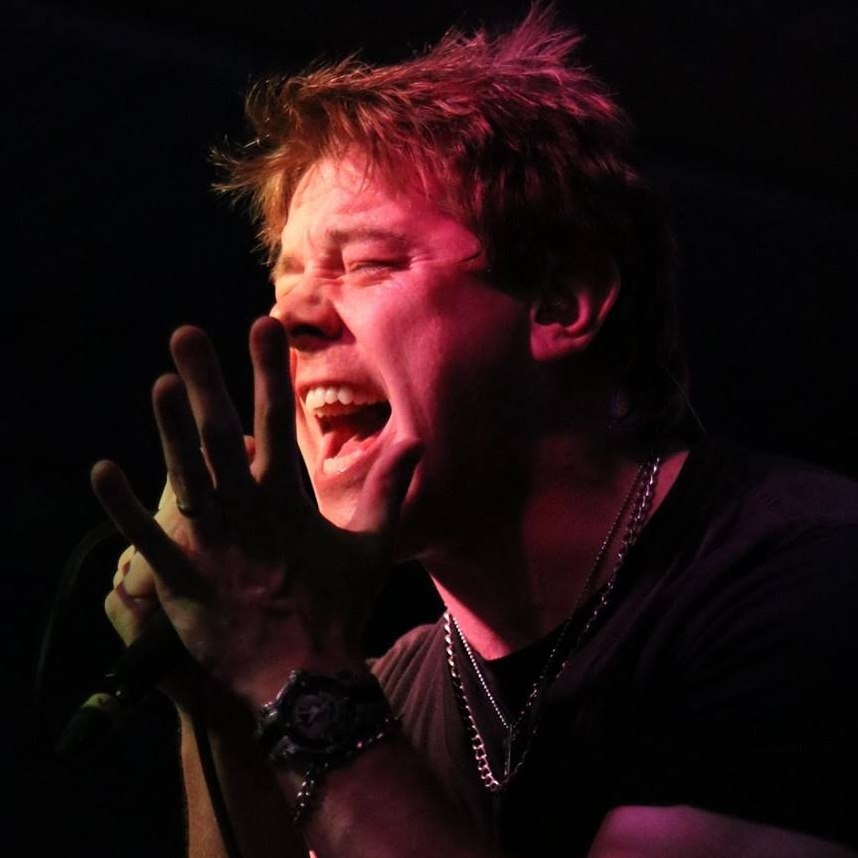
- Moore in 2021

Background information
- Born: 11 November 1982 (age 43); Sydney, Australia
- Genres: Post grunge; hard rock; alternative metal; nu metal; alternative rock
- Occupations: Singer; musician; songwriter; actor
- Instruments: Vocals; guitar
- Years active: 1997–present
- Member of: Shim
- Formerly of: Sick Puppies
- Website: shimmusic.com

Shimon "Shim" Moore (born 11 November 1982) is an Australian rock singer, guitarist, songwriter, and occasional actor.

== Career ==
=== Acting ===
Moore's first movie role was as the lead in the 2000 fantasy film Selkie, when he was 17. Three years later, he appeared in an episode of the TV show All Saints, and he had a part in the 2011 Canadian post-apocalyptic film The Day.

=== Sick Puppies ===
In 1997, Moore co-founded the rock band Sick Puppies and remained their frontman, lead singer, guitarist, and co-songwriter for 17 years, releasing four studio albums with them. In 2012, he shared a Songwriter Award at the BMI Pop Awards for the 2010 Sick Puppies track "Maybe". In 2014, he was fired from the band for undisclosed reasons.

=== Shim ===
Later in 2014, Moore co-wrote the song "Wasted Love" for Matt McAndrew, which was debuted on season 7 of The Voice. The track went on to reach No. 1 on the US iTunes singles chart.

In 2018, Moore formed the group Shim, which was essentially his backing band. They released their first single, "Hallelujah", on 16 May, and followed it with a self-titled album in September that featured Red Hot Chili Peppers drummer, Chad Smith, on two tracks. Another single, "Crucified", came out in 2019. The same year, Moore co-wrote and recorded vocals for the official theme song of the video game Resident Evil 2, "Saudade", which won Best Original Song in a Video Game at the 2019 Hollywood Music in Media Awards. In December 2023, Shim released a parody Christmas EP titled Drunk on Christmas.

=== Other projects ===
Moore co-hosts the podcast Rockstar 101 with Brandon Coates. During the COVID-19 pandemic and the lockdowns imposed by the Australian government, he created a channel on Twitch called The Hollywood Rebellion, where he live-streamed acoustic performances, Q&A sessions, and collaborative songwriting projects called "The Lockdown Sessions". He also offers songwriting classes on his website.

== Discography ==
=== with Sick Puppies ===
- Welcome to the Real World (2001)
- Dressed Up as Life (2007)
- Tri-Polar (2009)
- Connect (2013)

=== with Shim ===
Albums

- Shim (2018)
- Drunk on Christmas (EP, 2023)

Singles

Title	Year	Peak chart positions	Album
Title	Year	US Main. Rock	Album
"Hallelujah"	2018	27	Shim
"A Brand New War"	2018	—	Shim
"Broken Men"	2018	—	Shim
"Crucified"	2019	26	Shim

Music videos

Title	Year	Director(s)	Ref.
"Hallelujah"	2018	Brady Tulk	
"Crucified"	2019	Robyn August	
"Drunk on Christmas"	2023	Shimon Moore	
