= Polar Opposite =

EP by Sick Puppies
- Released: 1 March 2011
- Genre: Acoustic rock
- Length: 26:06
- Label: Virgin
- Producer: Rock Mafia (Tim James, Antonina Armato)

Sick Puppies chronology
Live & Unplugged (2010)	Polar Opposite (2011)	Connect (2013)

Polar Opposite is the sixth EP by the Australian rock band Sick Puppies. It features acoustic versions of many of their most well-known songs, including "All the Same". The EP was released on 1 March 2011.

== Track listing ==
No.	Title	Writer(s)	Length
1.	"You're Going Down" (acoustic)	Anzai, Armato, James, Moore	4:09
2.	"Riptide" (acoustic)	Anzai, Armato, James, Moore	3:21
3.	"Maybe" (acoustic)	Anzai, Frederiksen, Moore	3:30
4.	"Odd One" (acoustic)	Anzai, Armato, James, Moore	3:44
5.	"Don't Walk Away" (acoustic)	Anzai, Frederiksen, Moore	3:42
6.	"All the Same" (acoustic)	Moore	4:16
7.	"White Balloons" (acoustic)	Anzai, Armato, James, Moore	3:24
8.	"So What I Lied" (acoustic) (Wal-Mart bonus track)	Anzai, Armato, James, Moore	3:12
Total length:			29:18

== Personnel ==
- Shim Moore – lead vocals, lead guitar
- Emma Anzai – bass, backing vocals, lead vocals on "White Balloons"
- Mark Goodwin – drums
