= Live & Unplugged =

EP by Sick Puppies
- Released: 6 April 2010
- Recorded: 2010 at Rock Mafia Studios in Santa Monica, California (tracks 1–3); 21 May 2009 at Q101, Chicago, Illinois (track 4)
- Genre: Acoustic rock
- Length: 12:32
- Label: Virgin; 509996 28206 2 2
- Producer: Rock Mafia (Tim James, Antonina Armato)

Sick Puppies chronology
Tri-Polar (2009)	Live & Unplugged (2010)	Polar Opposite (2011)

Live & Unplugged is an acoustic EP by Australian band Sick Puppies. "Odd One", "So What I Lied", and "The Pretender" were recorded in a studio, while "You're Going Down" was recorded live. This EP was sold via digital stores while physical copies were available during Record Store Day. The album is currently no longer available on iTunes.

== Track listing ==
Standard
No.	Title	Writer(s)	Length
1.	"Odd One (Acoustic)"	Moore, Anzai, Armato, James	3:32
2.	"So What I Lied (Acoustic)"	Moore, Anzai, Armato, James	3:12
3.	"The Pretender (Acoustic)"	Moore, Anzai, Armato, James, Schmalholz	3:01
4.	"You're Going Down (Acoustic) (Live)"	Moore, Anzai, Armato, James	2:47
Total length:			12:32

== Personnel ==
Sick Puppies

- Shim Moore – lead vocals, lead guitar
- Emma Anzai – bass, backing vocals
- Mark Goodwin – drums

Production

- Tim James – producer
- Antonina Armato – producer
- Paul Palmer – mixing, A&R
- Kim Stephens – A&R
- Brad Blackwoord – mastering
- Paul Stepanek – management

Artwork

- Mike Joyce – design
- Travis Shinn – photography
