= Tri-Polar =

Studio album by Sick Puppies
- Released: 14 July 2009
- Recorded: December 2008 – 2009
- Genre: Alternative metal; nu metal; post-grunge; alternative rock
- Length: 46:06
- Label: Virgin
- Producer: Rock Mafia; Tim James; Antonina Armato

Sick Puppies chronology
Dressed Up as Life (2007)	Tri-Polar (2009)	Live & Unplugged (2010)

Singles from Tri-Polar
- 1. "You're Going Down" Released: 2 June 2009; 2. "Odd One" Released: 2 November 2009; 3. "Maybe" Released: 22 June 2010; 4. "Riptide" Released: 8 February 2011

Alternative cover

Professional ratings
Review scores
Source	Rating
Allmusic	2/5 stars
Rock on Request	(favorable)
Tunelab	6.5/10 stars
Type 3 Media	6.5/10 stars

Tri-Polar is the third studio album by Australian rock band Sick Puppies, released on 14 July 2009.

== Background ==
The album debuted at number 31 on the Billboard 200 albums chart, selling around 16,500 copies. Tri-Polar has sold over 379,000 copies as of 2013. The band's first single titled "You're Going Down", was used by the WWE as the official theme song for their PPV event WWE Extreme Rules 2009, and the video game WWE SmackDown vs. Raw 2010. The song was also used in the 2010 live-action film adaptation of Tekken and the trailer for My Soul to Take.

The song "War" was written for Capcom's video game Street Fighter IV and has been used in their respective advertisements for the game. The second single from the album, titled "Odd One", was released to rock radio on 10 November 2009. The third single, "Maybe", was released to rock radio on 22 June 2010. This is the band's most successful single to date. The fourth single from the album, "Riptide", was released to rock radio on 8 February 2011.

== Track listing ==
All tracks are written by Shimon Moore, Emma Anzai, Antonina Armato, and Tim James, except where noted.

Standard
No.	Title	Writer(s)	Length
1.	"War"	Moore; Anzai	3:13
2.	"I Hate You"	Moore; Anzai; Marti Frederiksen	3:28
3.	"Riptide"		3:11
4.	"You're Going Down"		3:07
5.	"Odd One"		3:47
6.	"So What I Lied"		3:42
7.	"Survive"	Moore; Anzai; Skidd Mills; Jason Null	3:12
8.	"Should've Known Better"	Moore; Anzai; Mills	3:52
9.	"Maybe"	Moore; Anzai; Frederiksen	3:29
10.	"Don't Walk Away"	Moore; Anzai; Frederiksen	3:48
11.	"Master of the Universe"		3:33
12.	"In It for Life"		4:05
13.	"White Balloons"		3:39
Total length:			46:06

iTunes bonus track
No.	Title	Length
14.	"Dead Space"	3:12

Walmart digital bonus track
No.	Title	Writer(s)	Length
14.	"The Pretender"	Moore; Anzai; Armato; James; Schmalholz	3:08

Napster bonus track
No.	Title	Writer(s)	Length
14.	"Til Something Breaks"	Moore; Anzai; Brett Creswell	2:47

Deluxe edition bonus disc
No.	Title	Writer(s)	Length
1.	"You're Going Down" (Polar Opposite version)		4:09
2.	"Riptide" (Polar Opposite version)		3:21
3.	"Maybe" (Polar Opposite version)	Moore; Anzai; Frederiksen	3:30
4.	"Odd One" (Polar Opposite version)		3:44
5.	"Don't Walk Away" (Polar Opposite version)	Moore; Anzai; Frederiksen	3:42
6.	"All the Same" (Polar Opposite version)		4:16
7.	"White Balloons" (Polar Opposite version)		3:24
8.	"Dead Space"		3:12
9.	"The Pretender"	Moore; Anzai; Armato; James; Schmalholz	3:08
10.	"Til Something Breaks"	Moore; Anzai; Creswell	2:47
11.	"Monsters"	Moore; Anzai; Creswell	4:08
Total length:			39:21

International version
No.	Title	Writer(s)	Length
1.	"All the Same"		4:19
2.	"Riptide" (edit)		3:00
3.	"Maybe"	Moore; Anzai; Frederiksen	3:25
4.	"Odd One"		3:47
5.	"You're Going Down"		3:07
6.	"Should've Known Better"	Moore; Anzai; Mills	3:52
7.	"Don't Walk Away"	Moore; Anzai; Frederiksen	3:48
8.	"White Balloons"		3:39
9.	"My World"		3:59
10.	"Survive"	Moore; Anzai; Mills; Null	3:12
11.	"I Hate You"	Moore; Anzai; Frederiksen	3:28
12.	"War"	Moore; Anzai	3:14
Total length:			42:54

== Tour ==
Sick Puppies supported Rev Theory and Breaking Benjamin during the end of 2009, and also co-headlined a tour with Hurt, The Veer Union, Adelitas Way and Tunnels to Holland as support acts. They also supported Nickelback on their Dark Horse World tour.

Sick Puppies headlined a 2010 summer tour with Janus, My Darkest Days and It's Alive as support.

On 14 December 2010, Shimon Moore announced during a show in Council Bluffs, IA that that show was the largest show ever to date. Also at that show was Shaman's Harvest and Emphatic.

== Personnel ==
Sick Puppies

- Shim Moore – lead vocals, guitars
- Emma Anzai – bass, backing vocals
- Mark Goodwin – drums

Artwork

- Matt Taylor – cover design
- Travis Shinn – photography

Production

- Antonina Armato – producer
- Tim James – producer
- Adam Comstock, Dorian Crozier, Steve Hammons, Ross Hogarth, and Nigel Lundemo – engineers
- Robert Vosgien – mastering
- Ben Grosse and Mark Needham – mixing
- Will Brierre and Paul Pavao – mixing assistants
- Devrim "DK" Karaoglu – programming

== Chart performances ==
=== Album ===
Chart (2009–2011)	Peak position
New Zealand Albums Chart	17
US Billboard 200	31
US Billboard Alternative Albums	9
US Billboard Hard Rock Albums	11
US Billboard Rock Albums	12
US Billboard Digital Albums	24
UK Albums Chart	148

=== Singles ===
Year	Song	Peak positions			
Year	Song	U.S.	Mainstream Rock	Alternative Songs	US Rock
2009	"You're Going Down"	108	2	11	8
2009	"Odd One"	—	6	15	10
2010	"Maybe"	56	20	6	15
2011	"Riptide"	—	3	14	6

== Certifications ==
Certifications for Tri-Polar
Region	Certification	Certified units/sales
United States (RIAA)	Gold	500,000^{‡}
^{‡} Sales+streaming figures based on certification alone.
