= Tripolar =

Tripolar or Tri-Polar may refer to:

- Tripolarity, a system of power in international relations
- Tri-Polar, an album by Sick Puppies

== See also ==
- Multipolar (disambiguation)
