= Maneater (2009 film) =

- DVD cover
- Directed by: Michael Emanuel
- Written by: John K. Anderson; Michael Emanuel
- Produced by: Michael Emanuel; Kelly Hirano; Eric Lewald
- Starring: Dean Cain; Lacy Phillips; Stephen Lunsford; Christopher Darga; Nicole Moore; Allison Kyler; Conrad Janis
- Cinematography: James Lawrence Spencer
- Edited by: Michael Emanuel
- Music by: Claude Foisy
- Production company: Canal Street Films
- Distributed by: Arsenal Pictures; Lightning Media
- Release date: October 2009 (Shriekfest)
- Running time: 88 minutes
- Country: United States
- Language: English

Maneater is a 2009 direct-to-video natural horror film directed by Michael Emanuel and starring Dean Cain, Lacy Phillips, Stephen Lunsford, Christopher Darga, Nicole Moore, Allison Kyler, Conrad Janis, Robert R. Shafer, Shea Curry and Bobby Ray Shafer.

== Plot ==
A former FBI profiler, now a sheriff of a small town and single parent of a high school-aged daughter, begins to profile a series of unexplained murders only to find out that the monster he's profiling may be himself.

== Cast ==
- Dean Cain as Harry
- Lacy Phillips as Pearl
- Stephen Lunsford as Todd
- Christopher Darga as Zeus
- Nicole Moore as Kay
- Maximillian Roeg as Wahoo
- Ellie Gerber as Buckly
- Saginaw Grant as Stanley Hipp
- Conrad Janis as Doc Gramm
- Donna W. Scott as Ruthie
- Damara Reilly as Marcy
- Cord Jackman as Carter
- Patrick Shining Elk as Bernard
- John Brady as Martin
- Tanner Novlan as Roger Raintree
- Allison Kyler as Violet Messer
- Paul Schackman as Sam Radcliff
- Lovake Heyer as Red Bear
- Mercy Malick as Morning Sky
- Joe O'Connor as Minister
- Shea Curry as Marge
- Keli Daniels as Kay's Mother
- Bobby Ray Shafer as Gus
- Helena Jacobson as Kelsey
- Lynn Milano as Older Woman
- Maria Grimm as Suzy the Nurse
- Walter Phelan as Windigo

== Production ==
Dean Cain narrated the film at 2009 Shriekfest Film Festival, which ran from 1 October between 4th, 2009 in Los Angeles.
