= I Am God =

- Veronica Mars episode
- In a dream sequence, Veronica's talks to one of the dead bus crash victims. Reviewers were polarized on the visuals of the dream sequences: Some criticized and others praised the visuals of the dream sequence, with one saying that it looked "like Bonnie Tyler videos and bad erotic movies from the '80s", while another called it "hyper-stylized", "washed-out", and "upfront about the weird, symbolic space it's working in."
- Episode no.: Season 2 Episode 18
- Directed by: Martha Mitchell
- Written by: Diane Ruggiero; Cathy Belben
- Production code: 2T7218
- Original air date: April 11, 2006

Guest appearances
- Alona Tal as Meg Manning; Jeremy Ray Valdez as Marcos Oliveres; James Jordan as Tommy "Lucky" Dohanic; Kayla Ewell as Angie Dahl; Luke Frydenger as Peter Ferrer; Blythe Auffarth as Betina Marone; Paula Marshall as Rebecca James

Episode chronology
← Previous "Plan B"	Next → "Nevermind the Buttocks"
- Veronica Mars season 2

"I Am God" is the eighteenth episode of the second season of the American mystery television series Veronica Mars, and the fortieth episode overall. Written by Diane Ruggiero and Cathy Belben and directed by Martha Mitchell, the episode premiered on UPN on April 11, 2006.

The series depicts the adventures of Veronica Mars (Kristen Bell) as she deals with life as a high school student while moonlighting as a private detective. In this episode, Veronica experiences persistent and vivid nightmares of the students who died in the bus crash, and she attempts to piece together the clues she's gotten from these dreams. Meanwhile, Logan (Jason Dohring) and Wallace (Percy Daggs III) are forced to work together on a science experiment.

During the filming of "I Am God", several press members, primarily bloggers, were allowed to visit the show's set, an event that was the first of its kind for Veronica Mars. Bloggers had been an important source of the show's fandom and press coverage, and the event was set up by UPN executives as a public relations project. The episode also features a guest appearance by Kayla Ewell and the first appearance by James Jordan. The episode received 1.76 million viewers in its original US airing, and it received mixed reviews from television critics, with reviewers divided on the use of dream sequences as well as the episode's emotional impact overall.

== Synopsis ==
Veronica has a dream of the students who died in the bus crash. She is called into the office of the guidance counselor, Rebecca (Paula Marshall), who asks if Veronica is okay, and Veronica tells her about her nightmares. Veronica lists the bus crash victims; Cervando, Betina, Rhonda, Marcos, Peter, and Meg. She asks Rebecca about a janitor named Lucky (James Jordan), whom Meg used to write about a lot. Veronica continues to describe her dreams. She also tells Rebecca about Michelle, who turned out to have a second voicemail from the bus, this one containing Dick's voice. Veronica recounts an encounter with her father, in which she admitted sneaking on the bus, where she found a CD containing voicemails Dick left Betina. She also found graffiti on one of the bus seats containing the words "I am God" and drawings of nine coffins. Veronica talks to Logan about Lucky, the janitor, and Logan reminds Veronica she met Lucky before. Wallace and Logan are assigned to work on a science project together.

Veronica talks to Dick about his relationship with Betina. Veronica talks to one of Betina's friends, who says that Dick mistreated her, and Betina's goal was for Dick to get her pregnant. Veronica asks Keith about whether or not he has resumed a relationship with Rebecca, and Veronica gets into Stanford University. Principal Clemmons informs Veronica that due to a recalculation Angie Dahl (Kayla Ewell) now has the highest GPA and is in the lead for the Kane Scholarship. Rebecca denies having a relationship with Keith, while Angie also gets into Stanford, and Dick is told he'll have to attend summer school. Wallace points out Rhonda's sister, Natalie, to Veronica, but she blows Veronica off. Veronica asks Keith to dig into the financial records of the bus crash victims. While working on their project Wallace comes across the Echolls expose. Veronica learns that none of the families had very much money, except for Rhonda's family, who won a separate $2 million lawsuit from Woody (Steve Guttenberg).

Keith meets with Principal Clemmons where he finds Veronica hiding in the closet. Veronica talks to Mr. Wu about one of his students, Peter, who had a crush on Mr. Wu. However, Mr. Wu denies being gay. That night, Veronica has a dream about Peter. When she brings up the "outing of all outings" Peter "asks" her why he would even want to go to a baseball stadium. Veronica learns Cervando got in trouble for pushing Beaver into a wall during summer school. Beaver tells Veronica Cervando had a problem with Dick, but took it out on him. Keith solves a case for Principal Clemmons regarding students who paid money to be diagnosed with generalized anxiety disorder in order to earn better grades. Angie wins the experiment competition, and it is shown that Angie was one of the students who was diagnosed with GAD for money. Principal Clemmons revokes exceptions for GAD students. Veronica has a dream about Cervando, who points out the perpetrator had to know when the bus was approaching the cliff. Veronica learns that the "I am God" image is actually an album cover. Keith tells Veronica that Dick Casablancas Sr had large life insurance policies on Dick and Beaver. Veronica has another, more frightening dream.

== Production ==
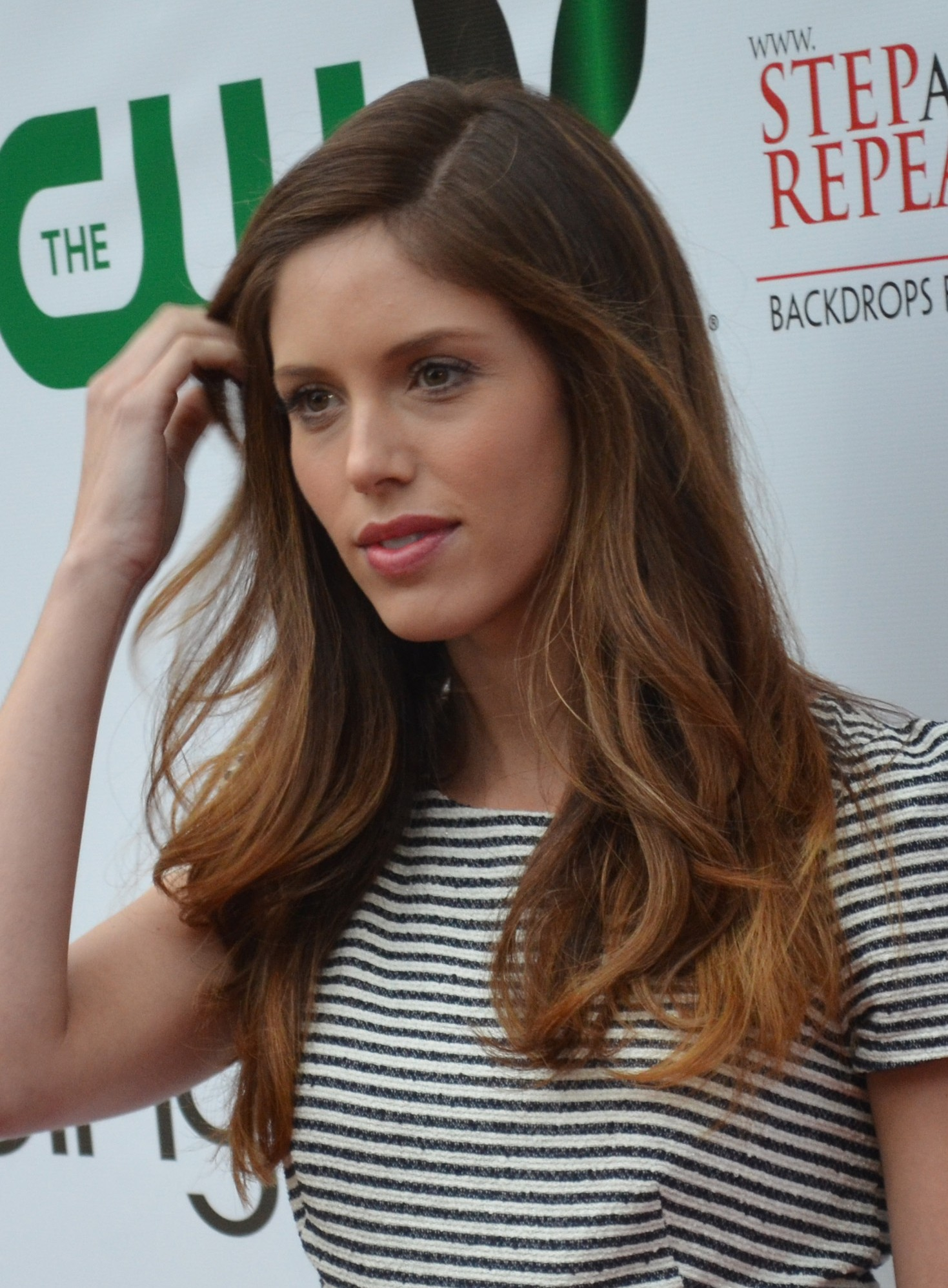
Kayla Ewell guest starred in the episode.

"I Am God" was written by Diane Ruggiero and Cathy Belben and directed by Martha Mitchell, marking Ruggiero's eleventh writing credit for the series, Belben's third and final writing credit (after "Blast from the Past" and "Ahoy, Mateys!") and Mitchell's first and only directing credit for the show. Despite being credited, Duncan (Teddy Dunn), Weevil (Francis Capra), and Jackie (Tessa Thompson) do not appear in the episode. During the filming of "I Am God", UPN and Warner Bros. set up a "Veronica Mars Press Day", on which several members of the press visited the show's set and wrote about their visit. Bloggers had been important to press coverage of Veronica Mars; because of this, Joanna Massey, UPN's senior vice president for media relations, decided to set up this event as a public relations project. On organizing the event, Massey elaborated:

Once we sent out the invitations, there was instantly a lot of (Internet) chatter about why we invited certain people. Then there was chatter leading up to the trip, and there was chatter when everyone got back. And they instantly posted all of their photos, which I love. And then they will blog again when the episode runs. With the traditional media, when do you get that kind of coverage?

Series creator Rob Thomas also appreciated bloggers' contributions to Veronica Mars, stating "Sometimes I think bloggers are our journalists. […] I feel like the bloggers made the show. In a way, a day like (the press day) is preaching to the choir, but I don't know that we'd exist without them." This was the first time that non-cast or crew members visited the set. After reaching Kearny Mesa, San Diego, where the show primarily films, the bloggers toured the set and talked with cast and crew members. One press member expressed that Ryan Hansen, Thomas, and Kristen Bell were especially kind and receptive to the visitors.

On his role in the episode, Jason Dohring, who plays Logan, elaborated, "I think what's funny is that he always gets what's coming to him. Like a terrible thing happens to him, but he's like that to other people. So it's like in real life…what goes around comes around." The episode features a guest-starring appearance by Kayla Ewell, who would eventually become most known for her role on The Vampire Diaries. The episode also features a guest appearance by James Jordan, as Lucky, the janitor. In season 3, Jordan would become the first actor to have two different roles on Veronica Mars when he was cast as Tim Foyle, a teaching assistant.

== Reception ==
=== Ratings ===
In its original broadcast, "I Am God" was watched by 1.76 million viewers, ranking 111th of 116 in the weekly rankings. This marked a sharp decrease in 1.09 million viewers from the previous episode, "Plan B", which received 2.85 million viewers.

=== Reviews ===
The episode received mixed reviews. Rowan Kaiser, writing for The A.V. Club was very positive towards the episode, writing "'I Am God' is probably the strangest episode since 'Nobody Puts Baby in a Corner', but unlike that one's somewhat random focus, 'I Am God' is intently pointed at one thing: the bus crash." While wishing that it had come earlier in the season, the reviewer wrote that "its intense style and emotional stakes put it on the shortlist of best Veronica Mars episodes." Price Peterson of TV.com praised the dream sequences for their beauty, but criticized them for their complexity. "Man, I just could not get enough of the dream-flashbacks in which Veronica talked to the dead students. So beautiful and well-done. On the other hand, my poor brain is starting to have a hard time keeping all the facts straight."

Others were more negative towards the episode. Television Without Pity gave the episode a "B", criticizing Paula Marshall's reappearance, declaring her a "show killer." BuzzFeed ranked the episode as the second-worst episode of Veronica Mars, writing that the dream sequences "[looked] like Bonnie Tyler videos and bad erotic movies from the '80s." Reviewer Alan Sepinwall gave a mixed review, praising Logan and Wallace's interactions and Kristen Bell's performance, but criticizing the fact that the episode came so late in the season. "Had this been the season's fourth or fifth episode, it would have been fine. As the fifth-to-last episode, it felt like exactly what it was: a belated correction for a season-long problem." He also felt that "Keith's subplot was missing a scene or two."
