= Stephen Sean Ford =

American actor (born 1989)

Stephen Ford
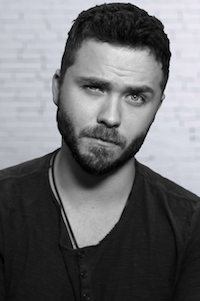
- Ford in 2016
- Born: Stephen Sean Lunsford; November 25, 1989 (age 36); Sacramento, California, U.S.
- Occupation: Actor
- Years active: 2003–present

Stephen Sean Ford (né Lunsford; born November 25, 1989) is an American actor and internet content producer. He played the titular character in The CW's Kamen Rider: Dragon Knight.

== Early life ==
Ford was born in Sacramento, California. His parents sent him to acting class in elementary school to keep him out of trouble.

== Career ==
Ford participated in Looking Ahead, a youth program sponsored by the Actors Fund of America, as a teen. He was a member of the Leadership Council from 2006 to 2007. He began producing his own independent videos on YouTube in 2006. His content consisted of parodies of blockbuster films such as Inception, Twilight, and The Hangover.

Ford's early roles included minor characters in Zoey 101, Bratz, and Victorious. In 2009, he was cast in the main role for the kids' TV show Kamen Rider: Dragon Knight. Ford co-starred in the horror films Maneater and Beneath the Darkness. In 2012, he was cast as Matt Daehler in a recurring role on Teen Wolf. Ford appeared in the psychological thriller film Homecoming, released on December 31, 2013.

In 2014, shortly after his role on Switched at Birth, he took a hiatus from acting. In 2016, he started working for YouTube gaming channel Machinima as a host, editor, and producer for a variety of content. This sub-channel, Ascender, focused on live action adaptations of video games, starting with SIXERS, based on Ubisoft's Rainbow Six: Siege. Ford parted ways with the company, taking the Ascender channel with him, using it to rebrand his own production company.

== Filmography ==
Film roles
Year	Title	Role	Notes
2005	Blood Deep	Young Wil	
2006	The Problem with Percival	Kyle Strum	Short film
2007	Bratz	Cameron	
2009	Maneater	Todd	
2011	The Hangover Hollywood	Stephen	Short film
2011	Beneath the Darkness	Brian	
2012	The Bournes Anonymous	Jason Bourne	Short film
2012	Fanatic	Himself	Short film
2013	First	Jesse	Short film
2014	Homecoming	Young Wil	Sequel to Blood Deep (2005)
2015	Wrestling Isn't Wrestling	Theatre Audience Member	Video documentary short
2015	Getaway	XXXX	Short film
2016	Slay Belles	Sean	
2016	I Am Watching You	Stranger	

Television roles
Year	Title	Role	Notes
2003	Malcolm in the Middle	Neighborhood Kid	2 episodes (Season 4, Episode 13 and 14)
2004	Unfabulous	Chad Fennell	3 episodes (Season 1, Episode 4, 10, and 13)
2005	The Young and the Restless	Steven	Episode 8258
2007	Zoey 101	Greg	Season 3, Episode 15
2007	Cory in the House	Schulman	Season 1, Episode 19
2008–2009	Kamen Rider: Dragon Knight	Kit Taylor, Dragon Knight, and Adam, Onyx	Main role, dual role
2009	Desperate Housewives	Travers McLain	Season 5, Episode 19
2009–2010	Private Practice	Fillmore 'Dink' Davis	Recurring role (seasons 3–4), 6 episodes
2011	Victorious	Dale Squires	Season 1, Episode 19
2012	Teen Wolf	Matt Daehler	Recurring role (season 2), 9 episodes
2013	Switched at Birth	Teo Hanahan	2 episodes (Season 2, Episode 1 and 2)
2016	Future Girl	Hubble	Season 1, Episode 3
