= Shea Curry =

American actress

- Born: 1972 or 1973 (age 53–54); Hattiesburg, Mississippi, U.S.
- Education: Marymount Manhattan College
- Occupation: Actress
- Years active: 1999-present

Shea Curry (born 1972 or 1973) is an American actress, who portrayed the lady's maid Brigitte in The Princess Diaries 2: Royal Engagement (2004).

== Early years ==
Curry is a native of Hattiesburg, Mississippi. She is the daughter of James and Kathy Curry, and she has two younger brothers and a younger sister. She attended Hattiesburg High School and performed in productions there and at the Hattiesburg Civic Light Opera. In 1991 she was selected as a member of the all-star cast at Mississippi's state drama festival and she was Forrest County's representative in the Mississippi's Young Woman of the Year competition. She graduated from Marymount Manhattan College on a full scholarship.

== Career ==
Curry appeared in Broadway's The Little Prince at the Promenade Theatre, New York. She received a Garland Award nomination for Best Actress in a Play 2001 for her role as Blue in Beirut. Her original music is featured on the A & R Network website. Curry also appeared in other Broadway shows such as Showboat (opposite Cloris Leachman and Len Cariou), Can't Stop Dancin', West Side Story and Evening with Charles Strouse.

Curry's first TV appearance was in a 1998 episode of NBC's One World. She also appeared in Malcolm in the Middle, Lucky, Days of Our Lives, Grounded for Life and Las Vegas. She was filming the American version of The IT Crowd on February 16, 2007, as Emily opposite Joel McHale. She also appeared in The Hard Times of RJ Berger (2010) as Jenni.

In October 2011, Curry was a contestant on the new Lifetime reality series Project Accessory.

=== Jewelry design ===
Curry's work with jewelry began while she was making The Princess Diaries 2: Royal Engagement as she used her time during breaks to create jewelry items to give to other women in the cast. What began as "a fun little hobby" grew into doing trunk shows. Then friends began requesting creation of jewelry items, which she called "very much statement pieces". Eventually the hobby became a business, Shameless Jewelry, based on Curry's trademark style of including good girl/bad girl elements in each of her creations. Most of them are pewter plated with gold or sterling silver.

== Filmography ==
| Year | Title | Role |
|---|---|---|
| 1999 | Little Indiscretions | Whitney |
| 1999 | Nice Guys Sleep Alone | Girl in Park |
| 2000 | Jonni Nitro | All Bad Female Roles |
| 2001 | Karma To Burn | Lisa |
| 2003 | Ask Curtis | Jen |
| 2004 | The Princess Diaries 2: Royal Engagement | Lady's Maid Brigitte |
| 2004 | Straight-Jacket | Starlet |
| 2005 | Bigger Than the Sky | Mary Anne |
| 2005 | Tom 51 | Receptionist |
| 2006 | I-See-You.Com | Chloe |
| 2007 | Georgia Rule | Melodee |
| 2007 | Screw Cupid | Shaana Martell |
| 2007 | Only For You | Dana |
| 2009 | Maneater | Marge |
| 2010 | Valentine's Day | Elise |
| 2010 | Nip/Tuck | Rebecca |
| 2010 | The Hard Times of RJ Berger | Jenni |
| 2011 | New Year's Eve | Wendy |
| 2011 | Project Accessory | Herself |
