= Kayla Ewell =

American actress (born 1985)

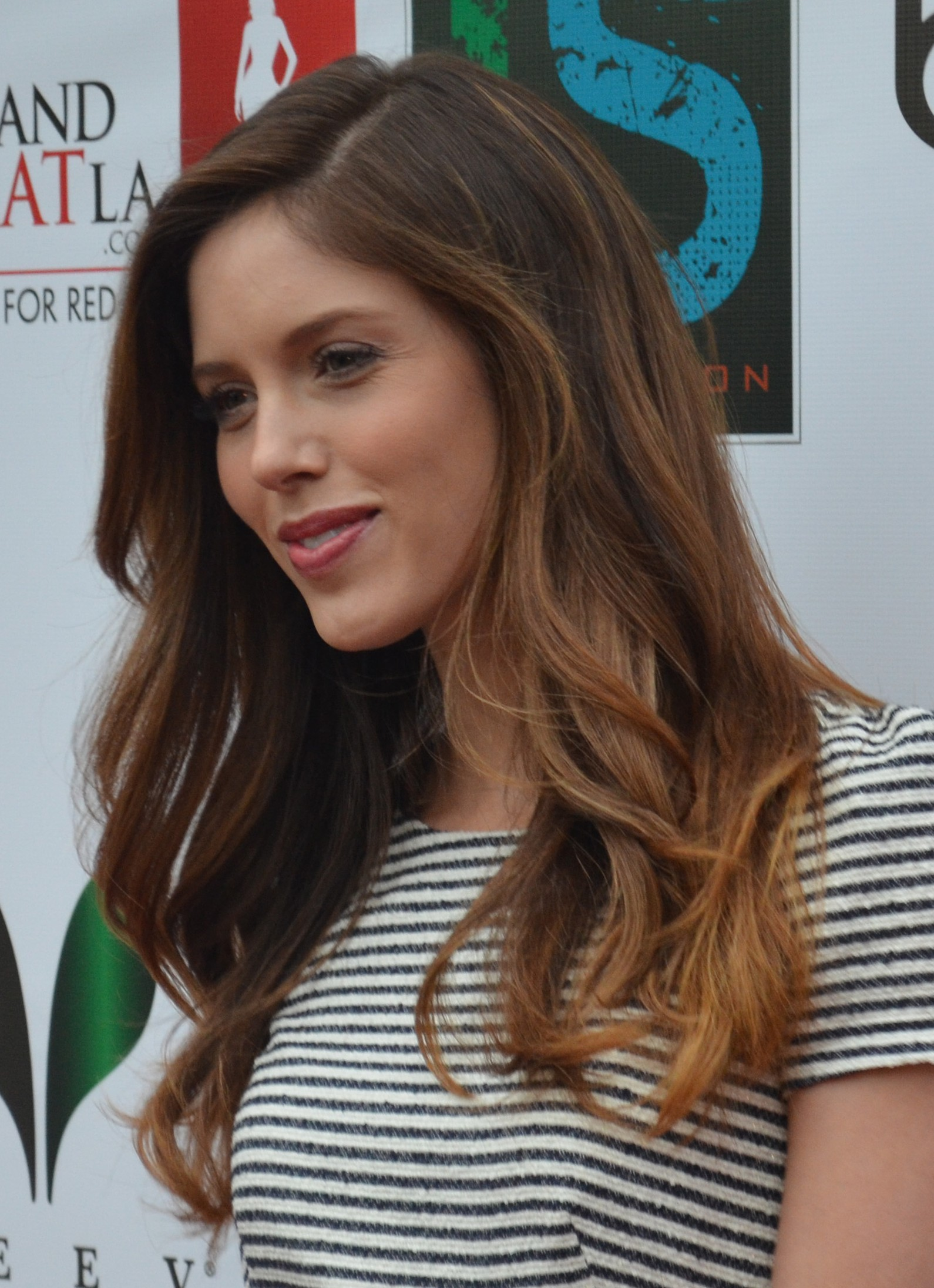
- Ewell in 2012
- Born: August 27, 1985 (age 40); Long Beach, California, U.S.
- Occupation: Actress
- Years active: 1999–present
- Spouse: Tanner Novlan (m. 2015)
- Children: 2

Kayla Ewell (born August 27, 1985) is an American actress known for her roles on television as Caitlin Ramirez on CBS's long-running soap opera The Bold and the Beautiful, as Maureen Sampson on NBC's Freaks and Geeks, and as Vicki Donovan on The CW's The Vampire Diaries.

== Early life ==
Ewell was born in Long Beach, California, and raised in Seal Beach. She studied dance, singing, and acting at the Orange County Song & Dance Company in Westminster, California. Ewell was spotted by a talent agent while taking an acting class around 1999, who asked her to go on an audition.

== Career ==
Ewell first appeared on the television series Freaks and Geeks in 2000, playing Maureen Sampson in the episode "Carded and Discarded", directed by Judd Apatow. She starred on the soap opera The Bold and the Beautiful from 2004–2005, and has guest-starred on the TV series The O.C., Boston Public, Veronica Mars, Close to Home and Entourage. She had a role in the film Just My Luck, starring Lindsay Lohan, and in Material Girls, starring Hilary and Haylie Duff, in 2006. She had a starring role in the film Senior Skip Day.

Ewell co-starred in The CW television series The Vampire Diaries for the first seven episodes in 2009. Ewell described her character, Vicki Donovan, to Star magazine as "a really slutty high school student", and "a troublemaker". Vicki was the first human on the series turned into a vampire. Ewell was killed off the show when her character was staked in the heart by Stefan (Paul Wesley) in order to save Elena (Nina Dobrev) in the Halloween-themed episode "Haunted". Ewell hinted in November 2009 that she was still under contract for the role and might return to the show, but series creator, Kevin Williamson, stated that there were no plans to bring her back. Her character did return however in several episodes as a ghost on the “other side”, she featured in the finale of the second season, the start of season 3 and was a major feature role in the series finale of The Vampire Diaries (season 8) when she is briefly brought back from the dead by the titular Vampire Katherine Pierce to help her destroy the town of mystic falls.

Ewell played a children's fashion designer in the 2011 Hallmark Channel TV movie, Keeping Up With The Randalls, alongside Thad Luckinbill, Roma Downey, Marion Ross and McKenna Jones. She next appeared on the A&E television series, The Glades, that year, as a waitress suspected of murder in the episode "Beached". In 2012, she guest starred alongside Gabrielle Dennis on the TNT drama, Franklin & Bash, playing a Navy sailor facing a court-martial. Ewell starred opposite Austin Stowell and Danny Glover in the 2013 Hallmark Movie Channel film, Shuffelton’s Barbershop, as Norma, a country music singer and songwriter. The film was named after a 1950s Norman Rockwell painting that featured bluegrass musicians playing in a barbershop.

Ewell starred in the horror film The Demented (2013) alongside Sarah Butler and Michael Welch. She also starred in the 2014 Lifetime movie, Deadly Daycare, with Christy Carlson Romano. In April 2016, Ewell began filming the feature, 2 Years and 8 Days, with Ryan Merriman in New Mexico. The film, retitled 2 Years of Love was released on January 24, 2017.

She portrayed Nora Truman (formerly named Mara) in The CW 2019 television series Roswell, New Mexico. In 2020, Ewell guest starred on CW's Batwoman as the DC comics villain Nocturna.

== Personal life ==
As of 2009, Ewell lives in Los Angeles, California. In 2000 she told Sophisticate magazine that she enjoys painting, rock climbing and rappelling in her free time. She also includes dancing and whitewater rafting among her hobbies. She was on her high school's surfing team.

In May 2015, she got engaged to actor and model Tanner Novlan. The couple married on September 12, 2015.

In March 2019, Ewell announced that she and her husband were expecting their first child. On July 16, 2019, Ewell gave birth to their first child, a daughter. On June 6, 2022, Ewell gave birth to their second child, a son.

== Filmography ==
=== Film ===
Year	Title	Role	Notes
2006	Just My Luck	Janet the Bank Teller	
2006	Material Girls	Fabiella Receptionist	
2008	Senior Skip Day	Cara	Direct-to-video film
2008	Impact Point	Jen Crowe	
2009	Fired Up	Margot Jane Lindsworth-Calligan	
2013	The Demented	Taylor	
2016	Clandestine Dynasty	Agent Carol	Short film; also as associate producer
2017	2 Years of Love	Samantha Grey	
2017	Sweet Sweet Summertime	Jenna Southerland	
2018	A Friend's Obsession	Kate	
2018	The Creatress	Lacey	
2021	Agent II	Billy	post-production

=== Television ===
Year	Title	Role	Notes
2000	Profiler	Faith Cleary	Episode: "The Long Way Home"
2000	Freaks and Geeks	Maureen Sampson	3 episodes
2004	Boston Public	Dianne	2 episodes
2004–2005, 2020-2021	The Bold and the Beautiful	Caitlin Ramirez/Steffy Forrester	Regular role, 135 episodes, Uncredited for Steffy
2005	The O.C.	Casey	3 episodes
2006	Veronica Mars	Angie Dahl	Episode: "I Am God"
2006	Close to Home	Cindy Robinson	Episode: "Homecoming"
2007–2008	Entourage	Amy	3 episodes
2009	Bones	Alyssa Howland	Episode: "The Salt in the Wounds"
2009-2011, 2014, 2017	The Vampire Diaries	Vicki Donovan	Main role (season 1); recurring role (season 3); guest star (seasons 2, 5, 8)
2010	CSI: Crime Scene Investigation	Bettina Clark	Episode: "Take My Life, Please"
2010	Scoundrels	Chantelle Hazenby	Episode: "Birds of a Feather Flock Together"
2010–2011	House	Nika	Episodes: "Small Sacrifices", "Carrot or Stick"
2011	Keeping Up with the Randalls	Alicia Crosby	Television movie
2011	The Glades	Maggie Bauman	Episode: "Beached"
2012	Franklin & Bash	Monica Ward	Episode: "Summer Girls"
2013	Shuffelton’s Barbershop	Norma Cameron	Television movie
2014	Deadly Daycare	Rachel	Television movie
2015	Grandfathered	Maya	Episode: "Dad Face"
2015	How Not to Propose	Lena	Television movie
2015	Lucifer	Amanda Bello	Episode: "Pilot"
2016	The Night Shift	Cristina	Episode: "Trust Issues"
2016	10 Year Reunion	Patty Garner	Television movie
2017	Me and My Grandma	Victoria	Main role
2018	Lethal Admirer	Kate	Television movie
2019-2022	Roswell, New Mexico	Nora Truman	9 episodes
2020	Batwoman	Nocturna / Natalia Knight	Episode: "Drink Me"
2022	The Rookie	Sabrina Fowler	Episode: Long Shot
2023	9-1-1	Blair	Episode: Love is in the Air

=== Music video ===
Year	Title	Artist
2008	"Without You"	Hinder
2010	"Maybe"	Sick Puppies
2017	"Hold On"	Derek Hough
