= Multipolar =

Multipolar or multipolarity can refer to:

- Polarity (international relations)
- Multipolar neuron
- A multipolar language is another term for a pluricentric language, a language which is evolving among native speakers in two or more distinct places or polities.

== See also ==
- Tripolar (disambiguation)
