= Tanner Novlan =

Canadian actor (born 1986)

- Novlan in 2023
- Born: 9 April 1986 (age 40); Edmonton, Alberta, Canada
- Occupations: Actor; model
- Years active: 2009–present
- Height: 1.85 m ( 6 ft 1 in )
- Spouse: Kayla Ewell (m. 2015)
- Children: 2

Tanner Novlan (born 9 April 1986) is a Canadian actor and model. He is best known for playing doctor John "Finn" Finnegan on the American CBS soap opera The Bold and the Beautiful since 2020. He has starred as "Struggling Actor" in Liberty Mutual commercials and as Gregory Manes on The CW's Roswell, New Mexico (2020–2021).

== Early life ==
Tanner Novlan was born on 9 April 1986 in Edmonton, Alberta, to Doug and Coresa (née Vizina) Novlan and raised in Paradise Hill, Saskatchewan. His mother is from Sacramento, California. His Slovene Canadian paternal grandfather, Clem, had a close bond with Novlan, as he was his first grandchild. Novlan is the eldest of three siblings, with a younger sister and brother.

Novlan grew up on his family's farm, and at the age of twelve, he drove a $350,000 combine harvester. During his childhood, Novlan was very athletic and active in hockey, basketball and water-skiing. Upon his arrival in the United States at the age of 21, he worked for a construction company while taking acting classes.

== Career ==
Novlan made his feature film acting debut in the 2009 direct-to-video horror film Maneater and his television acting debut in the eighth episode of Season 6 of Bones. In 2013, he was selected to take part in the ABC Discovers: Los Angeles Talent Showcase and in 2016 starred in the independent feature film Flatbush Luck, which earned him award nominations for Best Actor at that year's FilmOut San Diego and the Hoboken International Film Festival. In addition, he went on to appear in guest roles on many TV shows, most notably Parenthood, Letterkenny and Modern Family.

In 2019, Novlan ascended to prominence by assuming the role of the "Struggling Actor" in a televised advertisement produced by Liberty Mutual. The actor notably mispronounces "Liberty Mutual" as "Liberty Biberty" in the commercial. This particular commercial garnered such widespread amusement and viewership that it remained in regular circulation until the year 2022. In September 2023, a new commercial for the aforementioned insurance company featuring Novlan was unveiled. In January 2026, Novlan was featured in another Liberty Mutual commercial in the "Truth Tellers" ad series, and again in July 2026, when a yellow fuzzy puppet character with a Statue of Liberty crown named Liberty Biberty was introduced as a new mascot for the company. In March 2020, he was cast in the recurring role of Gregory Manes in The CW's Roswell, New Mexico, first appearing near the end of its second season. He reprised his role for the series' third season in 2021.

Entertainment Weekly exclusively reported that Novlan would star in a Hallmark Channel television film Christmas Class Reunion, opposite Aimee Teegarden. The film premiered on 10 December 2022. In September 2024, Novlan was cast in his second Hallmark film, Debbie Macomber's Joyful Mrs. Miracle, scheduled to air on November 28, 2024. Novlan portrayed Austin, the manor's caretaker and Charlotte's (Pascal Lamothe-Kipnes) first love, in a story about three adult siblings returning to their childhood home to fulfill their late grandmother's wishes. In September 2026, Novlan was cast opposite Kristin Cavallari in The Roku Channel's Cowboy Hearts. The film is expected to premiere early 2027.

As for his modeling career, Novlan was managed by the modeling agency Vision (styled as VISION) and modeled in print campaigns for the brands Guess and Tommy Hilfiger.

=== The Bold and the Beautiful ===
In July 2020, Novlan began playing the contract role of Dr. John Finnegan, on the CBS Daytime soap opera The Bold and the Beautiful. It was announced that Novlan had vacated the series in April 2022. Novlan's departure from the role caused a major social media firestorm and uproar. Fans and critics responded negatively to the show's decision to write off Finn and campaigned for the actor's return to the show. Several online petitions were created, as well as the hashtag #SaveFinn across social media platforms including Twitter, and expression of their devastation in soap opera sites' publications polls.

Novlan returned to the series in late May 2022. Viewers witnessed a sudden plot twist, where his character, Finn, was revealed to be alive and that he was still under contract with B&B. Novlan revealed in a later interview on The Talk that he knew the character would be returning from the dead, but contractually kept it secret to prevent it from being spoiled by industry media.

== Personal life ==
In May 2015, Novlan became engaged to American actress Kayla Ewell, whom he met in 2010 on the set of the Australian band Sick Puppies's music video "Maybe". The couple married on 12 September 2015.

On 16 July 2019, Ewell gave birth to their first child, a daughter. On 6 June 2022, Ewell gave birth to their second child, a son.

== Filmography ==
=== Film ===
Key
†	Denotes films that have not yet been released

Year	Title	Role	Notes	Ref.
2009	Maneater	Roger Raintree	Direct-to-video natural horror film	
2010	1313: Giant Killer Bees!	Connor	Sci-fi film	
2016	Flatbush Luck	Jimmy	Comedy-drama film	
2017	Fallen Stars	Ben	Drama film	
2018	Ice: The Movie	Grant	Sports drama film	
2019	My Best Friend's Christmas	Grant Hines	Showtime television film	
2022	Christmas Class Reunion	Devin Ryan	Hallmark Channel television film	
2024	Debbie Macomber's Joyful Mrs. Miracle	Austin	Hallmark Channel television film	
2027	Cowboy Hearts †	Chris	The Roku Channel television film	

=== Television ===
Year(s)	Title	Role	Notes	Ref.
2010	Bones	Paul Linoto	Episode: "The Twisted Bones in the Melted Truck"	
2012	Parenthood	Jake	Episode: "Together"	
2014	Rizzoli & Isles	Wayne Bowman	Episode: "Just Push Play"	
2016–2017	Mohawk Girls	Midas	7 episodes	
2016	Cold	J.J.	GO90 original digital series; 2 episodes	
2017	Letterkenny	Zack Russell Terrier	Episode: "Great Day for Thunder Bay"	
2020	Modern Family	Liam	Season 11 Episode 12: "Dead on a Rival"	
2020–2021	Roswell, New Mexico	Gregory Manes	Recurring role; 9 episodes	
2020–present	The Bold and the Beautiful	John "Finn" Finnegan	Series regular: July 23, 2020–present	

=== Music video ===
Year	Title	Artist
2010	"Maybe"	Sick Puppies

== Awards and nominations ==
List of awards and nominations for Tanner Novlan
Year	Award	Category	Work	Result	Ref.
2016	FilmOut San Diego — Audience Awards	Best Actor	Flatbush Luck	Nominated	
2016	Hoboken International Film Festival	Best Actor in a Feature Film	Flatbush Luck	Nominated	
2021	SoapHub Awards	Favorite The Bold and the Beautiful Actor	The Bold and the Beautiful	Nominated	
2021	SoapHub Awards	Favorite Newcomer	The Bold and the Beautiful	Nominated	
