= Maybe (Sick Puppies song) =

2010 single by Sick Puppies

Single by Sick Puppies

from the album Tri-Polar
- Released: 22 June 2010
- Recorded: 2008–2009
- Genre: Alternative rock; post-grunge
- Length: 3:29 (album version); 3:21 (radio edit)
- Label: Virgin
- Songwriter(s): Shimon Moore; Marti Frederiksen; Emma Anzai
- Producer(s): Rock Mafia; Tim James; Antonina Armato

Sick Puppies singles chronology
"Odd One" (2009)	"Maybe" (2010)	"Riptide" (2011)

"Maybe" is the third single from Sick Puppies' third album Tri-Polar, released on 22 June 2010. A remix version was made for pop radio stations, and the official music video.

The song features a bright sound characteristic of post-grunge.

The song was featured as iTunes' single of the week on the week of December 18–25, 2010.

== Music video ==
The music video was released on 12 October 2010 on Yahoo Music and the official website of Sick Puppies. It shows two people who had had enough of their respective jobs in the middle of nowhere, and they separately move to Venice Beach to improve their lives, and by the end of the video, they meet up. Actors Tanner Novlan and Kayla Ewell play the two people who met each other (coincidentally, they would be married in real life five years later). The video also shows the band playing on a highway. It was directed by Travis Kopach, the performance footage was shot in the Mojave Desert.

== Track listing ==
Promo CD single
No.	Title	Length
1.	"Maybe" (album version)	3:29
2.	"Maybe" (acoustic mix)	3:25
3.	"Maybe" (instrumental)	3:28
4.	"Maybe" (radio remix)	3:21

USA single (CD 1)
No.	Title	Length
1.	"Maybe" (album version)	3:29

USA single (CD 2)
No.	Title	Length
1.	"Maybe" (rock edit 1)	3:25
2.	"Maybe" (rock edit 2)	3:25

== Charts ==
"Maybe" was the band's first song that made it into the Hot 100, peaking at No. 56. It spent five weeks at number one on the Heatseekers chart (which ranks songs by acts that had never reached the top 50 on the Hot 100), making it their second number-one hit. On the Alternative Songs chart, the song peaked at No. 6. It became their first single to reach the Mainstream Top 40 chart, as well as their first international charting single.

=== Weekly charts ===
Chart (2010–2011)	Peak position
Australia (ARIA)	54
Canada (Canadian Hot 100)	99
Netherlands (Dutch Top 40)	24
Netherlands (Single Top 100)	96
UK Singles (OCC)	130
US Billboard Hot 100	56
US Adult Contemporary (Billboard)	27
US Adult Pop Airplay (Billboard)	8
US Pop Airplay (Billboard)	22
US Hot Rock & Alternative Songs (Billboard)	15

=== Year-end charts ===
Chart (2011)	Position
US Adult Top 40 (Billboard)	30

== Certifications ==
Region	Certification	Certified units/sales
Australia (ARIA)	Gold	35,000^{^}
United States (RIAA)	Gold	500,000^{‡}
^{^} Shipments figures based on certification alone.^{‡} Sales+streaming figures based on certification alone.
