= You're Going Down =

2009 single by Sick Puppies

Single by Sick Puppies

from the album Tri-Polar
- Released: 24 May 2009 (digital download); 2 June 2009 (official release)
- Recorded: 2008–09
- Genre: Nu metal; alternative metal
- Length: 3:09
- Label: Virgin
- Songwriter(s): Tim James; Emma Anzai; Shimon Moore; Antonina Armato
- Producer(s): Rock Mafia; Tim James; Antonina Armato

Sick Puppies singles chronology
"Pitiful" (2008)	"You're Going Down" (2009)	"Odd One" (2009)

"You're Going Down" is the lead single from Sick Puppies' third album Tri-Polar.

"You're Going Down" was used by WWE to represent their Extreme Rules pay-per-view event as its official theme song. The wrestling promotion also used the song by making it part of the soundtrack to their video game SmackDown vs. Raw 2010. It was also used in a pre-game video package for the Montreal Alouettes at the 96th Grey Cup and the opening theme for the 2010 live-action film adaptation of Tekken.

The official release date was 2 June 2009 but the band had already begun streaming the song through their Myspace page.

When Moore was asked how he wrote the song his answer was, "I asked myself, when you're getting pumped up to get into the ring, what would you want to hear? And that's what came out".

== Music video ==
The full video for "You're Going Down" premiered on 11 August 2009 on both MTV2 and mtvU, as well as the mtvU website. The next day, it became available for viewing on Sick Puppies Myspace page, as well as their YouTube channel.

To contrast the heavy, aggressive sound of the song, the video features small children throwing water balloons at each other and shooting each other with water guns. The main humor comes from the fact that it is shot in a very serious way, similar to Saving Private Ryan, so that it appears to be a real war. The kids talk on walkie talkies and appear to die as if fighting with real weapons. The video cuts back and forth between this story and scenes of the band performing the song.

== Track listing ==
Promo CD single
No.	Title	Length
1.	"You're Going Down" (radio edit)	3:09
2.	"You're Going Down" (album version)	3:09

== Charts ==
=== Weekly charts ===
Chart (2009)	Peak position
Canada Rock (Billboard)	40
UK Rock & Metal (OCC)	31
US Bubbling Under Hot 100 (Billboard)	8
US Hot Rock & Alternative Songs (Billboard)	8

=== Year-end charts ===
Chart (2009)	Position
US Hot Rock Songs (Billboard)	26
Chart (2010)	Position
US Hot Rock Songs (Billboard)	36

== Certifications ==
Region	Certification	Certified units/sales
New Zealand (RMNZ)	Gold	15,000^{‡}
United States (RIAA)	Platinum	1,000,000^{‡}
^{‡} Sales+streaming figures based on certification alone.
