= Odd One =

Single by Sick Puppies

from the album Tri-Polar
- Released: 10 November 2009 (official release)
- Recorded: 2008–2009
- Genre: Post-grunge; alternative rock
- Length: 3:47
- Label: Virgin
- Songwriter(s): Tim Price; Emma Anzai; Shimon Moore; Antonina Armato
- Producer(s): Rock Mafia; Tim James; Antonina Armato

Sick Puppies singles chronology
"You're Going Down" (2009)	"Odd One" (2009)	"Maybe" (2010)

"Odd One" is the second single from Sick Puppies' third album Tri-Polar, which impacted rock radio on 10 November 2009. According to the band's Twitter, the video was filmed on November 25. According to pictures posted on the band's Twitter and a video clip on YouTube in the following days, the video was filmed at a skate park. In a live web interview on 9 February 2010, vocalist Shimon Moore stated that "Odd One" narrowly beat out "Riptide" as Tri-Polar's second single, much to the delight of the band who supported "Odd One" becoming a single because of its strong lyrical message.

== Music video ==
A trailer for the video can be seen on their YouTube page.

The full video premiere of Odd One was on Wednesday 20 January 2010 on the mtvU website.

The video shows the band performing at a skatepark and a love story. The protagonist of the video is girl who has powers that could kill and bring people back from the dead. Her powers stop her from touching other people so she wears yellow rubber gloves.

== Track listing ==
Promo CD single
No.	Title	Length
1.	"Odd One" (radio album edit)	3:29
2.	"Odd One" (radio edit)	3:21

== Charts ==
=== Weekly charts ===
Chart (2009–2010)	Peak position
Canada Rock (Billboard)	36
US Hot Rock & Alternative Songs (Billboard)	10

=== Year-end charts ===
Chart (2010)	Position
US Hot Rock & Alternative Songs (Billboard)	31
