= Riptide (Sick Puppies song) =

Single by Sick Puppies

from the album Tri-Polar
- Released: 8 February 2011 (official release)
- Recorded: 2008–2009
- Genre: Alternative rock; post-grunge
- Length: 3:10 (album version); 2:59 (radio version)
- Label: Virgin
- Songwriter(s): Tim Price; Emma Anzai; Shimon Moore; Antonina Armato
- Producer(s): Rock Mafia; Tim James; Antonina Armato

Sick Puppies singles chronology
"Maybe" (2010)	"Riptide" (2011)	"There's No Going Back" (2013)

"Riptide" is the fourth single from Sick Puppies' third album Tri-Polar, which impacted radio on 8 February 2011. Originally this song was planned to be the second single, but "Odd One" narrowly beat out "Riptide" because of its strong lyrical message.

== Music video ==
A music video was premiered on 6 April 2011 on Yahoo Music. The video features the band playing in front of a wall of T.V's screening the most shocking breaking news and iniquities in the world. At the end of the video a child turns off the T.V. and it shows a phrase saying: "There is still hope". It was directed by Travis Kopach.

The video went to No. 7 on Yahoo Videos.

== Chart performance ==
"Riptide" debuted at No. 35 on the Mainstream Rock chart and peaked at No. 3; it debut at No. 49 on the Rock Songs chart, where it peaked at No. 6. It debuted at No. 36 on the Alternative Songs chart.

== Track listing ==
Promo CD single
No.	Title	Length
1.	"Riptide"	2:59
2.	"Call Out Hook"	0:13

== Charts ==
=== Weekly charts ===
Chart (2011)	Peak position
US Hot Rock & Alternative Songs (Billboard)	6

=== Year-end charts ===
Chart (2011)	Position
US Hot Rock & Alternative Songs (Billboard)	25

== Certifications ==
Region	Certification	Certified units/sales
United States (RIAA)	Gold	500,000^{‡}
^{‡} Sales+streaming figures based on certification alone.
