= Extreme Rules (2009) =

World Wrestling Entertainment pay-per-view event

- Promotional poster featuring Rey Mysterio
- Promotion: World Wrestling Entertainment
- Brand(s): Raw; SmackDown; ECW
- Date: June 7, 2009
- City: New Orleans, Louisiana
- Venue: New Orleans Arena
- Attendance: 9,124
- Buy rate: 213,000

Pay-per-view chronology
← Previous; Judgment Day	Next → The Bash

Extreme Rules chronology
← Previous; First	Next → 2010

The 2009 Extreme Rules was a professional wrestling pay-per-view (PPV) event produced by World Wrestling Entertainment (WWE). It was the inaugural Extreme Rules and took place on June 7, 2009, at the New Orleans Arena in New Orleans, Louisiana, held for wrestlers from the promotion's Raw, SmackDown, and ECW brand divisions. The theme of the event was that it featured various hardcore-based matches.

The event was initially noted by WWE to be a direct continuation of the One Night Stand chronology and continued its theme of featuring hardcore-based matches; in 2010, however, WWE noted that Extreme Rules was its own chronology, separate from One Night Stand. This would be the only Extreme Rules to feature ECW and the ECW Championship as the brand was disbanded in February 2010, deactivating the championship along with it.

There were eight matches scheduled on the event's card, though nine actually took place, and there was one dark match that occurred before the live broadcast. Six of the televised matches were contested under a hardcore stipulation. The main event was a Ladder match for SmackDown's World Heavyweight Championship, which saw Jeff Hardy defeat Edge to win the title. After the match, CM Punk cashed in his Money in the Bank contract, which guaranteed him a title match at the time and place of his choosing, and defeated Hardy to win the title. There were also two other highly publicized matches; the first was a Steel Cage match for Raw's WWE Championship between the champion Randy Orton and Batista, as well as a submission match between Big Show and John Cena. Featured matches on the undercard included a triple threat Hardcore match for the ECW Championship, a No Holds Barred match between Rey Mysterio and Chris Jericho for SmackDown's Intercontinental Championship, and CM Punk versus Umaga in a Samoan Strap match. This was Umaga's last match in WWE, who was released from WWE in the following day.

The event had 213,000 buys, up from the One Night Stand 2008 figure of 194,000 buys.

== Production ==
=== Background ===
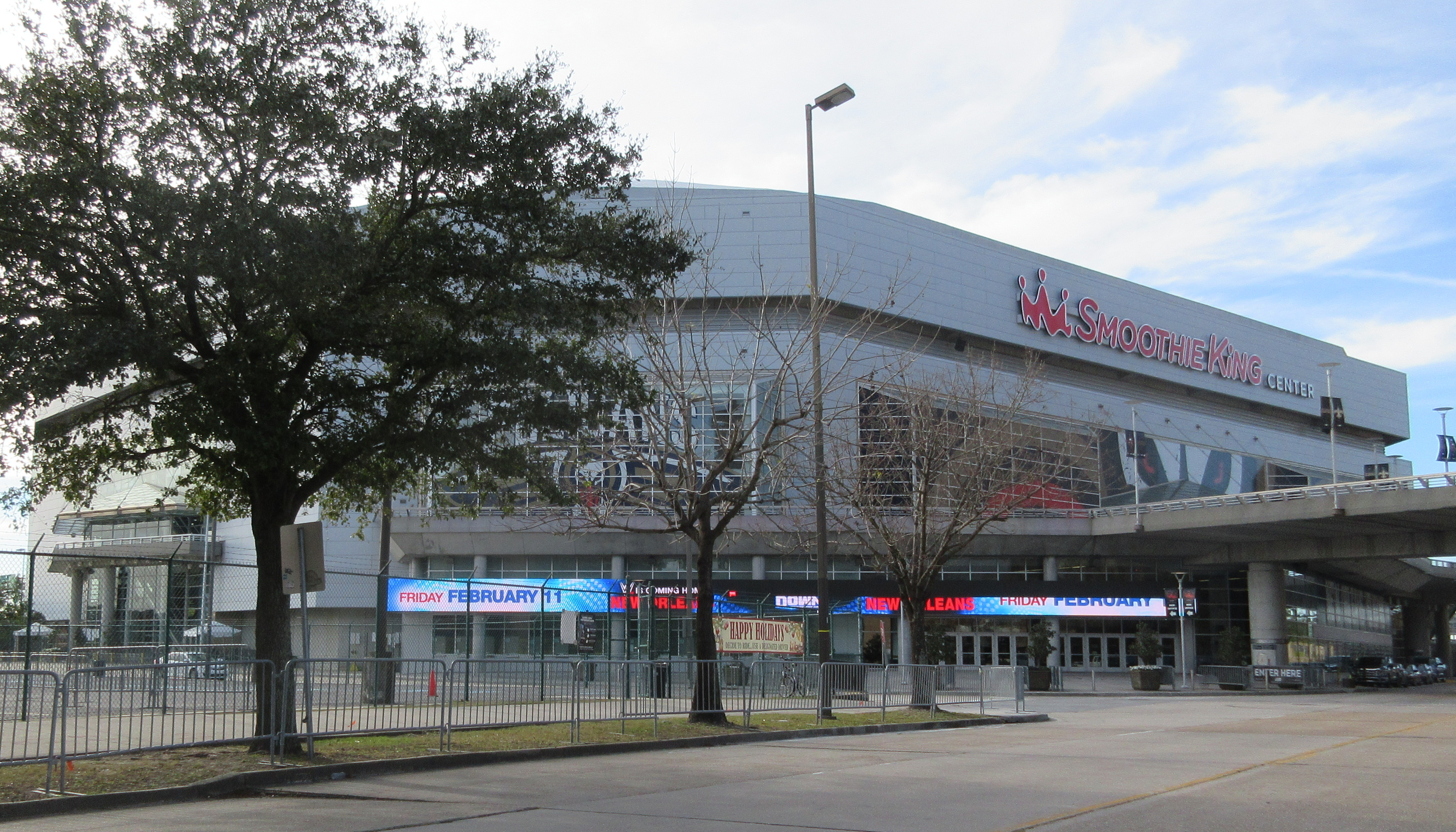
The inaugural Extreme Rules was held at the New Orleans Arena in New Orleans, Louisiana.

From 2005 to 2008, World Wrestling Entertainment (WWE) ran a professional wrestling pay-per-view (PPV) event entitled One Night Stand. While the first two events were originally a reunion show for the defunct Extreme Championship Wrestling (ECW) promotion, the assets of which WWE acquired in 2003, the concept of One Night Stand was that the event featured various matches that were contested under hardcore rules. In 2009, Extreme Rules was established to replace One Night Stand and was initially noted by WWE to be a direct continuation of the One Night Stand chronology, with Extreme Rules continuing the concept of featuring hardcore-based matches. ECW originally used the "extreme rules" term to describe the regulations for all of its matches; WWE adopted the term and has since used it in place of "hardcore match" or "hardcore rules". The inaugural Extreme Rules event took place on June 7, 2009, at the New Orleans Arena in New Orleans, Louisiana and featured wrestlers from the Raw, SmackDown, and ECW brands.

=== Storylines ===
The professional wrestling matches at Extreme Rules involved professional wrestlers performing as characters in scripted events pre-determined by the hosting promotion, WWE. Results were predetermined by WWE's writers on the Raw, SmackDown, and ECW brands, while storylines were produced on WWE's weekly television shows, Monday Night Raw, Friday Night SmackDown, ECW on Sci Fi, and Superstars.

The primary rivalry heading into Extreme Rules from the Raw brand was between Randy Orton and Batista, who were feuding over the WWE Championship. At WWE's previous pay-per-view event, Judgment Day, Orton lost his match against Batista by getting himself intentionally disqualified for hitting the referee, but retained the WWE Championship. As a result, on the May 18 episode of Raw, Ric Flair, an associate of Batista, announced that the Raw general manager, Vickie Guerrero, had decided that Orton was to face Batista in a Steel Cage match at Extreme Rules, once again defending his WWE Championship.

Another rivalry from the Raw brand was between John Cena and Big Show. At WWE's April pay-per-view, Backlash, Big Show interfered in Cena's Last Man Standing match against Edge and chokeslammed him though a spotlight, causing Cena to lose the match and the World Heavyweight Championship to Edge; Cena exacted revenge at Judgment Day with a pinfall victory over Big Show. Then, on the May 18 episode of Raw, it was announced Big Show would have a rematch with Cena at Extreme Rules in a submission match.

The main rivalry heading into Extreme Rules from the SmackDown brand was between Edge and Jeff Hardy over the World Heavyweight Championship. After Edge retained the championship against Jeff Hardy at Judgment Day, Theodore Long, the SmackDown general manager, announced on the May 22 episode of SmackDown that, due to Matt Hardy's interference in the title match at Judgment Day, Jeff Hardy was to receive a rematch against Edge, to be contested at Extreme Rules, with the stipulation being chosen by winner of the match between the two later in the night; Hardy won the match, and chose a ladder match.

After defeating CM Punk at Judgment Day, Umaga continued to attack Punk, and interfered in Punk's match with Chris Jericho on the May 22 episode of SmackDown, assaulting him with a leather strap, and issuing a challenge to Punk for what he called a Samoan strap match at Extreme Rules.

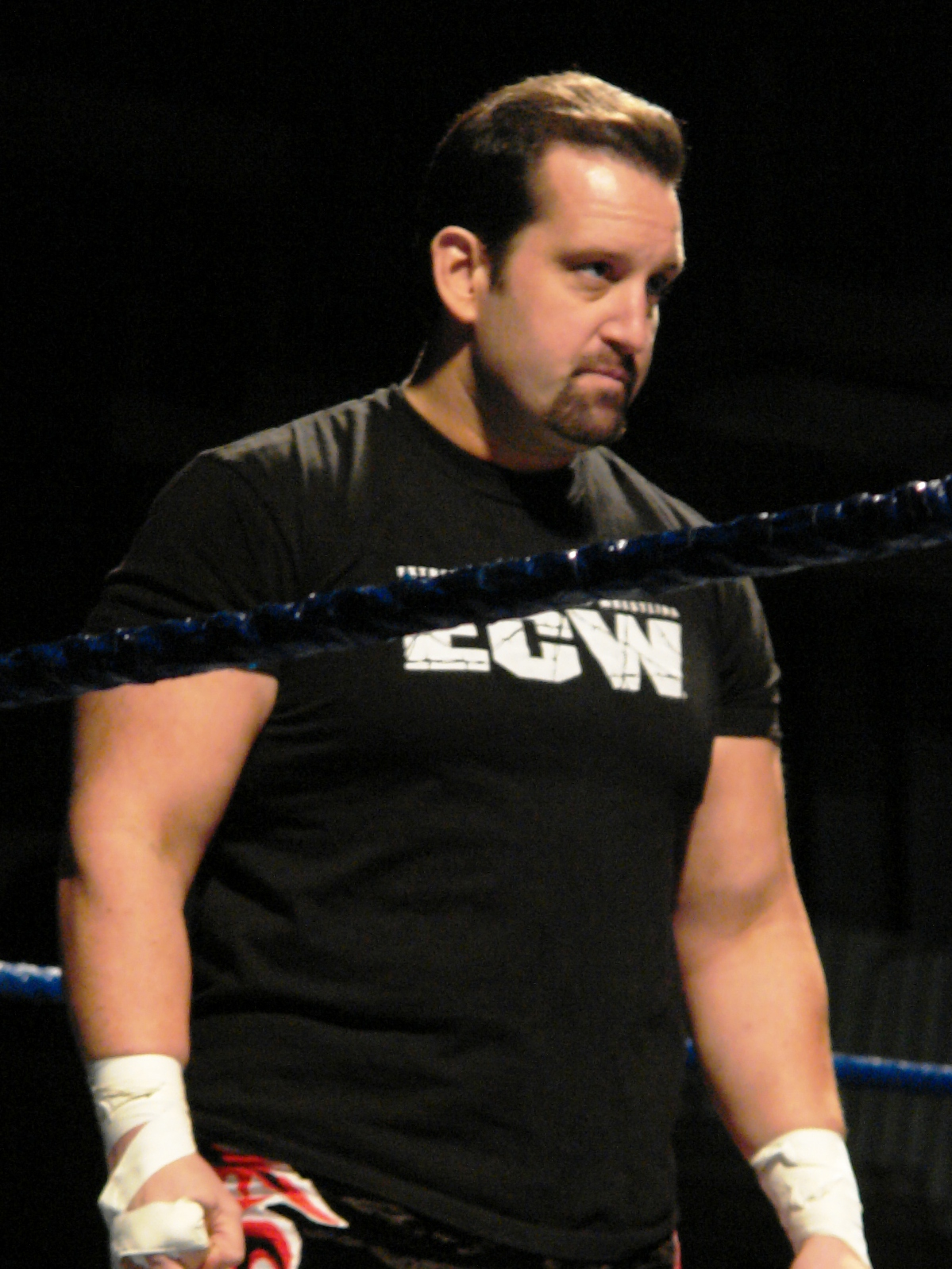
Tommy Dreamer, who won the ECW Championship in a triple threat match.

The primary rivalry from the ECW brand was between Christian, Jack Swagger, and Tommy Dreamer, vying over Christian's ECW Championship. After Christian retained the ECW Championship against the former champion, Jack Swagger, at Judgment Day, Swagger attacked Christian on the following episode of ECW and pushed him off the entrance ramp. Two days later, on Superstars, Swagger interfered in a title match between Christian and Dreamer, resulting in the match being ruled a no contest. On the May 26 episode of ECW, Swagger announced that Christian would be defending the championship against him again at Extreme Rules, but the ECW general manager, Tiffany, stated that Dreamer had been added to the match, making it a triple threat hardcore match. As Dreamer's contract with the company expired one day before the show, it was announced that he had signed a one-day extension to give him a chance at winning the title; if Dreamer were to fail to win the title, he would no longer wrestle for ECW.

== Event ==
Other on-screen personnel
Role:	Name:
English commentators	Michael Cole (Raw)
English commentators	Jerry Lawler (Raw)
English commentators	Jim Ross (SmackDown)
English commentators	Todd Grisham (SmackDown)
English commentators	Josh Mathews (ECW)
English commentators	Matt Striker (ECW)
Spanish commentators	Carlos Cabrera
Spanish commentators	Hugo Savinovich
Interviewers	Josh Mathews
Ring announcers	Lilian Garcia (Raw)
Ring announcers	Justin Roberts (SmackDown)
Ring announcers	Tony Chimel (ECW)
Ring announcers	Jerry Lawler (Hog Pen Match)
Referees	Charles Robinson
Referees	Mike Chioda
Referees	Scott Armstrong
Referees	Jack Doan
Referees	Marty Elias
Referees	Chad Patton

=== Dark match ===
Before the show aired live, the crowd in attendance witnessed an untelevised match between the team of Mickie James and Kelly Kelly against that of Beth Phoenix and her storyline intern, Rosa Mendes. The former team won the match after James pinned Mendes.

=== Preliminary matches ===
The show started with a fatal four-way match for the WWE United States Championship pitting defending champion, Kofi Kingston against Matt Hardy, William Regal, and Montel Vontavious Porter (MVP). The match was fought at a quick pace that initially had Kingston and MVP work as a unit to eliminate the factor of their opponents. As the match progressed, Regal threw his opponents with exploder suplexes and heavy knee strikes before being countered by Kingston, who rebounded off the ropes, and retaliated against his opponent with Trouble in Paradise to get the pin to retain the title.

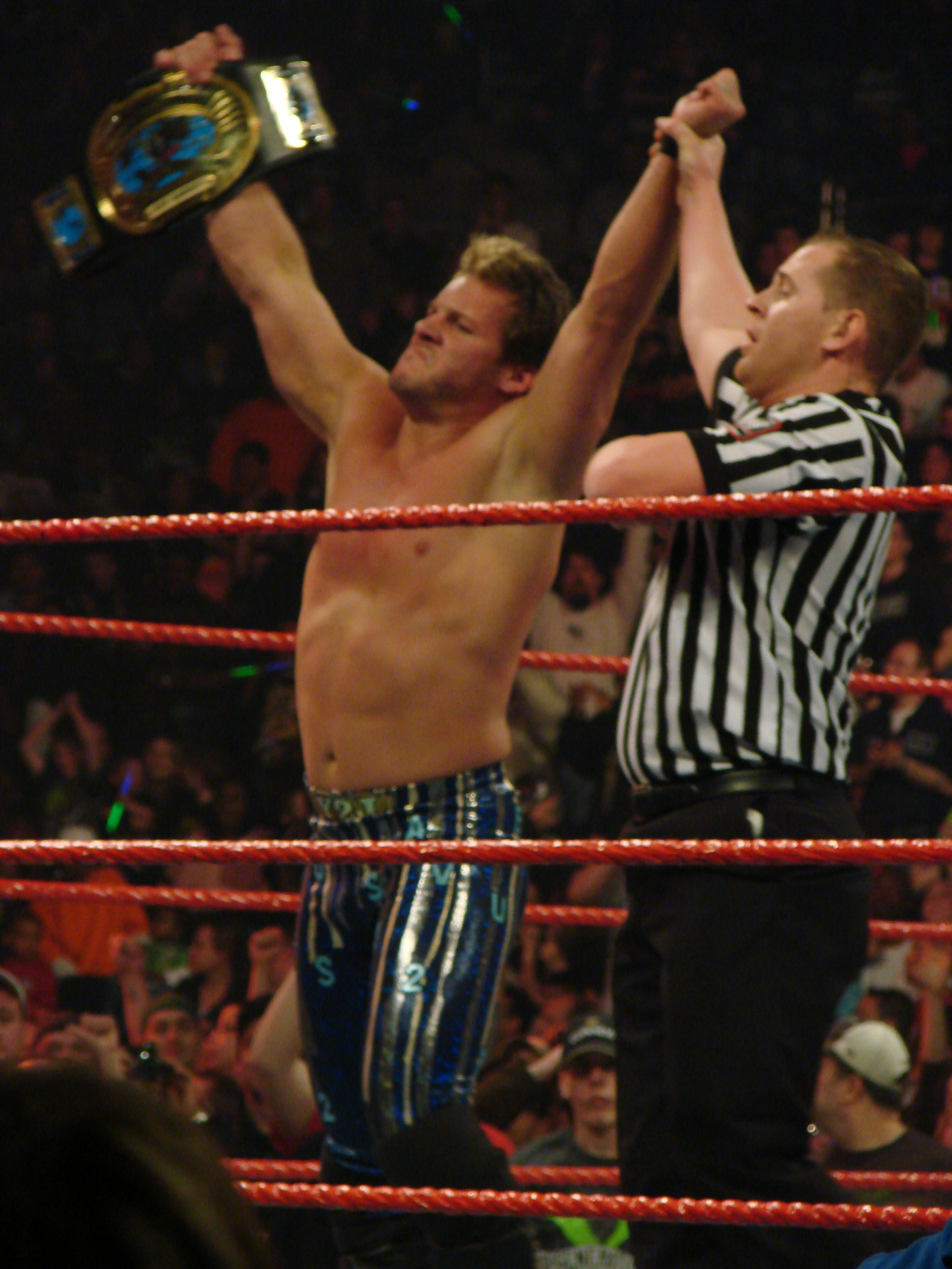
Chris Jericho became a record-setting nine-time Intercontinental Champion.

The following match was a No Holds Barred match between Rey Mysterio and Chris Jericho for the WWE Intercontinental Championship held by Mysterio. Prior to the match, Jericho entered through the crowd, insulting the fans and threatening those who touched him before being immediately assaulted by his opponent. The two fought outside of the ring on the floor of the arena with Mysterio diving over the top rope onto Jericho who was still out of the ring. Jericho gained an advantage by attempting to remove Mysterio's mask, only to fail and have Mysterio throw him out of the ring to dive through the ropes onto his prone opponent. As the action made its way back into the ring, Mysterio attempted another dive only to have Jericho counter it with a Codebreaker. Jericho left the ring to get a folding chair from the corner of the ring. When he attempted to hit Mysterio with it, Mysterio quickly kicked the chair into Jericho's face. After further attacks with the chair, Jericho halted Mysterio's momentum with his signature submission hold, the Walls of Jericho. Mysterio managed to obtain the chair in the ring, and deliver one last hit to Jericho's face to stop the hold before he attempted the 619; Jericho caught him and removed his mask before getting a quick cover to pin his opponent to win the Intercontinental title for the record setting 9th time.

CM Punk and Umaga then fought in the Samoan Strap match, which could only be won by touching all four corners of the ring in succession whilst tethered to each other by the wrist with a leather strap. Punk got an early advantage by quickly touching three corners only to have Umaga use the strap, and pull his opponent towards him and neutralized his attempt before making one of his own to similar results as Punk pulled him over the top rope with him onto the floor. After continued attempts for the win, Punk touched three corners again before being blocked by his opponent, which led to Punk delivering a Go To Sleep, and touching the fourth turnbuckle.

Next was the Triple Threat Hardcore Rules match for the ECW Championship between the champion Christian, Jack Swagger, and Tommy Dreamer. The stipulation is that if Dreamer failed to win the title, he would no longer wrestle for ECW. The match had several weapons in use from around the ring, which had Dreamer and Christian proceeded to hit Swagger repeatedly with kendo sticks and trash can lids. The action fell to the outside, which led to Dreamer obtain a trash can lid to put over his shoulders, and dove onto his two opponents with a senton flip. Once the three returned to the ring, Swagger positioned Dreamer onto the top rope, only to have Christian position himself under Swagger, and executed a powerbomb to Swagger as Swagger superplexed Dreamer. Dreamer delivered a DDT to Swagger to get the pinfall victory and the title.

The following match was a Hog Pen match between Raw general manager, Vickie Guerrero, and Santina Marella (Santino Marella, in reality, posing as his fictitious twin sister) for Guerrero's title of Miss WrestleMania. It was later announced Guerrero would have her nephew, Chavo Guerrero Jr., involved in the match on her behalf. Chavo and Marella brawled in a pen full of mud. The match ended after Marella knocked out Chavo, and pinned an incapacitated Vickie to win the title of Miss WrestleMania. As the Guerreros made their way back to their office, Vickie's storyline husband, Edge, was waiting for them; Edge and Vickie had a verbal confrontation, leading to Edge saying he was divorcing Vickie.

=== Main event matches ===
The next match was Randy Orton defending the WWE Championship against Batista in a Steel Cage match. From the start, Orton made numerous attempts to escape the cage, only to be brought back into the ring by the challenger. Batista then attempted his finishing move, the Batista Bomb, only to have Orton escape, and attempted the RKO; once that effort was stopped by his opponent, Orton made another climb over the cage, only to have Batista deliver a Batista Bomb to get the pinfall, winning the WWE Championship for the first time.

The following match featured John Cena versus Big Show in a submission match. The match started at a slow pace as both men attempted to apply submission holds. Big Show gained an early advantage by grounding his opponent with heavy punches, headbutts, and a full nelson. Cena recovered with some attempts of his own, only to have Big Show stop them, and proceed to apply more submission holds. The momentum shifted after Cena avoided an attempt at Big Show's chokeslam, and delivered an Attitude Adjustment. Cena went to apply the STF, but was unable to apply due to Big Show's size. He then slid his opponent to the ropes to wrap his opponent's leg, so he could apply a sleeper hold. After struggling to escape, Big Show eventually tapped out, thus ending the match.

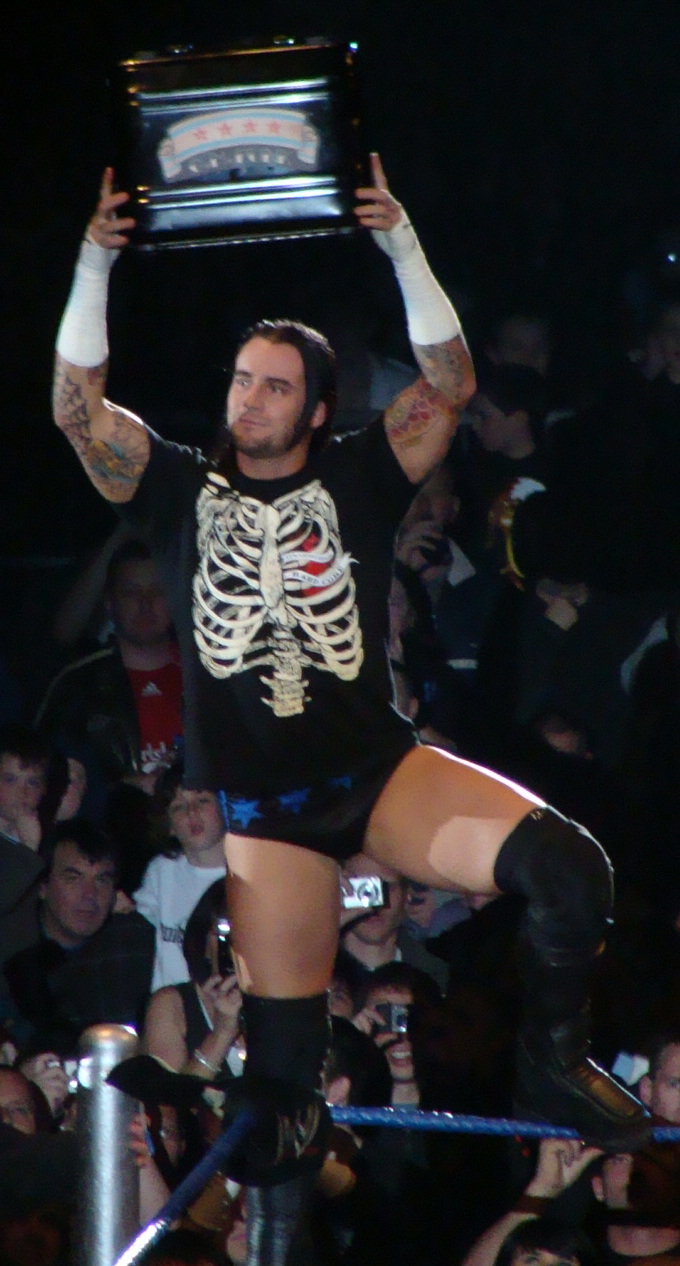
CM Punk cashed in his Money in the Bank contract for a guaranteed world title match at a time and place of his choosing, using it after the main event to win SmackDown's World Heavyweight Championship from Jeff Hardy, who had just won the title from Edge

The main event saw Edge defend the World Heavyweight Championship against Jeff Hardy in a ladder match. The action started outside of the ring as both men jockeyed for control of the ladders. The two made early attempts at climbing the ladder to obtain the title, only to be stopped. The ladders soon came into play as weapons, as Hardy dropkicked a ladder into Edge's face as he was seated in the corner of the ring; as Edge recovered, he placed Hardy into the ladder, and applied a sharpshooter. As the two descended back out to the floor, Edge propped up a ladder between the ring and the barricade, allowing Hardy an attempt to attack Edge from atop another ladder with it only to have Edge run up the ladder that held Hardy only to have the ladder tip over, and both men fell through the ladder propped up on the barricade. When the action got back into the ring, Hardy climbed a ladder set up in an attempt to grab the title, but Edge climbed as well, and knocked him off as Hardy pulled Edge's legs through the rungs, trapping him, as Hardy climbed the ladder and retrieved the belt to win the World Heavyweight Championship.

As Hardy celebrated his championship victory, CM Punk came down to the ring with his Money in the Bank briefcase he won at WrestleMania 25, which guaranteed a title match opportunity at the time of his choosing. He invoked his title match against Hardy, which was ordered to start immediately. After hitting the GTS twice, Punk pinned Hardy, capturing the World Heavyweight Championship for the second time.

== Reception ==
Extreme Rules was attended live at the New Orleans Arena by 9,124 people. It garnered 213,000 pay-per-view buys, an increase from One Night Stand 2008's figure of 194,000 buys.

The show received mixed reviews from fans and critics. Bryan Alvarez of the Wrestling Observer Newsletter gave a live report of show, reporting on the action as it transpired; he expressed positives for the show including the Intercontinental title match, calling the end "the perfect finish", as well as giving a favorable review of the ladder match. James Caldwell, the assistant editor of the wrestling newsletter Pro Wrestling Torch, referred to the ladder match as "epic", saying both men told a great story, then commented on the intrigue of Punk's surprise title win. He also offered praise for the post-match celebration of Tommy Dreamer. J.D. Dunn of 411Mania praised the event and gave the main event ladder match their highest ratings of 4 stars out of 5.

The show also was criticized for a number of reasons. Alvarez expressed his great disdain for the length and flaws of the submission match by saying: "It has been going on forever, it's the same match we see every time just without pinfalls". Matt Mackinder wrote a review for the Canadian Online Explorer website, in which he called the show an "extreme disappointment", giving it a total rating of 4/10. Mackinder's criticism focused on the unoriginality of the show, and the event not being extreme enough to match the pay-per-view's title of "Extreme Rules".

== Aftermath ==
=== Raw ===
The following episode of Raw saw Randy Orton and his protégés, Cody Rhodes and Ted DiBiase (collectively known as The Legacy), exact revenge on Batista by assaulting him, forcing him to vacate the WWE title (in reality, Batista had suffered a legitimate tear in his Biceps brachii muscle, sidelining him for four months); Triple H made his return that night, attacking The Legacy, leading to a fatal four-way match between Orton, Triple H, John Cena, and The Big Show. Orton won the match, only to have Triple H be named number one contender after winning a 10-man battle royal by last eliminating Cena.

=== SmackDown ===
Following CM Punk's World Heavyweight Championship win at Extreme Rules, Punk was confronted by both Jeff Hardy and Edge over the circumstances in which he had won title. He had his first title defense on the June 15 episode of Raw against both former champions in a successful effort before Theodore Long announced Punk was to defend against Hardy at The Bash.

With Chris Jericho winning the WWE Intercontinental Championship, he continued to abhor the behavior of Rey Mysterio, carrying his mask as a trophy; the following week on SmackDown had Mysterio interfere in Jericho's match against CM Punk before challenging the champion for the title at The Bash, wagering his mask for the title.

=== Future ===
The 2009 Extreme Rules pay-per-view became the inaugural event of an annual gimmick pay-per-view for WWE. The 2009 event would also be the only Extreme Rules to include the ECW brand as the brand was disbanded in February 2010. Beginning with the 2010 event, Extreme Rules generally features one Extreme Rules match; only the 2009, 2011, and 2015 events have not featured the namesake match. In 2020, due to the COVID-19 pandemic, which resulted in the event being held behind closed doors, that year's event was titled as The Horror Show at Extreme Rules. Extreme Rules was discontinued after the 2022 event, as Chief Content Officer Triple H stated that he wanted to discontinue some of the gimmick events.

== Results ==
No.	Results	Stipulations	Times
1^{D}	Kelly Kelly and Mickie James defeated Beth Phoenix and Rosa Mendes by pinfall	Tag team match	15:24
2	Kofi Kingston (c) defeated MVP, William Regal, and Matt Hardy by pinfall	Fatal four-way match for the WWE United States Championship	6:42
3	Chris Jericho defeated Rey Mysterio (c) by pinfall	No Holds Barred match for the WWE Intercontinental Championship	14:43
4	CM Punk defeated Umaga	Samoan Strap match	8:59
5	Tommy Dreamer defeated Jack Swagger and Christian (c) by pinfall	Triple threat hardcore match for the ECW Championship; Had Dreamer failed to win the title, he would have no longer wrestled for ECW.	9:38
6	Santina Marella defeated Chavo Guerrero and Vickie Guerrero (c) by pinfall	Handicap Hog Pen match for the title of "Miss WrestleMania"	2:43
7	Batista defeated Randy Orton (c) by pinfall	Steel Cage match for the WWE Championship	7:03
8	John Cena defeated Big Show	Submission match	19:06
9	Jeff Hardy defeated Edge (c)	Ladder match for the World Heavyweight Championship	20:07
10	CM Punk defeated Jeff Hardy (c) by pinfall	Singles match for the World Heavyweight Championship; This was CM Punk's Money in the Bank cash-in match.	1:02
(c) / – the champion(s) heading into the match; D / – this was a dark match
