= Teen Wolf season 1 =

Teen Wolf
- Season 1
- DVD cover
- Starring: Tyler Posey; Crystal Reed; Dylan O'Brien; Tyler Hoechlin; Holland Roden; Colton Haynes
- No. of episodes: 12

Release
- Original network: MTV
- Original release: June 5 – August 15, 2011

Season chronology
- Next → Season 2

The first season of Teen Wolf, an American supernatural drama, was developed by Jeff Davis based upon the 1985 film of the same name, premiered on June 5, 2011, and concluded on August 15, 2011, on the MTV network. The season featured 12 episodes.

== Plot ==
Scott McCall (Tyler Posey), is an average teenager suffering from asthma and living with his single mother in Beacon Hills. One night, he and his best friend Stiles Stilinski (Dylan O'Brien), the son of the local sheriff, Sheriff Stilinski (Linden Ashby), learn about half a corpse found by police in the woods. The two set out to find the other half, but Scott is attacked and bitten by a werewolf. With his new-found lycanthropy, Scott gains supernatural abilities, such as enhanced speed and heightened senses, enabling him to excel as the captain of his Beacon Hills High School lacrosse team. He gains respect from popular girl, Lydia Martin (Holland Roden) and the envy of her lacrosse-playing boyfriend Jackson Whittemore (Colton Haynes). Scott also develops a romantic relationship with school newcomer, Allison Argent (Crystal Reed); however, he discovers her father Chris Argent (JR Bourne) is a werewolf hunter.

Scott and Stiles meet Beta werewolf Derek Hale (Tyler Hoechlin), whose family perished in flames during a mysterious house fire 6 years previously. They uncover the second half of the missing corpse and discover it is Derek's sister, Laura Hale. Scott learns the Alpha werewolf, the most powerful of all wolves, is on a murdering spree and was responsible for biting him. Realizing the consequences and dangers of his new life, he is forced to protect his peers and loved ones, including his girlfriend Allison, who does not know she belongs to a family of werewolf hunters.

Allison's cruel werewolf-hunter aunt, Kate Argent (Jill Wagner), arrives into town. Derek suspects Scott's mysterious veterinarian boss, Dr. Alan Deaton (Seth Gilliam) is the Alpha, but after it is confirmed that he is not, Alan concedes he is aware of the supernatural world and becomes Scott's ally. Jackson learns Scott is a werewolf and devises a plan to become a werewolf himself to rival Scott's success at lacrosse. The Alpha werewolf is revealed to be Derek's uncle, Peter Hale (Ian Bohen), who was the only survivor of the fire. Kate reveals to Derek that it was she who started the fire, and she also reveals the existence of werewolves to Allison.

Chris Argent finds out that Scott is a werewolf, but realizes he is innocent. Peter bites Lydia, who becomes catatonic, and it later turns out that she is mysteriously immune to the bite. Allison discovers that Scott is a werewolf, but this does not change her romantic feelings about him. Derek finds out that Peter had killed Laura (his niece) to become an Alpha werewolf. Allison sees that her aunt Kate is actually cruel and remorseless, and Peter gains revenge for the fire that killed his family by finally killing Kate. However, Derek kills Peter, and becomes the new Alpha werewolf. At the end, Jackson demands Derek bite him and Derek complies.

Adrian Harris (Adam Fristoe), Coach Bobby Finstock (Orny Adams), Danny Mahealani (Keahu Kahuanui), Melissa McCall (Melissa Ponzio) and Victoria Argent (Eaddy Mays) also appear during the season.

== Cast ==
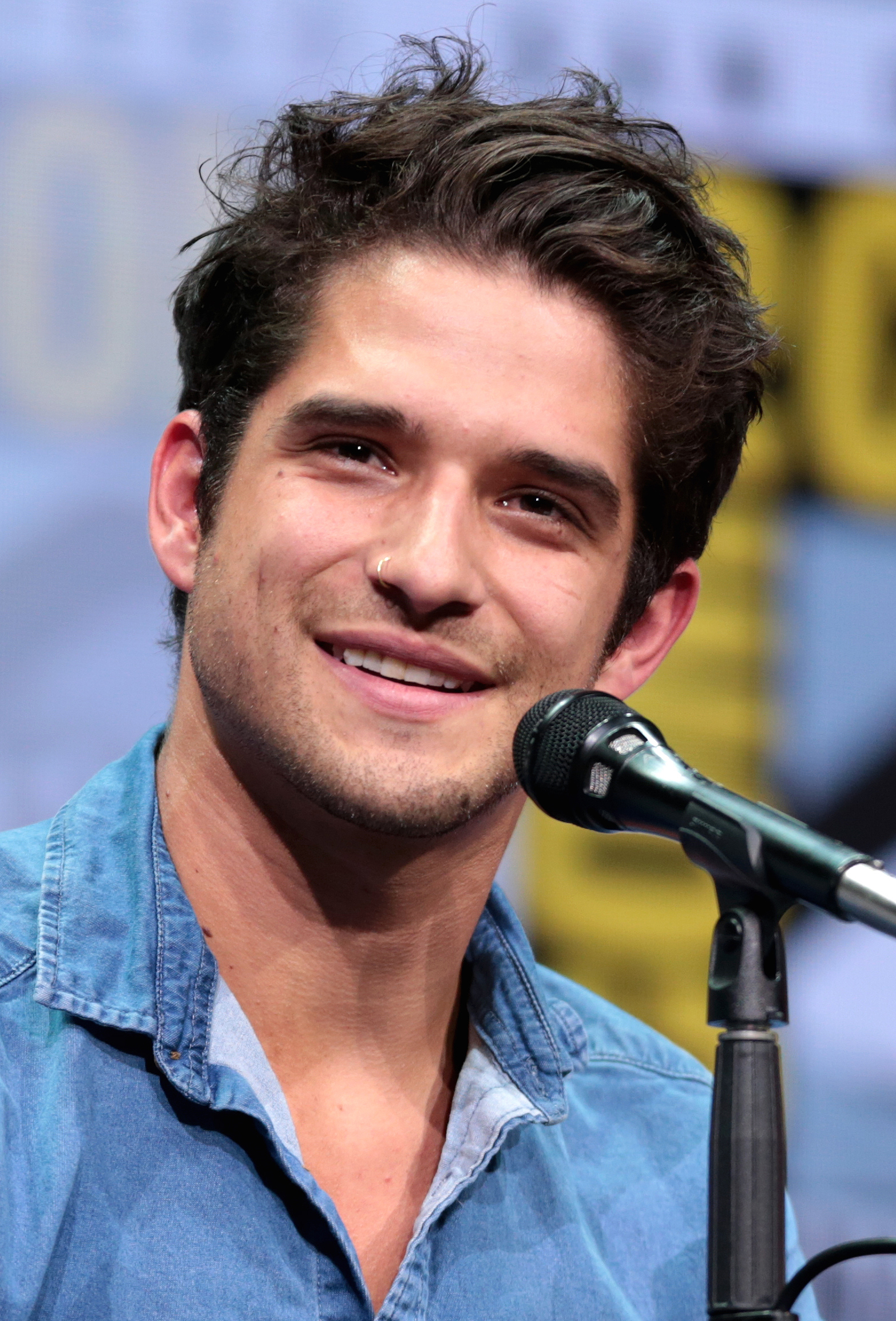
Tyler Posey
(Scott McCall)

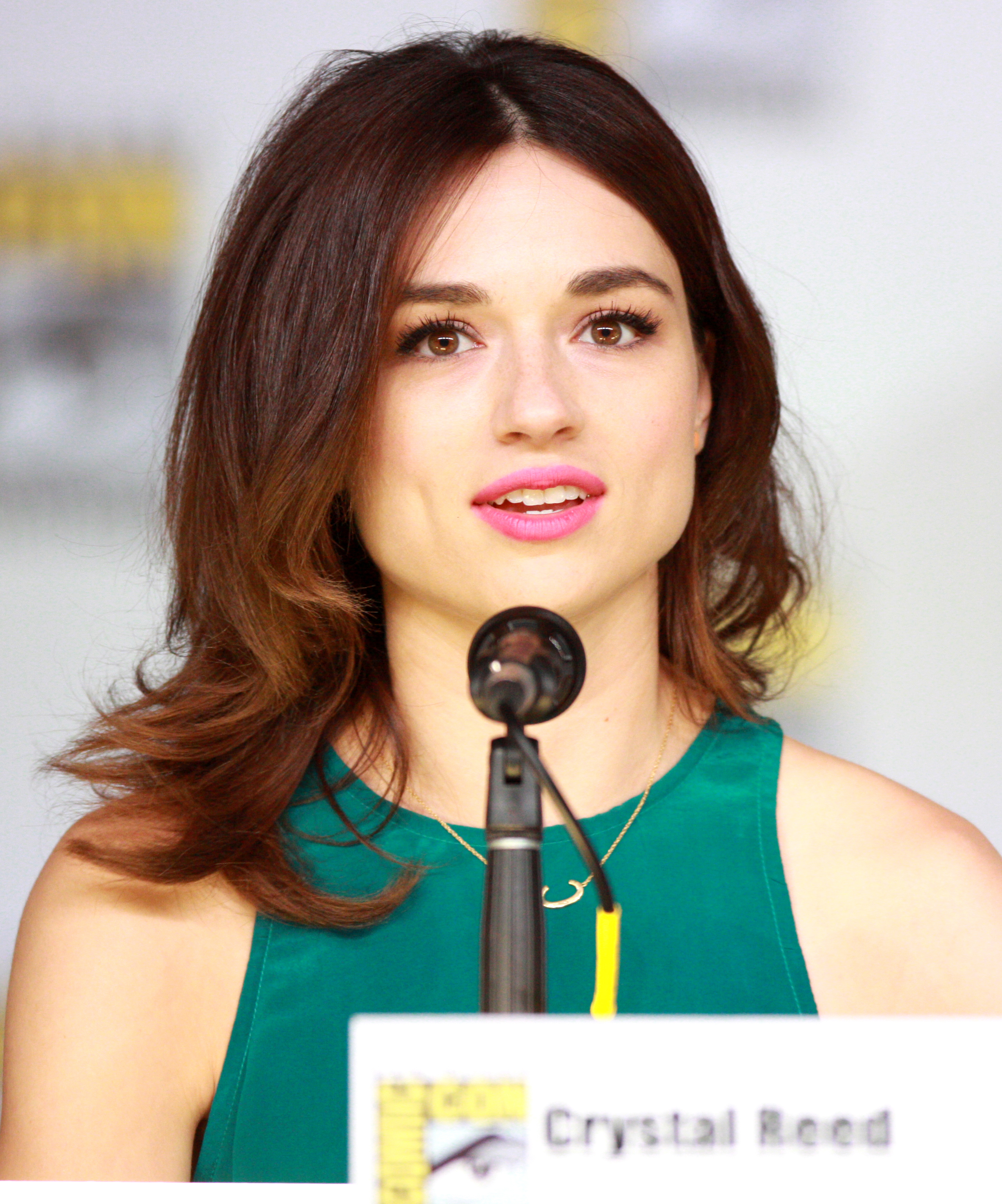
Crystal Reed
(Allison Argent)

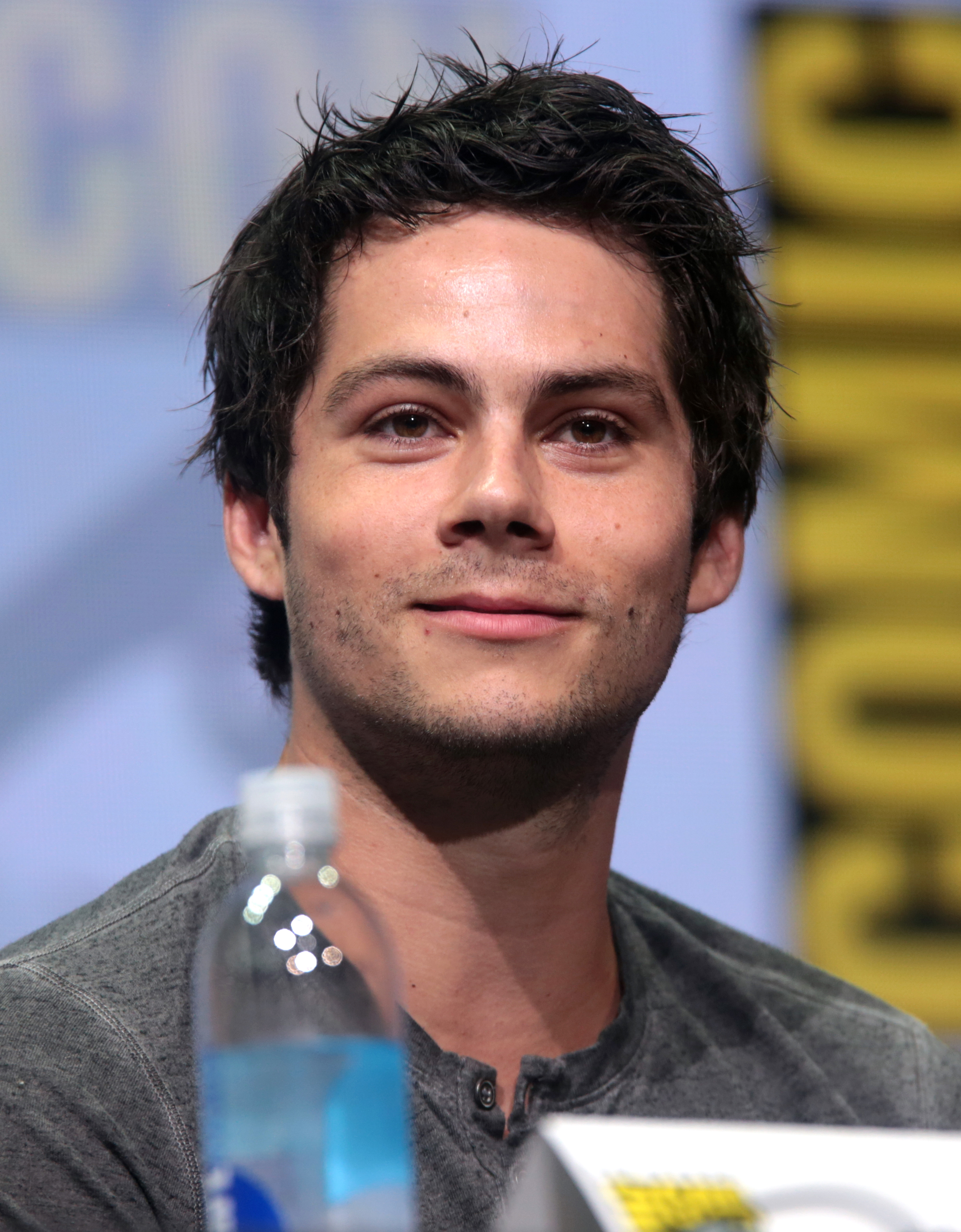
Dylan O'Brien
(Stiles Stilinski)

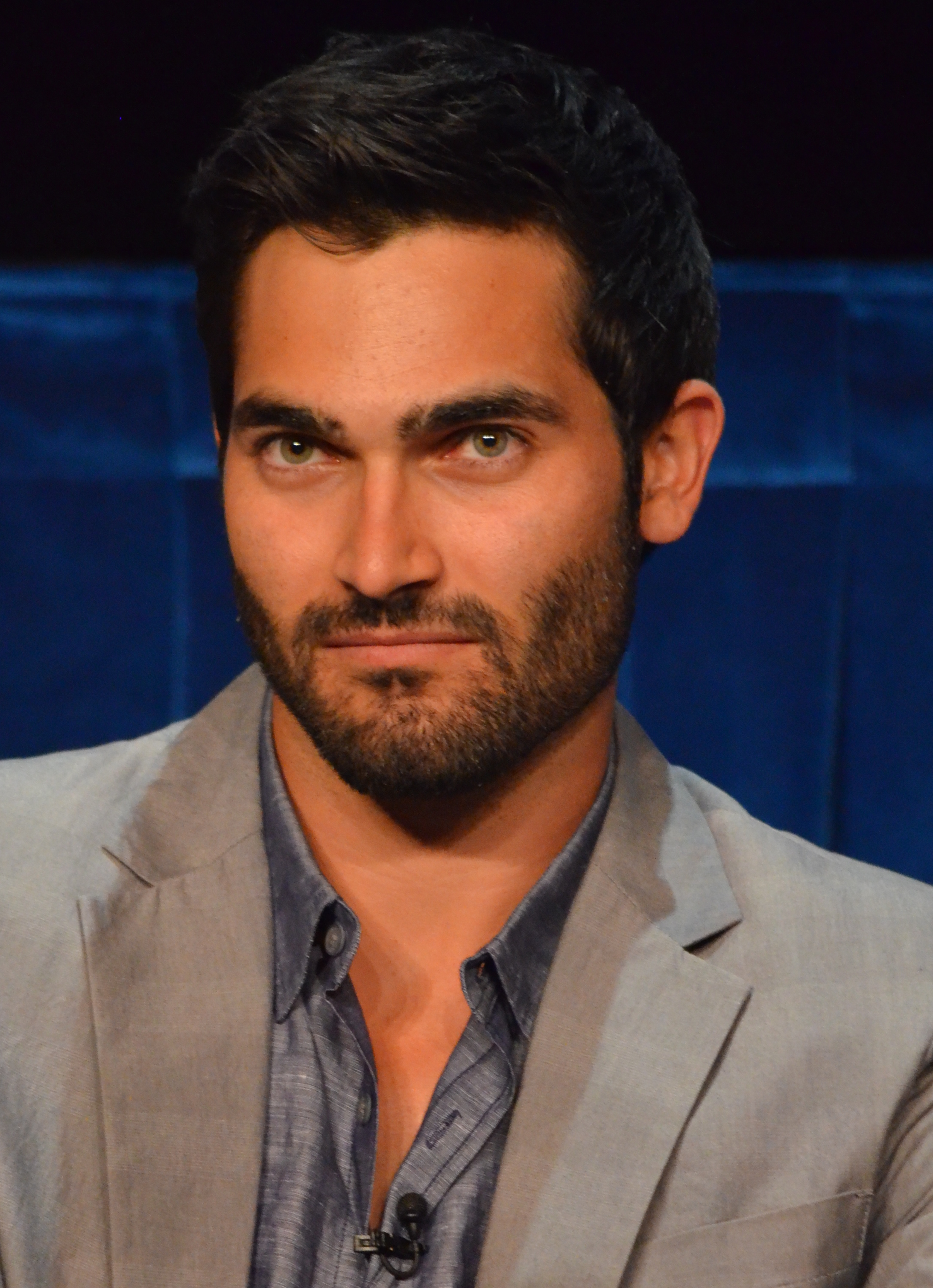
Tyler Hoechlin
(Derek Hale)

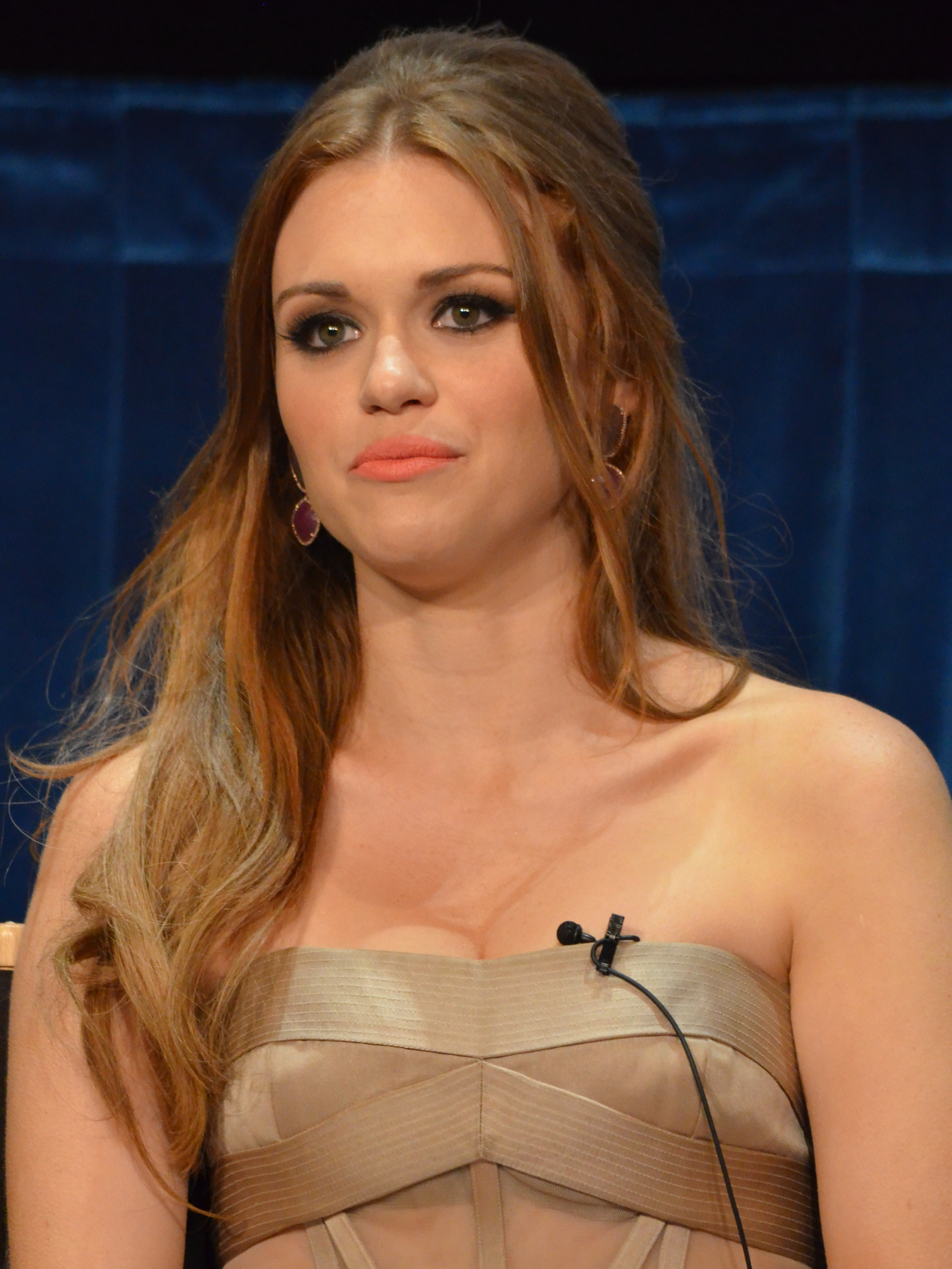
Holland Roden
(Lydia Martin)

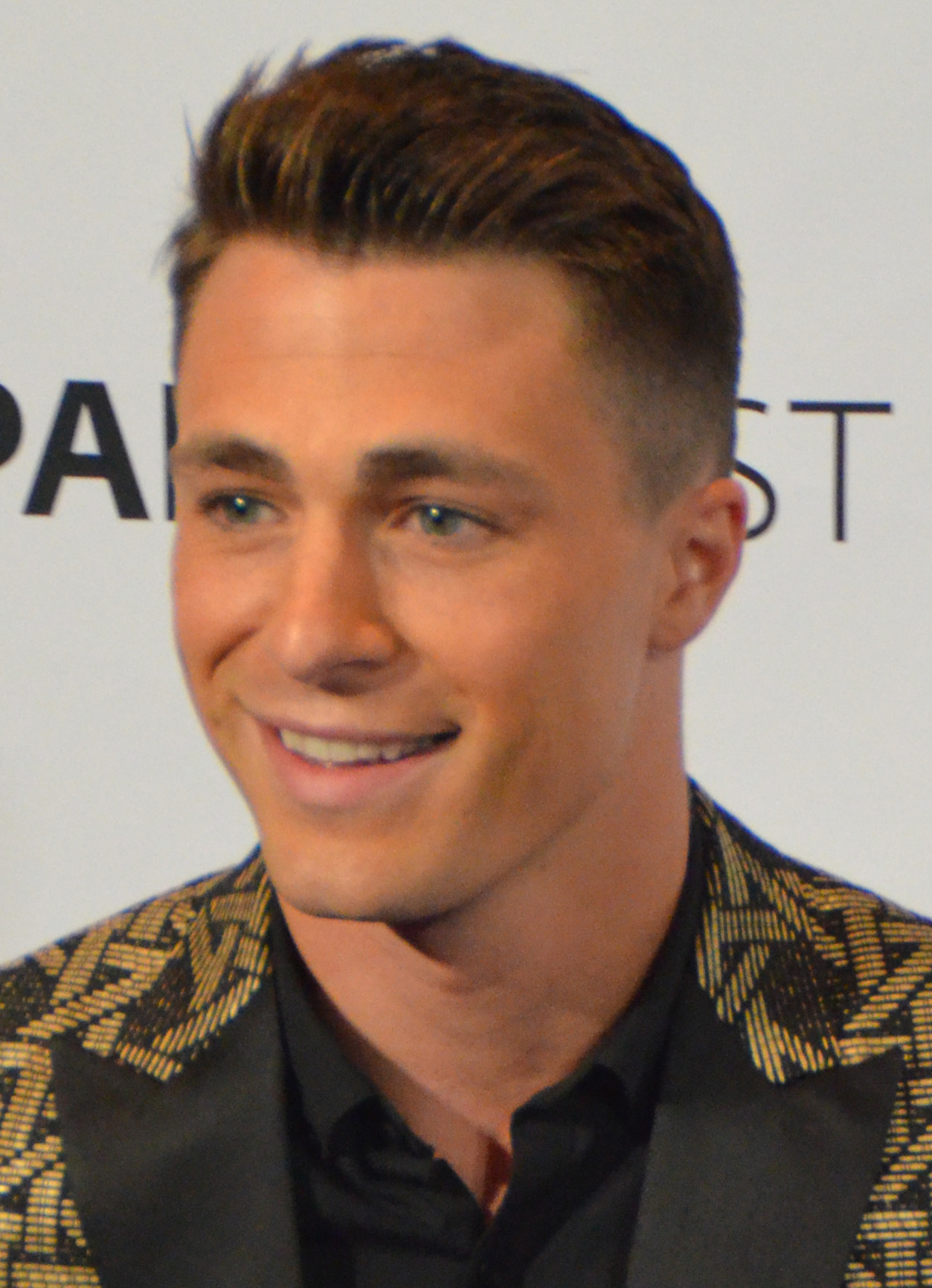
Colton Haynes
(Jackson Whittemore)

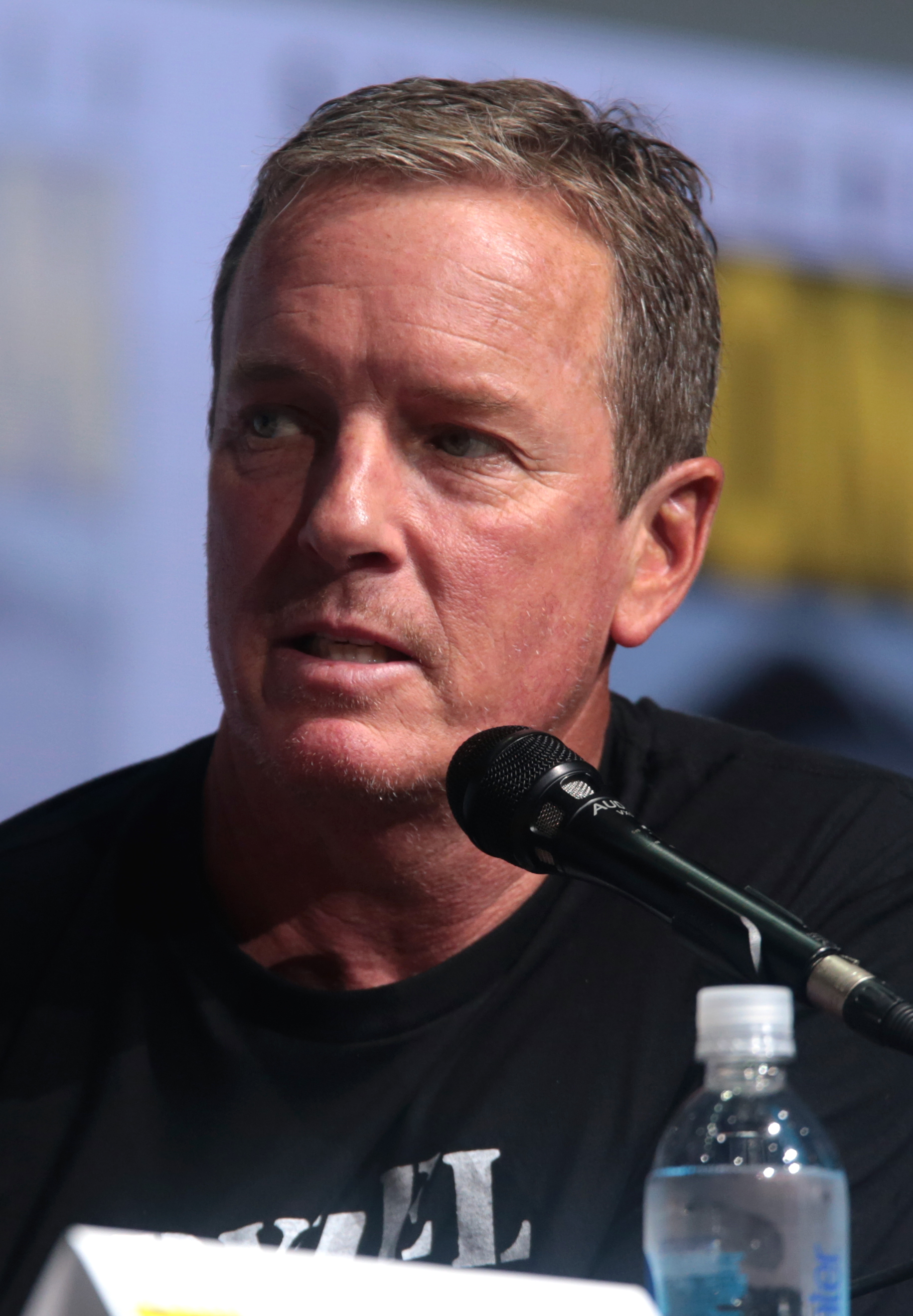
Linden Ashby
(Sheriff Stilinski)

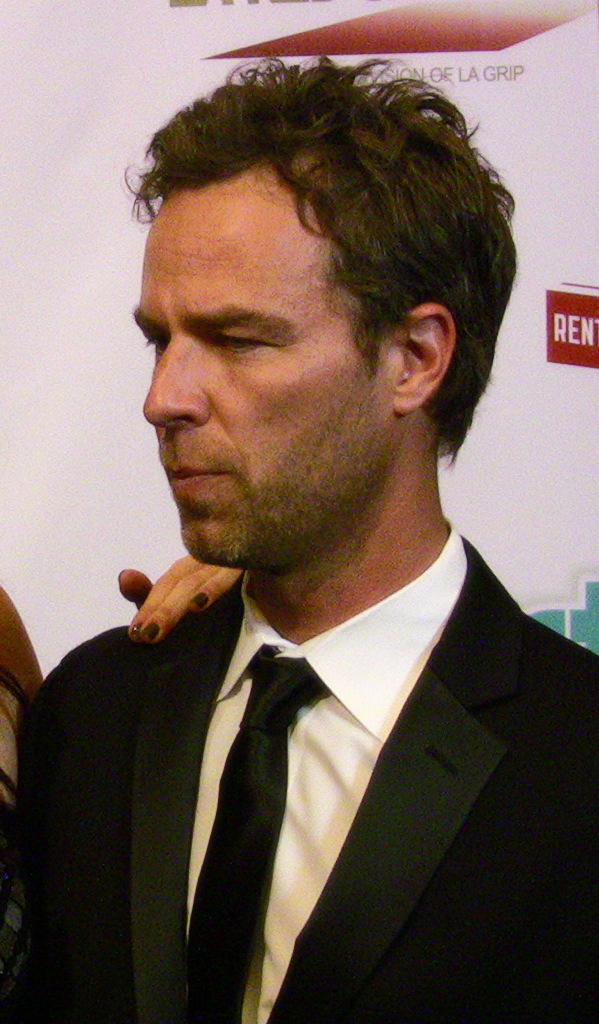
JR Bourne
(Chris Argent)

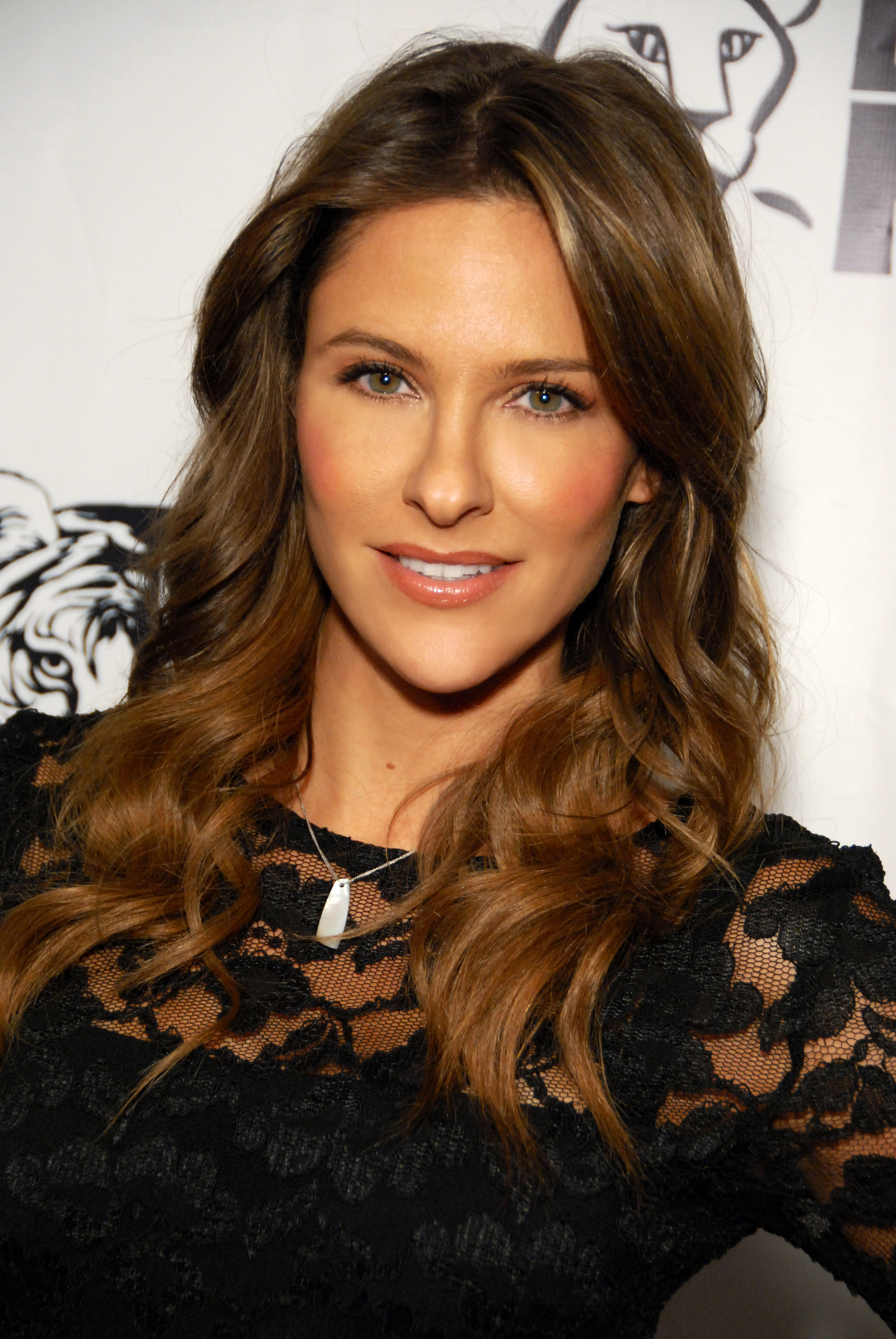
Jill Wagner
(Kate Argent)

=== Main ===
- Tyler Posey as Scott McCall
- Crystal Reed as Allison Argent
- Dylan O'Brien as Stiles Stilinski
- Tyler Hoechlin as Derek Hale
- Holland Roden as Lydia Martin
- Colton Haynes as Jackson Whittemore

=== Recurring ===
- Linden Ashby as Sheriff Stilinski
- JR Bourne as Chris Argent
- Jill Wagner as Kate Argent
- Melissa Ponzio as Melissa McCall
- Keahu Kahuanui as Danny Mahealani
- Orny Adams as Bobby Finstock
- Seth Gilliam as Dr. Deaton
- Ian Bohen as Peter Hale
- Eaddy Mays as Victoria Argent
- Adam Fristoe as Adrian R. Harris
- Haley Roe Murphy as Laura Hale
- Jamila Thompson as Harley
- Michael Dane as Leveque
- Susan Walters as Natalie Martin
- Desiree Hall as Jennifer (Peter's nurse)
- Jonathan Kleitman as Unger
- Hajji Golightly as Reddick

== Episodes ==
No. overall	No. in season	Title	Directed by	Written by	Original release date	US viewers (millions)
1	1	"Wolf Moon"	Russell Mulcahy	Story by : Jeff Davis and Jeph Loeb & Matthew Weisman; Teleplay by : Jeph Loeb & Matthew Weisman	June 5, 2011	2.17
An unusual occurrence while searching for a missing body in the woods with his best friend gives sophomore Scott McCall everything he'd ever wanted: new lacrosse abilities, a date with the girl of his dreams, and supernatural skills. But is there a downside to these new powers?
2	2	"Second Chance at First Line"	Russell Mulcahy	Jeff Davis	June 6, 2011	1.47
Scott tries to control his new werewolf powers, and faces mounting pressure from friends (including new love interest, Allison) and family alike to play in the coming lacrosse game. Can he stop his transformation before it's too late?
3	3	"Pack Mentality"	Russell Mulcahy	Jeff Vlaming	June 13, 2011	1.82
Scott is shaken when a nightmare coincides uncannily with the mauling of a school bus driver, an attack that puts Sheriff Stilinski and the rest of Beacon Hills on high alert. Meanwhile, Scott is excited for his first date with Allison, until it becomes a confusing group date with Lydia and Jackson to the bowling alley.
4	4	"Magic Bullet"	Toby Wilkins	Daniel Sinclair	June 20, 2011	1.80
Kate Argent, Allison's aunt, arrives in town and is attacked by the Alpha. While fighting it off, she shoots Derek. Now, Scott has to make it through an awkward family dinner with the Argents to get a bullet to save him, while Stiles and Derek attempt to slow the effects of the wound.
5	5	"The Tell"	Toby Wilkins	Monica Macer	June 27, 2011	1.68
Lydia and Jackson witness an animal attack at the video store. Kate gives Allison a family heirloom and encourages her to use it to learn more about the family history. Meanwhile, Derek must deal with the werewolf hunters on his own. Scott and Allison skip school, but are soon caught by their families at parent-teacher conferences.
6	6	"Heart Monitor"	Toby Wilkins	Daniel Sinclair	July 4, 2011	1.21
Scott attempts to control his anger and transformation so he can spend more time with Allison, assisted by Stiles and a heart monitor. Derek continues trying to make an ally of Scott in order to defeat the Alpha, and Jackson is feeling the effects of having been scratched.
7	7	"Night School"	Tim Andrew	Jeff Vlaming	July 11, 2011	1.66
Responding to Scott's howl, the alpha savages Derek and traps Scott and Stiles in their high school. Events escalate even further when Allison, Jackson and Lydia are lured to the school as well with a phony text message. At the end of the night, Allison breaks up with Scott after saying she cannot trust him.
8	8	"Lunatic"	Tim Andrew	Monica Macer	July 18, 2011	1.76
As Scott's second full moon approaches, he gives in to his animal urges and hurts Stiles, but Stiles gets a measure of revenge in locking him up. Meanwhile, Jackson continues to try to get closer to Allison. The Argents learn that Scott somehow knew Derek.
9	9	"Wolf's Bane"	Tim Andrew	Jonathon Roessler	July 25, 2011	1.93
Jackson discovers that he has aconite poisoning and thinks he has figured out what is up with Scott. Meanwhile, Derek hides from the manhunt in Stiles' room while Stiles and Scott try to get Allison's necklace and any clues that may lead to the identity of the alpha. Teammate Danny lends Stiles his internet expertise to help in the search. Derek and Stiles discover the identity of the Alpha.
10	10	"Co-Captain"	Russell Mulcahy	Jeff Vlaming	August 1, 2011	1.49
The Alpha finally reveals himself to Scott who happens to be Peter, Derek's uncle and gives him an idea of why he has killed certain people. Argent stages an encounter thinking that Jackson may be a werewolf. Meanwhile, Allison discovers a bit more about her family's secrets and confronts Lydia about her kissing Scott.
11	11	"Formality"	Russell Mulcahy	Monica Macer	August 8, 2011	1.74
Kate has Derek chained up in a basement following her attack on his house and shows him off to Allison before torturing him. The coach has banned Scott from the Spring Formal in exchange for not dropping him from the team for academic reasons. Scott intimidates Jackson into escorting Allison to the dance, and she asks Lydia to escort Stiles. Stiles convinces Peter Hale, who is the alpha werewolf, to spare Lydia's life after he bites her. Peter Hale agrees to Stiles' request, but in return Stiles must help him locate Derek. Scott sneaks into the dance, confessing his feelings to Allison. But soon thereafter, Allison discovers Scott's secret when her father, Chris Argent, and another hunter try to run Scott down with their car.
12	12	"Code Breaker"	Russell Mulcahy	Jeff Davis	August 15, 2011	2.08
Argent decides to send Allison and his sister Kate to Washington. Stiles helps Peter locate Derek. Meanwhile, Jackson is called to get Lydia to the hospital. Scott must cope with the girl he loves knowing his secret. Argent and the hunters try to get Scott's location out of Stiles and Jackson. Scott locates Derek and tells him Peter killed his sister on purpose. Kate tries to get Allison to kill Derek and Scott, but Argent stops them, having learned from Stiles that Kate was behind the Hale's house fire. Peter appears and kills Kate. Derek and Scott fight Peter, but they're overpowered. Stiles and Jackson appear with Lydia's self-igniting Molotov cocktails, which badly burn Peter before Derek slashes his throat, becoming the new Alpha. Scott and Allison reconcile. Jackson asks Derek for the bite.

== Awards and nominations ==
Year	Award	Category	Nominee(s)	Result
2011	Teen Choice Awards	Breakout Star	Tyler Posey	Nominated
2011	Teen Choice Awards	Choice Summer TV Show	Teen Wolf	Nominated
2011	Teen Choice Awards	Choice Summer TV Star – Female	Crystal Reed	Nominated
2011	Teen Choice Awards	Choice Summer TV Star – Male	Tyler Posey	Nominated
2011	Teen Choice Awards	Choice TV Actress – Fantasy/Sci-Fi	Crystal Reed	Nominated
2011	Teen Choice Awards	Choice TV Fantasy/Sci-Fi	Teen Wolf	Nominated

== Reception ==
The review aggregator website Rotten Tomatoes reported an approval rating of 68% and an average rating of 7.09/10 for the first season, based on 25 reviews. The website's critics consensus reads, "Thanks to a charismatic lead in Tyler Posey and some dark, biting humor, Teen Wolf is a pleasant summer surprise, even if it does tread familiar ground."

On Metacritic, which uses a weighted average, the season has a score of 61 out of 100, based on 47 critics, indicating "generally favorable" reviews.

== Home media ==
Season 1 was released on DVD in the United States on May 22, 2012, which is 12 days before the premiere of season 2 on June 3, 2012.
