= Teen Wolf season 2 =

Teen Wolf
- Season 2
- DVD cover
- Starring: Tyler Posey; Crystal Reed; Dylan O'Brien; Tyler Hoechlin; Holland Roden; Colton Haynes
- No. of episodes: 12

Release
- Original network: MTV
- Original release: June 3 – August 13, 2012

Season chronology
- ← Previous; Season 1 Next → Season 3

The second season of Teen Wolf, an American supernatural drama created by Jeff Davis based upon the 1985 film of the same name, premiered on June 3, 2012, and concluded on August 13, 2012, on the MTV network. The season featured 12 episodes.

== Plot ==
Scott McCall (Tyler Posey) and Allison Argent (Crystal Reed) conceal their renewed relationship from Allison's parents, who oppose it because they know Scott is a werewolf. Lydia Martin (Holland Roden) suffers chronic hallucinations since being bitten by Peter Hale (Ian Bohen), now dead because Derek Hale (Tyler Hoechlin) killed him to become the new Alpha werewolf. Derek recruits abused teen Isaac Lahey (Daniel Sharman) into his pack. Jackson Whittemore (Colton Haynes), bitten by Derek Hale at the end of Season 1, shows signs of rejecting Derek's bite, but the reason is a mystery. As Allison's grandfather Gerard Argent (Michael Hogan) comes to town for his daughter Kate Argent's (Jill Wagner) funeral, he decides to avenge her death by declaring war against all werewolves, innocent or not.

Isaac discovers his abusive father was killed by a strange creature. To keep close watch over Allison, Gerard replaces the Beacon Hills High principal and Allison's mother Victoria Argent (Eaddy Mays) becomes a substitute teacher. Lydia's hallucinations center on a mysterious young boy at the school. Derek recruits epileptic loner Erica Reyes (Gage Golightly) and a lonely Boyd (Sinqua Walls) to his pack. Derek discovers the unknown creature who killed Isaac's father is a Kanima, a lizard-like shape shifter created by a mutation in lycanthropy.

Jackson is revealed to be the Kanima, controlled by an unknown master who can make it kill or otherwise harm on orders. Lydia discovers that the Mysterious Young Boy (Michael Fjordbak) she hallucinated about does not exist and is actually a younger Peter Hale. Although dead, Peter is able to use her to lure Derek to him at the old Hale house in order to become resurrected. To save Scott from danger after Victoria Argent learns Scott and Allison are still together, Derek ends up biting Victoria, who commits suicide before she turns into a werewolf. Blaming Derek for his daughter's death, Gerard manipulates Allison's grief over her dead mother, making Allison become a ruthless hunter.

The Kanima's master is revealed to be Matt Daehler (Stephen Lunsford), one of Jackson's high school friends. Matt uses the Kanima/Jackson to seek vengeance against the people who left him, with no swimming ability, to nearly drown years ago at a swim team pool party held by Isaac's swim coach father. Because of the connection between the Kanima and his master, Jackson discovers he now fears water. Held hostage by Matt at a local police station, Scott, Stiles, their parents, and Derek are able to escape, although Scott transforms for the first time in front of his mother, Melissa McCall (Melissa Ponzio), leaving her horrified.

Gerard drowns Matt and becomes the Kanima/Jackson's new master. Derek learns from Peter that the Kanima's weakness is the love interest of its human form, in this case Lydia. Jackson is hospitalized whilst developing a new stage of the Kanima, whereby he ends up in the hands of his former friends. Boyd and Erica try to flee from Derek for their own safety, but are captured and tortured by hunters. Realizing his father, Gerard, corrupted his daughter Allison, Chris Argent (JR Bourne) helps Scott and his allies stop the Kanima from evolving. Gerard tries to confront the group by forcing Derek to bite him and cure his cancer, but Scott reveals he switched his medication with mountain ash. Gerard's body rejects the bite and he quickly disappears. Before the Kanima/Jackson can kill Allison, Lydia reaches out to him and saves him with her love. He evolves in to a new werewolf, as the Kanima is now dead.

Feeling guilty over her grandfather and his influence over her, Allison breaks up with Scott but she promises to come back. While Erica and Boyd are leaving Beacon Hills, they encounter a pack of menacing Alphas. Peter and Derek reveal to Isaac that Derek was building a pack to combat the impending Alpha Pack and Peter knows that they have arrived.

Also appearing during the season are Dr. Deaton (Seth Gilliam), Adrian Harris (Adam Fristoe), Coach Bobby Finstock (Orny Adams), Sheriff Stilinski (Linden Ashby), Danny Mahealani (Keahu Kahuanui), Marin Morrell (Bianca Lawson) and Mr. Lahey (John Wesley Shipp).

Kali, Ennis, Ethan and Aiden make a brief appearance in the season finale, "Master Plan", as the members of the Alpha Pack that kidnapped Boyd and Erica. As of Season 3, they become recurring characters, with their leader Deucalion introduced in "Tattoo", the first episode. These characters are played by Gideon Emery (Deucalion), Brian Patrick Wade (Ennis), Felisha Terrell (Kali), Charlie Carver (Ethan) and Max Carver (Aiden).

== Cast ==
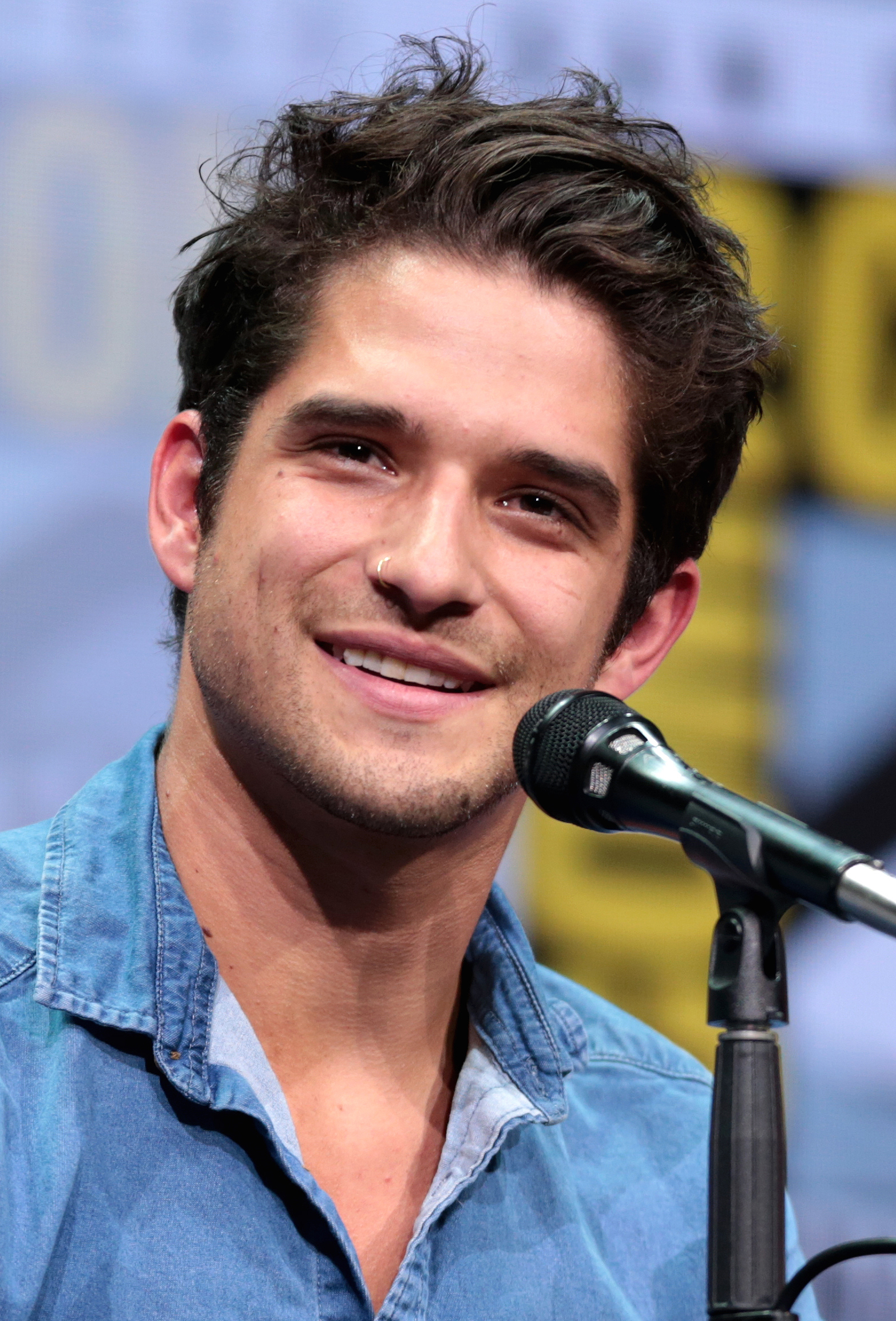
Tyler Posey
(Scott McCall)

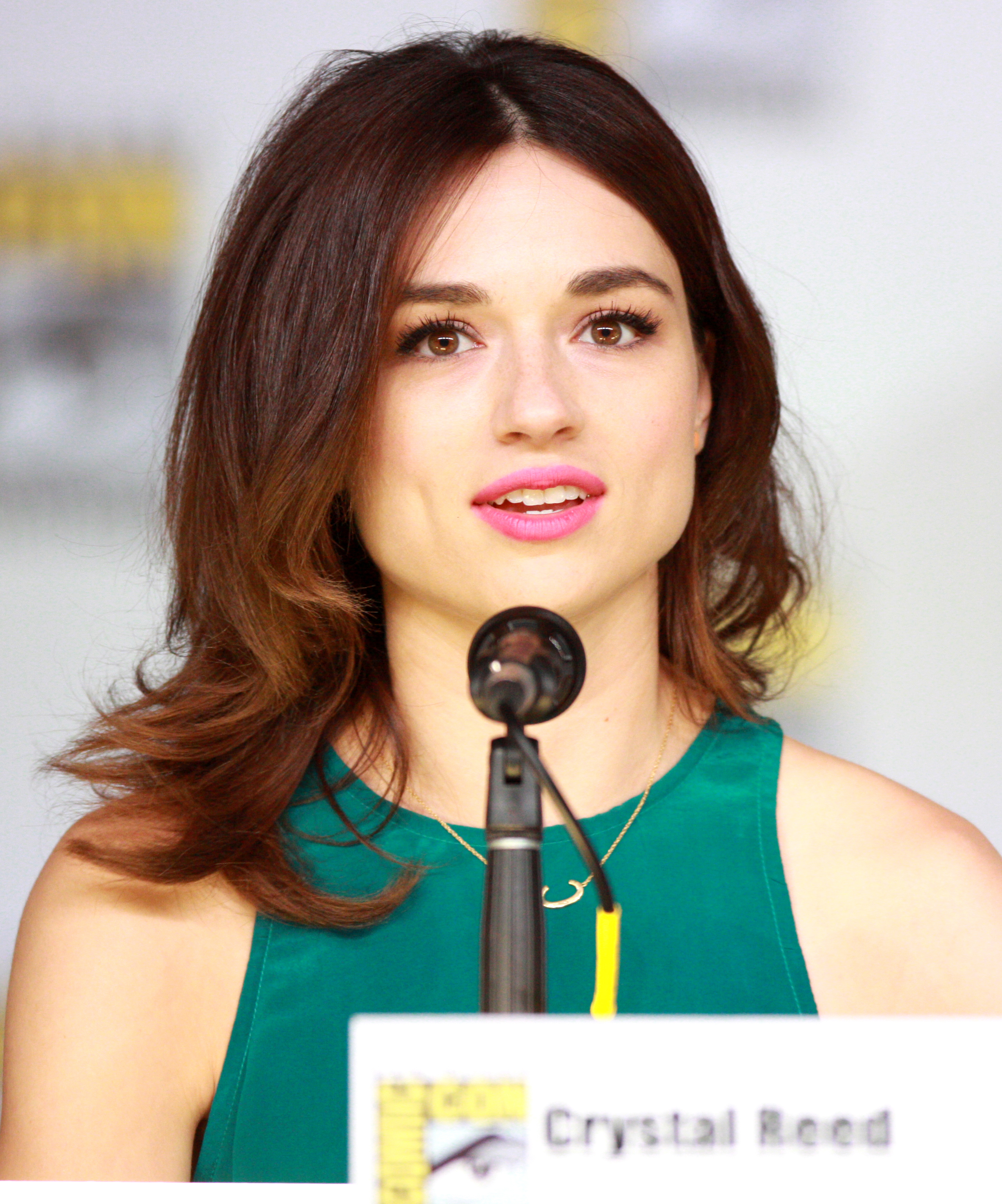
Crystal Reed
(Allison Argent)

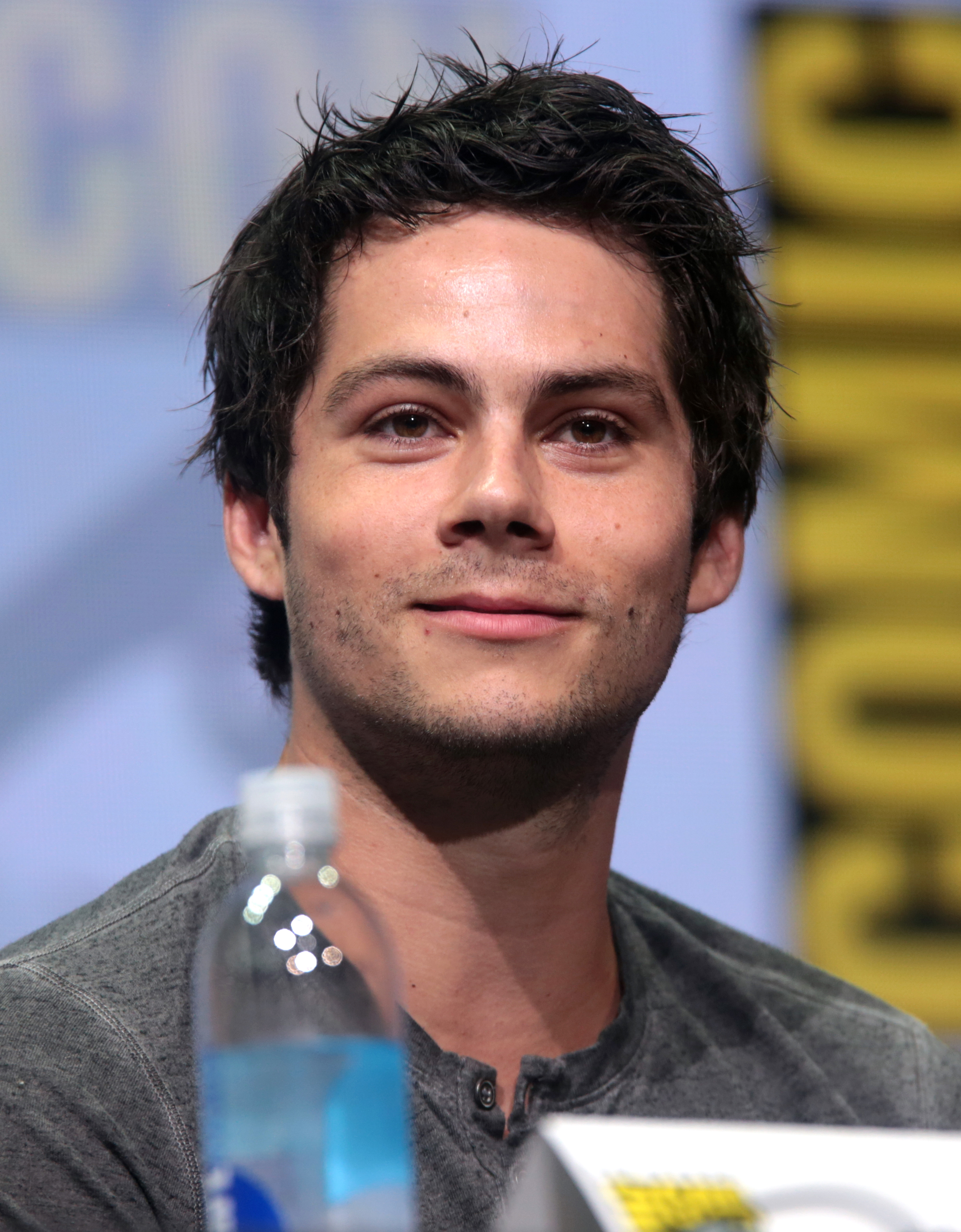
Dylan O'Brien
(Stiles Stilinski)

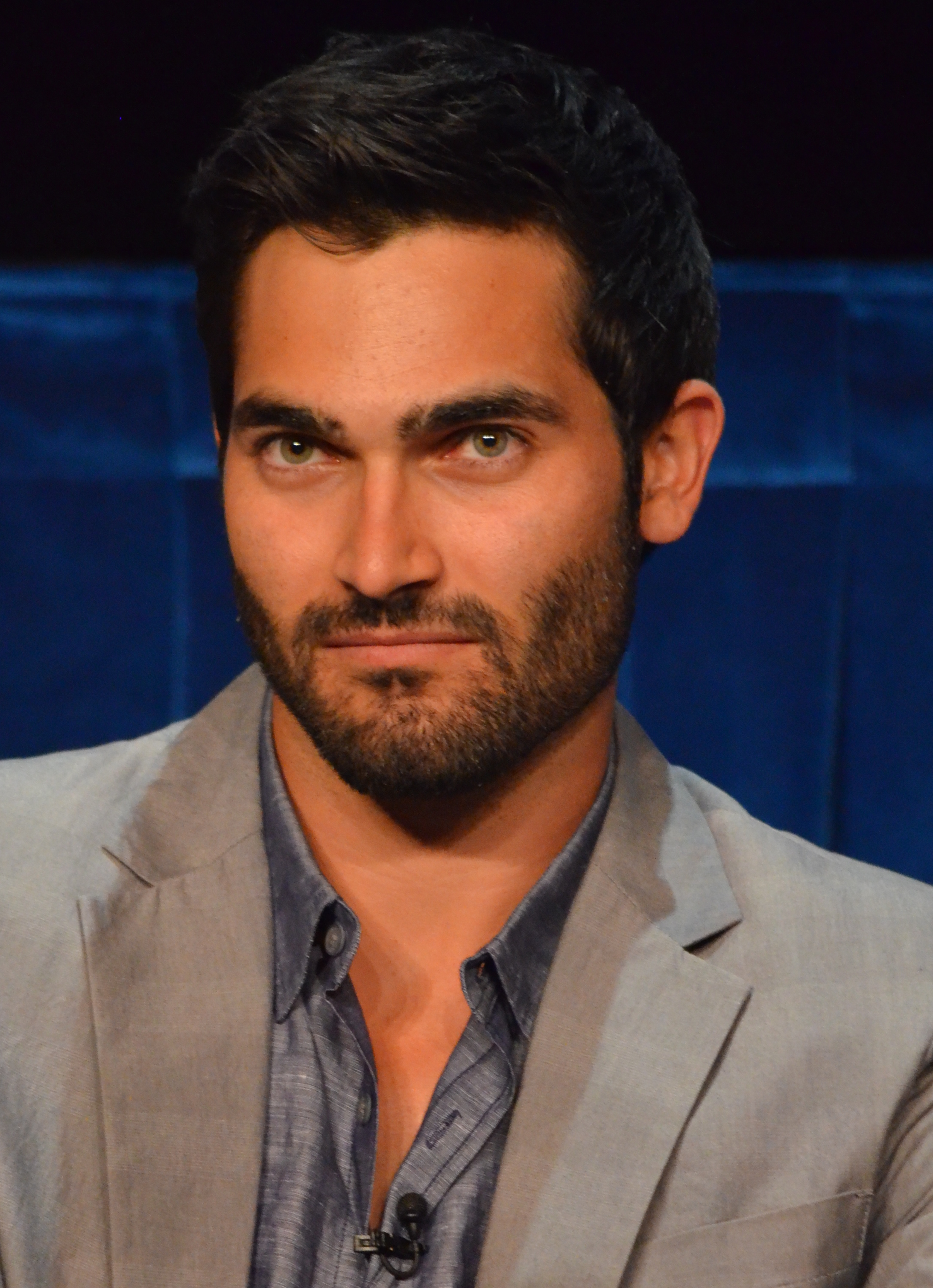
Tyler Hoechlin
(Derek Hale)

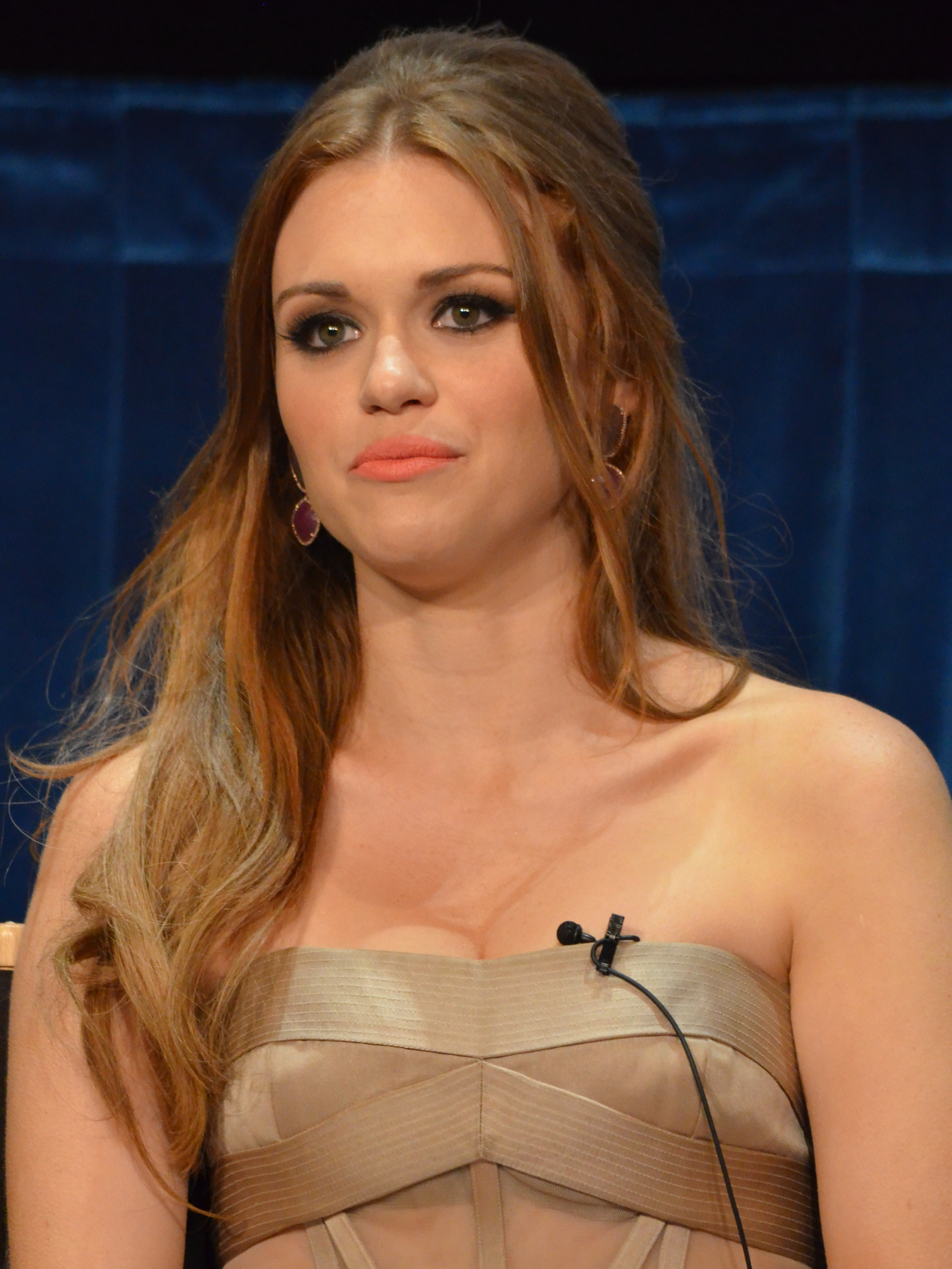
Holland Roden
(Lydia Martin)

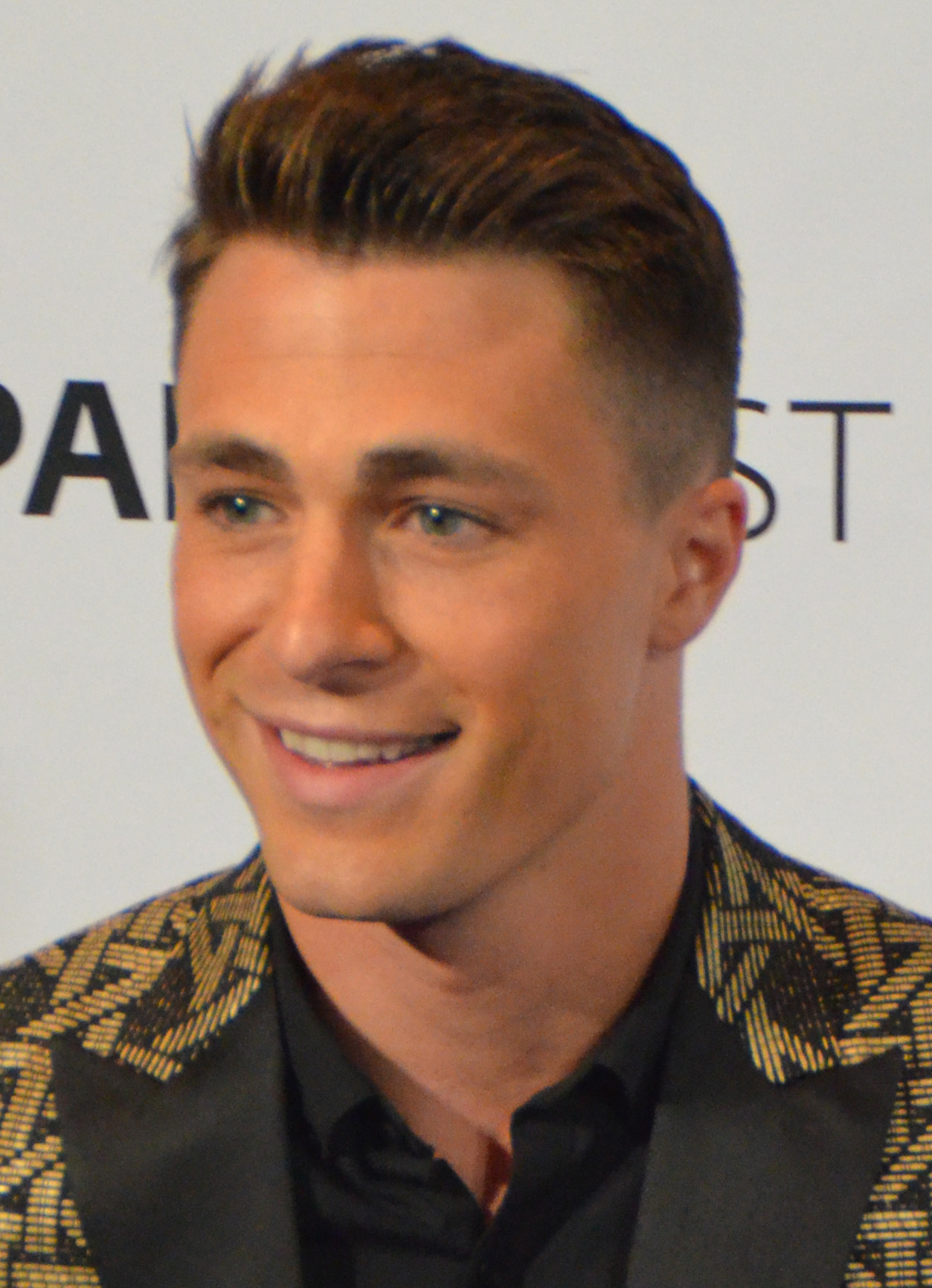
Colton Haynes
(Jackson Whittemore)

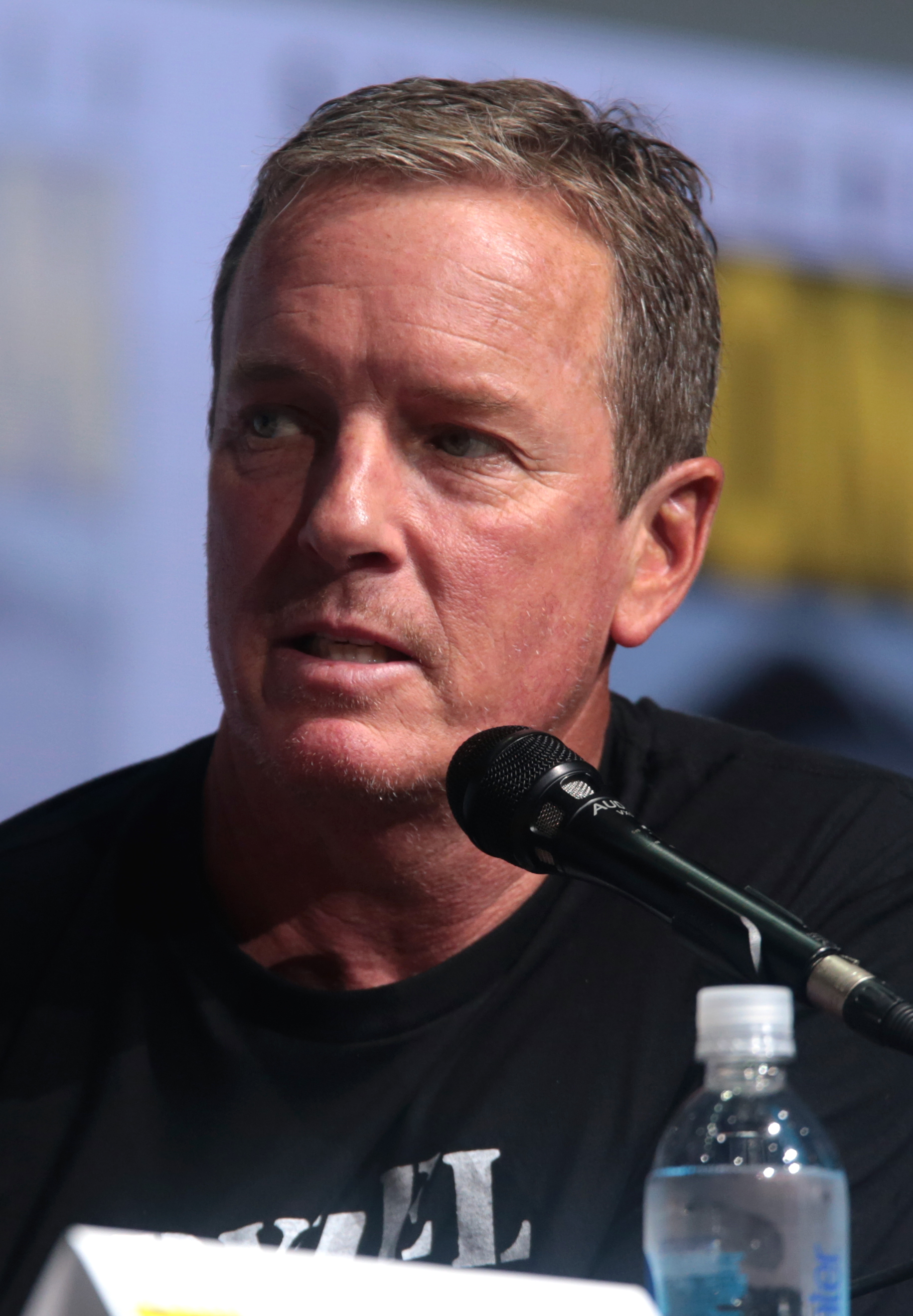
Linden Ashby
(Sheriff Stilinski)

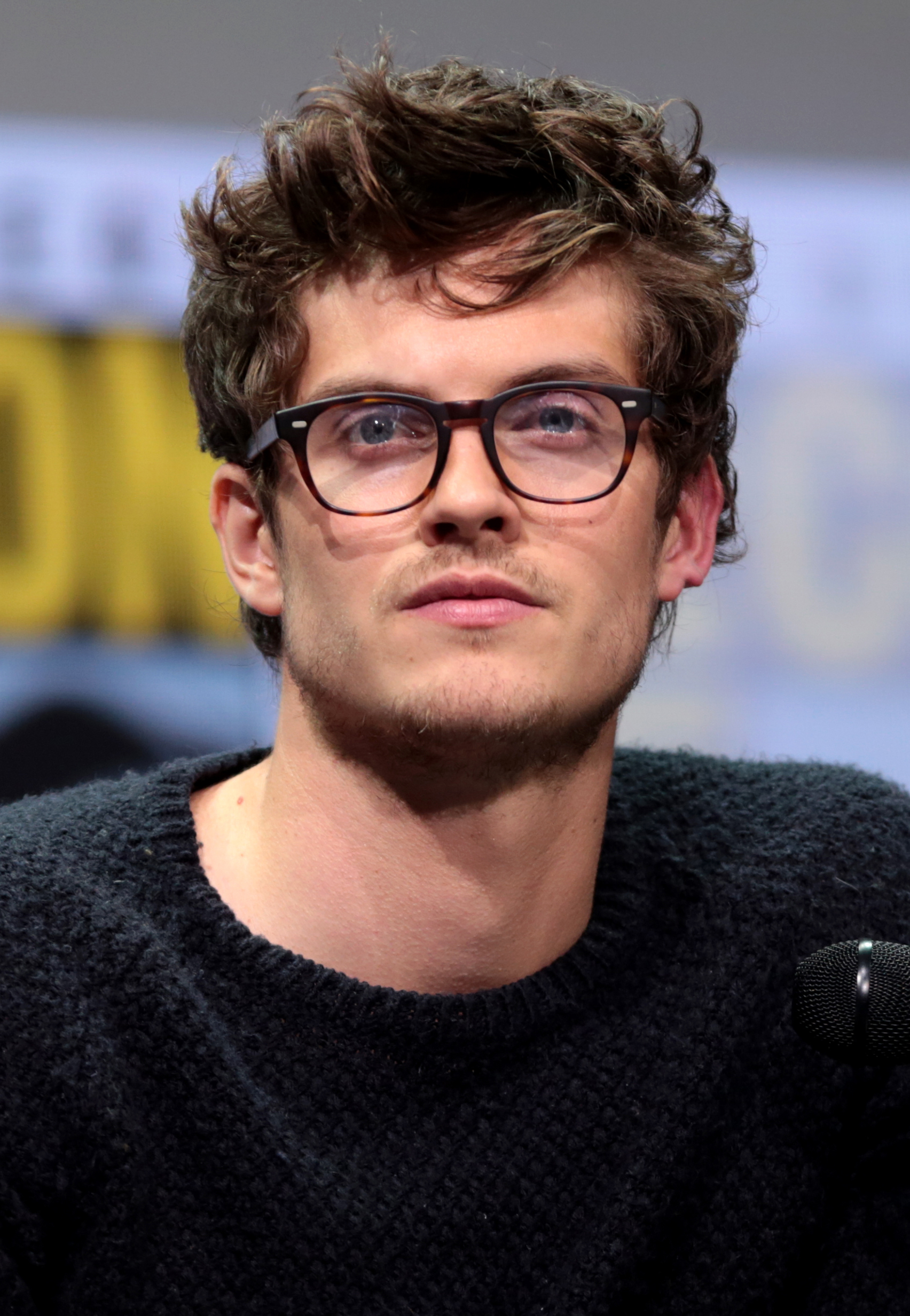
Daniel Sharman
(Isaac Lahey)

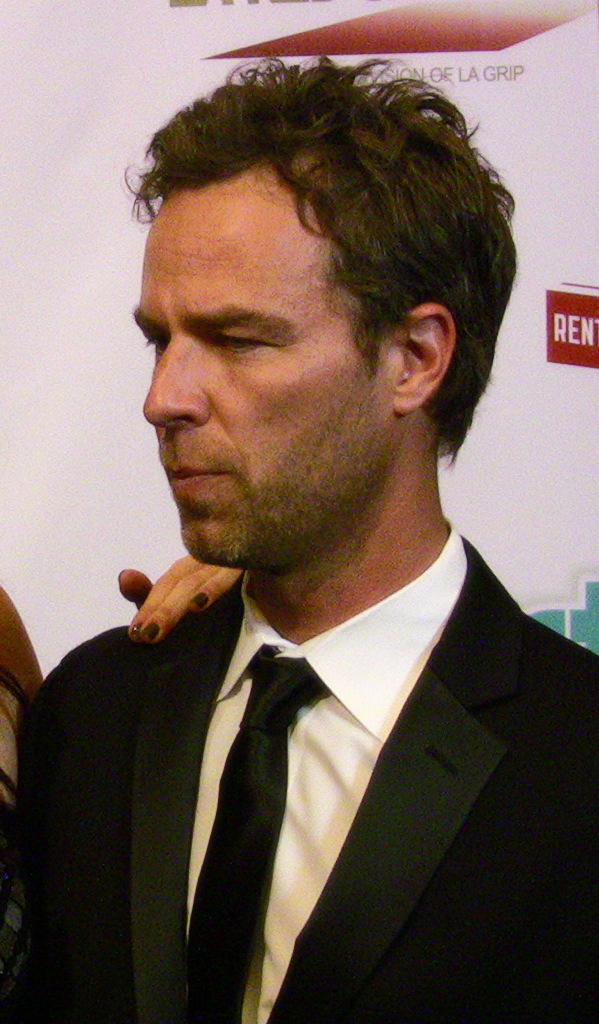
JR Bourne
(Chris Argent)

=== Main ===
- Tyler Posey as Scott McCall
- Crystal Reed as Allison Argent
- Dylan O'Brien as Stiles Stilinski
- Tyler Hoechlin as Derek Hale
- Holland Roden as Lydia Martin
- Colton Haynes as Jackson Whittemore

=== Recurring ===
- Linden Ashby as Sheriff Stilinski
- Daniel Sharman as Isaac Lahey
- JR Bourne as Chris Argent
- Michael Hogan as Gerard Argent
- Stephen Lunsford as Matt Daehler
- Melissa Ponzio as Melissa McCall
- Gage Golightly as Erica Reyes
- Orny Adams as Bobby Finstock
- Keahu Kahuanui as Danny Mahealani
- Sinqua Walls as Vernon Boyd
- Eaddy Mays as Victoria Argent
- Ian Bohen as Peter Hale
- Seth Gilliam as Dr. Alan Deaton
- Bianca Lawson as Marin Morrell
- Adam Fristoe as Adrian R. Harris
- Robert Pralgo as Mr. Whittemore
- Michael Fjordbak as young Peter Hale
- John Wesley Shipp as Mr. Lahey

== Episodes ==
No. overall	No. in season	Title	Directed by	Written by	Original release date	US viewers (millions)
13	1	"Omega"	Russell Mulcahy	Jeff Davis	June 3, 2012	2.11
Lydia vanishes from the hospital after a disturbing hallucination, and is found naked in the woods two days later. Isaac, a tormented teen abused by his father, is attacked while working in his father's cemetery; Derek appears to save him. Jackson begins bleeding black blood and is told by Derek that his body is resisting the bite. Derek forces Scott to watch Gerard kill an innocent werewolf and declare that they will eliminate all werewolves to avenge his daughter Kate's death.
14	2	"Shape Shifted"	Russell Mulcahy	Andrew Cochran	June 4, 2012	1.75
Isaac's father is murdered by a strange creature. Scott discovers Isaac is now a werewolf. Isaac is then taken into custody for his father's murder. When it is revealed that the werewolf hunters are going to kill Isaac, Scott, Stiles and Derek plan to save him, as he is innocent. At the jail, Isaac transforms and breaks out, advancing on Stiles. Derek, being the Alpha werewolf, is able to force him into submission. Jackson, who had set up a video camera overnight to record his transformation, is upset to learn that nothing happened.
15	3	"Ice Pick"	Tim Andrew	Luke Passmore	June 11, 2012	1.76
Chris begins Allison's training to become a werewolf hunter. At school, Erica, an epileptic girl, has a seizure and ends up in the hospital. There, Derek delivers the bite upon the promise that her illness will vanish. Dr. Deaton finds a dead hunter in his office and Chris wants him to find out what happened. Scott discovers Boyd is now a werewolf and is forced into a fight with Derek, Erica, and Isaac. Jackson is shocked when he exhibits inhuman strength.
16	4	"Abomination"	Tim Andrew	Christian Taylor	June 18, 2012	1.69
When Stiles takes his jeep in for repair, he is paralyzed by the creature's toxin and witnesses it kill the mechanic. Jackson discovers there are actually over 2 hours of missing footage from the night he recorded himself. The creature attacks Derek and paralyzes him. Derek falls into the pool and Stiles jumps in to save him. They discover the creature cannot swim, so they stay in the water until Scott saves them. Derek realizes that the creature is a Kanima. Gerard reveals he knows Scott's secret and blackmails him.
17	5	"Venomous"	Tim Andrew	Nick Antosca & Ned Vizzini	June 25, 2012	1.65
Convinced that Lydia is the Kanima, since she displayed immunity to the creature's toxin, Derek wants to kill her. Scott, Allison, Stiles and Jackson try to protect her together. After a fight with Derek's pack, it is revealed to everyone that Jackson is the Kanima.
18	6	"Frenemy"	Russell Mulcahy	Jeff Davis	July 2, 2012	1.65
Derek engages the Kanima in a fight interrupted by Chris and Gerard. The Kanima does not attack Gerard, instead seeming to communicate with him, which confuses Chris. After the Kanima paralyzes Danny and 6 others at a gay club, Jackson passes out, so Stiles locks him up in a police van. However, Jackson transforms and escapes. Allison discovers the Kanima seeks a master, revealing that Jackson is being controlled by someone.
19	7	"Restraint"	Russell Mulcahy	Nick Antosca & Ned Vizzini	July 9, 2012	1.72
A fight between Scott and Jackson lands everyone involved in detention. Jackson transforms, injures Matt and Erica, and leaves a warning from his master. Erica has a seizure as a result of the Kanima's venom and Scott and Stiles rush her to Derek. Lydia meets the strange boy she has been seeing around, only for him to reveal himself to be a younger version of Peter Hale. Lydia realizes that the young boy was a part of her imagination and that Peter has been communicating with her via hallucination all along
20	8	"Raving"	Russell Mulcahy	Jeff Davis	July 16, 2012	1.33
Jackson is commanded by his master to attend a secret rave, where his next target is. Stiles and Sheriff Stilinski realize there is a pattern in the murders: all victims had been in the class of 2006. Stiles's father loses his job because Stiles's irresponsible behavior reflects badly on the county. Scott is attacked by Victoria, who attempts to kill him. Isaac drugs Jackson, and he and Erica join Stiles in interrogating his master, who speaks through him. Jackson transforms, successfully killing his target. Derek saves Scott, biting Victoria in the process.
21	9	"Party Guessed"	Tim Andrew	Jeff Davis	July 23, 2012	1.65
Stiles realizes that all the murder victims were on the Beacon Hills High swim team and the coach at the time was Isaac's father. At Lydia's birthday party, she spikes the punchbowl with wolfsbane petals, causing all the party attendees to hallucinate the things they fear most. She attacks Derek and brings him to the Hale house, where Peter uses Derek's blood to come back to life. Victoria kills herself so that she would not become a werewolf. It is revealed that Matt is the Kanima's master.
22	10	"Fury"	Tim Andrew	Jeff Davis	July 30, 2012	1.60
Matt takes Scott, Stiles, Melissa and Sheriff Stilinski hostage. Gerard persuades Allison to exact revenge on Derek for bringing her mother to suicide. Matt reveals to Scott his reason for the murders: in 2006, all the victims were at a party at Isaac's house where Matt came to meet Isaac. They had thrown Matt in the pool and left him to drown, despite him yelling he cannot swim. Melissa finally sees Scott as a werewolf. Gerard drowns Matt in the lake and becomes the Kanima's new master.
23	11	"Battlefield"	Tim Andrew	Jeff Davis	August 6, 2012	1.72
Boyd and Erica leave Derek, terrified of the Argent werewolf genocide. At the championship lacrosse game, Gerard threatens to murder someone with the Kanima if Scott does not bring Derek to him by the game's end. Allison ruthlessly shoots Boyd with arrows until the werewolves are saved by Chris, who is upset by Allison's actions. On the field, Stiles begins a massive winning streak, much to the satisfaction of his father, Scott's mother, Lydia and the coach, and their team wins. Just then, Jackson is found bleeding and unresponsive; he has stabbed himself with his own claws. Sheriff Stilinski makes a grim discovery: Stiles has gone missing.
24	12	"Master Plan"	Tim Andrew; Russell Mulcahy	Jeff Davis	August 13, 2012	1.71
Stiles is kidnapped by Gerard, who also has Boyd and Erica hostage; Stiles escapes. Chris, realizing that Gerard is the true enemy, sets Boyd and Erica free, and helps Scott and Isaac take Jackson's body to Derek. Jackson turns into the Kanima, and a battle ensues. Gerard reveals he has cancer and had planned to cure himself by becoming an Alpha werewolf. However, when Gerard's body rejects the bite, Scott reveals he had replaced Gerard's cancer pills with mountain ash. Jackson is killed by Peter and Derek but comes back to life as a blue-eyed werewolf. Allison tearfully breaks up with Scott, but he assures her he'll wait. Peter reveals a pack of Alpha werewolves have come to town, indicating new danger. This Alpha pack captures Boyd and Erica as they flee.

== Production ==
Shooting of season two began in early December 2011 and finished in late April 2012. The second season premiered after the 2012 MTV Movie Awards on June 3, 2012, and will follow the same airing schedule as the first season.

Michael Hogan has been cast as Allison's grandfather, Gerard, a lethal werewolf hunter who attempts to convince her to join the family business and aims to avenge his daughter's murder by killing all werewolves. Stephen Lunsford has been cast as Matt, a teenager with an eye for photography who has taken a stalkerish liking towards Allison. Daniel Sharman has been cast as Isaac Lahey, a troubled teen and member of the lacrosse team who is the first to join Derek's pack. Gage Golightly has been cast as Erica Reyes, the first female werewolf in Derek's pack. Sinqua Walls has been cast as Boyd, the third and final member of Derek's pack.

== Reception ==
The review aggregator website Rotten Tomatoes reported an approval rating of 90% and an average rating of 7.84/10 for the second season, based on 10 reviews. The website's critics consensus reads, "This lupine romp gains swagger in its sophomore outing, nailing an addictive mix of soapy melodrama and horror thrills."

== Awards and nominations ==
Year	Award	Category	Nominee(s)	Result
2012	ALMA Award	Favorite TV Actor – Leading Role	Tyler Posey	Won
2012	Imagen Award	Best Actor/Television	Tyler Posey	Nominated
2012	Saturn Awards	Best Youth-Oriented Series on Television	Teen Wolf	Won
2012	Teen Choice Awards	Choice Summer TV Show	Teen Wolf	Won
2012	Teen Choice Awards	Choice Summer TV Star – Female	Crystal Reed	Nominated
2012	Teen Choice Awards	Choice Summer TV Star – Male	Tyler Posey	Won

== Home media ==
The second season was released on DVD in the United States on May 21, 2013.
