= List of Teen Wolf episodes =

Teen Wolf is an American supernatural drama developed by Jeff Davis loosely based upon the 1985 film of the same name and a screenplay by Jeph Loeb & Matthew Weisman, which premiered on June 5, 2011 on MTV. The series stars Tyler Posey as Scott McCall, a teenager who transforms into a werewolf after being bitten by one.

A six-episode web series, "Search for a Cure", was produced and presented by AT&T and released alongside the first season in 2011. Accompanying the episodes of Season 3 Part 2, Season 4, and several episodes of Season 5 Part 1, the aftershow Wolf Watch aired after each episode on MTV, originally hosted by Jill Wagner, who was succeeded by Tyler Posey.

On July 21, 2016, the cast announced at Comic Con that the series would end after its sixth season. The series finale aired on September 24, 2017. During the course of the series, 100 episodes of Teen Wolf aired over six seasons.

A film continuation, Teen Wolf: The Movie, was released on Paramount+ on January 26, 2023.

== Series overview ==
Season	Episodes		Originally released		Avg. viewers (millions)
Season	Episodes		First released	Last released	Avg. viewers (millions)
1	12		June 5, 2011	August 15, 2011	1.73
2	12		June 3, 2012	August 13, 2012	1.69
3	24	12	June 3, 2013	August 19, 2013	1.97
3	24	12	January 6, 2014	March 24, 2014	1.97
4	12		June 23, 2014	September 8, 2014	1.61
5	20	10	June 29, 2015	August 24, 2015	1.05
5	20	10	January 5, 2016	March 8, 2016	1.05
6	20	10	November 15, 2016	January 31, 2017	0.47
6	20	10	July 30, 2017	September 24, 2017	0.47

== Episodes ==
=== Season 1 (2011) ===
No. overall	No. in season	Title	Directed by	Written by	Original release date	US viewers (millions)
1	1	"Wolf Moon"	Russell Mulcahy	Story by : Jeff Davis and Jeph Loeb & Matthew Weisman; Teleplay by : Jeph Loeb & Matthew Weisman	June 5, 2011	2.17
2	2	"Second Chance at First Line"	Russell Mulcahy	Jeff Davis	June 6, 2011	1.47
3	3	"Pack Mentality"	Russell Mulcahy	Jeff Vlaming	June 13, 2011	1.82
4	4	"Magic Bullet"	Toby Wilkins	Daniel Sinclair	June 20, 2011	1.80
5	5	"The Tell"	Toby Wilkins	Monica Macer	June 27, 2011	1.68
6	6	"Heart Monitor"	Toby Wilkins	Daniel Sinclair	July 4, 2011	1.21
7	7	"Night School"	Tim Andrew	Jeff Vlaming	July 11, 2011	1.66
8	8	"Lunatic"	Tim Andrew	Monica Macer	July 18, 2011	1.76
9	9	"Wolf's Bane"	Tim Andrew	Jonathon Roessler	July 25, 2011	1.93
10	10	"Co-Captain"	Russell Mulcahy	Jeff Vlaming	August 1, 2011	1.49
11	11	"Formality"	Russell Mulcahy	Monica Macer	August 8, 2011	1.74
12	12	"Code Breaker"	Russell Mulcahy	Jeff Davis	August 15, 2011	2.08

=== Season 2 (2012) ===
No. overall	No. in season	Title	Directed by	Written by	Original release date	US viewers (millions)
13	1	"Omega"	Russell Mulcahy	Jeff Davis	June 3, 2012	2.11
14	2	"Shape Shifted"	Russell Mulcahy	Andrew Cochran	June 4, 2012	1.75
15	3	"Ice Pick"	Tim Andrew	Luke Passmore	June 11, 2012	1.76
16	4	"Abomination"	Tim Andrew	Christian Taylor	June 18, 2012	1.69
17	5	"Venomous"	Tim Andrew	Nick Antosca & Ned Vizzini	June 25, 2012	1.65
18	6	"Frenemy"	Russell Mulcahy	Jeff Davis	July 2, 2012	1.65
19	7	"Restraint"	Russell Mulcahy	Nick Antosca & Ned Vizzini	July 9, 2012	1.72
20	8	"Raving"	Russell Mulcahy	Jeff Davis	July 16, 2012	1.33
21	9	"Party Guessed"	Tim Andrew	Jeff Davis	July 23, 2012	1.65
22	10	"Fury"	Tim Andrew	Jeff Davis	July 30, 2012	1.60
23	11	"Battlefield"	Tim Andrew	Jeff Davis	August 6, 2012	1.72
24	12	"Master Plan"	Tim Andrew; Russell Mulcahy	Jeff Davis	August 13, 2012	1.71

=== Season 3 (2013–14) ===
No. overall	No. in season	Title	Directed by	Written by	Original release date	US viewers (millions)
Part 1
25	1	"Tattoo"	Russell Mulcahy	Jeff Davis	June 3, 2013	2.36
26	2	"Chaos Rising"	Russell Mulcahy	Jeff Davis	June 10, 2013	2.11
27	3	"Fireflies"	Tim Andrew	Lucas Sussman	June 17, 2013	1.67
28	4	"Unleashed"	Tim Andrew	Alyssa Clark & Jesec Griffin	June 24, 2013	1.91
29	5	"Frayed"	Robert Hall	Angela L. Harvey	July 1, 2013	1.63
30	6	"Motel California"	Christian Taylor	Christian Taylor	July 8, 2013	1.86
31	7	"Currents"	Russell Mulcahy	Jeff Davis	July 15, 2013	1.82
32	8	"Visionary"	Russell Mulcahy	Jeff Davis	July 22, 2013	1.78
33	9	"The Girl Who Knew Too Much"	Tim Andrew	Jeff Davis	July 29, 2013	1.77
34	10	"The Overlooked"	Russell Mulcahy	Jeff Davis	August 5, 2013	1.97
35	11	"Alpha Pact"	Tim Andrew	Jeff Davis	August 12, 2013	1.91
36	12	"Lunar Ellipse"	Russell Mulcahy	Jeff Davis	August 19, 2013	2.08
Part 2
37	13	"Anchors"	Russell Mulcahy	Jeff Davis	January 6, 2014	2.43
38	14	"More Bad Than Good"	Tim Andrew	Jeff Davis	January 13, 2014	1.91
39	15	"Galvanize"	Robert Hall	Eoghan O'Donnell	January 20, 2014	2.00
40	16	"Illuminated"	Russell Mulcahy	Alyssa Clark	January 27, 2014	1.87
41	17	"Silverfinger"	Jennifer Lynch	Moira McMahon Leeper	February 3, 2014	2.26
42	18	"Riddled"	Tim Andrew	Christian Taylor	February 10, 2014	2.09
43	19	"Letharia Vulpina"	Russell Mulcahy	Jeff Davis	February 17, 2014	2.12
44	20	"Echo House"	Tim Andrew	Jeff Davis	February 24, 2014	1.94
45	21	"The Fox and the Wolf"	Tim Andrew	Ian Stokes	March 3, 2014	2.06
46	22	"De-Void"	Christian Taylor	Jeff Davis	March 10, 2014	1.80
47	23	"Insatiable"	Tim Andrew	Jeff Davis	March 17, 2014	2.00
48	24	"The Divine Move"	Russell Mulcahy	Jeff Davis	March 24, 2014	2.26

=== Season 4 (2014) ===
No. overall	No. in season	Title	Directed by	Written by	Original release date	US viewers (millions)
49	1	"The Dark Moon"	Russell Mulcahy	Jeff Davis	June 23, 2014	2.18
50	2	"117"	Christian Taylor	Eoghan O'Donnell	June 30, 2014	1.55
51	3	"Muted"	Tim Andrew	Alyssa Clark	July 7, 2014	1.55
52	4	"The Benefactor"	Russell Mulcahy	Jeff Davis & Ian Stokes	July 14, 2014	1.72
53	5	"I.E.D."	Jennifer Lynch	Angela L. Harvey	July 21, 2014	1.61
54	6	"Orphaned"	Russell Mulcahy	Jeff Davis	July 28, 2014	1.56
55	7	"Weaponized"	Tim Andrew	Alyssa Clark	August 4, 2014	1.75
56	8	"Time of Death"	Jann Turner	Angela L. Harvey	August 11, 2014	1.68
57	9	"Perishable"	Jennifer Lynch	Eric Wallace	August 18, 2014	1.48
58	10	"Monstrous"	J. D. Taylor	Jeff Davis & Ian Stokes	August 24, 2014	1.44
59	11	"A Promise to the Dead"	Tim Andrew	Jeff Davis & Ian Stokes	September 1, 2014	1.29
60	12	"Smoke and Mirrors"	Russell Mulcahy	Jeff Davis	September 8, 2014	1.54

=== Season 5 (2015–16) ===
No. overall	No. in season	Title	Directed by	Written by	Original release date	US viewers (millions)
Part 1
61	1	"Creatures of the Night"	Russell Mulcahy	Jeff Davis	June 29, 2015	1.53
62	2	"Parasomnia"	Tim Andrew	Jeff Davis	June 30, 2015	1.18
63	3	"Dreamcatchers"	Russell Mulcahy	Talia Gonzalez & Bisanne Masoud	July 6, 2015	1.38
64	4	"Condition Terminal"	Bronwen Hughes	Jeff Davis & Ian Stokes	July 13, 2015	1.01
65	5	"A Novel Approach"	Tim Andrew	Angela L. Harvey	July 20, 2015	1.26
66	6	"Required Reading"	Alice Troughton	Jeff Davis & Ian Stokes	July 27, 2015	1.14
67	7	"Strange Frequencies"	Russell Mulcahy	Angela L. Harvey	August 3, 2015	1.09
68	8	"Ouroboros"	David Daniel	Will Wallace	August 10, 2015	1.10
69	9	"Lies of Omission"	Tim Andrew	Eric Wallace	August 17, 2015	1.10
70	10	"Status Asthmaticus"	Russell Mulcahy	Jeff Davis & Ian Stokes	August 24, 2015	0.96
Part 2
71	11	"The Last Chimera"	Russell Mulcahy	Jeff Davis	January 5, 2016	1.11
72	12	"Damnatio Memoriae"	Tim Andrew	Brian Sieve	January 12, 2016	0.93
73	13	"Codominance"	Jennifer Lynch	Will Wallace	January 19, 2016	0.91
74	14	"The Sword and the Spirit"	Kate Eastridge	Angela L. Harvey	January 26, 2016	0.92
75	15	"Amplification"	Russell Mulcahy	Lindsay Jewett Sturman	February 2, 2016	0.98
76	16	"Lie Ability"	Russell Mulcahy	Eric Wallace	February 9, 2016	0.88
77	17	"A Credible Threat"	Tim Andrew	Jeff Davis	February 16, 2016	0.97
78	18	"Maid of Gévaudan"	Joseph P. Genier	Jeff Davis	February 23, 2016	0.76
79	19	"The Beast of Beacon Hills"	Tim Andrew	Eric Wallace	March 1, 2016	0.91
80	20	"Apotheosis"	Russell Mulcahy	Jeff Davis	March 8, 2016	0.80

=== Season 6 (2016–17) ===
No. overall	No. in season	Title	Directed by	Written by	Original release date	US viewers (millions)
Part 1
81	1	"Memory Lost"	Tim Andrew	Lindsay Jewett Sturman	November 15, 2016	0.57
82	2	"Superposition"	JD Taylor	Mark H. Kruger	November 22, 2016	0.41
83	3	"Sundowning"	David Daniel	Will Wallace	November 29, 2016	0.43
84	4	"Relics"	Tim Andrew	Eric Wallace	December 6, 2016	0.51
85	5	"Radio Silence"	Russell Mulcahy	Ross Maxwell	December 13, 2016	0.55
86	6	"Ghosted"	Russell Mulcahy	Angela L. Harvey	January 3, 2017	0.45
87	7	"Heartless"	Kate Eastridge	Antoinette Stella	January 10, 2017	0.43
88	8	"Blitzkrieg"	Joseph P. Genier	Will Wallace	January 17, 2017	0.44
89	9	"Memory Found"	Tim Andrew	Mark H. Kruger & Antoinette Stella	January 24, 2017	0.49
90	10	"Riders on the Storm"	Russell Mulcahy	Lindsay Jewett Sturman & Joseph P. Genier	January 31, 2017	0.45
Part 2
91	11	"Said the Spider to the Fly"	Russell Mulcahy	Adam Karp	July 30, 2017	0.52
92	12	"Raw Talent"	Tim Andrew	Brian Millikin	August 6, 2017	0.47
93	13	"After Images"	Tyler Posey	Angela L. Harvey	August 13, 2017	0.43
94	14	"Face-to-Faceless"	Linden Ashby	Will Wallace	August 20, 2017	0.44
95	15	"Pressure Test"	Tim Andrew	Jennifer Quintenz	August 20, 2017	0.37
96	16	"Triggers"	Eric Wallace	Eric Wallace	September 3, 2017	0.44
97	17	"Werewolves of London"	Russell Mulcahy	Kyle Steinbach	September 10, 2017	0.42
98	18	"Genotype"	Joseph P. Genier	Joseph P. Genier	September 17, 2017	0.43
99	19	"Broken Glass"	Tim Andrew	Lindsay Jewett Sturman	September 17, 2017	0.39
100	20	"The Wolves of War"	Russell Mulcahy	Jeff Davis	September 24, 2017	0.68

== Specials ==
=== Search for a Cure ===
No.	Title	Directed by	Written by	Original release date
1	"Episode 1"	Jeff Davis	Jeff Davis	June 29, 2011
2	"Episode 2"	Jeff Davis	Jeff Davis	June 29, 2011
3	"Episode 3"	Jeff Davis	Jeff Davis	July 4, 2011
4	"Episode 4"	Jeff Davis	Jeff Davis	July 11, 2011
5	"Episode 5"	Jeff Davis	Jeff Davis	July 18, 2011
6	"Episode 6"	Jeff Davis	Jeff Davis	July 25, 2011

=== Revelations ===
No.	Title	Season discussed	Original release date
1	"Origins"	First season	May 21, 2012
2	"Revelations 205"	Second season	June 25, 2012
3	"Revelations 212"	Second season finale and upcoming third season	August 13, 2012
4	"Back to the Pack"	First two seasons and upcoming third season	May 27, 2013
5	"Revelations 307"	Third season	July 15, 2013
6	"Revelations 312"	Third season mid-season finale and premiere	August 19, 2013
7	"The Final Season"	Sixth finale premiere	July 23, 2017
8	"Teen Wolf Top Ten Moments"	Complete series	July 30, 2017

=== Wolf Watch ===
No. overall	No. in season	Episode discussed	Original episode	Original release date
Season 3, Part 2
1	1	"Anchors"	Season 3, Episode 13	January 6, 2014
2	2	"More Bad Than Good"	Season 3, Episode 14	January 13, 2014
3	3	"Galvanize"	Season 3, Episode 15	January 20, 2014
4	4	"Illuminated"	Season 3, Episode 16	January 27, 2014
5	5	"Silverfinger"	Season 3, Episode 17	February 3, 2014
6	6	"Riddled"	Season 3, Episode 18	February 10, 2014
7	7	"Letharia Vulpina"	Season 3, Episode 19	February 17, 2014
8	8	"Echo House"	Season 3, Episode 20	February 24, 2014
9	9	"The Fox and the Wolf"	Season 3, Episode 21	March 3, 2014
10	10	"De-Void"	Season 3, Episode 22	March 10, 2014
11	11	"Insatiable"	Season 3, Episode 23	March 17, 2014
12	12	"The Divine Move"	Season 3, Episode 24	March 24, 2014
Season 4
13	1	"The Dark Moon"	Season 4, Episode 1	June 23, 2014
14	2	"117"	Season 4, Episode 2	June 30, 2014
15	3	"Muted"	Season 4, Episode 3	July 7, 2014
16	4	"The Benefactor"	Season 4, Episode 4	July 14, 2014
17	5	"I.E.D."	Season 4, Episode 5	July 21, 2014
18	6	"Orphaned"	Season 4, Episode 6	July 28, 2014
19	7	"Weaponized"	Season 4, Episode 7	August 4, 2014
20	8	"Time of Death"	Season 4, Episode 8	August 11, 2014
21	9	"Perishable"	Season 4, Episode 9	August 18, 2014
22	10	"Monstrous"	Season 4, Episode 10	August 24, 2014
23	11	"A Promise to the Dead"	Season 4, Episode 11	September 1, 2014
24	12	"Smoke and Mirrors"	Season 4, Episode 12	September 8, 2014
Season 5, Part 1
25	1	"Creatures of the Night"	Season 5, Episode 1	June 29, 2015
26	2	"A Novel Approach"	Season 5, Episode 5	July 20, 2015
27	3	"Strange Frequencies"	Season 5, Episode 7	August 3, 2015
28	4	"Status Asthmaticus"	Season 5, Episode 10	August 24, 2015

== Ratings ==
Teen Wolf : U.S. viewers per episode (millions)

Season	Episode number											
Season	1	2	3	4	5	6	7	8	9	10	11	12
1	2.17	1.47	1.82	1.80	1.68	1.21	1.66	1.76	1.93	1.49	1.74	2.08
2	2.11	1.75	1.76	1.69	1.65	1.65	1.72	1.33	1.65	1.60	1.72	1.71
3A	2.36	2.11	1.67	1.91	1.63	1.86	1.82	1.78	1.77	1.97	1.91	2.08
3B	2.43	1.91	2.00	1.87	2.26	2.09	2.12	1.94	2.06	1.80	2.00	2.26
4	2.18	1.55	1.55	1.72	1.61	1.56	1.75	1.68	1.48	1.44	1.29	1.54
5A	1.53	1.18	1.38	1.01	1.26	1.14	1.09	1.10	1.10	0.96	–	
5B	1.11	0.93	0.91	0.92	0.98	0.88	0.97	0.76	0.91	0.80	–	
6A	0.57	0.41	0.43	0.51	0.55	0.45	0.43	0.44	0.49	0.45	–	
6B	0.52	0.47	0.43	0.44	0.37	0.44	0.42	0.43	0.39	0.67	–	

Audience measurement performed by Nielsen Media Research
