= Teen Wolf (2011 TV series) =

American supernatural teen drama television series

- Genre: Supernatural thriller; Teen drama
- Based on: Teen Wolf by: Jeph Loeb; Matthew Weisman
- Developed by: Jeff Davis
- Starring: Tyler Posey; Crystal Reed; Dylan O'Brien; Tyler Hoechlin; Holland Roden; Colton Haynes; Shelley Hennig; Arden Cho; Dylan Sprayberry; Linden Ashby; Melissa Ponzio; JR Bourne
- Composer: Dino Meneghin
- Country of origin: United States
- Original language: English
- No. of seasons: 6
- No. of episodes: 100 (list of episodes)

Production
- Executive producers: Jeff Davis; Marty Adelstein; René Echevarria; Michael Thorn; Tony DiSanto; Liz Gateley; Russell Mulcahy; Joseph P. Genier; Tim Andrew; Karen Gorodetzky
- Producers: Eric Wallace; Graham Vanderbilt; Blaine Williams; Tyler Posey; Ross Maxwell
- Production locations: Atlanta, Georgia; Los Angeles, California
- Cinematography: Jonathan Hall; Rich Paisley; David Daniel
- Editors: Gabriel Flemming; Alyssa Clark; Gregory Cusumano; Edward R. Abroms; David Daniel; Kim Powell; Kevin Mock
- Running time: 40–53 minutes
- Production companies: Adelstein Productions; DiGa Vision; First Cause Inc.; Lost Marbles Television; Siesta Productions; MTV Production Development; MGM Television

Original release
- Network: MTV
- Release: June 5, 2011 – September 24, 2017

Related
- Teen Wolf; Teen Wolf Too; Teen Wolf (1986 TV series); Teen Wolf: The Movie

Teen Wolf is an American supernatural teen drama television series developed by Jeff Davis for MTV. Serving as a supernatural reimagining of the 1985 film of the same name, the series is the fourth installment overall in the titular franchise. Tyler Posey portrays a young werewolf who defends his California town from supernatural creatures and other threats.

The series premiered on June 5, 2011, and concluded on September 24, 2017, after six seasons. It received generally positive reviews from critics and won three Saturn Awards for Best Youth-Oriented Television Series. The series also received thirteen Teen Choice Awards, nine for the performances of Posey, Dylan O'Brien, Tyler Hoechlin, Holland Roden and Shelley Hennig, and four for Choice Summer TV Series.

A film continuation, Teen Wolf: The Movie, was released on Paramount+ on January 26, 2023.

== Synopsis ==
Teen Wolf revolves around Scott McCall, a high school student living in the fictional California town of Beacon Hills. Scott becomes the eponymous teenage werewolf of the series after he is bitten by an alpha werewolf the night before his second year of high school, drastically changing his once-ordinary life. The bite forces him to balance his new identity with day-to-day teenage life and eventually help protect his hometown, which he learns is a beacon for supernatural activity.

Scott begins the series as a relatively unpopular and unathletic student who lives with his divorced mother Melissa, a nurse at Beacon Hills Memorial Hospital. As a werewolf, he develops heightened physical abilities and senses well beyond those of an ordinary human, but he also must control animalistic instincts that are amplified by feelings of aggression and full moons. Further complicating matters, Scott develops romantic feelings for new classmate Allison Argent, who comes from a family of werewolf hunters that includes her father Chris Argent. Helping Scott manage his new life are his best friend Stiles Stilinski, the son of Beacon Hills Sheriff Stilinski, and the natural-born werewolf Derek Hale. The supernatural events surrounding Beacon Hills also end up affecting Lydia Martin, a popular and intelligent student who discovers that she is a banshee, and Jackson Whittemore, the captain of the school's lacrosse team who resents Scott's newfound attention. As new and familiar threats emerge, Scott is joined by werecoyote Malia Tate, kitsune Kira Yukimura, and Scott's first beta werewolf Liam Dunbar in keeping his family, friends, and the rest of the town safe.

== Cast and characters ==
- Tyler Posey as Scott McCall: Scott is turned into a werewolf in the series premiere. Together with his friend Stiles, they begin to uncover the complicated supernatural world of Beacon Hills, California.
- Crystal Reed (seasons 1–3; guest season 5) as Allison Argent: Scott's first love interest, Allison descends from a long line of werewolf hunters. Her formidable prowess with a bow and arrow is an asset to the team in encounters with the shapeshifters and monsters that roam Beacon Hills. Reed also portrays Allison's ancestor Marie-Jeanne Valet in the fifth season.
- Dylan O'Brien as Stiles Stilinski: Stiles is Scott's childhood best friend, with a talent for solving mysteries and a fierce loyalty to those closest to him. As a young child, Stiles is portrayed by Anthony Lapenna. O'Brien also portrays the Nogitsune, a demon who possesses Stiles.
- Tyler Hoechlin (seasons 1–4; guest season 6) as Derek Hale: An older werewolf from a prominent werewolf family in Beacon Hills, Derek starts off with a hostile relationship towards Scott and his "pack" of friends, but comes to be a valuable ally. Ian Nelson portrays the teenage Derek.
- Holland Roden as Lydia Martin: A popular girl at Beacon Hills High and a close friend of Allison's. Lydia initially tries to play down her formidable intelligence, but she is a genius. After an encounter with Derek's villainous uncle Peter Hale in season one, her own supernatural abilities—those of a banshee—begin to manifest.
- Colton Haynes (seasons 1–2; guest season 6) as Jackson Whittemore: Lydia's shallow boyfriend. Jackson antagonizes Scott and Stiles relentlessly but suffers from inner self-hatred. This causes his encounter with a werewolf's bite to turn him into another sort of creature: the deadly reptilian kanima. Jackson abruptly leaves Beacon Hills in the gap between seasons two and three, but returns for a guest stint at the end of season six, having come out and entered a relationship with another werewolf, Ethan.
- Shelley Hennig (seasons 4–6; recurring season 3) as Malia Tate: The daughter of Peter Hale and a werecoyote assassin, Malia was adopted into a local Beacon Hills family for her own safety. After her new family is killed, she spends her formative years as a fully transformed feral coyote. After rejoining the human social world, she develops a blunt, no-nonsense personality, while adjusting to teenage life as a fish out of water.
- Arden Cho (seasons 4–5; recurring season 3) as Kira Yukimura: Kira moves to Beacon Hills as monsters from Japanese mythology are beginning to plague the lives of her new classmates; she herself discovers that she is a thunder kitsune with profound swordsmanship skills and electrical powers. Cho also portrays Kira's mother Noshiko as a young woman.
- Dylan Sprayberry (seasons 5–6; recurring season 4) as Liam Dunbar: Liam is a younger rival of Scott's with anger issues. Scott is forced to transform him into a werewolf in order to save his life. Liam's anger gives him an uncommon degree of strength for a young werewolf, and he comes to develop a real respect for his mentor, Scott.
- Linden Ashby (season 6; recurring seasons 1–5) as Sheriff Noah Stilinski: Noah is initially reluctant to help his son and Scott with their escapades but is later brought into their supernatural secret. From then on, he assists his son by deploying the resources of the police department to help when he can.
- Melissa Ponzio (season 6; recurring seasons 1–5) as Melissa McCall: Scott's mother, a local nurse, becomes an invaluable ally of the gang once brought in on their secret, concealing unexplained supernatural occurrences and saving the lives of Scott and his pack members many times over.
- JR Bourne (season 6; recurring seasons 1–5) as Chris Argent: Allison's father is a born and raised werewolf hunter who is highly effective at what he does. He later comes around to see Scott as a vital protector of Beacon Hills and dedicates himself to supporting his cause. Max Lloyd Jones portrays the young Argent.

== Episodes ==
Teen Wolf premiered on June 5, 2011, following the 2011 MTV Movie Awards. The second season premiered on June 3, 2012, after the 2012 MTV Movie Awards. On July 12, 2012, Teen Wolf was renewed for a third season, which includes 24 episodes and the production location was moved to Los Angeles, California.

The third season premiered on June 3, 2013, at 10 pm, giving the series a new high on ratings. A fourth season premiered on June 23, 2014. On July 24, 2014, MTV renewed Teen Wolf for a fifth season of 20 episodes, which was split into two parts, and premiered June 29, 2015.

On July 9, 2015, Teen Wolf was renewed for a sixth season of 20 episodes. Showrunner Jeff Davis confirmed that Tyler Posey, Dylan O'Brien, Holland Roden, Shelley Hennig and Dylan Sprayberry would be reprising their roles as Scott McCall, Stiles Stilinski, Lydia Martin, Malia Tate and Liam Dunbar respectively.

Season	Episodes		Originally released		Avg. viewers (millions)
Season	Episodes		First released	Last released	Avg. viewers (millions)
1	12		June 5, 2011	August 15, 2011	1.73
2	12		June 3, 2012	August 13, 2012	1.69
3	24	12	June 3, 2013	August 19, 2013	1.97
3	24	12	January 6, 2014	March 24, 2014	1.97
4	12		June 23, 2014	September 8, 2014	1.61
5	20	10	June 29, 2015	August 24, 2015	1.05
5	20	10	January 5, 2016	March 8, 2016	1.05
6	20	10	November 15, 2016	January 31, 2017	0.47
6	20	10	July 30, 2017	September 24, 2017	0.47

== Development and production ==
In June 2009, MTV announced that they would be adapting the 1985 film Teen Wolf into a new television series "with a greater emphasis on romance, horror and werewolf mythology". The film had been previously adapted for television as an animated series that aired on CBS in 1986–87.

For the MTV series, creator and executive producer, Jeff Davis, aimed to develop a darker, sexier and edgier version than the 1985 film. Davis' desire was to make a thriller with comedic overtones but in a tone more similar to that of the 1987 vampire film The Lost Boys. According to Davis, it all started with an idea to do a homage to Stand by Me, where in the beginning, the kids go out and search for a body in the woods and it's not quite what they expect. The look of the show was inspired in part by Guillermo del Toro's creatures in Pan's Labyrinth; the producers described the werewolves as beautiful, elegant and scary, at the same time.

Once the show was a go, Davis lined up Australian director Russell Mulcahy, who added the horror to the project. Mulcahy directed the pilot presentation and serves as executive producer and in-house director.

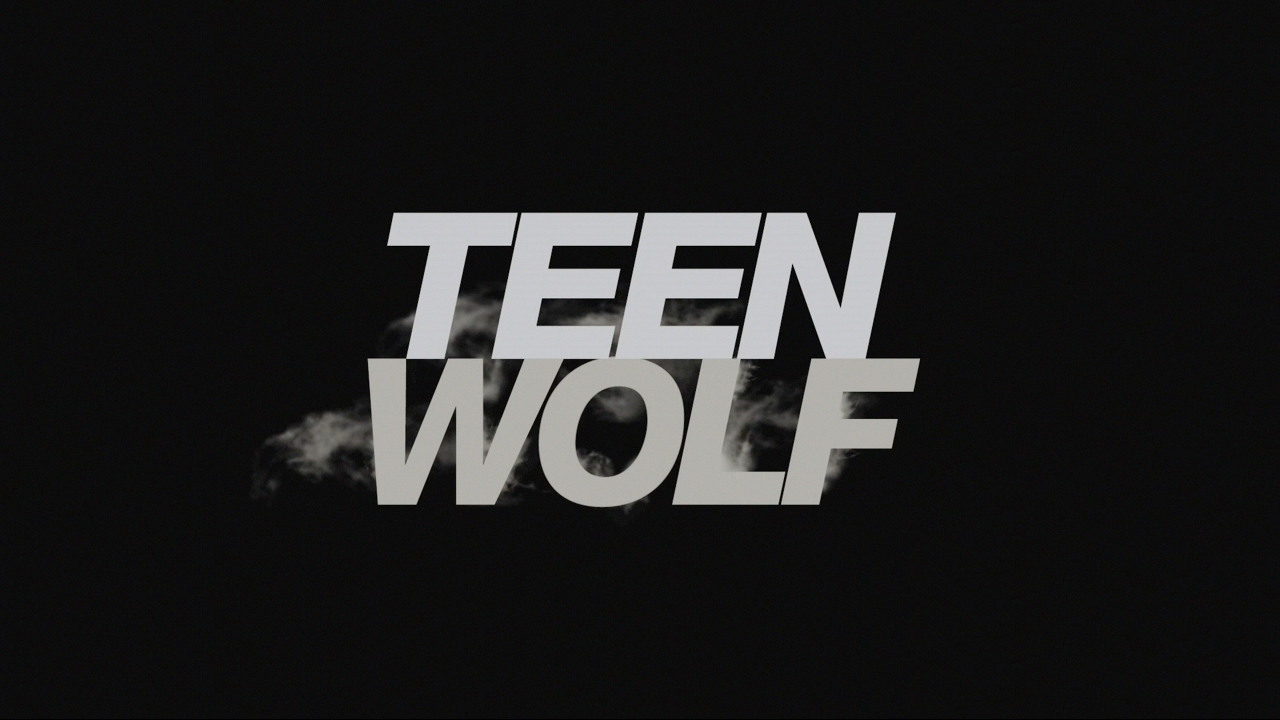
The title card from season one.

Casting announcements were all announced in December 2010, with the main cast being, Tyler Posey, Crystal Reed, Tyler Hoechlin, Dylan O'Brien, Holland Roden, and Colton Haynes. Posey was cast as lead Scott McCall, a dorky high-school student who after being bitten by a werewolf, starts to notice changes in himself. Reed was cast as Allison Argent, a sweet new girl at school who is immediately attracted to Scott; Hoechlin as Derek Hale, a handsome local boy who in fact is a vicious and predatory werewolf; O'Brien as Stiles, Scott's best friend; Roden as Lydia Martin, Jackson Whittemore's popular and controlling girlfriend; and Haynes as Jackson Whittemore, Scott's lacrosse teammate and rival.

Production on twelve episodes began in October 2010 in Atlanta, Georgia. MTV released a sneak peek of the first eight minutes of the pilot on their website, on May 31, 2011. Teen Wolf episodes are composed by music composer Dino Meneghin. As of Season 2, the opening credits of the show changed dramatically to a longer format featuring the main characters appearing whilst performing an action (such as Colton Haynes performing a lacrosse throw), along with the respective names of the actors.

The new opening credits also feature the show's new theme song. In June 2012, the series received conditional approval for a California film and TV tax credit. At Comic-Con 2012, the cast confirmed that the show had been renewed for a longer third season, comprising twenty-four episodes. In June 2013, the series was selected again for a California tax credit.

On September 24, 2021, Paramount+ ordered a reunion film for the series, entitled Teen Wolf: The Movie, with most of the cast expected to return, with the exception of Dylan O'Brien, Arden Cho and Cody Christian.

== Differences and similarities from films ==
Teen Wolf shares no continuity with the 1985 film Teen Wolf or its sequel, Teen Wolf Too, but does contain allusions to the film which inspired its premise. The original film is about a typical awkward basketball-playing teenager named Scott dealing with high school and life as a werewolf. In both the film and show, Scott reaps the benefits of werewolf stardom, achieving confidence and acceptance from his peers with his newly-discovered powers, and has a close friend named Stiles. In the 1985 movie, Scott played basketball, whereas in the series, he plays lacrosse; Stiles wears retro British T-shirts in the TV series rather than the offensive T-shirts of the film; and Scott is transformed into a werewolf by bite in the series, whereas in the film he inherits the trait from his father.

While the Teen Wolf films are comedies, the MTV series is a drama that contains comedic elements as well as dark themes, violence, and gore. The writers decided early on to exclude vampires from their in-show mythology.

== Reception ==
=== Critical response ===
Critical response of Teen Wolf
Season	Rotten Tomatoes	Metacritic
1	68% (25 reviews)	61 (14 reviews)
2	90% (10 reviews)	—N/a
3	88% (17 reviews)	—N/a
4	67% (12 reviews)	—N/a
5	92% (12 reviews)	—N/a
6	83% (12 reviews)	—N/a

The first season of the series generated a generally positive response from professional critics, with some praising it as better quality when compared to other shows by MTV. According to Metacritic, which assigns a rating out of 100 to reviews from mainstream critics, the show holds an average score of 61 out of 100, which indicates "Generally favorable reviews", based on fourteen reviews. Metacritic also lists the show as the second-highest rated MTV series by professional critics behind Awkward.

Review aggregator Rotten Tomatoes reports that 68% of 25 critics have given the first season a positive review. The site's consensus is: "Thanks to a charismatic lead in Tyler Posey and some dark, biting humor, Teen Wolf is a pleasant summer surprise, even if it does tread familiar ground." Linda Stasi, a writer from the New York Post, awarded the series' premiere a perfect score, stating, "Not only is it really well thought out, but the good-looking kids in the show can actually act." Verne Gay from Newsday also reserved high praise for the show, calling it a "winner and best of all, fun". David Hinckley of New York Daily News commented favorably on the series, ending his review with "Werewolves, pretty girls, dumb bullies and lacrosse. What more, really, could you ask of high school?" Film critic Rex Reed is a fan of the series, calling it "the sexiest show on television today."

Some critics had a less positive reaction toward the first episode. Troy Patterson from Slate gave it a mixed review, referring to it as "light and passably witty supernatural drama". James Poniewozik from Time magazine also had mixed feelings towards the show, saying, "The pilot isn't bad, exactly—it's well-paced if a little dour in spots and there's some decent CW-esque banter—but it's pretty much entirely what I would have expected from any supernatural teen drama". Following the first-season finale in August 2011, Ian Grey of IndieWire gave the series a positive review and Angel Cohn of Television Without Pity named it the third best new show of the summer. BuddyTV ranked Teen Wolf #4 on its list of 2011's best new TV shows.

The second season of the show received even more positive reviews than the first, with Rotten Tomatoes reporting a 90% approval rating based on 10 critical reviews. The third season also received positive reviews, earning an approval rating of 88% based on 17 reviews.

Despite its generally positive reception, the show struggled with its representation of LGBTQ characters and issues and was critiqued for queerbaiting.

=== Ratings ===
The series premiere attracted a total of 2.17 million viewers. After airing its third episode, Teen Wolf was reported to be heading into its fourth week with tremendous momentum following a 23 percent increase among persons 12–34, with a 1.6 in the demo. With double digit percentage gains among total viewers and key demos, Teen Wolf was the #1 show in its timeslot with women 12–34. The first-season finale attained a series high in persons 12–34 (1.9) and 2.1 million viewers overall, as well as being first in its timeslot among teens and females 12–34.

The show's creator, Jeff Davis, confirmed that the show benefits from a very significant online viewership, with up to eight million streams per episode on MTV's online platforms alone. Davis cited this as a significant contributing factor to MTV renewing the show for a sixth season.

Viewership and ratings per season of Teen Wolf
Season	Timeslot (ET)	Episodes	First aired		Last aired		TV season	Avg. viewers (millions)
Season	Timeslot (ET)	Episodes	Date	Viewers (millions)	Date	Viewers (millions)	TV season	Avg. viewers (millions)
1	Monday 10:00 pm	12	June 5, 2011	2.17	August 15, 2011	2.08	2010–11	1.73
2	Monday 10:00 pm	12	June 4, 2012	2.11	August 13, 2012	1.71	2011–12	1.69
3	Monday 10:00 pm	24	June 3, 2013	2.36	March 24, 2014	2.26	2013–14	1.97
4	Monday 10:00 pm	12	June 23, 2014	2.18	September 8, 2014	1.54	2013–14	1.61
5	Monday 10:00 pm (Part 1); Tuesday 9:00 pm (Part 2)	20	June 29, 2015	1.53	March 8, 2016	0.80	2015–16	1.05
6	Tuesday 9:00 pm (Part 1); Sunday 8:00 pm (Part 2)	20	November 15, 2016	0.57	September 24, 2017	0.68	2016–17	0.47

== Other media ==
=== Book ===
- 2012, Nancy Holder, On Fire: A Teen Wolf Novel, Simon & Schuster, ISBN 9781451674477

In June 2012, MTV Books released the book On Fire, by Nancy Holder. The cover art features Tyler Posey with glowing yellow eyes, with a fire red background. The book tells the story of Scott McCall and the first season of Teen Wolf.

=== Comic ===
A comic themed upon the show was released in June 2011 by Image Comics.

== Accolades ==
Year	Award	Category	Nominee(s)	Result	Ref(s)
2011	Teen Choice Awards	Breakout Star	Tyler Posey	Nominated	
2011	Teen Choice Awards	Choice Summer TV Show	Teen Wolf	Nominated	
2011	Teen Choice Awards	Choice Summer TV Star – Female	Crystal Reed	Nominated	
2011	Teen Choice Awards	Choice Summer TV Star – Male	Tyler Posey	Nominated	
2011	Teen Choice Awards	Choice TV Actress: Fantasy/Sci-Fi	Crystal Reed	Nominated	
2011	Teen Choice Awards	Choice TV Fantasy/Sci-Fi	Teen Wolf	Nominated	
2012	ALMA Award	Favorite TV Actor – Leading Role	Tyler Posey	Won	
2012	Imagen Award	Best Actor/Television	Tyler Posey	Nominated	
2012	Saturn Awards	Best Youth-Oriented Series on Television	Teen Wolf	Won	
2012	Teen Choice Awards	Choice Summer TV Show	Teen Wolf	Won	
2012	Teen Choice Awards	Choice Summer TV Star – Female	Crystal Reed	Nominated	
2012	Teen Choice Awards	Choice Summer TV Star – Male	Tyler Posey	Won	
2013	Saturn Awards	Best Youth-Oriented Series on Television	Teen Wolf	Won	
2013	Teen Choice Award	Choice Summer TV Show	Teen Wolf	Nominated	
2013	Teen Choice Award	Choice Summer TV Star – Male	Tyler Posey	Nominated	
2013	Young Hollywood Awards	Best Ensemble	Tyler Posey; Crystal Reed; Dylan O'Brien; Tyler Hoechlin; Holland Roden	Won	
2014	Saturn Awards	Best Youth-Oriented Series on Television	Teen Wolf	Won	
2014	Teen Choice Awards	Choice Scene Stealer: Male	Tyler Hoechlin	Won	
2014	Teen Choice Awards	Choice TV: Actor Sci-Fi/Fantasy	Tyler Posey	Nominated	
2014	Teen Choice Awards	Choice TV: Sci-Fi/Fantasy Series	Teen Wolf	Nominated	
2014	Teen Choice Awards	Choice TV: Villain	Dylan O'Brien	Won	
2014	Young Hollywood Awards	Bingeworthy TV Show	Teen Wolf	Nominated	
2015	Saturn Awards	Best Performance by a Younger Actor in a Television Series	Tyler Posey	Nominated	
2015	Saturn Awards	Best Youth-Oriented Television Series	Teen Wolf	Nominated	
2015	Teen Choice Awards	Choice Summer TV Show	Teen Wolf	Won	
2015	Teen Choice Awards	Choice Summer TV Star: Male	Tyler Posey	Nominated	
2015	Teen Choice Awards	Choice TV: Scene Stealer	Dylan O'Brien	Won	
2015	Teen Choice Awards	Choice TV: Villain	The Dread Doctors	Nominated	
2016	People's Choice Awards	Favorite Cable TV Sci-Fi/Fantasy Show	Teen Wolf	Nominated	
2016	Saturn Awards	Best Guest Star on Television	Steven Brand	Nominated	
2016	Saturn Awards	Best Horror Television Series	Teen Wolf	Nominated	
2016	Saturn Awards	Best Performance by a Younger Actor in a Television Series	Dylan Sprayberry	Nominated	
2016	Teen Choice Awards	Choice Summer TV Actor	Dylan O'Brien	Won	
2016	Teen Choice Awards	Choice Summer TV Actor	Tyler Posey	Nominated	
2016	Teen Choice Awards	Choice Summer TV Actress	Shelley Hennig	Won	
2016	Teen Choice Awards	Choice Summer TV Show	Teen Wolf	Won	
2017	People's Choice Awards	Favorite Cable TV Sci-Fi/Fantasy Actor	Tyler Posey	Nominated	
2017	People's Choice Awards	Favorite Cable TV Sci-Fi/Fantasy Show	Teen Wolf	Nominated	
2017	Saturn Awards	Best Guest Performance on a Television Series	Ian Bohen	Nominated	
2017	Saturn Awards	Best Horror Television Series	Teen Wolf	Nominated	
2017	Saturn Awards	Best Supporting Actor on a Television Series	Linden Ashby	Nominated	
2017	Teen Choice Awards	Choice Sci-Fi/Fantasy TV Actor	Dylan O'Brien	Won	
2017	Teen Choice Awards	Choice Sci-Fi/Fantasy TV Show	Teen Wolf	Nominated	
2017	Teen Choice Awards	Choice Summer TV Actor	Cody Christian	Nominated	
2017	Teen Choice Awards	Choice Summer TV Actor	Tyler Posey	Won	
2017	Teen Choice Awards	Choice Summer TV Actress	Shelley Hennig	Nominated	
2017	Teen Choice Awards	Choice Summer TV Actress	Holland Roden	Won	
2017	Teen Choice Awards	Choice Summer TV Show	Teen Wolf	Won	
2017	Teen Choice Awards	Choice TV Ship	Holland Roden and Dylan O'Brien	Nominated	
2017	Young Artist Awards	Best Performance in a TV Series - Guest Starring Teen Actor	Rio Mangini	Won	
2018	Saturn Awards	Best Horror Television Series	Teen Wolf	Nominated	

== Broadcast ==
Canada's MuchMusic aired the series until 2014, when it was moved to the domestic version of MTV. The United Kingdom's BSkyB aired the first two seasons on pay television channel Sky Living. BSkyB stopped broadcasting Teen Wolf after the second-season finale.

== Bibliography ==
- Elliott, J.; Fowler, M. (June 2018). "'Smile, Derek. Why Don't You Smile More?': The Objectification of Derek Hale and Queerbaiting in MTV's Teen Wolf". Journal of Fandom Studies. 6 (2): 145–166. doi:10.1386/jfs.6.2.145_1. ISSN 2046-6692.
- Johnson, M. Jr. (January 2016). "The Homoerotics and Monstrous Otherness of Teen Wolf". Studies in the Humanities. 43 (1–2): 65–81. ISSN 0039-3800. OCLC 613312530.
- Kendal, E.; Kendal, Z. (November 2015). "Consent Is Sexy: Gender, Sexual Identity and Sex Positivism in MTV's Young Adult Television Series Teen Wolf (2011–)". Colloquy: Text, Theory, Critique (30): 26–41. doi:10.4225/03/59240d6cbd9b4.
