= Crystal Reed =

American actress (born 1985)

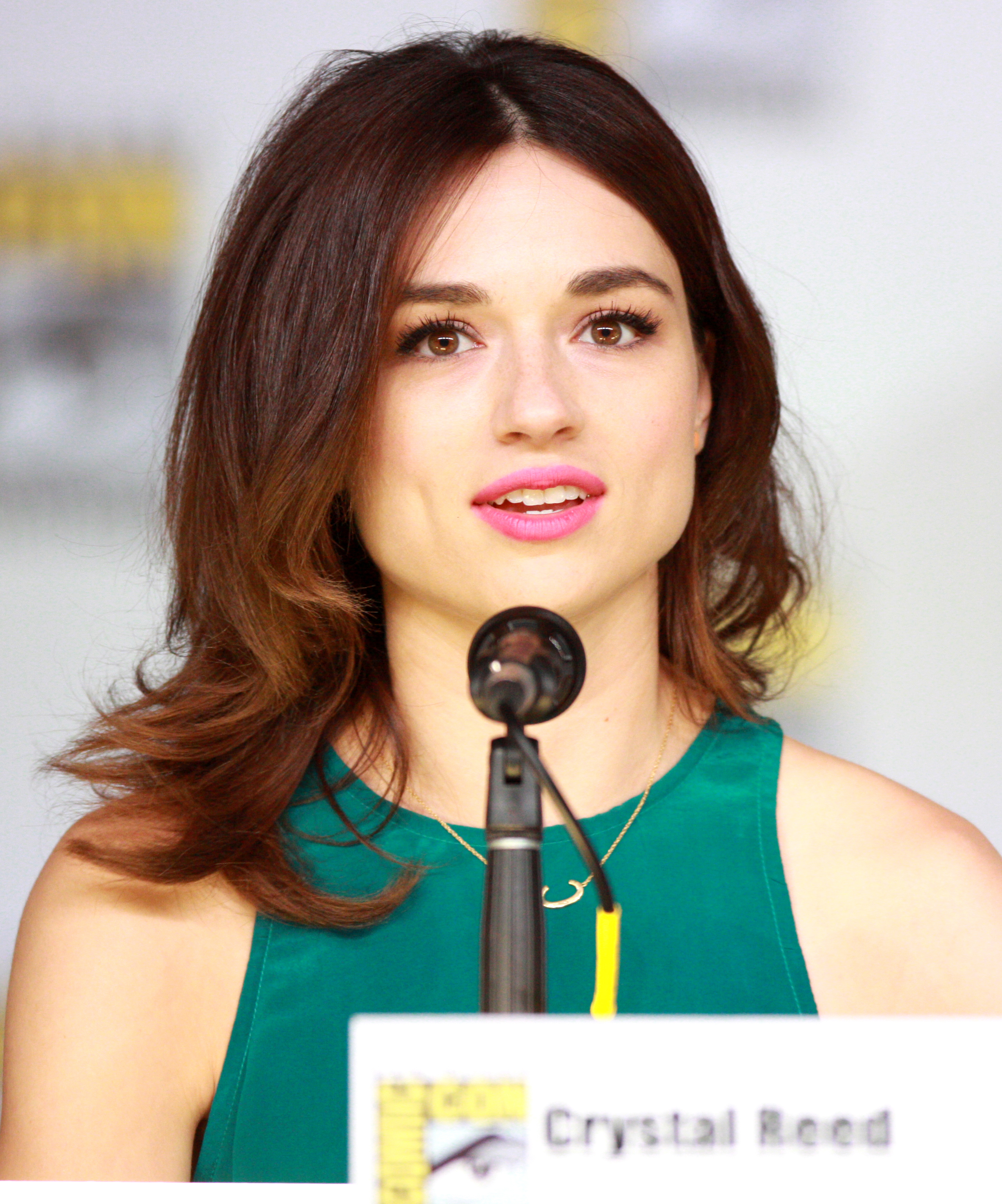
- Reed in 2013
- Born: Crystal Marie Reed; February 6, 1985 (age 41); Detroit, Michigan, U.S.
- Occupation: Actress
- Years active: 2010–present

Crystal Marie Reed (born February 6, 1985) is an American actress. She came to prominence playing Allison Argent in the series Teen Wolf (2011–2014). She departed the series after the third season but made a guest appearance in the fifth season as Allison's ancestor Marie-Jeanne Valet. Reed went on to reprise her role as Allison Argent in the reunion film Teen Wolf: The Movie (2023).

Reed played Sofia Falcone in the fourth season of Gotham (2017–2018) and the lead role of Abby Arcane in the series Swamp Thing (2019). She has also appeared in the films Skyline (2010), Crush (2013), Too Late (2015) and Ghostland (2018).

== Early life and education ==
Reed was born and raised in Detroit to Polish and Native American parents. Reed was raised in a conservative Catholic family, though she has also stated that she attended a Baptist church growing up and did not enjoy it. "I absolutely hated it and I knew that I would never fit in," Reed said.

She graduated from Roseville High School, in Roseville, in 2003. Reed studied dance from an early age and was a dance captain in high school. She was an active member of her local community theatre and starred in the musicals Annie, Fiddler on the Roof and Grease. She attended Wayne State University and was a part of the Bachelor of Fine Arts program, but left the program when she questioned whether it was the right fit for her. "I auditioned for the prestigious BFA conservatory program," she said. "They were very strict about the methods of acting, very particular about how we do things and I started questioning whether or not it was the right place for me, and whether or not [one] truly needed a degree to be an artist." She moved to Chicago and appeared in a number of local productions. In December 2008, she moved to Hollywood to pursue a screen career.

== Career ==
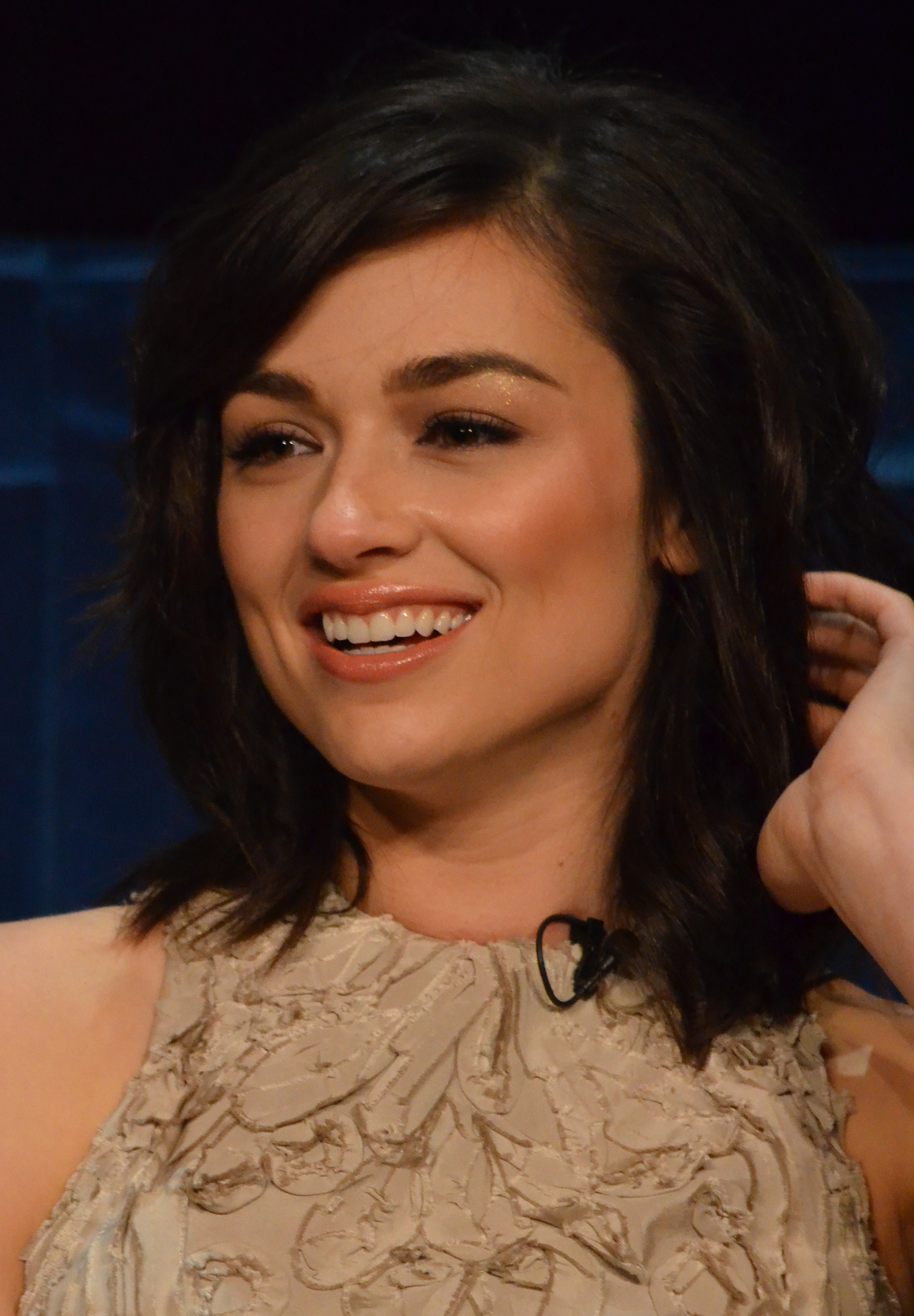
Reed in 2012

In 2010, Reed guest starred in CSI: Crime Scene Investigation, CSI: NY, Rizzoli & Isles and The Hard Times of RJ Berger. The following year, she began playing Allison Argent in the MTV series Teen Wolf. Before the third season of the series, Reed wanted to move on from the show, do different things and explore other areas of film creatively. She approached executive producer of the show, Jeff Davis, who supported her decision. Reed left the show in March 2014 in the form of Allison Argent's death at the end of the third season. Reed also stated that her desire to leave the show had to do with the difference in age to her character. Reed was 29 years old playing a 17-year-old by the end of season three. She appeared in the February 23, 2016, episode, "The Maid of Gévaudan" as the first Argent werewolf hunter Marie-Jeanne Valet. While promoting Gotham, Reed said that she would love to be a part of a reboot or spin-off of Teen Wolf.

Reed's film credits include Skyline and Crazy, Stupid, Love. She starred in the horror film Ghostland, written and directed by French filmmaker Pascal Laugier. The film was first released in France on March 14, 2018.

On July 22, 2017, Reed was cast in the fourth season of the Fox television series Gotham as Sofia Falcone, the daughter of Carmine Falcone. The fourth season of Gotham premiered on September 21, 2017. Reed's portrayal of Falcone is the first time the comic-book character has been in a television show or movie.

On September 6, 2018, it was reported that Reed had been cast in the lead of the DC Universe television series Swamp Thing. She portrayed Abby Arcane, a smart and caring CDC doctor who returns to her hometown in Louisiana and investigates what seems to be a deadly swamp-born virus but soon discovers that the swamp holds mystical and terrifying secrets. Swamp Thing premiered on May 31, 2019.

In September 2021, it was announced that a reunion film for Teen Wolf had been ordered by Paramount+, with Jeff Davis returning as a screenwriter and executive producer of the film. The majority of the original cast members, including Reed, were set to reprise their roles. The film was released on January 26, 2023.

== Personal life ==
Reed has said she moved out of her hometown because it "was completely small-minded and not accepting of things that I'm accepting of".

Reed campaigned for Hillary Clinton leading up to the 2016 United States presidential election.

Reed lists golf as one of her hobbies when she is not acting.

== Filmography ==
=== Film ===
Year	Title	Role	Notes
2010	Skyline	Denise	
2011	Crazy, Stupid, Love.	Amy Johnson	
2012	Jewtopia	Rebecca Ogin	
2013	Crush	Bess	Direct-to-video film
2015	Too Late	Dorothy Mahler	
2018	Ghostland	Elizabeth "Beth" Keller	
2022	Pinball: The Man Who Saved the Game	Ellen	
2023	Teen Wolf: The Movie	Allison Argent	

=== Television ===
Year	Title	Role	Notes
2010	CSI: Crime Scene Investigation	Julie	Episode: "Lost & Found"
2010	CSI: NY	Jules Roday	Episode: "Damned If You Do"
2010	The Hard Times of RJ Berger	Renee	Episode: "The Berger Cometh"
2010	Rizzoli & Isles	Natalie	Episode: "She Works Hard for the Money"
2011	Drop Dead Diva	Ali	Episode: "He Said, She Said"
2011–2014, 2016	Teen Wolf	Allison Argent	Main role (seasons 1–3)
2011–2014, 2016	Teen Wolf	Marie-Jeanne Valet	Episode: "Maid of Gévaudan"
2017–2018	Gotham	Sofia Falcone	Main role (season 4)
2019	Swamp Thing	Abby Arcane	Main role

== Awards and nominations ==
Year	Awards	Category	Work	Result	Ref.
2011	Teen Choice Awards	Choice Summer TV Star – Female	Teen Wolf	Nominated	
2011	Teen Choice Awards	Choice TV Actress: Fantasy/Sci-Fi	Teen Wolf	Nominated	
2012	Teen Choice Awards	Choice Summer TV Star – Female	Teen Wolf	Nominated	
2013	Young Hollywood Awards	Best Ensemble (shared with Tyler Posey, Dylan O'Brien, Tyler Hoechlin, and Holland Roden)	Teen Wolf	Won	
