= Tim Andrew =

American film director

- Occupations: Film director, television director, television producer
- Years active: 1994–present

Tim Andrew is a British film director, television director and television producer. His television directing credits include Black Scorpion, Son of the Beach, Undressed, Mix It Up, Supernatural and Teen Wolf, where he was an executive producer and frequent director along with Russell Mulcahy.

He also worked as the supervising producer on the television series Home James!, reality series Denise Richards: It's Complicated, Joan & Melissa: Joan Knows Best? and the Tyler Perry-directed films Meet the Browns, The Family That Preys, Why Did I Get Married Too? and For Colored Girls.
