= Jeff Davis (television producer) =

American writer and television producer

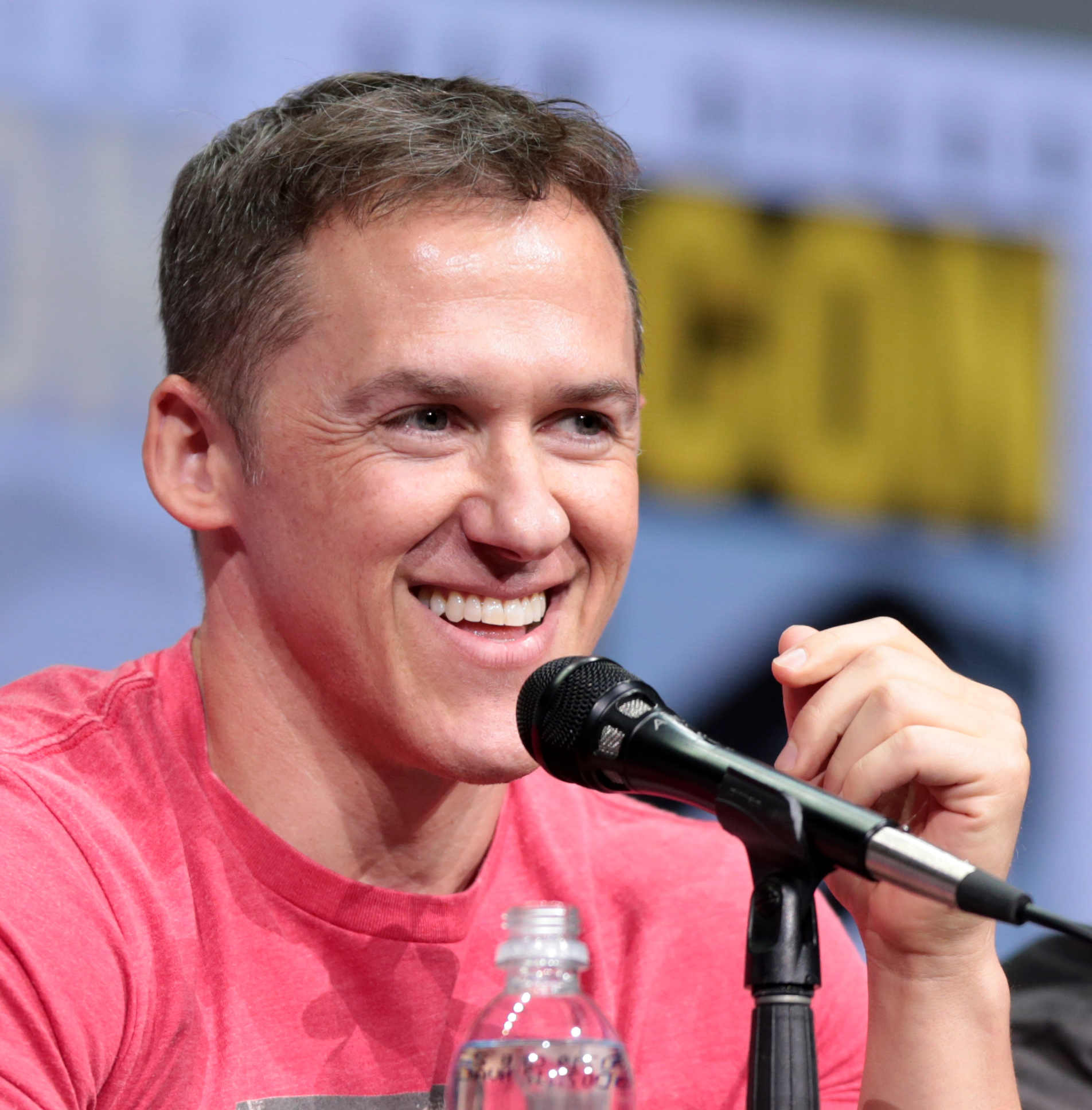
- Davis at the 2017 San Diego Comic-Con
- Born: June 13, 1975 (age 51); Milford, Connecticut, U.S.
- Occupations: Writer, television producer
- Years active: 2003–present
- Notable work: Criminal Minds; Teen Wolf

Jeff Davis (born June 13, 1975) is an American writer and television producer best known for creating Criminal Minds and the Teen Wolf 2010s TV series and 2023 movie reboot.

== Early life ==
Davis was born in Milford, Connecticut. He graduated from Vassar College with a degree in film and he then went on to receive a master's degree in screenwriting from the University of Southern California. Davis worked as a script reader, editorial assistant, writer for computer software manuals and computer support specialist in Los Angeles while struggling to sell his own writing.

== Career ==
In 2003, Davis sold a script to CBS Television that eventually became the hit series Criminal Minds. He served as co-executive producer during the first season of the show. It was produced by CBS Studios and 20th Television (previously through ABC Signature until 2025).

In 2011, Davis began talks with MTV about a reboot of the Michael J. Fox '80s comedy Teen Wolf. He says he jumped at the project due to his love of the horror genre. He notes among his influences writers Stephen King and Thomas Harris. Davis has also stated that he is a fan of The X-Files, Cheers, and Moonlighting. As executive producer, head writer and show creator, Jeff Davis was the creative force behind Teen Wolf.

After the second season of Teen Wolf ended, Davis split his time between Los Angeles and Atlanta, Georgia, where he filmed the show. Davis sold a series adaption of the Swedish horror film Let the Right One In, for the U.S. television channel A&E. The script was then ordered to pilot at TNT. The pilot was shot in Vancouver, but ultimately, TNT decided not to proceed with a series. In 2021, he signed a deal with MTV Entertainment Studios through his First Cause production company.

== Personal life ==
Davis is openly gay. Davis is also a fan of Batman, to the point of even naming characters from his hit TV show Teen Wolf after characters in Batman.

== Filmography ==
Year	Title	Writer	Executive Producer	Notes
2005-2007	Criminal Minds	Yes	Yes	Creator; Writer (3 episodes) (2005); Exec. Producer (2005–2007)
2011–2017	Teen Wolf	Yes	Yes	Creator; Writer (41 episodes)
2011	Teen Wolf: Search for a Cure	Yes	Yes	Web Series; Also Director
2012	Teen Wolf: The Hunt	No	Yes	Online game
2015	Let the Right One In	Yes	No	Unsold TV pilot
2023	Teen Wolf: The Movie	Yes	Yes	Paramount+ Original Movie
2023	Wolf Pack	Yes	Yes	Creator; Writer (2 episodes); Director (1 episode)
