= Teen Wolf (franchise) =

Film franchise

- Original logo of the franchise, 1985
- Created by: Jeph Loeb; Matthew Weisman
- Original work: Teen Wolf (1985)
- Owners: Amazon MGM Studios; Skydance

Films and television
- Films: Teen Wolf; Teen Wolf Too; Teen Wolf: The Movie
- Television series: Teen Wolf (2011)
- Web series: Teen Wolf: Search for a Cure
- Animated series: Teen Wolf: The Animated Series

The Teen Wolf franchise consists of American supernatural teen drama installments released through various media including: two theatrical films and an animated television series based on those films; a live-action reboot series, its streaming exclusive film continuation and a spin-off series which follows the ending of the film. Based on an original story by Jeph Loeb and Matthew Weisman, the plot of each release centers around adolescent individuals who are not a part of the popular crowd amongst their peers, whose lives change once they become werewolves allowing them to gain superhuman abilities. The franchise additionally includes a 1989 standalone spin-off film that was initially released in theaters which centers around a teenage witch, as well as its stage musical adaptation.

The franchise has been met with mixed reception critically. The 1985 original movie was met with a muddled critical acknowledgement with mixed praise upon release, while conversely its sequel received mostly negative response. Despite this, both films turned a profit at the box office for the studio. The 1989 standalone spin-off movie was a critical and financial failure upon release, though subsequent re-releases as well as television airings have accumulated a strong fanbase, with the film earning its status as a cult classic by modern analysis. The animated series was produced by one of Hanna-Barbera's animation studios and received warm reception from viewers, which lead to a second season being greenlit and developed to include the lead characters of the original movies meeting on screen. The reimagied dark and gritty live-action reboot television series received positive reception from critics and audiences alike, allowing the network to renew the show for six seasons. The 2023 revival streaming film which continued the story from the series was also met with mixed reception from critics who ranged from praising its use of fan service, to critiquing its delivery.

== Films ==
| Film | U.S. release date | Director | Screenwriter(s) | Story by | Producers |
|---|---|---|---|---|---|
| Teen Wolf | August 23, 1985 | Rod Daniel | Jeph Loeb & Matthew Weisman | Jeph Loeb & Matthew Weisman | Thomas Coleman, Mark Levinson, George W. Perkins, Michael Rosenblatt and Scott M. Rosenfelt |
| Teen Wolf Too | November 20, 1987 | Christopher Leitch | R. Timothy Kring | Joseph Loeb III & Matthew Weisman | Kent Bateman |
| Teen Wolf: The Movie | January 26, 2023 | Russell Mulcahy | Jeff Davis | Jeff Davis | Jeff Davis, Tyler Hoechlin, Tyler Posey, Mike Elliott and Blaine Williams |

=== Teen Wolf (1985) ===
Scott Howard, a socially awkward but smart high school student, struggles to fit in with his peers. Though he is successful in his education, he has a hard time fitting in. After some unusual changes in his physique cause him to question his reality, his entire life changes when his father Harold tells him that he is experiencing lycanthropy due to a family curse. Scott resolves to use his newfound strength and agility to his advantage, by joining the school basketball team. He quickly becomes a valuable player and an all-star athlete on the team, gaining the affection of his long-time romantic interest Pamela Wells. Just as their romance begins to thrive and he begins find the attention of his classmates that he's always wanted, he begins to question their sincerity. As Scott wonders when he can begin to understand himself, he must decide whether his popularity or his secret true-self is most important.

=== Teen Wolf Too (1987) ===
Todd Howard is unpopular and uncoordinated, but like his cousin Scott he is exceptionally advanced and adept in his studies. When he discovers that he too has the hereditary nature of a lycan, his life changes and he begins to realize the social acceptance and praise he has always wanted. With his increased physical strength, Todd quickly becomes an athletic star boxing contender. Following some outstanding physical feats during some fight matches, he receives a college scholarship on the condition that he wins an upcoming boxing championship. Alongside the fame and recognition, Todd acquires the attention of the university's attractive women as well. Despite this, he begins to wonder if the cost of stardom is really what he truly desires in his life.

=== Teen Wolf: The Movie (2023) ===
Following the events of the television series, Scott McCall who was once an adolescent alpha werewolf among his pack, must rise to the occasion and overcome all odds when a new wicked threat gains power. Beacon Hill is no longer safe to its residents, as the enemy begins to build a team of returning horrific shapeshifting creatures; an army including banshees, werecoyotes, hellhounds, and kitsunes, among others. Once again serving as a leader, Scott races to find a way to defeat the most powerful growing evil he has ever encountered, with the help of old friends and a group of new allies to aid him in his battle.

=== Potential future ===
In January 2023, Davis stated that he was open to developing future projects but that their realizing depends on the reception of Teen Wolf: The Movie. He stated that the future of the franchise would center around the son of the character Derek Hale, named Eli (portrayed by Vince Mattis); while announcing that discussions for sequel films, as well as additional television shows have been discussed. The filmmaker stated that the associated studios look to Teen Wolf as a significant source for franchise expansion, attributing the resurgence of popularity to streaming media. He expressed interest in featuring additional characters from the series that didn't appear in the film, while again stating that Eli Hale is intended to be the "new teen wolf". The same month Tyler Posey and Crystal Reed expressed excitement for reprising their starring roles again, with interest in exploring the adult experiences of the characters in the future. Davis additionally stated that he is interested in overseeing future installments being developed by other writers developing future installments, with him overseeing the franchise in a shepherding role instead.

== Television ==
| Series | Season(s) | Episode(s) | Originally released | | | Showrunner | Executive producer(s) | Status |
| Series | Season(s) | Episode(s) | First released | Last released | Network | Showrunner | Executive producer(s) | Status |
|---|---|---|---|---|---|---|---|---|
| Teen Wolf: The Animated Series | 2 | 21 | September 13, 1986 | November 7, 1987 | CBS | David Kent | Jonathan Dana, Buzz Potamkin | Ended |
| Teen Wolf | 6 | 100 | June 26, 2011 | September 24, 2017 | MTV | Jeff Davis | Jeff Davis, Marty Adelstein, René Echevarria, Michael Thorn, Tony DiSanto, Liz Gateley, Russell Mulcahy, Joseph P. Genier, Tim Andrew, Karen Gorodetzky | Ended |

=== Teen Wolf: The Animated Series (1986–1987) ===
Scott Howard is an upstanding and well-behaved young man who deals with a frightening situation that includes a family secret. Due to a curse upon his progenitors, his entire family consists of werewolves, and hide their true nature while in public. Through the difficulties of adolescence, Scott confides in his closest friends and trusts that they will help him in the unexpected event that he begins to transform and "wolf out" in the presence of others.

=== Teen Wolf (2011–2017) ===
Developed as a reboot of the franchise, Teen Wolf was produced by MTV and debuted in 2011. Created, written, and helmed by Jeff Davis, the series plot centered around a high school student named Scott McCall who is lacking in status amongst his contemporaries. He lives in the fictional city of Beacon Hills in California with his mother, and seeks for ways to thrive amongst his class. One night his life is completely changed after receiving a bite from an alpha werewolf. Gaining superhuman abilities and supernatural gifts, McCall starts to gain the attention he always wanted of those around him including his love interest named Allison Argent. Unfortunately for him, she is the daughter in a family of werewolf hunters. With the help of his best friend Stiles, Scott uses his wolf-form to protect his hometown from the evil creatures and entities that are drawn to it. As they combat the hoard of spooky assailants, they form a group of friends to aid them in defending their city; including a banshee named Lydia, a natural born werewolf named Derek, a werecoyote named Malia, a kitsune named Kira, and a younger werewolf named Liam. All the while Scott fights to protect his family, his friends, and the citizens of his town.

== Digital series ==
| Series | Season(s) | Episode(s) | Originally released | | | Showrunner | Executive producer |
| Series | Season(s) | Episode(s) | First released | Last released | Network | Showrunner | Executive producer |
|---|---|---|---|---|---|---|---|
| Teen Wolf: Search for a Cure | 1 | 6 | June 29, 2011 | July 25, 2011 | AT&T, MTV.com | Jeff Davis | |

A short-form digital series titled, Teen Wolf: Search for a Cure was released in 2011. The series was written and helmed by Jeff Davis, and stars Tyler Posey and Dylan O'Brien reprising their respective roles from the Teen Wolf series. The plot runs simultaneously with the first season of the television series, and centers around best friends Scott McCall and Stiles Stilinski, and their search for a cure to the curse of the werewolf bite that has changed McCall. The search brings the pair in contact with Dr. Conrad Fenris. The digi-series was a joint-venture production between MEC Entertainment, Generate Studios, AT&T, and MTV; while distribution was handled in collaboration by AT&T's social media page, as well as MTV's official website.

== Comic books ==
In September 2011, Top Cow Productions announced its production of a three-issue miniseries of Teen Wolf comic books in conjunction with MTV Comics, based on the MTV show. The comic books were "written by David Tischman with art by Stephen Mooney and covers by Joe Corroney".

== Recurring cast and characters ==
List indicators

This section includes characters who will appear or have appeared in more than two films in the series.

- An empty grey cell indicates the character was not in the film, or that the character's official presence has not yet been confirmed.
- ^{V} indicates a voice-only role.
- ^{Y} indicates a younger version of the character.

| Character | Film | | | Television | | Digital |
| Character | Teen Wolf (1985) | Teen Wolf Too | Teen Wolf: The Movie | Teen Wolf: The Animated Series | Teen Wolf (2011–2017) | Teen Wolf: Search for a Cure |
|---|---|---|---|---|---|---|
| Scott Howard | Michael J. Fox | | | Townsend Coleman^{V} Di Rudder (Note: Rudder performed in the series as the Scott Howard body double during the live-action/animation hybrid opening sequence.) | | |
| Harold Howard | James Hampton | James Hampton | | James Hampton^{V} | | |
| Todd Howard | | Jason Bateman | | Christopher Barzman | | |
| Rupert "Stiles" Stilinski | Jerry Levine | Stuart Fratkin | | Donald Most^{V} | | |
| Chubby | Mark Holton | Mark Holton | | Mark Holton^{V} | | |
| Lisa "Boof" Marconi | Susan Ursitti | | | Jeannie Elias^{V} | | |
| Robert "Bobby" Finstock | Jay Tarses | Paul Sand | | | | |
| Pamela Wells | Lorie Griffin | | | Ellen Gerstell^{V} | | |
| Mick McAllister | Mark Arnold | | | Craig Sheffer^{V} | | |
| Scott McCall | | | Tyler Posey | | Tyler Posey | Tyler Posey |
| Allison Argent | | | Crystal Reed | | Crystal Reed | |
| Stiles Stilinski | | | Dylan O'Brien | | Dylan O'Brien | Dylan O'Brien |
| Derek Hale | | | Tyler Hoechlin | | Tyler Hoechlin | |
| Lydia Martin | | | Holland Roden | | Holland Roden | |
| Jackson Whittemore | | | Colton Haynes | | Colton Haynes | |
| Malia Tate | | | Shelley Hennig | | Shelley Hennig | |
| Liam Dunbar | | | Dylan Sprayberry | | Dylan Sprayberry | |
| Noah Stilinski | | | Linden Ashby | | Linden Ashby | |
| Melissa McCall | | | Melissa Ponzio | | Melissa Ponzio | |
| Chris Argent | | | JR Bourne | | JR Bourne | |

== Additional crew and production details ==
| Film / Television | Crew/Detail | | | | | |
| Film / Television | Composer(s) | Cinematographer(s) | Editor(s) | Production companies | Distributing company | Running time |
|---|---|---|---|---|---|---|
| Teen Wolf | Miles Goodman | Tim Suhrstedt | Lois Freeman-Fox | Atlantic Releasing Corporation, Wolfkill Productions | Atlantic Entertainment | 92 mins |
| Teen Wolf (The Animated Series) | Richard Kosinski, Wells Christie, James Donnellan, David Kitay, John Lewis Parker, and Sam Winans | Production manager: Wayne Dearing; Creative director: Chris Cuddington | Robert Ciaglia, Judith Burke, and Dennis Phillips | Southern Star Productions, Hanna-Barbera Australia, Clubhouse Pictures, Atlantic Entertainment Group, The Kushner-Locke Company | Columbia Broadcasting System, MGM Television | 10 hrs 30 mins (30 minute episodes) |
| Teen Wolf Too | Mark Goldenberg | Jules Brenner | Raja Gosnell, Steven Polivka, Harvey Rosenstock & Kim Secrist | Atlantic Entertainment Group | Atlantic Entertainment | 94 mins |
| Teen Wolf (TV series) | Dino Meneghin | Jonathan Hall, Rich Paisley, and David Daniel | Gabriel Flemming, Alyssa Clark, Gregory Cusumano, Edward R. Abroms, David Daniel, Kim Powell, and Kevin Mock | MGM Television, MTV Production Development, Adelstein Productions, DiGa Vision, First Cause Inc., Lost Marbles Television, Siesta Productions | MGM Domestic Television Distribution, MTV | 66 hrs 40 mins (40 minute episodes) |
| Teen Wolf: Search for a Cure | Dino Meneghin | Jeff Davis | Jeff Davis | AT&T, MTV Entertainment Studios, MEC Entertainment, Generate Studios | AT&T, MTV.com | 18 mins (3 minute episodes) |
| Teen Wolf: The Movie | Dino Meneghin | David Daniel | Edward R. Abroms & Gregory Cusumano | MTV Entertainment Studios, MGM Television, Orion Television, First Cause Inc., Capital Arts Entertainment, Paramount+ Original Films | Paramount+ | 2 hrs 20 mins |

== Reception ==
=== Box office and financial performance ===
| Film | Box office gross | | Box office ranking | | Video sales gross | Worldwide total gross income | Budget | Worldwide total net income | Ref. |
| Film | North America | Other territories | All time North America | All time worldwide | North America | Worldwide total gross income | Budget | Worldwide total net income | Ref. |
|---|---|---|---|---|---|---|---|---|---|
| Teen Wolf | $33,086,611 | —N/a | #2,685 | #3,947 | information not publicly available | >$33,086,611 | $4,000,000 | >$29,086,611 | |
| Teen Wolf Too | $7,888,703 | —N/a | #5,696 | #8,204 | $68,689 | $7,956,689 | $3,000,000 | $4,956,689 | |
| Teen Witch | $27,843 | —N/a | information not publicly available | information not publicly available | information not publicly available | >$27,843 | $2,500,000 | ≥-$2,472,157 | |
| Totals | $41,003,157 | —N/a | x̄ #2,794 | x̄ #4,050 | >$68,689 | >$41,071,143 | $9,500,000 | ≥$31,571,143 | |

=== Critical and public response ===
| Work | Rotten Tomatoes | Metacritic |
|---|---|---|
| Teen Wolf | 42% (33 reviews) | 25/100 (5 reviews) |
| Teen Wolf: The Animated Series | | —N/a |
| Teen Wolf Too | 8% (24 reviews) | 8/100 (5 reviews) |
| Teen Witch | 44% (9 reviews) | 46/100 (4 reviews) |
| Teen Wolf (2011 TV series) | 81% (88 reviews) | 63/100 (22 reviews) |
| Teen Wolf: The Movie | 32% (25 reviews) | 51/100 (7 reviews) |

== Cancelled and repurposed projects ==
=== Sequel ===
A third film, serving as a sequel to Teen Wolf and Teen Wolf Too, was originally in development with Alyssa Milano cast in the lead role, though it was never officially green-lit by the studio and never materialized.

=== Teen Witch ===
| Film | U.S. release date | Director | Screenwriters | Producers |
|---|---|---|---|---|
| Teen Witch | April 23, 1989 | Dorian Walker | Robin Menken & Vernon Zimmerman | Moshe Diamant, Rafael Eisenman, Alana H. Lambros, Bob Manning and Eduard Sarlai |

Originally intended to serve as a spin-off film directly connected to the original two Teen Wolf films, Teen Witch was repurposed to be a standalone story instead. Starring Robyn Lively, the plot, similar in structure to the Teen Wolf films, centers around an adolescent witch in comedic situations at high school. In addition, the film also incorporates the use of musical numbers. Though initially poorly received by critics, the film has since garnered a cult status following midnight theater screenings and its inclusion in ABC Family / Freeform annual 31 Nights of Halloween event.

==== Adaptations ====
In 2007, it was discovered that master audio tapes of the original soundtrack to Teen Witch had been misplaced. Due to the high demand from the film's growing fanbase for a soundtrack album, Larry and Tom Weir were commissioned by Caption Records to develop new recordings with an all-new cast. Alana Lambros produced the recording with intentions to expand the project into a Broadway stage musical titled Teen Witch: The Musical. The show and its songs were performed at radio station events, parks, and county fairs that summer; despite intentions for a wide release, the stage production never received a large venue debut.

In April 2008, it was announced that United Artists was developing a remake film adaptation. Ashley Tisdale was cast in the leading role as Louise Miller, a successful student lacking in social status who discovers she is the descendant of witches and has mystical abilities. A script was in development at that time.
