= Teen Wolf (disambiguation) =

Teen Wolf is a 1985 American comedy film.

Teen Wolf may also refer to:

- Teen Wolf (1986 TV series), an animated series based on the film
- Teen Wolf Too (1987), a sequel to the 1985 film
- Teen Wolf (2011 TV series), a live-action supernatural drama series based on the film
- Teen Wolf: The Movie, a film sequel to the 2011 TV series
