= Miracle in the Wilderness =

- Based on: Miracle in the Wilderness by Paul Gallico
- Screenplay by: Michael Michaelian; Jim Byrnes
- Directed by: Kevin James Dobson
- Starring: Kris Kristofferson; Kim Cattrall; John Dennis Johnston; Rino Thunder; David Oliver; Sheldon Peters Wolfchild
- Composer: Vladimir Horunzhy
- Country of origin: United States
- Original language: English

Production
- Producer: Wayne Morris
- Cinematography: Dan Burstall
- Editor: Susan B. Browdy
- Running time: 88 minutes
- Production companies: Turner Pictures; Ruddy & Morgan Productions

Original release
- Network: TNT
- Release: December 9, 1991

Miracle in the Wilderness is a 1991 American adventure film directed by Kevin James Dobson and written by Michael Michaelian and Jim Byrnes. The film stars Kris Kristofferson, Kim Cattrall, John Dennis Johnston, Rino Thunder, David Oliver and Sheldon Peters Wolfchild. The film premiered on TNT on December 9, 1991.

== Plot ==
Based on 1975 short story Miracle in the Wilderness, a Christmas Story of Colonial America by Paul Gallico. Gallico's original story was set in pre-Revolutionary Colonial America, whereas this 1991 TV movie is set in the mid-1800s on the Western Plains/Rocky Mountain Frontier. A recently reformed, but violent and rough mountain man, Jericho Adams, along with his devout Christian wife Dora and their infant boy child, are preparing to celebrate a humble frontier Christmas. Adams and his family are unexpectedly attacked and captured, their cabin burned by Chief Many Horses, and his Blackfoot band, who are seeking revenge and restitution for Jericho previously killing the chief's young adult warrior son. The Chief's intention is to forcibly take and raise the Adams baby as his own, in lieu of the older son, killed by Jericho. Because of this history, the life or death fate of Jericho and Dora also hang in the balance. After coming upon a miracle of a fearlessly tranquil family of deer, which the Indians view as "strong medicine," and it being Christmas Eve, Dora and Jericho relate a loosely adapted story of the Nativity of Jesus to the Blackfoot band, but employ plains Indian cultural motifs and characters. For instance, the Three Wise-Men are described as medicine men chiefs from various tribes to the east; "One was a Teton. And second was Mandan and the third was Plains Cree". Although at first skeptical, in the end, Chief Many Horses is so moved and impressed with the Christmas Story, he relents in his original plans for revenge and restitution.

== Cast ==
- Kris Kristofferson as Jericho Adams
- Kim Cattrall as Dora Adams
- John Dennis Johnston as Sergeant Sam Webster
- Rino Thunder as Chief Washakie
- David Oliver as Lieutenant Reid
- Sheldon Peters Wolfchild as Many Horses
- Steve Reevis as Grey Eyes
- Peter Alan Morris as Asher Adams
- Joanelle Romero as Little Deer
- Otakuye Conroy as Mary
- Matthew E. Montoya as Joseph
- David Bull Plume as Impatient Brave
- Volley Reed as Captured Warrior
- Johnny Looking Cloud as Chief #1
- Patrick N. Augare as Blackfeet Brave
- Robbie Dunn as Shoshone Scout #1
- Terry Fredericks as Shoshone Scout #2
- Loren Cuny as Shoshone Scout #3
