= We're Dancin' =

US television program

We're Dancin' is an American music television program that aired on MTV for one season, from 1982–1983. It featured performances by various new wave music acts. Townsend Coleman was the show's host.

== Acts that appeared on We're Dancin' ==
- Bow Wow Wow
- The Waitresses
- Wang Chung
- Culture Club
- Marshall Crenshaw
- Billy Idol
