= Strange World (TV series) =

American sci-fi crime drama television series

- Intertitle
- Created by: Howard Gordon; Tim Kring
- Starring: Tim Guinee; Kristin Lehman; Saundra Quarterman
- Composer: Michael Hoenig
- Country of origin: United States
- Original language: English
- No. of seasons: 1
- No. of episodes: 13 (10 unaired)

Production
- Executive producer: Howard Gordon
- Running time: 43-44 minutes
- Production companies: Teakwood Lane Productions; 20th Century Fox Television

Original release
- Network: ABC (1999); Sci-Fi (2002)
- Release: March 8 – March 16, 1999

Strange World is an American science fiction crime drama television series created by Howard Gordon and Tim Kring for ABC. 13 episodes were commissioned, of which three aired on ABC in March 1999 before the network cancelled the program. The remaining ten episodes produced subsequently premiered on Sci-Fi in Spring 2002.

In a web chat during the 2002 run on Sci-Fi, Gordon stated that, since the producers felt ABC was not going to support the show, they had the opportunity to write a conclusion to the story.

== Plot ==
USAMRIID was created in 1970 to counter the threat of chemical and biological weapons.

Section 44 of the charter permits it to investigate criminal abuses of science.

—Text at the beginning of the pilot episode.

Captain Paul Turner (Tim Guinee) is a doctor for The United States Army Medical Research Institute for Infectious Diseases (USAMRIID), who suffers from a rare form of aplastic anemia as a result of exposure to chemical weapons during the Persian Gulf War. USAMRIID lures him out of his sickbed with the opportunity to bring justice to others suffering from unethical uses of science and technology. Unknown to his superiors, he is given a temporary cure for the symptoms of his disease by a mysterious woman who is an agent of a shadowy organization that may be trying to thwart the goals of USAMRIID. He requires periodic doses of the cure to remain functional, a weakness that the shadowy organization occasionally uses to control him. Both the machinations of the "shadowy organization" and Turner's dependency on the "cure" are ultimately resolved in the final episode of the series.

== Cast ==
- Tim Guinee as Captain Paul Turner
- Kristin Lehman as Dr. Sidney MacMillan
- Saundra Quarterman as Major Lynne Reese

== Title sequence ==
The opening-title sequence was added to the permanent collection of the American Institute of Graphic Arts in 1999. It was created by Imaginary Forces.

== Episodes ==
No.	Title	Directed by	Written by	Original release date	Prod. code
1	"Pilot"	Mick Jackson	Howard Gordon & Tim Kring	March 8, 1999	1ACG79
Turner is summoned to investigate the disappearance of a small child. Guest starring Arnold Vosloo.
2	"Lullaby"	Joseph Scanlan	Tim Minear	March 9, 1999	1ACG03
Turner discovers that the Japanese Woman's superiors are using a pregnant girl (Monet Mazur), in Sydney's care, as a pawn in a bizarre case of surrogacy.
3	"Azrael's Breed"	Vern Gillum	Manny Coto	March 16, 1999	1ACG08
Turner assists the Baltimore PD in tracking down a couple (Robert Knepper, Missy Crider) who get their thrills from brain tissue stolen from corpses.
4	"Spirit Falls"	Peter Markle	Story by : Todd Ellis Kessler; Teleplay by : Todd Ellis Kessler & Tim Minear	March 1, 2002 (Sci-Fi)	1ACG05
Turner uncovers a secret hidden behind the mass suicide of a reclusive community -- and tests the loyalty of the Japanese Woman at the same time.
5	"The Devil Still Holds My Hand"	Tucker Gates	John Chambers	March 8, 2002 (Sci-Fi)	1ACG06
Turner's investigation of a possible viral outbreak leads him to a reunion with a former mentor whose antagonism of the Army matches Turner's own.
6	"Skin"	Brett Dowler	Jessica Scott & Mike Wollaeger	March 15, 2002 (Sci-Fi)	1ACG07
When Sydney is blamed for the death of a patient, she takes it upon herself to discover the real cause of his death and winds up stumbling onto a secret experiment instead.
7	"Man Plus"	Peter Markle	Howard Gordon & Thania St. John	March 22, 2002 (Sci-Fi)	1ACG02
Reese assigns Turner his first case when a prominent pianist's death is linked to a mysterious implant in his brain.
8	"Rage"	James Whitmore Jr.	Manny Coto	March 29, 2002 (Sci-Fi)	1ACG01
A series of unmotivated road rage incidents convinces Turner that some external force is causing the seemingly irrational violence.
9	"Aerobe"	Dan Lerner	Story by : Manny Coto; Teleplay by : Hans Tobeason & Manny Coto	April 12, 2002 (Sci-Fi)	1ACG04
When a Gulf War vet asks Turner's help in clearing his name, Turner flexes USAMRIID's muscle to stop an insidious cover-up at a nuclear plant.
10	"Eliza"	Vern Gillum	Tim Minear	April 19, 2002 (Sci-Fi)	1ACG10
A series of apparent I-War attacks hit Washington, D.C., prompting Turner to join a Department of Defense team in tracking down the source of the attacks.
11	"Down Came the Rain"	Ian Toynton	Manny Coto & Jose Molina	April 26, 2002 (Sci-Fi)	1ACG11
An ancient Native American ritual, a rare blood disease and an undiscovered species all come into play when Turner investigates a series of deaths in a Seattle high rise.
12	"Food"	Tucker Gates	Story by : John Chambers & Thania St. John; Teleplay by : John Chambers	May 3, 2002 (Sci-Fi)	1ACG09
Turner's vacation turns into work when a man's death is linked to his genetically engineered crop.
13	"Age of Reason"	Dwight Little	Howard Gordon & Tim Minear	May 10, 2002 (Sci-Fi)	1ACG12
The mysterious Japanese Woman calls on Turner one more time to investigate the abduction, six years ago, of a "wunderkind" named Adam Wasserman.

== See also ==
- Doomwatch
- Fringe
