= Teen Wolf =

1985 film by Rod Daniel

- Theatrical release poster
- Directed by: Rod Daniel
- Written by: Jeph Loeb (Note: Credited as "Joseph Loeb III."); Matthew Weisman
- Produced by: Thomas Coleman; Mark Levinson; George W. Perkins; Michael Rosenblatt; Scott M. Rosenfelt
- Starring: Michael J. Fox; James Hampton; Scott Paulin; Susan Ursitti; Jerry Levine; Jay Tarses
- Cinematography: Tim Suhrstedt
- Edited by: Lois Freeman-Fox
- Music by: Miles Goodman
- Production companies: Atlantic Releasing Corporation; Wolfkill Productions
- Distributed by: Atlantic Releasing Corporation
- Release date: August 23, 1985
- Running time: 92 minutes
- Country: United States
- Language: English
- Budget: $4 million
- Box office: $80 million

Teen Wolf is a 1985 American coming-of-age comedy film directed by Rod Daniel and written by Jeph Loeb and Matthew Weisman. Michael J. Fox stars as the title character, a high school student whose ordinary life is changed when he discovers that he is a werewolf. James Hampton, Scott Paulin, Susan Ursitti, Jerry Levine, Matt Adler, and Jay Tarses appear in supporting roles. Filming took place from November to December 1984.

Teen Wolf was released on August 23, 1985, by Atlantic Releasing Corporation, and received mixed reviews from film critics. It was a commercial success, grossing over $33 million domestically on a $4 million budget, with the worldwide gross being over $80 million. The film's success spawned a titular franchise, including an animated series adaptation in 1986, a sequel film in 1987, the supernatural live action drama series that aired on MTV from 2011 to 2017, and its continuation film in 2023.

== Plot ==
Scott Howard, a 17-year-old high school student, lives in Beacontown, Nebraska. His only claim to popularity is playing for the Beavers, his school's unsuccessful basketball team. Scott fawns after Pamela Wells even though she is dating his rival Mick, who plays for the Dragons, a dominant opposing team that bullies him on the court. He is also oblivious to the fact his longtime friend Boof has a crush on him.

Scott experiences strange physical changes, such as growing heavy body hair. He continues quitting the team, but the coach convinces him to stay. After Scott scores a keg of beer, he goes to a party with friends Stiles and Lewis. Scott and Boof end up alone in a closet as the result of a game. When they begin kissing, Scott accidentally claws Boof’s back unexpectly hard and she objects. When he returns home, he transforms into a werewolf. His father Harold explains how he is also a werewolf as the result of a family curse, and he had hoped Scott would not inherit it.

Scott reveals his secret to Stiles, who agrees to keep quiet. But when Scott becomes stressed on the basketball court, he becomes the Wolf and uses his newfound agility and strength to help the team win their first game in three years. Scott gains popularity as the high school is overwhelmed with 'Wolf Fever'. He is also alienated from Boof and his friend Lewis, who is scared of him. The basketball team goes on a winning streak, but his teammates resent him as he hogs the ball during games.

Stiles merchandises "Teen Wolf" paraphernalia, and Pamela finally begins paying attention to Scott. After he gets a role as a "werewolf cavalryman" in a Civil War school play alongside her, they have sex in the dressing room. Later, after a date set up to make Mick jealous, Pamela tells Scott how she is not interested in him as a boyfriend. Harold tells Scott he is responsible for his son's conflicts with vice principal Rusty Thorne, explaining that when they were in high school, Harold scared him in an attempt to protect Scott’s mother. He advises Scott to be himself and avoid abusing his wolf powers.

Boof agrees to go with Scott to the Spring Dance but only if he goes as himself. Scott goes alone as the Wolf instead. Boof takes him into the hallway and they kiss, which turns Scott back into himself. When they return to the dance, Scott garners everyone's attention, including Pamela. A jealous Mick punches him in the face, then insults Boof and taunts Scott until the Wolf angrily attacks. Horrified by his loss of control, Scott flees but encounters Thorne in the hall. Thorne attempts to expel Scott, but Harold sends his son home before intimidating Thorne by growling in his face, causing the vice principal to wet himself.

Scott renounces using the Wolf. During the championship game, he arrives to rally his teammates. Despite the odds, the team works together and makes ground against the Dragons. During the final quarter, behind by one point, Scott is fouled hard by Mick at the buzzer. He makes both free throws, winning the championship. Brushing past Pamela, he kisses Boof as his father embraces them both. Mick tells Pamela that they should leave, but she tells him to "drop dead" and storms off while everyone else celebrates the victory.

== Cast ==
- Michael J. Fox as Scott Howard
- James Hampton as Harold Howard
- Susan Ursitti as Lisa "Boof" Marconi
- Jerry Levine as Rupert "Stiles" Stilinski
- Matt Adler as Lewis
- Lorie Griffin as Pamela Wells
- Jim McKrell as Rusty Thorne
- Mark Arnold as Mick McAllister
- Jay Tarses as Coach Bobby Finstock
- Mark Holton as Chubby
- Scott Paulin as Kirk Lolley
- Doug Savant as Brad

== Production ==
Teen Wolf was one of the first scripts written by Jeph Loeb. Loeb was hired to write it because the studio, after the surprising success of the film Valley Girl, wanted to make a comedy that would cost almost nothing and take very little time to film. The project came together when Michael J. Fox accepted the lead role and his Family Ties co-star Meredith Baxter-Birney became pregnant, which created a delay in the sitcom's filming that allowed Fox time to complete filming and then return to his sitcom.

On a production budget of $4 million, principal photography for Teen Wolf began in November 1984 and concluded the next month. James Hampton originally auditioned for the role of Coach Bobby Finstock but was later cast as Harold Howard. The beaver mascot logo used in the film was the Oregon State University Beavers logo, in use by the university at that time.

== Release ==
Atlantic Releasing spent $4 million on advertising for Teen Wolf. Atlantic initially scheduled Teen Wolf to release earlier in 1985, but delayed it to let the bigger films ride. Released in the U.S. on August 23, 1985, Teen Wolf debuted at No. 2 in its opening weekend, behind Back to the Future (also starring Michael J. Fox). After its initial run, the film grossed $33,086,661 domestically, with a worldwide gross of about $80 million. According to one of the film's producers, the success of the film caught the film industry by surprise.

Teen Wolf was first released on DVD via MGM in a "Double Feature" pack with its sequel Teen Wolf Too on August 27, 2002. The film was later released on Blu-ray on March 29, 2011. The only special feature available on any of the releases is the film's theatrical trailer. The film was reissued on Blu-ray Disc on August 8, 2017, by Scream! Factory, with a remastered transfer and a new "making of" featurette.

== Reception ==
The film's critical reception was mixed. Review aggregator Rotten Tomatoes reports that 46% of 35 critics have given the film a positive review, with a rating average of 5.2 out of 10. The consensus summarizes: "Though Michael J. Fox is as charismatic as ever, Teen Wolf's coming-of-age themes can't help but feel a little stale and formulaic." On Metacritic, the film has a 25 out of 100 rating based on 5 critics, indicating "generally unfavorable reviews".

=== Critical response ===
Vincent Canby of The New York Times gave the film a negative review calling it "aggressively boring". He went on to say that "the film is overacted by everybody except Mr. Fox, who is seen to far better advantage in Back to the Future."

Colin Greenland reviewed Teen Wolf for White Dwarf #75, and stated that "Anxious that their movie should be perfectly wholesome, clean and bloodless, writers and director forgot Scott was supposed to be a werewolf, and made him a basketball star instead."

== Soundtrack ==
All lyrics are written by Douglas Brayfield; all music is composed by Miles Goodman.

Teen Wolf: Original Motion Picture Soundtrack
No.	Title	Contributing artists	Length
1.	"Flesh on Fire"	James House	4:05
2.	"Big Bad Wolf"	The Wolf Sisters	2:36
3.	"Win in the End"	Mark Safan	4:41
4.	"Shootin' for the Moon"	Amy Holland	2:45
5.	"Silhouette"	David Palmer	3:54
6.	"Way to Go"	Mark Vieha	3:45
7.	"Good News"	David Morgan	2:56
8.	"Transformation (Instrumental)"	Miles Goodman	2:29
9.	"Boof (Instrumental)"	Miles Goodman	1:54
Total length:			29:05

== Legacy ==
=== Animated television series ===
An animated series adaptation aired on CBS for two seasons from 1986 to 1987. Townsend Coleman voiced the lead role of Scott Howard, with James Hampton reprising his role as Harold Howard. The series retained the basic premise and most of the characters from the film, but made changes to the story, such as Scott attempting to keep his werewolf identity secret from the general public. It also featured new characters, including Scott's grandparents (voiced by Stacy Keach Sr. and June Foray) and younger sister Lupe.

=== Sequels ===
A sequel entitled Teen Wolf Too was released in 1987 and starred Jason Bateman as Todd Howard, Scott Howard's cousin. Only James Hampton and Mark Holton returned from the original film, with the sequel focusing mostly on new characters led by Todd. Teen Wolf Too received negative reviews and failed to match the success of its predecessor, grossing $7.9 million on a $3 million budget. A second sequel starring Alyssa Milano was planned, but never filmed. Another female version of Teen Wolf was in the works that later developed into 1989's Teen Witch.

=== Live-action television series ===
MTV greenlit a television series adaptation in 2009 that was developed by Jeff Davis. While also centered on a high school student who becomes a werewolf, the story was reimagined as a supernatural teen drama with elements of action and horror. Tyler Posey portrayed the title character, whose name was changed to Scott McCall for the series. It aired for six seasons from 2011 to 2017. A film continuation, Teen Wolf: The Movie, was released on January 26, 2023.

== See also ==
- List of basketball films
- I Was a Teenage Werewolf (1957), an earlier horror film about a high school teenage werewolf
- Full Moon High (1981), an earlier comedy-horror film about a high school teenage werewolf
- Big Wolf on Campus (1999), a Canadian TV series on Fox Family, produced by Saban Entertainment about a high-school senior boy who becomes a werewolf
- Ginger Snaps (2000), teenage girl werewolf black comedy
