= Teen Wolf (1986 TV series) =

American animated television series

- Also known as: The Cartoon Adventures of Teen Wolf
- Genre: Adventure; Comedy
- Based on: Teen Wolf by: Jeph Loeb; Matthew Weisman
- Written by: Buzz Dixon
- Directed by: Gordon Kent
- Creative director: Chris Cuddington
- Voices of: Townsend Coleman; James Hampton; Don Most; June Foray; Stacy Keach Sr.
- Theme music composer: Opening theme: John Lewis Parker; Barry Mann; Closing theme: Ashley Hall; Stephanie Tyrell
- Countries of origin: United States; Australia
- Original language: English
- No. of seasons: 2
- No. of episodes: 21

Production
- Executive producers: Jonathan Dana; Buzz Potamkin
- Producer: Gordon Kent
- Running time: 30 minutes
- Production companies: Southern Star/Hanna-Barbera Australia; Clubhouse Pictures (season 1); Atlantic/Kushner-Locke (season 2)

Original release
- Network: CBS
- Release: 13 September 1986 – 7 November 1987

Related
- Teen Wolf; Teen Wolf (2011 TV series); Teen Wolf Too

Teen Wolf, known as The Cartoon Adventures of Teen Wolf in the United Kingdom, is an animated television series broadcast from 1986 to 1987, that was produced by Southern Star/Hanna-Barbera Australia in association with Clubhouse Pictures in the first season and Atlantic/Kushner-Locke in the second season. It was based on the live action film Teen Wolf (1985), and the second installment overall in the titular franchise.

== Summary ==
The series is about a teenage boy and his family who can transform into werewolves, focusing on themes of coming of age and fitting in. While generally keeping true to the main ideas, this version made some changes from the film.

Scott Howard and his family now live in the fictional town of Wolverton, a small town constantly drawing tourists because of its history of werewolf sightings. (In the film the town was called 'Beacontown'.) Scott was an only child who lived with his father in the film, the cartoon gave him a little sister and grandparents.

Although he never hurt anybody while he was a werewolf, Scott was conscious of his difference from other teenagers and had to make accommodations for himself. He also expressed frustration that the residents of this town had stereotyped "his people". Boof's father Mayor Marconi is a semi-antagonist to the Howard family in the cartoon and is unaware his daughter is in love with a werewolf. But he never appears in the earlier live-action film.

A jock named Mick who now also attends Wolverton High constantly picks on Scott for being the "outsider". Mick attended a different high school in the film. Pamela is a cheerleader in the cartoon while in the film she really did not show much school spirt.

== Characters ==
From left to right: Boof, Scott, Harold (above), Lupe (below) and Grandpa Howard.

- Scott Howard (voiced by Townsend Coleman), the main protagonist; he constantly chases local cheerleader and popular girl Pam, while being thwarted by Pam's boyfriend Mick McAllister, a mean jock. Scott spends much of his time worrying about social acceptance and the possibility of people finding out he's a werewolf. Unlike the movie, Scott is not on a sports team but still wears a letterman jacket.
- Harold Howard (voiced by James Hampton, the only actor that reprised his role from the live-action film), Scott's widower father; a laid-back hardware store owner, generally uninterested in the social problems of his son. He seldom transforms.
- Lupe Howard (voiced by Jeannie Elias), Scott's younger sister is one of the new characters added for the animated series. She is not old enough to know whether she is a werewolf or not, but she desperately wants to be one. In one episode, she is able to transform because of a magic spell, but since the spell turns anyone into a werewolf temporarily, she still does not know her true status.
- Grandpa Howard (voiced by Stacy Keach Sr.), Scott's grandfather is an immigrant from Transylvania. He spends most of his time in his werewolf form, only assuming a completely human appearance when he must. He is a constant source of embarrassment to Scott, because he is always running around on all fours, chasing cats, and getting into trouble with the neighbors. He is another new character added for the cartoon.
- Grandma Howard (voiced by June Foray), Scott's grandmother; also from Transylvania and, like Grandpa, she stays in werewolf form most of the time. She is not as embarrassing to Scott because she is better behaved than Grandpa. She becomes Scott's ally in his attempts to keep Grandpa's behavior under control. She is sometimes represented as a fortune teller similar to a stereotypical Gypsy, and has sometimes performed other magic, such as brewing potions, making her seem similar to a witch in some ways. She is another new character added for the cartoon.
- Rupert "Stiles" Stilinski (voiced by Don Most), Scott's best friend; in on the werewolf secret, Stiles is supportive but often gets under-appreciated in Scott's quest to be "in" with the cool crowd. Like Lupe, he wishes to be a werewolf and is upset that Scott doesn't appreciate the "gift".
- Chubs (voiced by Will Ryan) Another friend of Scott's; who is in on the werewolf secret. Chubs is more trustworthy than Styles and says much less. Unlike the film version he is not on any sports team but still loves to eat.
- Lisa "Boof" Marconi (voiced by Jeannie Elias), a friend of Scott's, and is also in on his family's werewolf secret alongside Stiles. She is romantically interested in him, but he seems oblivious of this, chasing after Pam instead.
- Mayor Marconi (voiced by Frank Welker and Kenneth Mars) Boof's father and the Wolverton mayor, oblivious to the Howards, not a 'mean' person but occasionally gets tricked into supporting dangerous things which would hurt his constituents. He was added for the cartoon and had not appeared in the movie.
- Pamela Wells (voiced by Ellen Gerstell), the most popular girl in Wolverton High and serving as a cheerleader, she is Scott's romantic interest. She is the girlfriend of Mick McAllister, who sometimes thwarts Scott and picks on him for being an outsider. Pam is unaware that Scott is a werewolf like his family before him, like everybody in Wolverton who doesn't know the Howard family's secret.
- Mick McAllister (voiced by Craig Sheffer), a mean jock at Wolverton High, he is the boyfriend of Pamela Wells who thwarts Scott and picks on him for being an outsider in Wolverton. Mick, like Pam and everybody else in town, is unaware that Scott and his family are werewolves.
- Mrs. Seslick (voiced by June Foray), the Howard family's nosy neighbor who is always a step away from figuring out the family's secret and outing them to the community. She is the last new character added just for the cartoon.

== Cast ==
- Sheryl Bernstein as Frieda the Housekeeper
- Townsend Coleman as Scott Howard
- Brian Cummings
- Jeannie Elias as Lupe Howard, Lisa "Boof" Marconi
- June Foray as Grandma Howard, Mrs. Seslick
- Ellen Gerstell as Pamela Wells
- James Hampton as Harold Howard
- Stacy Keach, Sr. as Grandpa Howard
- Kenneth Mars as Mayor Marconi (first voice)
- Mona Marshall
- Don Most as Stiles
- Will Ryan as Chubs
- Craig Sheffer as Mick McAllister
- Frank Welker as Valor, Daisy, Mayor Marconi (second voice)

== History ==
Although the cartoon series ran for three years, the third year was entirely reruns.

== Episodes ==
=== Season 1 (1986) ===
| No. overall | No. in season | Title | Written by | Original release date | Prod. code |
|---|---|---|---|---|---|
| 1 | 1 | "Teen Wolf's Family Secret" | Rowby Goren | 13 September 1986 | 01 |
Scott must recover his werewolf family album before his family secret is revealed.
| 2 | 2 | "The Werewolf Buster" | Rowby Goren | 20 September 1986 | 02 |
A werewolf hunter comes to the town of Wolverton and Scott and his family must find and warn Grandpa who is hunting turkey in the woods before the werewolf hunter catches up.
| 3 | 3 | "Shopworn Wolf" | Linda Woolverton | 27 September 1986 | 03 |
Stiles turns the Howard Hardware Store into a club while Scott's father is out of town.
| 4 | 4 | "The Beast Within" | Michael Reaves | 4 October 1986 | 04 |
The Howard family starts acting crazy and more feral than usual among turning into werewolves, and the cause is eventually linked to Lupe's science project.
| 5 | 5 | "Up a Family Tree" | Gordon Kent | 11 October 1986 | 05 |
Scott's family reunion is happening and his cousin almost reveals the family secret.
| 6 | 6 | "Grampa's in the Doghouse" | Bruce Reid Schaefer | 18 October 1986 | 06 |
Grandpa Howard is accidentally picked up by the Wolverton Dog Catcher! This is a rare episode where Grandpa and Grandma Howard appear human for several scenes at a time. Usually they look down upon 'passing'.
| 7 | 7 | "Wolf Pride" | Pamela Hickey; Dennys McCoy | 25 October 1986 | 07 |
Scott is offended by a werewolf horror movie being produced right in Wolverton, and wants to try and change the plot so it's more true to real life.
| 8 | 8 | "Wolf of My Dreams" | Linda Woolverton | 1 November 1986 | 08 |
Scott and Stiles set out to Hollywood to meet Shayna the She-Wolf.
| 9 | 9 | "Leader of the Pack" | Michael Reaves | 8 November 1986 | 09 |
Stiles recommends the "Wolf pack" to be the entertainers for the Wolverton Festival. However, this bike gang brings big trouble and Scott must find a way to scare them out of town.
| 10 | 10 | "The Curse of the Red Paw" | Bruce Reid Schaefer | 15 November 1986 | 10 |
Scott and his family make a trip to Rottenberg, Transylvania to reconnect with their past. However, danger lurks when the townspeople seem very spooked by the castle the family inherited. After a series of frightening instances, the family realizes there is nothing to be frightened about.
| 11 | 11 | "The All-American Werewolf" | Linda Woolverton | 22 November 1986 | 11 |
After the Howards are selected to be the "All American Family" will their secret get out?
| 12 | 12 | "Under My Spell" | Rowby Goren | 29 November 1986 | 12 |
A new family moves in that turns everyone in Wolverton except the Howards into zombies.
| 13 | 13 | "Teen Wolf Punks Out" | Linda Woolverton | 6 December 1986 | 13 |
Stile's car breaks down and a group of punks offer to help.

=== Season 2 (1987) ===
| No. overall | No. in season | Title | Written by | Original release date | Prod. code |
|---|---|---|---|---|---|
| 14 | 1 | "Teen Wolf's Curse" | Rowby Goren | 19 September 1987 | 14 |
Grandma’s longtime foe Zazu casts a curse on the Howards that turns anybody they touch into werewolves.
| 15 | 2 | "It's No Picnic Being Teen Wolf" | Gordon Kent | 26 September 1987 | 15 |
Scott has to watch over Grandpa for the weekend while Grandma is out of town, but it's the same weekend as the school picnic. Grandpa tags along with Scott and his friends, leaving Scott embarrassed in spite of Grandpa being able to keep up with the other teens. During a three legged race, Scott wolfs out and flees, leaving it up to Grandpa to find him.
| 16 | 3 | "Toot Toot Tut Tut and All That Rot" | Linda Woolverton | 3 October 1987 | 16 |
The werewolf mascot costume is stolen by the uppity Upson High boys, right before the big game. Scott and Stiles must outsmart the snobbish Upson boys in order to retrieve the costume, or they'll have to find a new mascot entirely.
| 17 | 4 | "Down on the Farm" | Rowby Goren | 10 October 1987 | 17 |
Scott and his family must quickly figure out how to calm down the animals on a farm in order to effectively perform the daily chores.
| 18 | 5 | "Diary of a Mad Werewolf" | Linda Woolverton | 17 October 1987 | 18 |
The statue of the "Werewolf on Horseback" is stolen with the diary of Scott's great Uncle, one of the town founders, hidden in it.
| 19 | 6 | "Teen Wolf Come Home" | Linda Woolverton | 24 October 1987 | 19 |
Scott bumps his head and can't remember who is or that he is a werewolf.
| 20 | 7 | "Scott and the Howlers" | Rowby Goren | 31 October 1987 | 20 |
After Scott and his rock band perform a song on a televised talent show, Scott is discovered by a record label that wants to sign him. However, after realizing that the record label wants him to leave his friends behind, he must weigh the value of fame versus friends.
| 21 | 8 | "Howlin' Cousins" | Linda Woolverton | 7 November 1987 | 21 |
Scott visits his cousin, Todd, but the two have nothing in common. As Scott tries to help Todd come out of his shell, he realizes that he and his cousin are much more alike than he initially thought. NOTE: Todd Howard was a character in the live action movie Teen Wolf Too which had starred Jason Bateman. It is unknown if Todd was supposed to be added for a potential third season of this cartoon.

== Home media ==
=== Video releases ===
==== United Kingdom ====
| Release name | Release date | Classifaction | Publisher | Format | Language | Subtitles | Notes | REF |
|---|---|---|---|---|---|---|---|---|
| The Cartoon Adventures of Teen Wolf - Part One | Unknown | U | Entertainment in Video | PAL | English | None | | |
| The Cartoon Adventures of Teen Wolf - Part Two | Unknown | U | Entertainment in Video | PAL | English | None | | |
| The Cartoon Adventures of Teen Wolf - Part Three | Unknown | U | Entertainment in Video | PAL | English | None | | |
| Teen Wolf – Teen Wolf's Curse/ Howlin' Cousins | Unknown | PG | Video Gems | PAL | English | None | | |

==== United States ====
| Release name | Release date | Classifaction | Publisher | Format | Language | Subtitles | Notes | REF |
|---|---|---|---|---|---|---|---|---|
| Teen Wolf: All American Werewolf | 1 January 1998 | Unknown | Avid Home Entrainment | NTSC | English | None | containing two episodes | |
| Teen Wolf: Wolf of My Dreams | 14 September 1993 | Unknown | Family Home Entrainment | NTSC | English | None | containing four episodes | |

=== DVD releases ===
In 2017, Shout! Factory was set to release the entire Teen Wolf animated series on DVD-Video in Region 1 for the very first time in September of that year. However on June 29 2017, Shout! Factory announced via Twitter that the release was delayed pending the resolution of a previously unforeseen legal issue.

| Title | Episodes | Region 1 | Region 2 | Region 4 | Notes |
|---|---|---|---|---|---|
| Teen Wolf: The Complete Animated Series | 1–21 | Delayed indefinitely | – | 18 April 2008 | Three-disc box set |
