= Defense Play =

- Theatrical release poster
- Directed by: Monte Markham
- Written by: Stan Krantman (story); Wolf Schmidt (story)
- Screenplay by: Aubrey Solomon; Steve Greenberg
- Produced by: James Ruxin; Wolf Schmidt
- Starring: David Oliver; Susan Ursitti; Monte Markham; Eric Gilliom; Jamie McMurray; Jack Esformes; William Frankfather
- Cinematography: Timothy Galfas
- Edited by: James Ruxin
- Music by: Arthur B. Rubinstein
- Production company: Kodiak Films
- Distributed by: Trans World Entertainment
- Release date: September 9, 1988
- Running time: 88 minutes
- Country: United States
- Language: English

Defense Play is a 1988 American action-drama film directed by Monte Markham and starring David Oliver, Susan Ursitti, Monte Markham, Eric Gilliom, Jamie McMurray, Jack Esformes, and William Frankfather. The film was released by Trans World Entertainment on September 9, 1988.

== Plot ==
Professor Vandemeer works on a secret project for the US Air Force called DART: a very small helicopter for scouting and defense. When he gets killed, Colonel Denton comes under suspicion. His son Scott and Vandemeer's daughter Karen believe in his innocence and search for the true murderer and his motives.

== Cast ==
- David Oliver as Scott Denton
- Susan Ursitti as Karen Vandemeer
- Monte Markham as Mark Denton
- Eric Gilliom as Bill Starkey
- Jamie McMurray as Norm Beltzer
- Jack Esformes as Eddie Dietz
- William Frankfather as General Phillips
- Tom Rosqui as Chief Gill
- Milos Kirek as Anton
- Patch Mackenzie as Ann Denton
- Terence Cooper as Professor Vandemeer
- Susan Krebs as Margaret Fields
- Jonathon Wise as Nick
- Dah-ve Chodan as Audrey Denton
- Ron Recasner as Mike Agee
- J. Downing as Nicholai
- Allan Kolman as Russian Radioman
- Glenn Morshower as Bartender
- Rutanya Alda as Victoria Vandemeer
- Stacey Adams as Kelly
- Jim Beaver as FBI Man
- John Ingle as Senator
- Elliot Jonathan Klein as Air Force Colonel (uncredited)
- Tony Lima as (uncredited)
- Stephen Tako as Inspector (uncredited)
- Thadd Turner as Rancher (uncredited)
