= David Oliver (actor) =

American actor (1962–1992)

- Born: January 31, 1962; Concord, California, U.S.
- Died: November 12, 1992 (aged 30); Los Angeles, California, U.S.
- Resting place: Forest Lawn Memorial Park, Los Angeles, California, U.S.
- Years active: 1982–1992
- Partner: Terry Houlihan

David Oliver (January 31, 1962 – November 12, 1992) was an American stage, film and television actor.

== Career ==
Oliver was one of eight children born to Pat and William Oliver in Concord, California. He began his acting career in 1982. From 1983 to 1985, Oliver played the role of Perry Hutchins on the daytime soap opera Another World. In 1986, he starred as Chad Anderson in the soap Santa Barbara (1986). Also in 1986, he played the role of Sam Gardner in the acclaimed miniseries A Year in the Life. The miniseries then became a regular weekly series in the fall of 1987 on NBC for one season. Oliver's screen wife in both the miniseries and regular series was played by Sarah Jessica Parker. He also appeared in several stage roles including the San Diego Civic Light Opera's productions of The Unsinkable Molly Brown and Li'l Abner. Oliver was also one of the founding members of Young Artists United. Shortly before his death, he had a small role in an episode of Star Trek: The Next Generation and also in the play Elegies staged at the Canon Theater in Beverly Hills.

== Death ==
On November 12, 1992, Oliver died at his Los Angeles home of complications due to AIDS. His memorial service was held on November 18 at Forest Lawn Memorial Park in the Hollywood Hills.

== Filmography ==
Year	Title	Role	Notes
1982	Tucker's Witch		Episode: "Abra-Cadaver"
1983–1985	Another World	Perry Hutchins	Regular cast member
1985	Lady Blue	Josh Viland	Episode: "Beasts of Prey"
1986	Santa Barbara	Chad	2 episodes
1986	A Year in the Life	Sam Gardner	Miniseries
1986	Night of the Creeps	Steve	
1987–1988	A Year in the Life	Sam Gardner	22 episodes
1987	21 Jump Street	Kerry Graham	Episode: "My Future's So Bright, I Gotta Wear Shades"
1987	If It's Tuesday, This Must Be Belgium	David Swanson	Television movie
1988	Defense Play	Scott Denton	
1988	Deadly Intent	Gallery Extra	Direct-to-video release
1989	The Horror Show	Vinnie	
1989	Protect and Surf	Mike Deegan	Television movie
1990	Murder, She Wrote	Jeff Ogden	Episode: "Deadly Misunderstanding"
1991	Edward II	Thug	
1992	Star Trek: The Next Generation	Young Man	Episode: "Cost of Living"
1992	Shadowchaser	Murray	Direct-to-video release
1992	Miracle in the Wilderness	Lt. Reid	Television movie
