= List of Adventures in Odyssey characters =

The following is a partial list of characters from the radio program (and its animated TV adaptation) Adventures in Odyssey.

By Wooton Bassett

== Major characters (currently active) ==
- John Avery Whittaker, voiced by Hal Smith (1987–1994), Paul Herlinger (1996–2008), Andre Stojka (2009-2026), and Phil Crowley (since 2026), often known as "Whit", is the main fictional character of Adventures in Odyssey and the namesake of Odyssey's most famous attraction, Whit's End. He is viewed as an ethnically ambiguous spiritual Christian leader to the children, and adults also, in Odyssey. He was originally voiced by Hal Smith, but after Smith's death in 1994, the character of Whit left Odyssey to lead an archaeological mission in Israel for the Universal Press Foundation. Whit returned to Odyssey in 1996; he had been voiced by Paul Herlinger until 2008. Andre Stojka took the role following Herlinger's retirement. This is the second character voiced by Stojka that was previously voiced by Hal Smith (the first being Owl from Disney's Winnie the Pooh franchise, with Stojka having voiced the character from 1997 to 2006). Stojka continued voicing Whit until 2026, when the role was given to Phil Crowley.
- Connie Kendall, voiced by Katie Leigh (since 1987), is probably the second-most major character in Adventures in Odyssey, appearing in more episodes than any other character except John Avery Whittaker. Connie has been voiced by Katie Leigh since her arrival in Odyssey in episode #4: "Connie Comes to Town."
- Eugene Meltsner, voiced by Will Ryan (1987–2021), and Townsend Coleman (since 2021, with AI assistance), is a longtime employee at Whit's End. He is very intelligent, having a reputation for erudition and a fondness for trivia. Major plot arcs involving Eugene include his conversion to Christianity and his courtship, engagement, and then marriage to Katrina Shanks. Another major storyline about Eugene is the rediscovery of his father, whom he had believed dead since he was seven years old.
- Buck Oliver-Meltsner, voiced by Robby Bruce (since 2011), is a 16-year old who was once involved in a conspiracy to spread counterfeit money across America. He then served time in Juvenile Detention, after which he was released to Eugene and Katrina Meltsner as a foster child. He is not a Christian. Major story arcs include the counterfeit money conspiracy called the Green Ring Conspiracy, and Buck's quest to learn about his family (which were both wrapped up in the episode titled, "The Long End"). He also seems to have a relationship with Jules. He was adopted by Eugene and Katrina Meltsner in the episode titled, "As Buck Would Have It".
- Katrina Shanks-Meltsner, voiced by Pamela Hayden (1994–1998) and Audrey Wasilewski (since 2005), is the wife of Eugene Meltsner. She is the daughter of wealthy but emotionally distant father Armitage Shanks and mother Millie. She also has two brothers that have never been named.
- Jules Kendall, voiced by Shona Rodman (since 2013), is Connie's younger half-sister. Her name is short for July, since her father Bill has an odd fascination with marrying women with names of the months. She is used to her father's strange situations such as being unknown to her sister. Her first appearance was in "Life Expectancy, Part 2." In "The Ties That Bind," she was also the Perilous Pen's informant. She also sings with the Westcott girls. Jules recently became a Christian in "On the Edge, Part 2".
- Jason Whittaker voiced by Thom Pinto (1992) and Townsend Coleman (since 1994), is Whit's son and former National Security Agency agent. He ran Whit's End while Whit was in the Middle East. Jason came very close to marrying his longtime sweetheart, Tasha Forbes, but they broke up while parked in front of the Justice of the Peace's house. Jason currently runs the Triple J's Antiques shop.
- Wooton Bassett, voiced by Jess Harnell (since 2001), is an Odyssey mailman who is also the author of several comic series including Power Boy, Captain Absolutely, and Sleuth Family Robinson. In some ways, he seems to have not grown up yet (example: he collects Smiley Meal toys and has a slide going out of his house), although he occasionally shows his mature/serious side. He currently has a strained relationship with his father and his twin brother Wellington because Wooton is a Christian. At the end of Album 58, "The Ties That Bind," he proposed to his long-time girlfriend, Penny Wise, and got married in the album "Without a Hitch".
- Penny Bassett (since 2011), voiced by Kimmy Robertson, is very cheery. She is easily entertained by the small things in life, though she can become easily distracted. She is a Christian, but she can be swayed by false teachings if she doesn't know better. She is quite eccentric and a fairly abstract thinker, which helps her with one of her principle talents—art. Penny is also Connie's best friend and used to be her roommate. In the album "Without a Hitch," she married Wooton Bassett.
- Chris, voiced by Chris Anthony (since 1987), is the show's announcer and a resident of Odyssey.

== Major characters (currently inactive) ==
=== Adults ===
- Jack Allen (1994–2012), voiced by Alan Young, is a childhood friend of Whit, former manager of "Whit's End" when Whit was in the Middle East, and owner of the J & J Antique Gallery, along with his wife Joanne Allen. He last appeared in Album 50 in 2008, and a couple of Darien's Rise episodes in 2009. His final appearance was in Album 56 in 2012, with the announcement that he and Joanne would be traveling to Scotland in their retirement, and handing over management of the antiques shop to Jason Whittaker. Young died in 2016.
- Bart Rathbone, (1987-2008) voiced by Walker Edmiston and Robert Easton, is the schemish manager of the Electric Palace. Bart's character often attempts publicity stunts, such as a television game show, and ran as an unfocused, ill-informed candidate for mayor, against Tom Riley and later Margaret Faye. Both Edmiston and Easton have since died.
- Bernard Walton (1990–2008, 2015, 2023), voiced by Dave Madden is Odyssey's window-washer. Though kind-hearted, Bernard is somewhat cynical and grumpy, but is most widely known for his metaphorical humor and penchant for storytelling. He hosts B-TV, a Christian television show in Odyssey. He is also Eugene's distant relative. The character was retired from the show upon the retirement of Dave Madden, who has since died.
- Tom Riley (1987–2008), voiced by Walker Edmiston, is a local farmer and good friend of Whit. Edmiston died shortly before the recording of album 50, so Tom's character has recently been retired as well. Tom is said to be a longtime conservative member and chairman of the Odyssey City Council, as well as a one-term mayor of the town. An episode Album 62 in 2017 revealed that Riley had been dead "for years".
- George Barclay (1988–1997, 2003–2004), voiced by Chuck Bolte, A family man, George eventually left Odyssey with his wife and children for Pokenberry Falls to become pastor at local church (which served as the basis for a spoof of the film It's a Wonderful Life in album 31). He returned for several episodes in 2003 and 2004 to perform Connie and Mitch's wedding, which ultimately never happened. He also came by town for the unreleased 2009 episode/live event "BTV Live: God's Calling." (Barclay's name shares a pronunciation with that of Bishop George Berkeley, the 18th century philosopher after whom the University of California, Berkeley is named.) Each member of the Barclay family was named after characters and actors from It's a Wonderful Life.
- Mary Barclay (1989–1997), voiced by Patricia Parris and Carol Bilger. Mary is the wife of Pastor George Barclay and mother of three children, Donna, Jimmy, and Stewart Barclay.
- Dr. Regis Blackgaard (1989, 1991, 1994, 1995, 1999, 2000), voiced by Earl Boen is Whit's nemesis. Dr. Blackgaard was supposedly killed in an explosion of his own making in 1995. However, he left behind a virus in the Imagination Station that was destroyed a few years later after attempting to gain a corporeal form from Aubrey Shepard. Some of Dr. Blackgaard's biggest fans refuse to admit he was killed in the explosion, saying he's still alive but biding his time before returning to Odyssey again, if he ever does.
- Robert "Mitch" Mitchell (2001–2003, 2012), voiced by Steve Burns is Connie's boyfriend and an FBI agent also known as AREM (phonetical spelling of RM, his initials). Mitch's relationship with Connie was a turbulent one, plagued by misunderstandings and Connie's reluctance to trust him because of the secrecy of his work. Mitch was placed in witness protection during the Novacom Saga and was presumed dead until Connie discovered the truth. After the Novacom Saga, he proposed to Connie, but the two decided to call off the wedding at the last minute and temporarily separate. He briefly returned to Odyssey in album 55 in an FBI investigation, with his partner Maureen, who was his new fiancé.
- Dale Jacobs (1989–1998, 2012–2014), voiced by Phil Lollar, is the editor of The Odyssey Times. He had two daughters, Robyn and Melanie; Robyn (1989–92) was one of the more popular kid characters during her time on the show.
- Richard Maxwell (1989–2000), voiced by Nathan Carlson, debuted in the episode "An Encounter with Mrs. Hooper", and returned as a manipulative bully who worked as a counselor at Campbell County Community College and victimized his youthful charge, Nicholas Adamsworth in the episode "Eugene's Dilemma". After the truth about Richard's actions was revealed and he was dismissed from the college, Richard entered the employment of Dr. Regis Blackgaard, but had a change of heart after one of Blackgaard's schemes landed Lucy Cunningham-Schultz in the hospital. Having burned down Tom Riley's barn (for which Tom refused to forgive him for years afterward) and hacked into John Avery Whittaker's computer on Blackgaard's orders, Richard served two years in the Campbell County Detention Center before being released on parole. He foiled a number of Blackgaard's plans as part of his quest for personal redemption.
- Peter Bourland (2002–2003), voiced by Keith Silverstein, was an FBI Agent who helped investigate the Novacom case.
- Arthur Dent (2000–2002), named after the character from The Hitchhiker's Guide to the Galaxy and voiced by Christopher Snell, was an employee of Andromeda. Arthur Dent was driven to temporary paranoia by the realization of the corporation's goals and apparent power. He later destroyed a radio tower with fertilizer explosives, thinking that it was the tower from which Andromeda would be broadcasting its mind-control signals. After a court trial, he did not make any further appearances in Odyssey.
- Armitage Shanks, voiced by Bernard Erhard (1995–1998) and Brian Cummings (2002), was the father of Katrina Shanks; now deceased (allegedly murdered by poisoning during the Novacom saga). He was a bit overprotective of his daughter, and was frequently at odds with Eugene during the early stages of Eugene and Katrina's relationship; however, he was motivated more by love of his daughter than by malice toward Eugene.
- David Parker, voiced by Marc Evan Jackson (2010–2017), and Eddie Frierson (since 2018), is the father of the Parker family. He has three kids (Olivia, Matthew, and Camilla), and is married to his Latina wife, Eva. His mother-in-law is Lucia, and his sister-in-law is named Rosalita. David is also an architect.
- Eva Parker (since 2010), voiced by Amanda Troop, is the wife to David Parker and mother of Olivia, Matthew, and Camilla. She is a sensible mother who works part-time as a nurse at a local clinic. She has to find the right balance between raising her family and dealing graciously with her mother, who wants to make sure their Latin heritage doesn’t get lost.

=== Children ===
- Dylan Taylor (1990s), voiced by Aeryk Egan (later Victor DiMattia and Kyle Gibson), the son of the Taylor couple, brother of Jessie, did not appear in the radio series.
- Holly Ferguson (1990s), voiced by Erica Horn, a faithful redhead who never appeared in the radio series.
- Sal Martinez (1990s), voiced by Shaun Fleming (later Shane Sweet and Chris Miranda), Latino friend of Dylan, did not appear in the radio series.
- Rodney Rathbone (1989–2007), voiced by Steven Burns, the son of Bart Rathbone, is a mischievous local bully and head of The Bones of Rath, a gang of teenagers who cause mischief. Since the character of Bart was retired with the death of Walker Edmiston, Rodney is no longer a resident of Odyssey as well.
- Aubrey Shepard, voiced by Camilla Belle (1998-1999) and Danielle Judovits (1999-2005), was a creative and introspective girl who liked books and poetry. She has a tendency to act impetuously, which often gets her into trouble. Aubrey lived in Tom Riley's Timothy Center with her father Ben, mother Ellen, and younger sister Bethany. She was initially unhappy about her parents' newfound Christianity and often made a point to rebel against it, but became a Christian herself during the Novacom saga. She later left for college.
- Sam Johnson (1991–1996), voiced by Kyle Ellison, was a good-hearted boy who also tended to be somewhat naive and gullible.
- Lawrence Hodges (1992–1995, 2008), voiced by Gabriel Encarnacion, is a hyper-active kid with a run-away imagination to the point where he was having trouble separating his make-believe world and the real world, He was briefly heard over a phone-interview in the two part 2008 episode "The Triangled Web" (He is working at a laundromat as he has been kicked out of NASA.)
- Lucy Cunningham-Schultz (1988–1996, 2008), voiced by Genni Long, was a pre-teenaged reporter for both her middle school's newspaper The Odyssey Owl and The Odyssey Times. She reappeared as a college student in "The Triangled Web" and married Jack Davis.
- Donna Barclay (1988–1997), voiced by Azure Janosky. Daughter of George and Mary, older sister of Jimmy; often portrayed as a typical teenage girl who liked boys and shopping. Donna had a rebellious streak and could be somewhat temperamental also, but had a good heart and moral compass. Her best friend was Dale Jacobs' eldest daughter, Robyn Jacobs (voiced by Sage Bolte, 1989-1992), who was herself the central character in many episodes.
- James (Jimmy) Barclay (1988–1997, 2004, 2008), voiced by David Griffin. Probably the most popular child character in the show's history. He and his family were in numerous episodes. He was the only child star kept after the death of the 1st Whit and was kept after his voice changed (it was common practice for AIO to drop actors when their voice changed). He has the second most appearances for a child character, behind Lucy. Jimmy lived in Washington, D.C. for a while, working as a reporter for a tabloid, but eventually admitted to his dad that he wasn't in the best of places and returned to Pokenberry Falls. He then Returned for "The Triangled Web".
- Grady McKay (2004–2008), voiced by Jordan Orr, is a friend of Wooton. He is a hard ambitious and stubborn boy, with a tender heart towards his family.
- Tamika Washington (2003–2008), voiced by Courtney Brown, is the daughter of Ed and Elaine.
- Digger Digwillow (1988), voiced by Chad Reisser, was the first person to experience the Imagination Station, and the founder of "Wonderworld." Oddly enough, he was only in three episodes (The Imagination Station I & II, Heatwave).
- Isaac Morton, (1989–1993) voiced by Justin Morgan, is a friend of Lucy, although before Curt. He was a good-hearted but cowardly kid who had a lot of run-ins with a bully named Rodney Rathbone, leader of the "Bones of Rath" gang.
- Jack Davis, (1988–1989, 1992–1994, 2008) voiced by Donald Long, is another of Lucy's acquaintances. Most known for the being the "coolest" kid. He later became engaged with Lucy in "The Triangled Web".
- Curt Stevens, (1990–1992, 2008) voiced by Fabio Stephens, had a relationship with Lucy and was always getting into trouble. He also returned for "The Triangled Web".
- Jenny Roberts, Voiced by Natalie Babbitt, was the show's second of two blind characters. Despite her disability, she never let it get her down and fit in quite easily in Odyssey. In the three-episode The Perfect Witness, she was kidnapped from Holstein's Bookstore and made use of her heightened senses of smell and hearing to help catch the criminals. She was also the longtime pen-pal to Melanie Jacobs, as seen in the Episode "Pen Pal."
- Liz Horton, (1998–2007) voiced by Lauren Schaffel, was the reporter for Odyssey Owl and best friend of Mandy Straussberg. Also, it was revealed that she has a crush on Alex Jefferson in "Slumber Party".
- Jared DeWhite (1997–1999, 2001–2004, 2008), Voiced by Brandon Gilberstadt, was a trouble maker and conspiracy theorist who moved away after a few seasons. He returned during the Novacom saga (he and his family had been placed in Witness Protection) and tipped off Sarah and Mandy to the activities of Novacom. He then goes on to become the future brother-in-law of Mandy.
- Dwayne Oswald, (1997–1999) voiced by Kris Kachurak, is best known as a foil for Jared DeWhite, Dwayne began as a character who was no good at anything and turned into an honor student later on.
- Alex Jefferson, (1999–2003) voiced by Travis Tedford, played a pivotal role in the Novacom saga with his cousin Cal.
- Marvin Washington, voiced by Kyle Massey (2003), Jordan Calloway (2003–2004), and Kendré Berry (2004–2008, 2017) was a child character and an African-American; lives with his parents Ed and Elaine and his sister Tamika. While the Washington family were not the first African-American characters on Adventures in Odyssey, they are arguably the first to be considered "major" characters.
- Nick Mulligan (1997–2005), voiced by Christopher Castile, (the nephew and adopted son of Mike and Tracy Mulligan) was portrayed early on as a brash, tough-talking street kid from New York City who smoked and frequently clashed with his cousin/adopted sister Lisa, but eventually he quit smoking and became an employee at Whit's End, and his character mellowed slightly.
- Mandy Straussberg (1998–2008), voiced by Aria Curzon, is very gifted in writing stories and plays, and in the episode "The Present Long Ago", it is revealed that she will one day marry the middle school's other top student, Trent DeWhite.
- Rusty Gordon (1993–1995), Voiced by Shawn Svoboda, is a member of Rodney's gang, the Bones of Rath. He later wrote a book that painted a very negative portrait of Odyssey, which inspired Connie to write her own book. In "The Ties That Bind," he is revealed to have criminal connections.
- Trent DeWhite (2003–2008), voiced by Corey Padnos, is Jared's younger brother. Possessing a toned-down version of his brother's vivid imagination, Trent has been known to overreact and daydream at times. He is a top student at Odyssey Middle School, and at one point developed a crush on Mandy Straussberg, who he will one day marry as revealed in "The Present Long Ago".
- Shannon Everett (1992–1994), is a rich and popular cheerleader who often resorted to bullying tactics and/or deception to get her way. She used many people to benefit herself. She is also known to be the first “major” girl character to be a bully.

== Minor characters ==
- Officer Patrick O'Ryan, voiced by Will Ryan, is a slightly giddy Irish-accented Odyssey police officer who replaced Officer David Harley because Harley was perceived as a disrespectful portrayal of police officers for children. He originally appeared on June 16, 1990, in the episode "An Act of Mercy," which was a remake of the Harley episode "The Quality of Mercy."
- Edwin Blackgaard (1992–2008), voiced by Earl Boen, is the twin brother of Dr. Regis Blackgaard and owner of the Harlequin Dinner Theatre. Despite being a little full of himself, he means well and wishes to bring aesthetic to Odyssey.
- Walter Shakespeare (1992–2008), voiced by Corey Burton, is the assistant to Edwin at the Harlequin Dinner Theatre. He and Edwin live in the cramped, rat-infested studio apartment above the Harlequin.
- Doris Rathbone (1993–1998), voiced by Pamela Hayden and Diane Hsu (2007–present), is Rodney's mother.
- Harlow Doyle (1992–2000, 2005, 2008, 2010), voiced by Will Ryan. The town's resident private detective, Harlow was introduced to fill the gap left when Officer Dave Harley, a similar character, left Odyssey.
- Tasha Forbes, voiced by Christie Nimitz (1994–1996) and Mandy Steckelberg (2008, 2020), is Jason Whittaker's on-again, off-again girlfriend/fiancée. Jason almost married her before deciding against it because she wasn't a Christian.
- Joe Finneman (1991–1994), voiced by Parley Baer, was Connie's great uncle, owner of "Finneman's Market".
- June Kendall (1988–1996, 2002–2003), voiced by Maggie Malooly, is the mother of Connie. She eventually became a Christian, unlike her ex-husband Bill Kendall, and died in album 57.
- Agnes Riley, voiced by Julia Kazarian (1988) and Susan Silo (1996, 2002–2005) is Tom Riley's wife, also known to her close friends as "Rose" (her middle name). Agnes, an artistic woman who enjoys painting and music, has dementia and resides in an assisted-living facility. She was so infrequently seen by Odyssey residents that the first time Rodney Rathbone saw Tom talking to her (and being unaware that they were married), he assumed Tom was having an illicit affair with her.
- Margaret Faye (1997–1998, 2006, 2008), voiced by Alexandra Kenworthy, ran for Odyssey Mayor against Bart Rathbone and won. She had feelings for Mr. Whittaker and asked him to marry her as well as manage her campaign, but Whit, not agreeing with many of the issues she supported, declined, which infuriated her. Connie later worked on her campaign.
- Phillip Glossman (1988–1990, 1992, 1994–1995, 2008), voiced by Paul McCusker, is a state Congressman who harbors a personal vendetta against John Avery Whittaker dating back to the founding of Whit's End.
- Leonard Meltsner (2006–2007), voiced by Phil Proctor is the father of Eugene. He returned to the U.S. for a while and then returned to Africa to minister to the local natives with Eugene's brother Everett. He is now a Christian.
- Mrs. Kramer (2011–2018), voiced by Mitzi McCall, is the current librarian in Odyssey and also spends time working at the Odyssey Retirement Home. She is known to be jaded, cynical, and easily annoyed. She keeps tabs on everything and has joined every community club possible in the hope that she will get a raise. She hates at least 100 things, one of which is a Valentine's Day gift without any sweets. ("To Mend or Repair") She says she has a lack of faith in youth. ("Mistaken for Good") She dislikes Wooton with a passion.
