= Dale Peck =

American writer

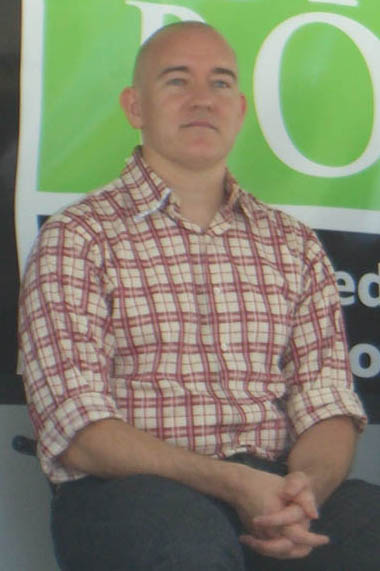
- Peck at the 2009 Brooklyn Book Festival
- Born: 1967 (age 58–59); Long Island, New York
- Education: Drew University
- Occupation: Novelist
- Writing career
- Pen name: Mean Mary

Dale Peck (born 1967) is an American novelist, literary critic, and columnist. His 2009 novel, Sprout, won the Lambda Literary Award for Children's and Young Adult Literature , and was a finalist for the Stonewall Book Award in the Children's and Young Adult Literature category.

== Early life ==
Peck was born on Long Island, New York. He was raised in Kansas and attended Drew University in New Jersey, graduating in 1989. He received a Guggenheim Fellowship in 1994.

== Career ==
Peck's first novel, Martin and John, was published in 1993. His subsequent work, which continued to explore issues of identity and sexuality, were met with more mixed reviews. Salon.com described Now It's Time to Say Goodbye as a "hyperpotboiler" with a plot "both sensational and preposterous." The New York Review of Books called Martin and John "surprisingly sophisticated", but said Now It's Time to Say Goodbye "collapsed under the weight of its overladen allegorical structures" and diagnosed Peck's fiction as a "seesaw between a strained 'lyricism' ... and cliché."

Peck has also drawn attention as a critic. His reviews for The New Republic, while establishing him as one of the most influential commentators on books, also garnered the opprobrium of the literary establishment for their negative treatment of some of the most highly regarded writers at the time, but also their underlying questioning of what would be the larger project of turn-of-the-century American letters. His most notorious line, "Rick Moody is the worst writer of his generation," set the tone for a collection of essays published under the title Hatchet Jobs.

In 1996, Peck reviewed the David Foster Wallace best-selling novel Infinite Jest, writing that "[w]hat makes the book's success even more noteworthy is that it is, in a word, terrible. Other words I might use include bloated, boring, gratuitous, and – perhaps especially – uncontrolled. I would, in fact, go so far as to say that Infinite Jest is one of the very few novels for which the phrase 'not worth the paper it's written on' has real meaning in at least an ecological sense." Peck, in the same article, also attacked American writers Jonathan Franzen, Don DeLillo, and Thomas Pynchon, characterizing the latter as "a very clever guy" and his prose as "tentacular – I might almost say ... amorphous."

Peck's reviews, in turn, were met with criticism, with the editors of Brooklyn-based n+1 magazine, though stating, in 2004, that

when The New Republic took a writer down—as it notoriously did with Toni Morrison, Judith Butler, Frank Bidart, Don DeLillo, Elaine Scarry, Colson Whitehead, Kurt Andersen, Sharon Olds, Thomas Pynchon, Zadie Smith, Jonathan Franzen, Barbara Kingsolver...[it] was the best literary section in the country

also writing:

With the emergence of the ridiculous Dale Peck, the method of Wieseltier's literary salon reached its reductio ad absurdum. Peck smeared the walls with shit, and bankrupted their authority for all time to come. So many forms of extremism turn into their opposite at the terminal stage. Thus The New Republic's supposed brief for dry, austere, high-literary value—manifesting itself for years in a baffled rage against everything new or confusing—led to Peck's auto-therapeutic wetness (as self-pity is the refuge of bullies) and hatred of classic modernism (which, to philistines, will always be new and confusing).

In May 2011, Peck's criticism of Jewish American literature in which he claimed "[I]f I have to read another book about the Holocaust, I'll kill a Jew myself" prompted a public outcry. His editors later removed the statement from his article.

In 2016, Peck was named editor-in-chief of the revived online Evergreen Review. "I want the magazine to be something between a community and a place where lone wolves hang out," Peck said at the site's launch in March 2017. "I have a preference for experimental literature, but for genuinely experimental literature as opposed to literature that says it is experimental but it is really just repeating someone else’s experiment from 70 years ago. All good literature is experimental, at least in the sense that it invents its own terms."

In 2019, Peck wrote an article published by The New Republic titled "My Mayor Pete Problem," referring to Democratic presidential candidate Pete Buttigieg, which, was subsequently criticized as homophobic. The New Republic pulled the article after hours online. Editor Chris Lehmann stated, "The New Republic recognizes that this post crossed a line, and while it was largely intended as satire, it was inappropriate and invasive." In response to the article all funders of the 2020 Democratic presidential nominee climate summit withdrew and the event was cancelled.

Peck teaches creative writing at The New School in New York City. He is also a columnist for Out.

== Personal life ==
Peck is gay and married.

== Bibliography ==
Novels

- Martin and John (1993) – released as Fucking Martin in the UK
- The Law of Enclosures (1996)
- Now It's Time to Say Goodbye (1999)
- Body Surfing (2009)
- Shift: A Novel (Gates of Orpheus Trilogy) (2010) with Tim Kring
- The Garden of Lost and Found (2012)
- Night Soil, Soho Press (2018) ISBN 978-1616957803

Children's books

- Drift House: The First Voyage (2005)
- The Lost Cities: A Drift House Voyage (2007)
- Sprout (2009)

Non-Fiction

- What We Lost (2004)
- Hatchet Jobs (2004)
- Visions and Revisions: Coming of Age in the Age of Aids (2015) ISBN 978-1616954413
