= Drift House: The First Voyage =

2005 novel by Dale Peck

- Author: Dale Peck
- Language: English
- Genre: Fantasy
- Publisher: Bloomsbury Publishing; Scholastic Books
- Publication date: 2005
- Publication place: United States
- Media type: Print (hardback & paperback)
- Pages: 437
- ISBN: 978-1-58234-969-5
- OCLC: 59360250
- LC Class: PZ7.P3338 Dri 2005
- Followed by: The Lost Cities: A Drift House Voyage

Drift House: The First Voyage is a 2005 children's novel written by Dale Peck. This was Peck's first children's book; he is best known as a polemicist reviewer, and adult novelist.

In 2007 and 2008, Chicago Public Schools placed the novel on their recommended reading list for School Grades 6–8.

== Influences ==
Dale Peck wrote the book after a friend living in Cape Cod described a dream he had had about his house floating out to sea. He cites The Lion, the Witch and the Wardrobe by C.S. Lewis as a strong influence on the book.

== Plot ==
After the 9/11 attack on New York City, the three Oakenfeld children, Susan, Charles, and Murray, are sent to live with their Uncle Farley in Canada.

Farley has recently bought a strange ship-like home named Drift House on The Bay of Eternity. The home resembles a bizarre old-time ship, washed ashore. The children immediately find the home very odd. When they question their uncle about the strange house, he becomes nervous and distracted. The children later explore the house, where they meet a talkative parrot named President Wilson.

One morning, they wake to discover the house has been raised up by a flood, carried out of the bay, and has drifted into the Sea of Time – a place where past, present, and future converge. Susan, Charles and Murray, along with Uncle Farley and President Wilson embark on an adventure where they discover evil mermaids, comical pirates, a wise whale, predictions of things to come, and a secret plot that could stop time itself.

== Main characters ==
- Susan Oakenfeld- Susan Oakenfeld is the eldest child in the family being twelve-years-old and in the eighth grade. She aspires to become a lawyer like her father, and is in her school's debating club. She is portrayed as a straight-A student with a perfectionist streak. She regularly watches the BBC World News and has a strong attachment to England, where she was born. In The First Voyage, the mermaids team with Susan to rescue their sister, and later to lock The Great Drain. Throughout the book she develops a strong friendship with a young mermaid, Diaphone, who later sacrifices herself to save Susan. Although Susan fights with her younger brother Charles frequently, she cares for both him and Murray dearly. Susan is described as having short, dark hair and being very tall and thin. She has a habit of sticking her tongue in her cheek, especially when thinking.
- Charles Oakenfeld- Charles is the middle child, a fact that he detests. Smart and scientifically minded for his age, he even takes special classes. He is also very shy and quiet though, and likes to think things through. Charles constantly argues with his older sister, Susan, mainly about her "affected" way of speaking. He has a keen interest in antiquated technology, such as old radios and televisions. He wears glasses, has brown hair, and is small for his age.
- Murray Oakenfeld- At age five, Murray is the youngest of the three Oakenfeld children. He starts out as innocent and fun-loving, but after he gets angry at Susan and hides in the dumbwaiter he comes out acting and speaking like an adult. He wears a mysterious golden locket, and has an alter ego named Mario – who is him, only five years older.

== Reception ==
Sarah Sawtelle of Kidsreads found the book a "well-crafted adventure series that is sure to be another children's classic".

== Releases and sequel ==
The book was first released in the United States and the United Kingdom in a hardcopy edition on September 17, 2005, by Bloomsbury Publishing (ISBN 1-58234-969-X). It was subsequently released as a paperback version by Scholastic Books on October 31, 2006 (ISBN 0-439-87847-0). A sequel titled The Lost Cities: A Drift House Voyage was released in 2007.
