= William Frankfather =

American actor (1944–1998)

- Born: Billy Joe Frankfather; August 4, 1944; Kermit, Texas, U.S.
- Died: December 28, 1998 (aged 54); Los Angeles, California, U.S.
- Education: New Mexico State University; Stanford University
- Occupation: Actor
- Years active: 1976–1998
- Spouse: Elizabeth Ann Leckliter (m. 1967)
- Children: 1

William Frankfather (born Billy Joe Frankfather; August 4, 1944 – December 28, 1998) was an American actor.

== Early life ==
Frankfather was born in Kermit, Texas on August 4, 1944.

== Career ==
Frankfather guest-starred in many popular television series of the late 20th century, including MacGyver, Night Court, The A-Team, Hill Street Blues, Remington Steele, Murphy Brown, Picket Fences, Star Trek: Deep Space Nine, Melrose Place, Empty Nest, Wings, NYPD Blue, Tales from the Crypt and Mama's Family.

Frankfather received his bachelor's and master's degrees, both in English literature, from New Mexico State University, and received a master of fine arts degree in acting from Stanford University.

He performed on many theater stages, including on Broadway in the original cast of Children of a Lesser God. He was a 25-year member of Theatre 40, a professional theater company in Beverly Hills, California. He was artistic director of Theatre 40 for five years up to June 1998.

Frankfather received six Drama-Logue awards for acting and producing, and as artistic director of Theatre 40, produced works by playwrights such as Mark Medoff and Sam Shepard.

His feature-film credits include Mouse Hunt, The Rocketeer, and Death Becomes Her, but is best remembered on-screen for his menacing, silent performance as killer albino Whitey Jackson in the 1978 comedy film Foul Play.

== Personal life and death ==
Frankfather died at University of California at Los Angeles Medical Center December 28, 1998, from complications of liver disease. He was 54. Frankfather is survived by his wife, Elizabeth, and his son, Richard.

== Filmography ==
=== Film ===
Year	Title	Role
1978	Foul Play	"Whitey" Jackson
1980	Inside Moves	Fryer
1981	Pennies from Heaven	Pool Player
1984	Flashpoint	Lacy
1985	Alamo Bay	Mac
1986	Invaders from Mars	Ed, Heather's father
1987	Harry and the Hendersons	Schwarz
1987	Baby Boom	Merle White
1988	Defense Play	General Phillips
1988	War Party	The Governor
1989	Valentino Returns	
1991	The Rocketeer	Government Liaison
1992	Cool World	Cop
1992	Death Becomes Her	Mr. Franklin
1992	Little Sister	Dad
1993	Born Yesterday	Senator Kelley
1993	Take My Breath Away	Warden
1994	When a Man Loves a Woman	Al-Anon Leader
1997	Do Me a Favor	Gus
1997	MouseHunt	Mr. Texas
1998	Rough Draft	Officer Joe

=== Television ===
Year	Title	Role	Notes
1985	MacGyver	Barney	Episode: "Target MacGyver"
1987	St. Elsewhere	Prison Official	Episode: "You Again?"
1987	Highway To Heaven	Mr. Lowell	Episode: "Normal People"
1990	Tales from the Crypt	Mr. Colbert	Episode: "The Secret"
1994-1995	Melrose Place	Judge David Johnson	Episodes: "And Justice for None" and "They Shoot Mothers, Don't They?"
1994	Star Trek: Deep Space Nine	Male Changeling	Episode: "The Search"
1995	Empty Nest	Minister	Episode: "Goodbye, Charley"
1995	Wings	Thurmon	Episode: "Death Becomes Him"
1996	NYPD Blue	Sam	Episode: "The Nutty Confessor"
1996	Dark Skies	Local Cop	Episode: "Moving Targets"
1998	Any Day Now		Episode: "You Shoulda Seen My Daddy"
