= Shift (novel) =

- Author: Tim Kring, Dale Peck
- Language: English
- Series: Gate of Orpheus
- Genre: Fiction, science-fiction, alternate history
- Publisher: Crown Publishing
- Publication date: August 10, 2010
- Publication place: United States
- Media type: Print (Hardback & e-book)
- Pages: 368 pp (first edition, hardback)
- ISBN: 0307453456 (first edition, hardback)
- Followed by: TBA

Shift is a 2010 alternative history book by Tim Kring and Dale Peck and is the first book in the Gates of Orpheus trilogy, originally titled as the Flag of Orpheus trilogy. The book was released on August 10, 2010 in the United States by Crown Publishing and centers around a series of secretive government experiments with LSD and its repercussions. Kring has stated that he first began work on the novel after the 2007–2008 Writers Guild of America strike and intended to make use of multiple forms of media to promote the novel and further its storyline.

== Synopsis ==
Shift is narrated through the viewpoints of multiple different characters during the 1960s, predominantly that of Chandler Forrestal. Chandler is drawn into a web of sex and deception after picking up the beautiful Naz Haverman. She gives him LSD without him being aware of it, setting him off on a series of visions and enabling him to see inside Naz's mind. The experience leaves both him and Naz shaken and eventually the two attempt to avoid capture by the CIA, only for them to track them down. Once captured, Chandler is subjected to a series of experiments.

== Reception ==
Critical reception for Shift has been mixed with Booklist praising the book while Publishers Weekly panned it. The A.V. Club gave the book a C−, calling it a "bumpy ride".
