= Tim Kring =

American screenwriter & producer (born 1957)

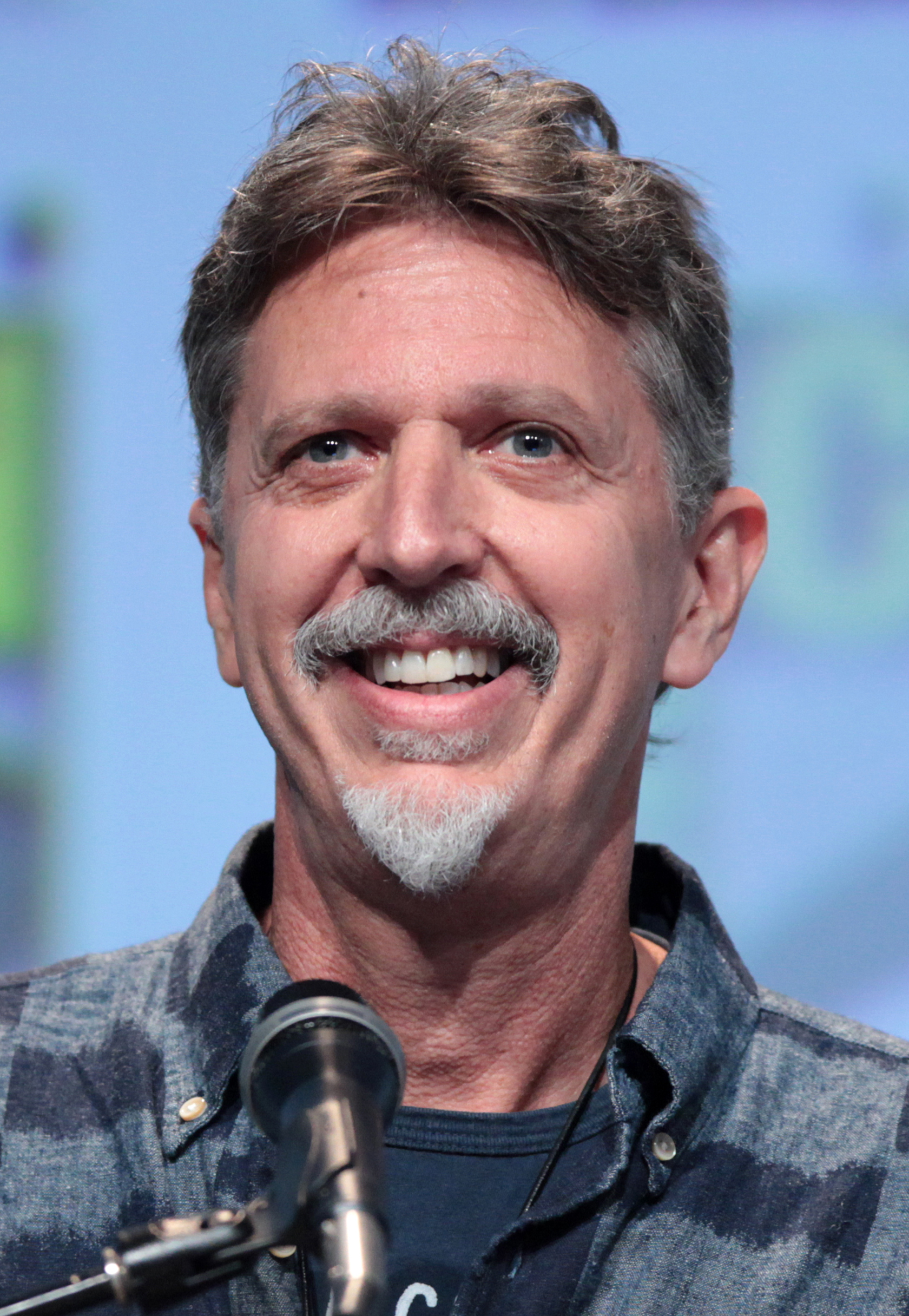
- Kring at the 2015 San Diego Comic-Con
- Born: Richard Timothy Kring; July 9, 1957 (age 69); El Dorado County, California, U.S.
- Occupations: Screenwriter, television producer
- Writing career
- Notable works: Strange World; Crossing Jordan; Heroes; Heroes Reborn; Touch

Richard Timothy Kring (born July 9, 1957) is an American screenwriter and television producer, best known for his creation of the drama series Strange World, Crossing Jordan, Heroes, and Touch.

== Early life ==
Kring was born in El Dorado County, California. He is Jewish. He has two brothers and a sister.

He attended Allan Hancock College, where his father, Ray, was the track coach, then graduated from the University of Southern California School of Cinematic Arts in 1983. Discussing his beginnings, Kring said:

I never even thought about scripts when I got out of film school. I pulled cables and shot documentaries. I finally got a gig with commercial house where I would come on with a camera crew as second assistant shooting Japanese cigarette commercials. I had an opportunity to get into the camera crew and decided I did not really want to do that with my life. So I sat down and wrote a script and went back to all the people I had met, got an agent out of it and started going out on a gazillion pitch meetings, and pitched anything I could.

== Career ==
Kring's first job as a screenwriter was for the television show Knight Rider. Other early projects included co-writing an episode of Misfits of Science (which, like his later project Heroes, featured super-powered humans as a main theme) and Teen Wolf Too with Jeph Loeb. Kring and Loeb would collaborate again when producing Heroes. Kring also co-wrote the 2010 book Shift: A Novel (Gates of Orpheus Trilogy) with Dale Peck.

In 1999, he signed a deal with NBC.

After the cancellation of Heroes in 2010 Kring created the TV series Touch, a drama focusing on a father (Kiefer Sutherland) who discovers that his mute son can predict future events. The series premiered on January 25, 2012, on Fox and was cancelled after two seasons on May 9, 2013.

On February 22, 2014, during its Olympics coverage, NBC announced Heroes was coming back as a 13-episode event miniseries titled Heroes Reborn. It premiered in 2015 with creator Tim Kring as the executive producer.

== Awards and nominations ==
Kring has been nominated for an Emmy Award in 2007 for Outstanding Drama Series as the producer for Heroes. He was also named one of the Masters of Sci Fi TV for his work on the series.

== Filmography ==
=== Film ===
Title	Year	Credited as		Notes
Title	Year	Producer	Writer	Notes
Teen Wolf Too	1987	No	Screenplay	Credited as R. Timothy Kring
Sublet	1998	No	Yes	
In the Cloud	2018	Yes	No	

=== Television ===
The numbers in writing credits refer to the number of episodes.

Title	Year	Credited as				Network	Notes
Title	Year	Creator	Producer	Writer	Executive producer	Network	Notes
Misfits of Science	1985	No	No	Yes (1)	No	NBC	Credited as R. Timothy Kring
Knight Rider	1986	No	No	Yes (1)	No	NBC	Credited as R. Timothy Kring
Bay Cove	1987	—N/a	No	Yes	No	NBC	Credited as R. Timothy Kring
Without Consent	1994	—N/a	No	Teleplay	No	ABC	Television film
Falling for You	1995	—N/a	No	Teleplay	No	CBS	Television film
Chicago Hope	1996–97	No	Yes	Yes (6)	No	CBS	Producer (season 3: 26 episodes); Supervising producer (seaspn 4: 2 episodes)
L.A. Doctors	1999	No	No	Yes (1)	No	CBS	Co-executive producer (3 episodes)
Strange World	1999–2002	Yes	No	Yes (1)	No	ABC	
Providence	1999–2001	No	No	Yes (5)	No	NBC	Co-executive producer (season 2–3)
Crossing Jordan	2001–07	Yes	No	Yes (22)	Yes	NBC	
Heroes	2006–10	Yes	Yes	Yes (16)	Yes	NBC	
Touch	2012–13	Yes	No	Yes (6)	Yes	Fox	
Daybreak	2012	Yes	No	No	Yes		Web series
Dig	2015	Yes	No	Yes (5)	Yes	USA Network	Miniseries
Heroes Reborn: Dark Matters	2015	No	No	No	Yes		Web series
Heroes Reborn	2015–16	Yes	No	Yes (2)	Yes	NBC	Miniseries
The Wilding	2016	No	No	No	Yes	USA Network	Unsold pilot
Beyond	2017–18	No	No	No	Yes	Freeform	
Treadstone	2019	Yes	No	Yes (2)	Yes	USA Network	
