= Atlantic Entertainment Group =

Defunct movie studio company

- Founded: 1974; 52 years ago in Anchorage, Alaska, United States
- Founder: Tom Coleman; Michael Rosenblatt
- Defunct: 1989; 37 years ago
- Fate: Merged with Island Pictures
- Successor: Studio: Island Pictures (1989–1998); Library: Amazon MGM Studios (through Orion Pictures)
- Headquarters: Santa Monica, California, United States
- Parent: Metro-Goldwyn-Mayer (1974–1989)
- Subsidiaries: Clubhouse Pictures

Atlantic Entertainment Group (also known as Atlantic Releasing Corporation) was an independent film production and distribution company founded by Tom Coleman and Michael Rosenblatt in 1974.

== History ==
Their initial releases were mostly geared to arthouse audiences, with an especially large number of Australian productions, as well as two Brazilian productions, Eu Te Amo (1981) and Lady on the Bus (1978), that introduced American audiences to actress Sonia Braga. They shifted their focus to small-budgeted independent films in the early 1980s, beginning with the surprise success of Valley Girl (1983), directed by Martha Coolidge. Night of the Comet, released in 1984, would be their first film to open on over 1000 screens.

By 1984, the company had signed an agreement with CBS/Fox Video, whereas a "conceptual partnership" that launched the Atlantic Video label, and among of the launch titles set up by Atlantic Video were Alphabet City, Roadhouse 66, Night of the Comet and Vamping. Atlantic International was also launched and license overseas rights to various films territory by territory.

In 1985, they began a relationship with Paramount Pictures whereby the studio provided them money for larger-scale theatrical releases in exchange for home video and television rights to their films. The company made its big break with the success of Teen Wolf, which then spawned a franchise that year. In 1985, Atlantic Releasing Corporation started the Clubhouse Pictures label, which was designed to release films for a family audience, which set up the Clubhouse Pictures Family Network of theaters.

On July 30, 1986, Jonathan Dana was hired by Atlantic Entertainment Group to supervise all Atlantic activities, via divisions Atlantic Releasing Corporation, Atlantic Television, Clubhouse Pictures and Atlantic International, and decided to "systemize" the top management to accommodate its growth to be a mini-major film studio.

In November 1987, Atlantic Entertainment teamed up with Zenith Productions for a $20 million, three-picture agreement, following the success of Wish You Were Here, which the two companies ever formed a relationship that the relationship was more subtle than a 50/50 agreement, but essentially was an equal partnership, and the two companies would hold proportionate equity in all three pictures worldwide and the first wave of pictures was a production called Patty, as well as For Queen and Country and The Wolves of Willoughby Chase, a co-production between the Czech and the U.S., and Atlantic would handle worldwide rights for the former, and had North American rights to the latter two, and foreign sales would be handled by Zenith's Sales Company.

In January 1989, Atlantic made a new deal with Kartes Video Communications for home video rights to the movies previously covered in the Paramount deal. The library was bought by Island Pictures, which took over soliciting the films to home video. Island themselves suffered financial losses soon after and was absorbed into PolyGram Filmed Entertainment in 1998. That same year, when PolyGram themselves were acquired by Seagram (parent company of Universal Studios), Seagram sold PolyGram's pre-1996 library to Metro-Goldwyn-Mayer in October 1998.

For a number of years, Paramount Pictures had television and video distribution rights to Atlantic's library, some from their previous deal with the company, and others inherited when Viacom, who had purchased television rights to many earlier Atlantic releases, merged with Paramount. MGM now owns most of the library as a result of purchasing the pre-1996 portion of PolyGram's library.

== Atlantic Releasing Corporation ==
Release date	Title
January 29, 1975	He Is My Brother
April 1, 1976	Caddie
1976	In Search of Bigfoot
September 9, 1976	Max Havelaar
February 1, 1976	Something to Hide
July 18, 1977	The Murri Affair
September 7, 1977	Bonjour Amour
1977	The Day the Music Died
November 2, 1977	Madame Rosa
April 17, 1978	Lady on the Bus
August 24, 1978	Boarding School
September 20, 1978	The Getting of Wisdom
July 21, 1978	The Hound of the Baskervilles
March 22, 1978	The Irishman
September 1978	The Odd Job
November 9, 1978	Once in Paris...
1979	Bahia
November 14, 1979	Boardwalk
August 29, 1979	Womanlight
1980	The Attic
October 1980	Below the Belt
April 30, 1980	I Sent a Letter to My Love
March 1980	Rude Boy
April 1981	Eu Te Amo
September 11, 1981	Montenegro
December 25, 1981	Peter-No-Tail
July 7, 1982	Aphrodite
1982	Breach of Contract
May 1982	By Design
September 1982	The Loveless
September 30, 1982	Norman Loves Rose
April 1982	Smash Palace
October 1982	Waltz Across Texas
April 29, 1983	Valley Girl
November 25, 1983	The Smurfs and the Magic Flute
1984	Kamla
1984	Talk to Me
May 4, 1984	Alphabet City
May 1984	Vamping
October 10, 1984	1984
September 1, 1985	City Limits
November 16, 1984	Night of the Comet
1985	Roadhouse 66
March 22, 1985	He-Man and She-Ra: The Secret of the Sword
May 24, 1985	Here Come the Littles
November 22, 1985	Starchaser: The Legend of Orin
August 23, 1985	Teen Wolf
January 11, 1985	Water
December 14, 1985	Peter-No-Tail in Americat
April 1986	Echo Park
August 22, 1986	Extremities
August 1986	The Fringe Dwellers
September 1986	The Men's Club
December 5, 1986	Modern Girls
March 7, 1986	Nomads
November 26, 1986	Nutcracker: The Motion Picture
1986	Stephen King's World of Horror
June 1986	Stoogemania
April 17, 1987	Wild Thing
May 8, 1987	Steele Justice
May 14, 1987	The Umbrella Woman
May 29, 1987	Summer Heat
July 24, 1987	Wish You Were Here
August 21, 1987	The Garbage Pail Kids Movie
November 20, 1987	Teen Wolf Too
December 4, 1987	Home Is Where the Hart Is
January 8, 1988	Cop
February 12, 1988	A Tiger's Tale
March 18, 1988	Pound Puppies and the Legend of Big Paw
April 22, 1988	Stormy Monday
June 17, 1988	A World Apart
August 11, 1988	A Summer Story
September 23, 1988	Patty Hearst
November 18, 1988	1969
May 19, 1989	For Queen and Country
July 9, 1989	A Soldier's Tale

== Clubhouse Pictures ==
The company also had a division called Clubhouse Pictures to release family films; theaters screening these titles participated in the "Clubhouse Family Network". The first films shown under this division were released on January 17, 1986. Films and television series released under this label include:

Release date	Title
January 17, 1986	The Adventures of Mark Twain
January 17, 1986	Hey There, It's Yogi Bear!
January 17, 1986	Heathcliff: The Movie
January 17, 1986	The Adventures of the American Rabbit
March 21, 1986	GoBots: Battle of the Rock Lords
September 13, 1986 – December 6, 1986	Teen Wolf
