= Rino Thunder =

American actor

- Born: October 29, 1933; Sahwachee, Colorado, U.S.
- Died: September 27, 2003 (aged 69); New York City, U.S.
- Occupation: Actor

Rino Thunder (October 29, 1933 – September 27, 2003) was an American actor best known for such films and television series as Geronimo: An American Legend, Wolfen, Hot Shots!, Beyond the Law and American Playhouse.

== Filmography ==
Year	Title	Role	Notes
1981	Wolfen	Native American	
1991	Hot Shots!	Owatonna "The Old One"	
1993	Beyond the Law	Charlie "Bogus Charlie"	
1993	Geronimo: An American Legend	Old Nana	
1994	Fresh Kill	Clayton Lightfoot	(final film role)
