= Susan Ursitti =

American actress

Susan Ursitti is an American former actress best known for her performance as Lisa "Boof" Marconi in 1985's Teen Wolf.

== Early life ==
Ursitti graduated from Saint Mary's College of Notre Dame, Indiana, in 1979, and then spent several years acting in commercials, TV, film, and stage. Her filmography includes Zapped!, Teen Wolf and Defense Play, as well as television guest roles on 21 Jump Street and Charles in Charge.

== Personal life ==
Ursitti later received her master's degree in Design and Manufacturing. In September 1992, she married Jonathan Sheinberg, the producer of such films as McHale's Navy, A Simple Wish, and The Conscientious Objector. Ursitti is a mother to three children. She is on the advisory board for Los Angeles Parks and Recreation. Ursitti describes herself as a vegetarian. She lives in Brentwood, Los Angeles.

== Filmography ==
Year	Title	Role	Notes
1982	Zapped!	Debby	
1985	Teen Wolf	Lisa 'Boof' Marconi	
1987	Funland	Actor	
1988	Doin' Time on Planet Earth	Sherry	
1988	Defense Play	Karen Vandemeer	
1989	The Runnin' Kind	Actor	
1995	The Walking Dead	Ms. Glusac	
