= James Hampton (actor) =

American actor, television director, and screenwriter (1936–2021)

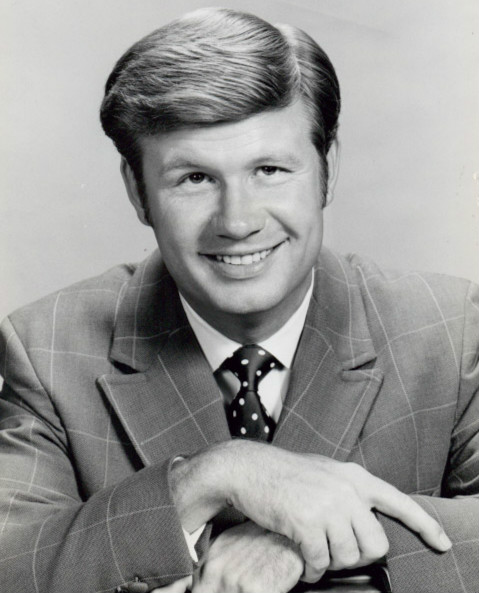
- Hampton in 1968
- Born: James Wade Hampton; July 9, 1936; Oklahoma City, Oklahoma, U.S.
- Died: April 7, 2021 (aged 84); Fort Worth, Texas, U.S.
- Other names: Jimmy Hampton; Jim Hampton
- Occupations: Actor; director; screenwriter
- Years active: 1963–2015
- Spouse: Mary Deese (m. 2002)
- Children: 3

James Wade Hampton (July 9, 1936 – April 7, 2021) was an American actor, television director, and screenwriter. He is best known for his TV roles such as Private Hannibal Shirley Dobbs on F Troop (1965–1967), Leroy B. Simpson on The Doris Day Show (1968–1969), Love, American Style (1969–1974), and his movie roles such as "Caretaker" in The Longest Yard (1974), a role which garnered him a nomination for a Golden Globe Award for Most Promising Newcomer – Male, as Howard Clemmons in Hawmps! (1976), Harold Howard in Teen Wolf (1985), and its sequel, Teen Wolf Too (1987), and as Jerry Woolridge in Sling Blade (1996).

== Early life ==
Hampton was born in Oklahoma City, Oklahoma, the son of Edna (Gately), who worked at a millinery, and Ivan Hampton, who ran a dry cleaning business. He was raised in Dallas, Texas, and majored in theatre arts at the University of North Texas in Denton. While attending UNT, he was a member of the Gamma Lambda chapter of Kappa Alpha Order. After a series of jobs including bodyguard, bartender, and photojournalist, he was inducted into the United States Army. He was stationed in Germany and performed with the USO, for which he won awards.

== Career ==
Following his service, he performed in summer stock in Texas and then moved to New York City, where he had his first film role, in the Academy Award-nominated short subject The Cliffdwellers.

His next role was as the lead character in a May 1963 Gunsmoke episode entitled "Jeb", featuring his friend and series regular Burt Reynolds. Hampton returned to Gunsmoke later that year in "Pa Hack’s Brood" (S9E13), again as a character named Jeb, although Marshal Dillon makes no reference in this episode to the previous appearance. Hampton returned to Gunsmoke one more time as the title character (and hilarious cousin to Festus) in the 1965 episode ' "Eliab’s Aim". In 1964, he was cast as publisher William Randolph Hearst in the episode "The Paper Dynasty" of the television series Death Valley Days.

Hampton is known for his roles in ABC's F Troop(1965-1967) as Hannibal Dobbs, the incompetent bugler; CBS's The Doris Day Show (1968 until March 1973) as Leroy, the handyman; Robert Aldrich's The Longest Yard (1974); Attack on Terror: The FBI vs. the Ku Klux Klan (1975); Teen Wolf (1985), and its sequel, Teen Wolf Too (1987); the Teen Wolf television series (1986 to 1989); Police Academy 5: Assignment Miami Beach (1988); and Sling Blade (1996). Hampton guest-starred as Jim Rockford's childhood friend Aaron Ironwood in a 1975 episode of NBC's The Rockford Files. He received a HALO Award for Hawmps! (1976), and a Golden Globe Award nomination for "Most Promising Newcomer" for the part of "Caretaker" in The Longest Yard. In 1980, he starred alongside Gary Collins in the low-budget movie Hangar 18. In 2012 Hampton appeared in an advertisement on MeTV touting some of the shows in which he had guest-starred, including Gomer Pyle, U.S.M.C. and The Rockford Files.

== Personal life ==
Hampton married actress Mary Deese in 2002.

== Death ==
He died of complications from Parkinson's disease on April 7, 2021, at his home in Fort Worth, Texas. He was 84.

== Filmography ==
Film
| Year | Title | Role | Notes |
|---|---|---|---|
| 1968 | Fade In | George | |
| 1970 | Soldier Blue | Private Menzies | |
| 1972 | Justin Morgan Had a Horse | Aaron | |
| 1973 | The Man Who Loved Cat Dancing | Jimmy | Uncredited |
| 1974 | The Longest Yard | Caretaker | |
| 1975 | W.W. and the Dixie Dancekings | Junior | |
| 1975 | Mackintosh and T.J. | Cotton | |
| 1975 | Hustle | Bus Driver | |
| 1976 | Hawmps! | Howard Clemmons | |
| 1978 | The Cat from Outer Space | Captain Anderson | |
| 1979 | The China Syndrome | Bill Gibson | |
| 1980 | Hangar 18 | Lew Price | Alternative title: Invasion Force |
| 1981 | Condorman | Harry Oslo | |
| 1985 | Teen Wolf | Harold Howard | |
| 1987 | Teen Wolf Too | Uncle Harold Howard | |
| 1988 | Police Academy 5: Assignment Miami Beach | Mayor of Miami | |
| 1990 | Pump Up the Volume | Arthur Watts | |
| 1991 | The Giant of Thunder Mountain | Jesse | |
| 1996 | Sling Blade | Jerry Woolridge | |
| 2000 | Danny and Max | Sheriff | |
| 2000 | Lost in the Pershing Point Hotel | Pediatrician | |
| 2008 | Fire from Below | Griffith | |
| 2011 | Jacob | Mayor Jack Flynn | |
| 2011 | The Last Ride | Judge Matheny | |
| 2014 | Flutter | Leon | |
| 2014 | Big Stone Gap | Reverend Manning | |
| 2015 | Divine Access | Mr. Bernstein | |
| 2016 | The Association | Gene Seward | Direct-to-video |

Television
| Year | Title | Role | Notes |
|---|---|---|---|
| 1963–1965 | Gunsmoke | Jeb Willis / Eliab Haggen | 3 episodes, credited as Jim Hampton |
| 1964 | Death Valley Days | William Randolph Hearst | 1 episode |
| 1965 | Gomer Pyle, U.S.M.C. | Branch Eversole | 1 episode, credited as Jim Hampton |
| 1965 | Rawhide | Charlie Peck, The Blackmailer | Episode: "Mrs. Harmon" |
| 1965–1967 | F Troop | Private Hannibal Shirley Dobbs | 65 episodes |
| 1967 | Cimarron Strip | Sam | 1 episode |
| 1968–1969 | The Doris Day Show | Leroy B. Simpson | 14 episodes |
| 1970 | Bracken's World | J.F. Nash | 1 episode |
| 1972 | The Wonderful World of Disney | Aaron | 2 episodes |
| 1972 | The F.B.I. | Charles 'Red' Brian Clayborne | 1 episode |
| 1973 | Hawkins | Earl Coleman | Episode: "A Life for a Life" |
| 1974 | The Manhunter | Lon Tyrell | 1 episode |
| 1975 | Attack on Terror: The FBI vs. the Ku Klux Klan | Harry Dudley | Television movie |
| 1975 | Mannix | Billy Lee | 1 episode |
| 1975 | The Rockford Files | Aaron Ironwood | 1 episode |
| 1977 | The Red Hand Gang | Tosca (Kidnapper) | 5 episodes |
| 1977 | The Amazing Howard Hughes | Wilbur Peterson | Television movie |
| 1977 | The Tonight Show | Himself | May 4, 1977 episode |
| 1978 | Mary | Skit Characters | 3 episodes |
| 1979 | Centennial | Defense Attorney Prescott | Miniseries |
| 1980 | B.A.D. Cats | Link | Unknown episodes |
| 1980 | The Dukes of Hazzard | Sheriff Buster Moon | Episode: "Return of the Ridge Raiders" |
| 1981 | Stand By Your Man | Billy Sherrill | Television movie |
| 1981–1982 | Maggie | Len Weston | 8 episodes |
| 1982 | World War III | Richard Hickman | Miniseries |
| 1983 | The Greatest American Hero | Sheriff | 1 episode |
| 1983 | Boone | Mr. Slater | Episode: "The Graduation" |
| 1983 | Tales of the Gold Monkey | Alan Shoemate | Episode: "Cooked Goose" |
| 1984 | The Burning Bed | Police Witness | Television movie |
| 1984 | Matt Houston | Mr. Stevens | 2 episodes |
| 1984–1985 | Who's the Boss? | Herb / Officer | 2 episodes |
| 1984–1986 | Murder, She Wrote | Veterinarian / Jerry Blevins | 2 episodes |
| 1985 | Otherworld | Fred Roach | 1 episode |
| 1985 | Simon & Simon | Odell Mitchell | 1 episode |
| 1986–1989 | Punky Brewster | Alvin / Jimmy John | 2 episodes |
| 1986–1987 | Teen Wolf | Harold Howard (Voice) | 21 episodes |
| 1987 | Houston Knights | Scully | 3 episodes |
| 1988 | Superboy | Coach | Episode: The Fixer |
| 1989 | Mama's Family | Keith Wheeler | Episode: "The Mama of Invention" |
| 1989 | Days of Our Lives | Saul Taylor | 49 episodes |
| 1989–1990 | Full House | Mr. Malatesta | 3 episodes |
| 1990 | Perfect Strangers | Mac McIntyre | Episode: "Nightmare Vacation" |
| 1990 | Newhart | Father Ken | 1 episode |
| 1990 | Get a Life | Fletcher | 1 episode |
| 1991 | The Hogan Family | Raymond | 1 episode |
| 1992–1993 | Evening Shade | - | Director, 7 episodes |
| 1993 | Hearts Afire | - | Director, 1 episode |
| 1994 | Melrose Place | Harry Alan | Episode: "It's a Bad World After All" |
| 1995 | Hope and Gloria | Bob | 1 episode |
| 1997 | Fired Up | Ben Franklin | 1 episode |
| 1997–1998 | Grace Under Fire | - | Director, 4 episodes |
| 1997–1998 | Smart Guy | - | Director, 3 episodes |
| 1997–1998 | Sister, Sister | - | Director, 5 episodes |
| 1998–1999 | Linc's | - | Director, 3 episodes |
| 2000 | Zoe, Duncan, Jack and Jane | - | Director, 3 episodes |

== Awards and nominations ==
| Year | Award | Category | Work | Result |
|---|---|---|---|---|
| 1975 | Golden Globe Awards | Most Promising Newcomer – Male | The Longest Yard | Nominated |
| 1996 | Screen Actors Guild Awards | Outstanding Performance by an Ensemble in a Motion Picture | Sling Blade | Nominated |
