= Teen Wolf Too =

1987 film by Christopher Leitch

- Theatrical release poster
- Directed by: Christopher Leitch
- Screenplay by: R. Timothy Kring
- Story by: Jeph Loeb (Note: Credited as "Joseph Loeb III."); Matthew Weisman
- Based on: Characters by Jeph Loeb; Matthew Weisman
- Produced by: Kent Bateman
- Starring: Jason Bateman; Kim Darby; John Astin; Paul Sand; James Hampton; Mark Holton; Estee Chandler; Stuart Fratkin
- Cinematography: Jules Brenner
- Edited by: Raja Gosnell; Steven Polivka; Harvey Rosenstock; Kim Secrist
- Music by: Mark Goldenberg
- Distributed by: Atlantic Releasing Corporation
- Release date: November 20, 1987
- Running time: 94 minutes
- Country: United States
- Language: English
- Budget: $4–7 million
- Box office: $7.9 million

Teen Wolf Too is a 1987 American fantasy comedy film directed by Christopher Leitch from a screenplay by R. Timothy Kring. It serves as a standalone sequel to Teen Wolf (1985), and the third installment overall in the Teen Wolf franchise. The film stars Jason Bateman, in his feature film debut, as the cousin to Michael J. Fox's character from the first installment. James Hampton, John Astin and Kim Darby feature in supporting roles.

== Plot ==
Todd Howard, the cousin of Scott Howard, has recently been accepted into Hamilton University on a full athletic scholarship on the recommendation of Coach Bobby Finstock, who was Scott's basketball coach at Beacontown High. Finstock's hope is that Todd has the family genes to become a werewolf and turn his new struggling boxing team into championship contenders.

Having never been very good at sports, and because he is more interested in being a veterinarian, Todd is certain that Finstock has the wrong guy. During a meet and greet reception of school alumni, he has his first "wolf-out" while dancing with a seductive hostess.

At first, Todd is horrified by his "family affliction", and fellow students begin to harass him. Then, during his first boxing match, after nearly getting knocked out, Todd has his second "wolf-out" only this time he is able to display his supernatural agility and strength and has a dramatic come from behind victory, thus earning the admiration of the students as well as the strict Dean Dunn.

With his newfound fame comes girls, top grades and even a car from the dean but as the year goes on, Todd realizes that he is losing his friends and self-respect. He seeks advice from his uncle, Scott's father, Harold Howard, who helps him come to terms with his responsibilities and prepares him for the championship. Todd also reconnects with his girlfriend, Nicki, who helps him regain his focus on being humble.

Todd then decides that he will fight his championship match against Steve "Gus" Gustavson, who he had prior issues with, as himself rather than the wolf much to the dismay of all except his uncle, girlfriend and Professor Tanya Brooks. Brooks, who unbeknownst to Todd is also a werewolf, intimidates Dean Dunn with glowing red eyes, growling, and swaying her tail.

After losing round after round, and nearly getting knocked out, Todd is tempted to become the wolf until he sees Nicki mouth the words "I love you" to him. This gives him the strength to overcome Gus and knocks him out to a roaring ovation.

== Cast ==
- Jason Bateman as Todd Howard
- Kim Darby as Professor Tanya Brooks
- John Astin as Dean Dunn
- Paul Sand as Coach Bobby Finstock
- James Hampton as Uncle Harold Howard
- Mark Holton as Chubby
- Estee Chandler as Nicki
- Stuart Fratkin as Rupert "Stiles" Stilinski
- Robert Neary as Steve "Gus" Gustavson
- Beth Ann Miller as Lisa Goldfluss
- Rachel Sharp as Emily
- William H. Burton as Pug
- David Burton as Peter
- Kathleen Freeman as Admissions Lady

== Production ==
James Hampton and Mark Holton are the only actors to reprise their roles from Teen Wolf (1985), as Harold Howard and Chubby respectively. The characters of Coach Finstock and Stiles returned for the sequel, but were re-cast with Paul Sand as Finstock and Stuart Fratkin as Stiles. Fratkin has claimed the character he played is not the same Stiles played by Jerry Levine in the first Teen Wolf: "I maintain they are different family members. The Stiles from Teen Wolf is called Rupert “Stiles” Stilinsky and my character from Teen Wolf Too is Ridley “Stiles” Stilinsky. Look it up." Principal photography began in June 1987 and shot on location at Claremont Colleges in Claremont, California.

== Reception ==
Teen Wolf Too received near-universally negative reviews from critics. The film holds an 8% rating on Rotten Tomatoes based on 24 reviews. The site's critics consensus reads, "Aiming for the low bar set by its predecessor and never coming close to clearing it, Teen Wolf Too is an unfunny sequel whose bark is just as awful as its bite." On Metacritic, the film has an 8 out of 100 rating based on 5 critics, indicating "overwhelming dislike".

On their show, Gene Siskel and Roger Ebert specifically gave the film two emphatic thumbs down, with Ebert complaining that they had picked, along with Date with an Angel, the two worst films possible to be released on the same day.

== See also ==
- List of boxing films
