= Townsend Coleman =

American voice actor and DJ (born 1954)

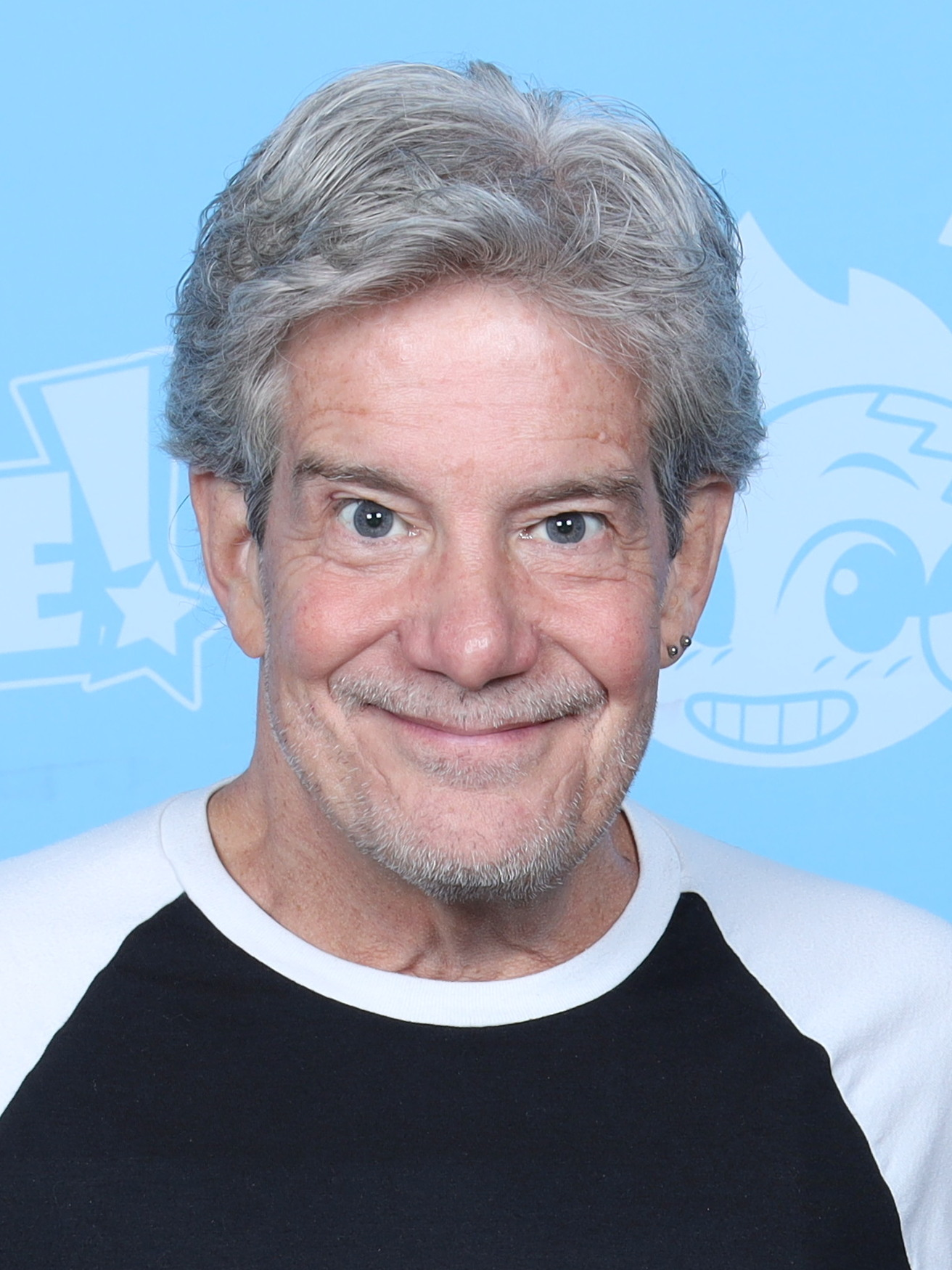
- Coleman at Animate! Columbus in 2024
- Born: Townsend Putnam Coleman III; May 28, 1954 (age 72); New York City, New York, United States
- Occupations: Voice actor, DJ
- Years active: 1974–present

Townsend Putnam Coleman III (born May 28, 1954) is an American voice actor who has performed in many animated series and TV commercials beginning in the early 1980s. Among his most notable roles are Michaelangelo from Teenage Mutant Ninja Turtles, Wayne Gretzky on ProStars, Jason Whittaker in Adventures in Odyssey and the title characters in Where's Waldo? and The Tick.

== Early life ==
Townsend Putnam Coleman III was born in New York City, New York, but his family relocated to Denver, Colorado in 1955.

== Career ==
=== Early work ===
Coleman was a disc jockey for WGCL in Cleveland, Ohio in the late 1970s. This included the weekend of July 7–8, 1979, when that radio station presented his own take on American Top 40 after the station's refusal to air the "Top 40 Disco Songs" special for that weekend.

In the same period, Coleman appeared in several plays through Jerry Leonard's Heights Youth Theater ensemble. The plays were staged at Wiley Junior High School in University Heights, Ohio – just down the road from John Carroll University. Other famous performers who appeared in Leonard's plays include the actress Carol Kane.

Shortly before becoming a voice actor, he hosted a pair of dance shows for local television stations: We're Dancin' at WNEW in New York City (now WNYW) and The Dance Show at WSB-TV in Atlanta.

=== Voice acting ===
Coleman's career as a voice actor took off in the 1980s when, having recently moved to Los Angeles, he auditioned for the role of Corporal Capeman on Inspector Gadget. He also portrayed Riot on Jem, Gobo in the animated version of Jim Henson's Fraggle Rock, Scott Howard on the animated Teen Wolf and many others. In TV commercials, he was the 7-Up "Spot", Keebler Elves, and Raid Bugs. Coleman has also been the voice of NBC commercials for programs such as Must See TV and The Tonight Show since the early 1990s. Coleman has also provided the voice for Jason Whittaker on the Focus on the Family radio drama Adventures in Odyssey since 1994. He also voiced the Autobot Mini-Cassette Rewind on the Transformers cartoon series (1986) and provided the voice of Colt in Saber Rider and the Star Sheriffs.

From 1987 to 1996, Coleman voiced Michelangelo in Teenage Mutant Ninja Turtles. Coleman also provided the voice for The Tick in the 1994 cartoon series, for which he received an Annie Award nomination. Coleman performed a wide range of voices in King's Quest VI: Heir Today, Gone Tomorrow, including Vizier Abdul Alhazred, Shamir Shamazel, Lord Azure, Ferryman, Beast and the Minotaur.

Coleman returned to the Transformers franchise by voicing Sentinel Prime in the Transformers Animated series. The character was designed to look like The Tick, as confirmed by the writers of the show at BotCon 2008, Coleman also provided the voice of Neddy the Mallet in the Cartoon Network series, Mighty Magiswords (2015).

In 2016, Coleman returned to the Tick franchise, voicing the ex-superhero dog Midnight in the Amazon Prime live-action series.

== Filmography ==
=== Film ===
Year	Title	Role	Notes
1986	Black Moon Rising	Waiter	Live action
1986	The Kingdom Chums: Little David's Adventure	Eliab, Fox Soldier #2	Television film
1986	The Amazing Adventures of Inspector Gadget	Cpl. Capeman	
1987	Alice Through the Looking Glass	Tom Fool	Television film
1988	Yogi and the Invasion of the Space Bears	Zor One	Television film
1992	FernGully: The Last Rainforest	Knotty	
1998	Batman & Mr. Freeze: SubZero	Additional voices	Direct-to-video
1998	Buster & Chauncey's Silent Night	Father Joseph (speaking voice)	Direct-to-video
2000	The Crippled Lamb	Samuel, Daniel, Joseph	Television film
2007	Superman: Doomsday	Drill Operator	Direct-to-video
2008	Justice League: The New Frontier	Will Magnus	Direct-to-video
2013	Batman: The Dark Knight Returns	Morrie	Direct-to-video
2013	Lego Batman: The Movie – DC Super Heroes Unite	Commissioner Gordon	Direct-to-video
2016	Sing	Harry	
2018	The Grinch	Additional Voices	
2019	Once Upon a Time in Hollywood	The F.B.I. Intro Announcer (voice)	uncredited

=== Television ===
Year	Title	Role	Notes
1985	Inspector Gadget	Corporal Capeman/Sweetly	
1986	The Transformers	Mini-Cassette Rewind, Martin	
1986–1987	Teen Wolf	Scott Howard / Teen Wolf	
1987–1996	Teenage Mutant Ninja Turtles	Michaelangelo; Rat King; Krang; Shredder; Usagi Yojimbo; Rahzar; Screwloose additional voices	
1987	Fraggle Rock: The Animated Series	Gobo Fraggle, Architect Doozer	13 episodes
1988	Jem and the Holograms	Rory "Riot" Llewelyn	
1988	Superman	Teenage Clark Kent, Ted Kline	
1989	Ring Raiders	Yasu Yakamura	
1990	TaleSpin	Turkey Client, Newsreel Announcer	Episode: "From Here to Machinery"
1991	Darkwing Duck	Patrick	Episode: "Whiffle While You Work"
1991	Where's Waldo?	Waldo	
1991–1992	Space Cats	Scratch	
1992	Batman: The Animated Series	Chick	Episode: "It's Never Too Late"
1994–1996	The Tick	The Tick	
1995–1996	Timon & Pumbaa	Vulture Police, Purplest Stupidest Pirate	
1995–1997	Spider-Man: The Animated Series	Silvermane (Young)	2 episodes
1996	Mighty Ducks: The Animated Series	Canard	2 episodes
1996	Superman: The Animated Series	Various voices	4 episodes
1997–1999	The New Batman Adventures	Rocco, Mugsy	2 episodes
1997–1998	Pinky and the Brain	Various voices	8 episodes
1998	Animaniacs	Pressberg Katzeneisnerman	Episode: "Hooray for North Hollywood"
1998	I Am Weasel	Hector, Prisoner	Episode: "I Stand Corrected"
1998–2002	The Sylvester & Tweety Mysteries	Various voices	3 episodes
1999–2000	Batman Beyond	False-Face, Lieutenant	2 episodes
1999	Pinky, Elmyra & the Brain	Claude Gristle	Episode: "Hooray for Meat"
2002	Spy TV	Announcer	2 episodes
2005	Duck Dodgers	Superego Dodgers, Protectorate #2	Episode: "A Lame Duck Mind"
2007	The Batman	Campus Guard	Episode: "Seconds"
2007–2009	Transformers: Animated	Sentinel Prime, additional voices	13 episodes
2014–2017	Teenage Mutant Ninja Turtles	80s Michelangelo, Clerk	5 episodes
2015	Hulk and the Agents of S.M.A.S.H.	Hercules	Episode: "The Tale of Hercules"
2016–2018	Mighty Magiswords	Neddy the Mallet, various voices	
2017–2018	The Tick	Midnight, Onward	

=== Video games ===
Year	Title	Role	Notes
1992	King's Quest VI	Vizier Abdul Alhazred, Shamir Shamazel, Lord Azure	
2007	Mass Effect	Lord Darius, Rafael Vargas, Zabaleta	
2012	Lego Batman 2: DC Super Heroes	Mr. Freeze, Mad Hatter, Commissioner Gordon, General Zod	
2012	Spec Ops: The Line	Soldiers	
2021	Nickelodeon All-Star Brawl	Michelangelo	Voiceover added in 2022 update
2022	Teenage Mutant Ninja Turtles: Shredder's Revenge	Michelangelo, Rat King, Rahzar	
2022	Nickelodeon Kart Racers 3: Slime Speedway	Michelangelo	

=== Radio ===
Year	Title	Role	Notes
1994–present	Adventures in Odyssey	Jason Whittaker	131 episodes

=== Announcer ===
- NBC advertising (1992–2009)
