= Paul Rea =

American journalist

- Paul Rea New York 2007
- Born: Paul Virgil Rea; September 6, 1968 (age 57); Clarkesville, Georgia, U.S.
- Education: University of Georgia
- Occupation: media personality/journalist

Paul V. Rea is an American radio, TV and web journalist, and media personality based in Clarkesville, Georgia.

== Early life ==
Rea was born in Clarkesville, Georgia to Judy, a florist, and James M. Rea, an attorney. According to his mother, he wanted to be a DJ at an early age. When he was 6, Rea called a radio classifieds show, Dial and Deal on WIAF-AM, offering to sell his older sister. There were no takers. He also hosted the morning announcements at Habersham Central High School.

== Broadcasting career ==
=== 1980s ===
Rea began his career in 1983 at age 14 as an afternoon and weekend radio host and News Anchor for Clarkesville's WIAF. He was one of the station's youngest DJs.

After completing high school, Rea went on to attend the University of Georgia, where he majored in journalism. During his freshman year of college, Rea worked for both WGAU and WNGC as a DJ. Rea left the stations in 1988 to work for cross-town rival WBKZ, where he held the largely ceremonial title of Afternoon News Director.

Writing and reporting news was a fraction of Rea's job. He was mostly a Disc Jockey playing oldies records from the 1950s and 1960s. While working for the station, he scored one significant story for it. During the 1988 Democratic National Convention in Atlanta, actor Rob Lowe became involved in a sex scandal with a 16-year-old girl. Rea managed to get one of the few interviews with Hue Henry, the attorney who sued Lowe on behalf of the girl and her mother. In 1989 Rea returned to WNGC as the host of their All Night Request Show.

=== 1990s ===
In 1991 Rea was promoted to music director and Midday Host at WNGC. His work on the popular Paul Rea Midday led to an offer to host an afternoon video music show on Athens TV station WNGM-TV. In 1992 he joined actress/model Eaddy Thomas (Eaddy Mays) to co-host a morning news show on WNGM.

When the show was canceled in 1994, Rea went back to radio at Magic 102.1 FM in Athens. He was reunited with Thomas and hosted a successful morning show for the station until leaving again for television news.

In 1997 he joined WNEG-TV the CBS affiliate in Toccoa, Georgia as a reporter and then as anchor of the Daybreak morning news show.

=== 2000-present ===
He joined WSAV-TV in Savannah in 2000 as a photojournalist. During his year at the station, he began his investigation of the Tybee Bomb.

The nuclear weapon was lost near Tybee Island, Georgia in the 1950s. With the help of amateur bomb hunters, Rea discovered documents that showed the weapon might still be dangerous, due to a small quantity of plutonium believed to be inside. These reports were rejected by the United States Department of Defense but the United States Air Force reopened the investigation, first in 2001 and again in 2005. Both recent investigations maintain the weapon is lost and no danger to the public.

In the summer of 2000, Rea was attacked while covering a story in Coffee County, Georgia. The incident came to light in a November 2005 article on TV journalists in Georgia Trend magazine. The article, "Who's Who in TV News" by Jerry Grillo, ranked Rea as one of the top reporters in the state.

Grillo wrote:

Though Rea almost certainly is the only person on Georgia Trend's Who's Who list of TV news people to have taped his own beating, his experience defines the pluck and tenacity of the TV journalist.

While the magazine claims Rea's camera was rolling during the attack, the footage was never broadcast.

Rea returned to anchor, write and produce the morning show at WNEG-TV in 2001. He also produced the station's popular Georgia Journey segments, showcasing unique people and places in Northeast Georgia.

Rea returned to WSAV-TV in 2003 to oversee the station's Community Report, covering neighborhood issues such as crime, blight, policing issues, and poverty in Savannah. Special reports include Counting Cops, in which he showed the Savannah Metropolitan Police Department was seriously understaffed, and Houses From Hell, which drew attention to some of the city's worst dilapidated houses.

Rea left his position at WSAV-TV in 2008. In 2009 he began working as a Media and Messaging Consultant for government and corporate clients including the City of Savannah.

He was a news reader on Fox News Radio 810 WYZI in Royston, Georgia from 2010 to 2014.

On September 24, 2010, Rea debuted as the anchor of Newsnight on the Patriot, on WRWR-LD channel 38.1 in Warner Robins, Georgia. but this position was temporary. Behind the scenes, Rea was tasked with developing all programming for the fledgling station. During the six months of the station's launch, Rea oversaw the development of four original local programs, including a two-hour nightly local newscast. He helped transition two existing shows from radio to television.

In 2011 Rea returned to Savannah to provide media and messaging support to political clients in advance of that year's municipal elections. As of 2015, he returned to his hometown of Clarkesville, Georgia where he was a contributor to local news website nowhabersham.com.
