= WLOV =

WLOV refers to the following broadcasting stations in the United States:

- WLOV (AM), a radio station (1370 AM) licensed to Washington, Georgia
- WLOV-FM, a radio station (99.5 FM) licensed to Daytona Beach Shores, Florida
- WLOV-LP, a defunct radio station (98.3 FM) formerly licensed to Moultrie, Georgia
- WLOV-TV, a television station (channel 27 virtual/16 digital) licensed to West Point, Mississippi
- WPUP, a radio station (100.1 FM) licensed to Athens, Georgia, which held the call sign WLOV from 1978 to 1984
- WUUQ, a radio station (97.3 FM) licensed to South Pittsburg, Tennessee, which held the call sign WLOV-FM from 1999 to 2003
