= Teen Wolf season 3 =

Teen Wolf
- Season 3
- DVD cover for both parts
- Starring: Tyler Posey; Crystal Reed; Dylan O'Brien; Tyler Hoechlin; Holland Roden
- No. of episodes: 24

Release
- Original network: MTV
- Original release: June 3, 2013 – March 24, 2014

Season chronology
- ← Previous; Season 2 Next → Season 4

The third season of Teen Wolf, an American supernatural drama created by Jeff Davis, premiered on June 3, 2013. The series was renewed for a third season of 24 episodes on July 12, 2012.

== Plot ==
=== Part 1 ===
Jackson Whittemore (Colton Haynes) has moved to London. A new teacher, Jennifer Blake (Haley Webb), has joined Beacon Hills High school with a keen eye for Derek. While infiltrating the Alpha Pack who have taken refuge in a bank, they discover that Erica Reyes (Gage Golightly) is dead and Derek's sister Cora Hale (Adelaide Kane) is a prisoner and free them.

Scott McCall (Tyler Posey), Allison Argent (Crystal Reed), Derek Hale (Tyler Hoechlin) and the rest of the gang find themselves up against a new enemy: the lethal Alpha pack that has come to Beacon Hills, who have kidnapped Vernon Boyd (Sinqua Walls). Not only that but a mysterious, threatening, supernatural Druid has been taking categorized people as sacrifices, killing them and absorbing their power to go against the Alpha pack.

=== Part 2 ===
While Scott (Tyler Posey) struggles to find his place as an Alpha, he, Allison (Crystal Reed) and Stiles (Dylan O'Brien) begin to experience strange side effects as a result of reigniting the power within Beacon Hills. Scott loses his ability to control his werewolf shift, Allison sees visions of her dead aunt, Kate, and Stiles believes he is awake while dreaming and dreaming while awake. They soon discover that the answer to their problems may be found in a new student named Kira Yukimura (Arden Cho), a girl with remarkable powers of her own.

The pack is threatened by the Nogitsune, a spirit which possesses Stiles, forcing him to complete tasks meant to cause chaos and strife, which the Nogitsune feeds off of. Scott struggles to find a way to save Stiles without killing him. They also encounter the Oni, spirits summoned by Kira's mother, Noshiko, to defeat the Nogitsune.

== Cast ==
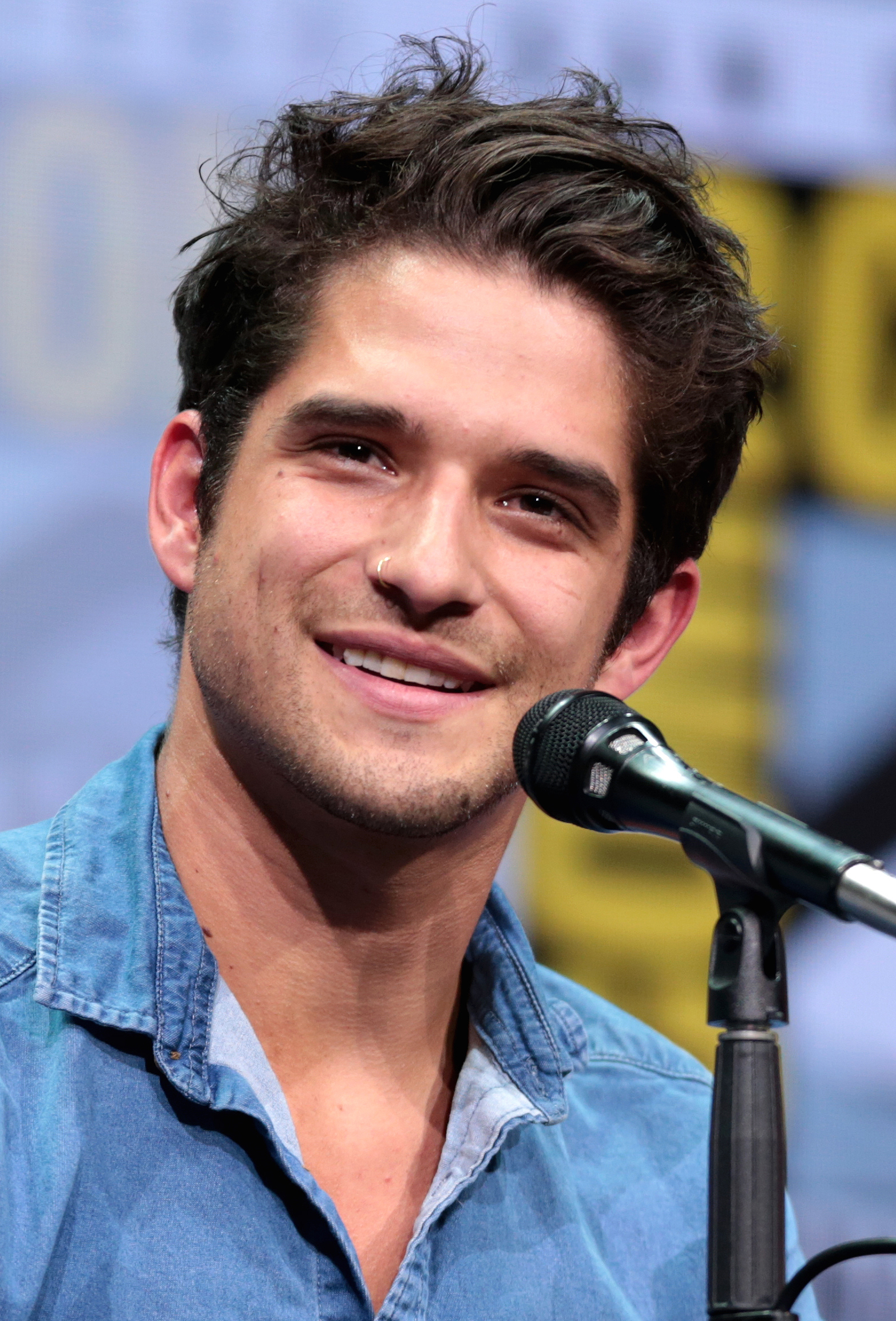
Tyler Posey
(Scott McCall)

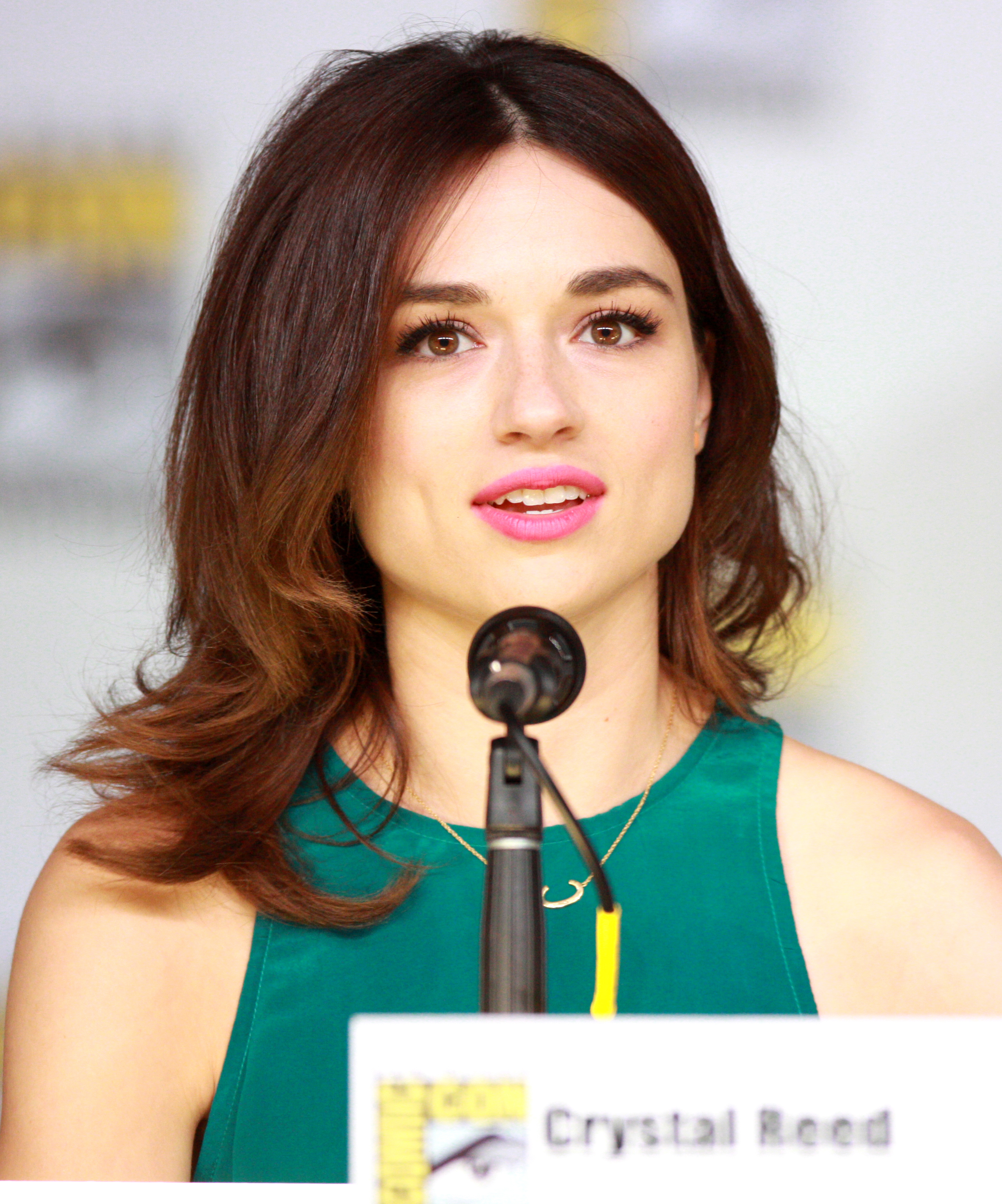
Crystal Reed
(Allison Argent)

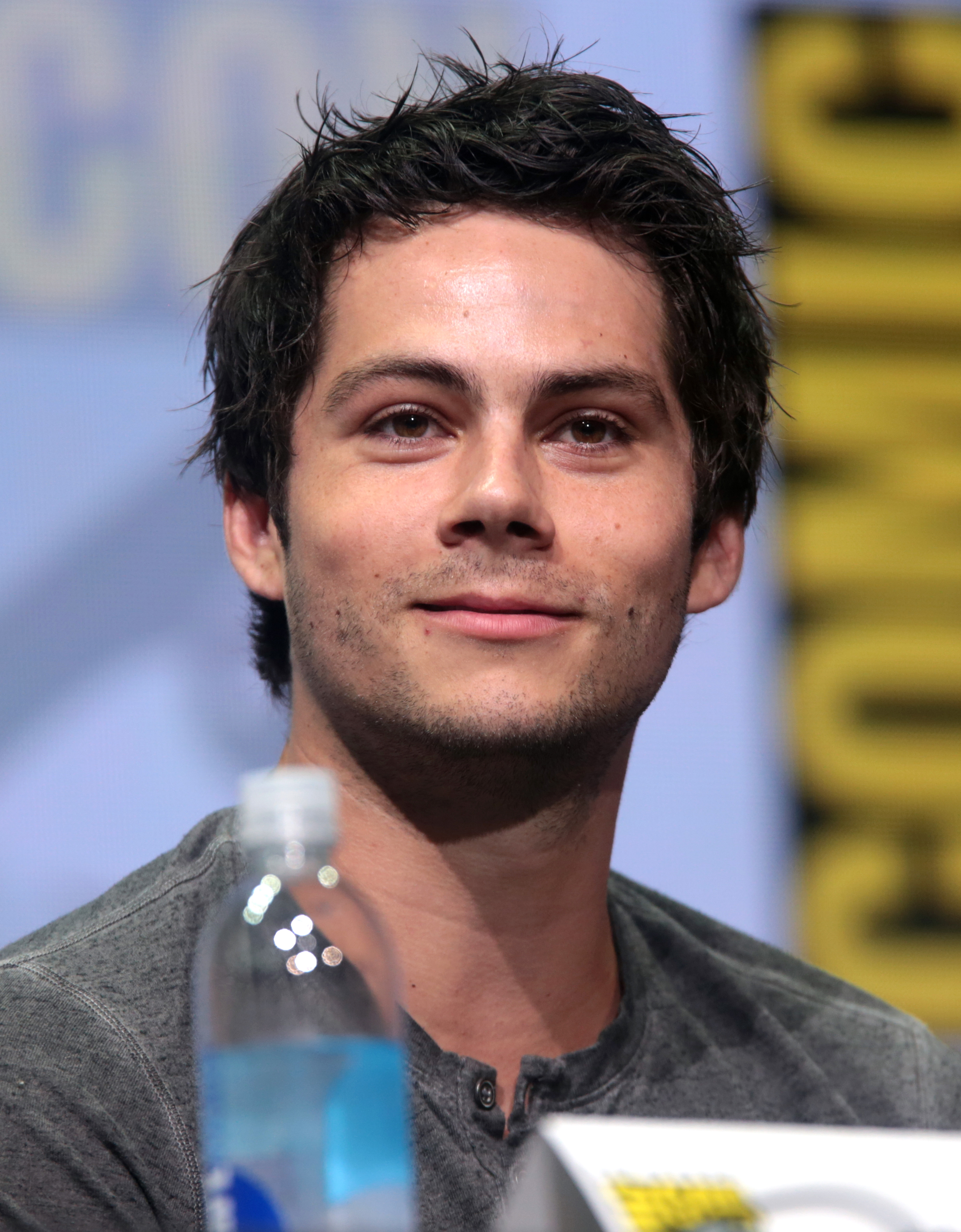
Dylan O'Brien
(Stiles Stilinski)

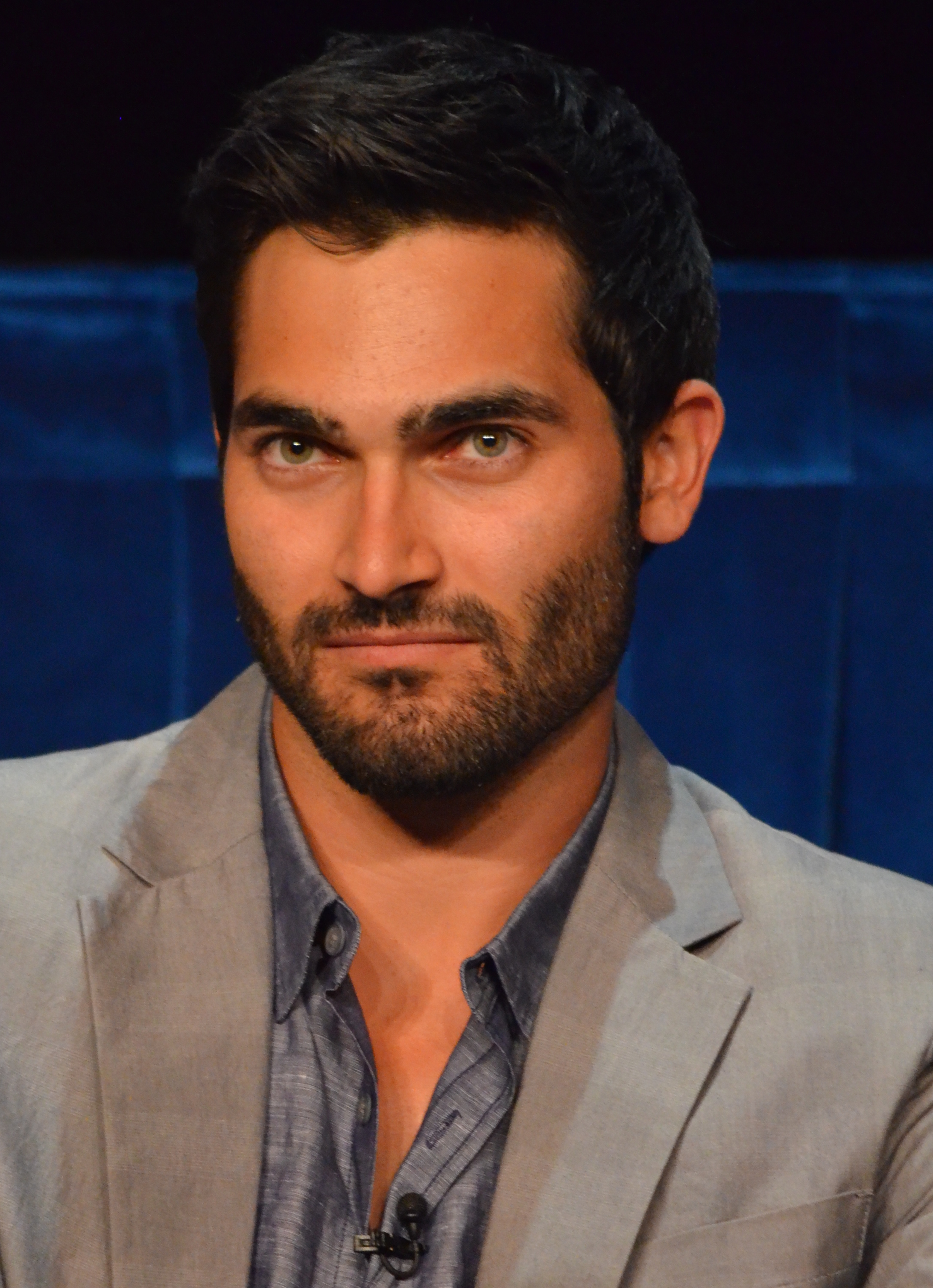
Tyler Hoechlin
(Derek Hale)

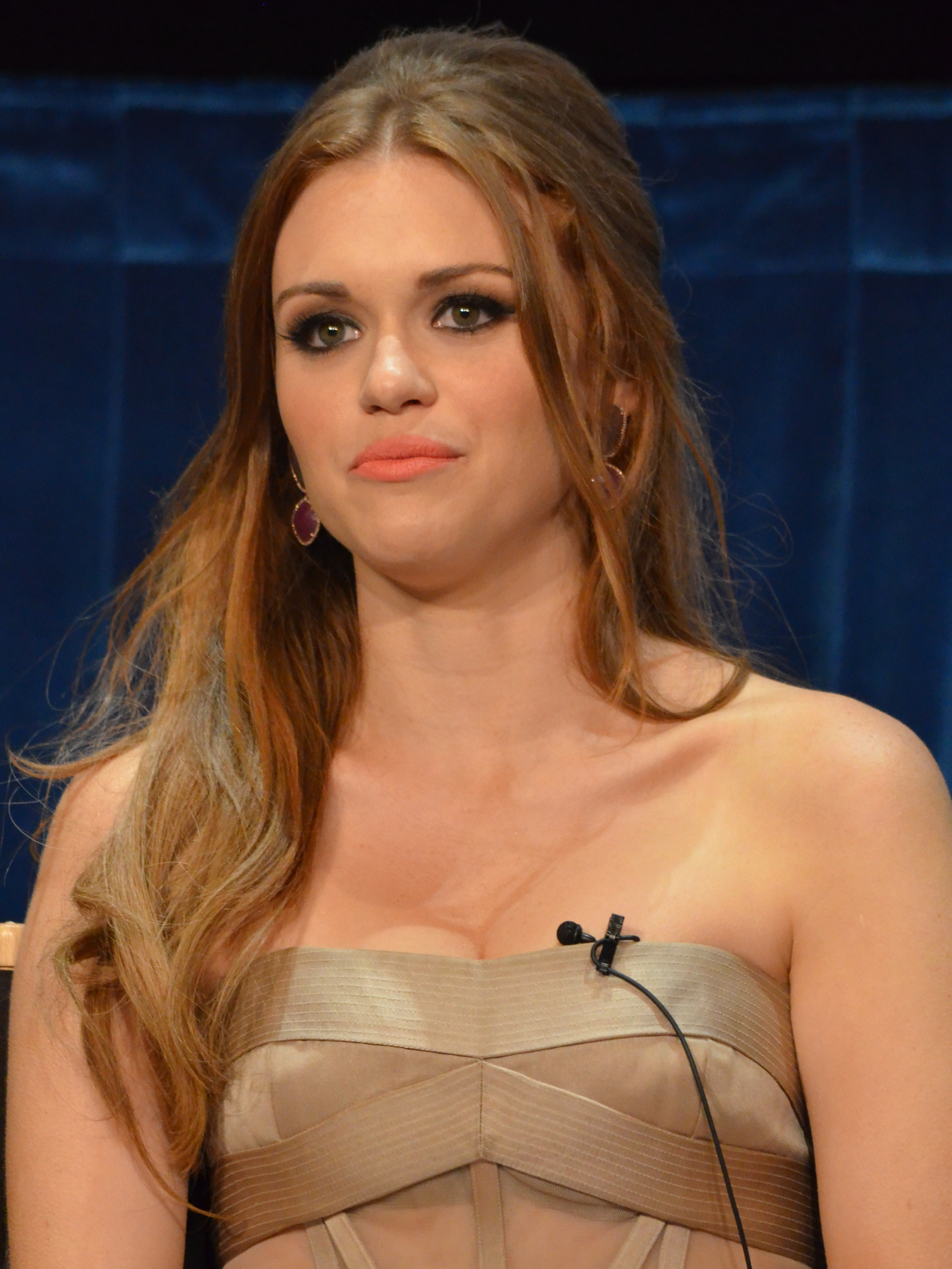
Holland Roden
(Lydia Martin)

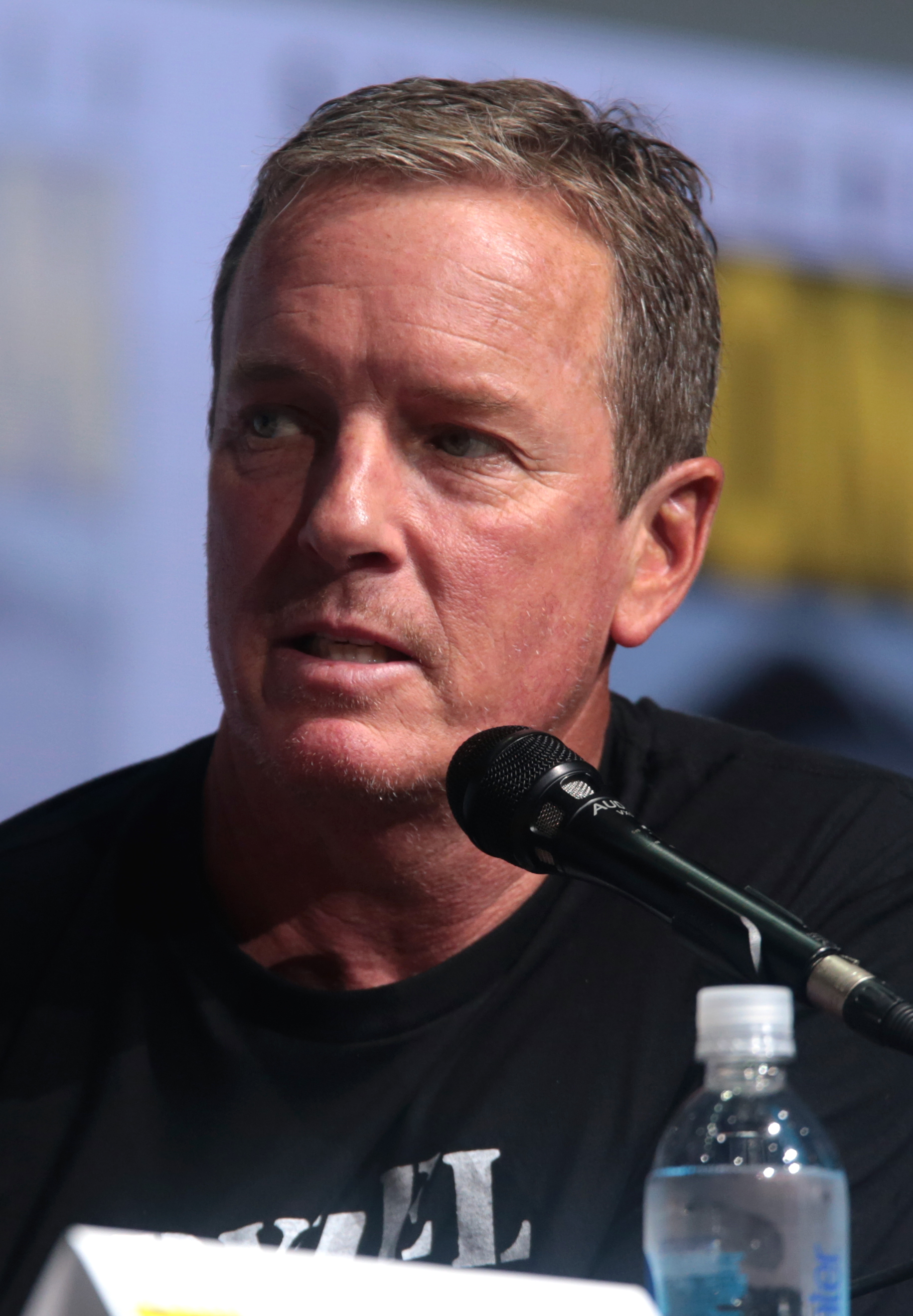
Linden Ashby
(Sheriff Stilinski)

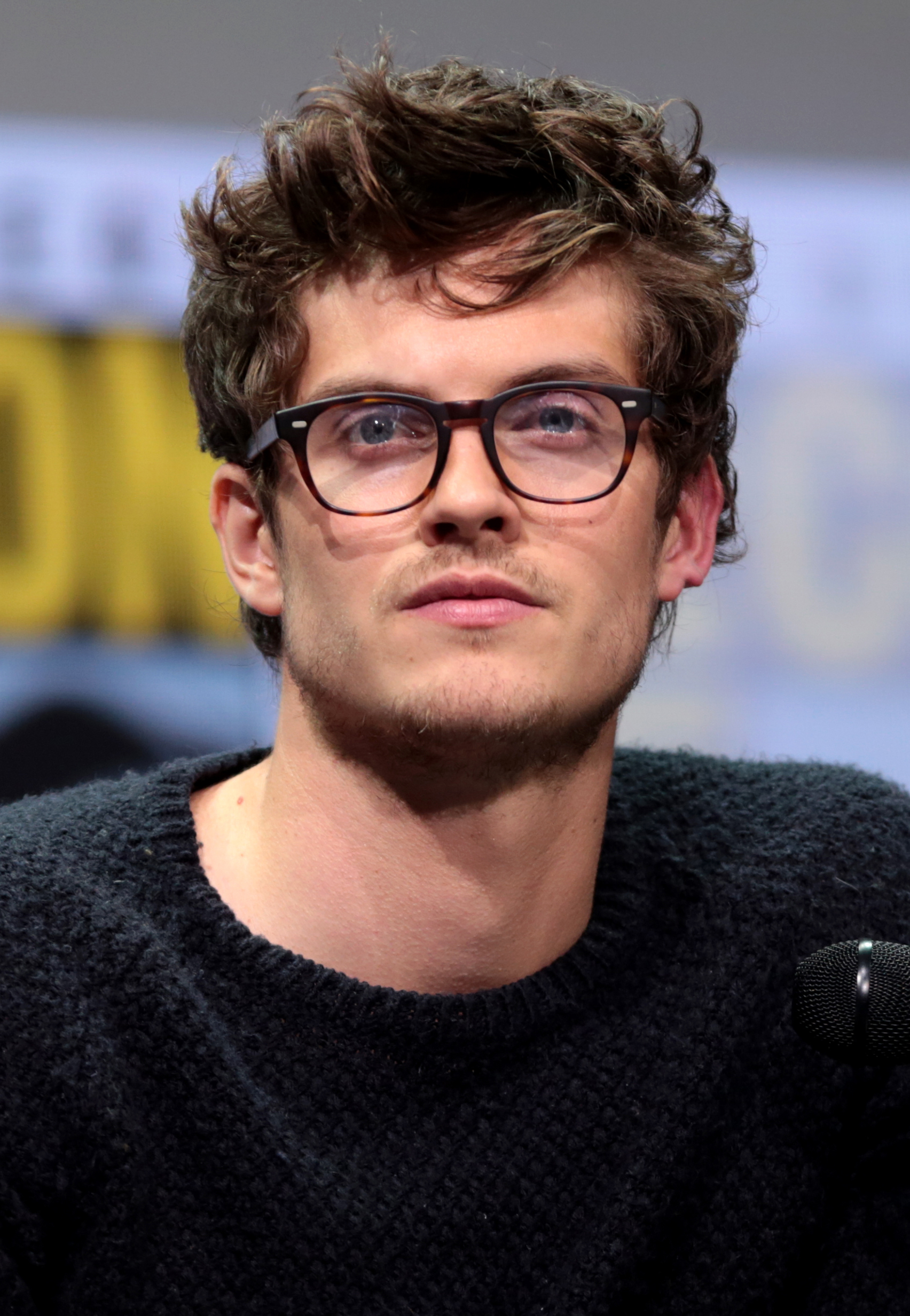
Daniel Sharman
(Isaac Lahey)

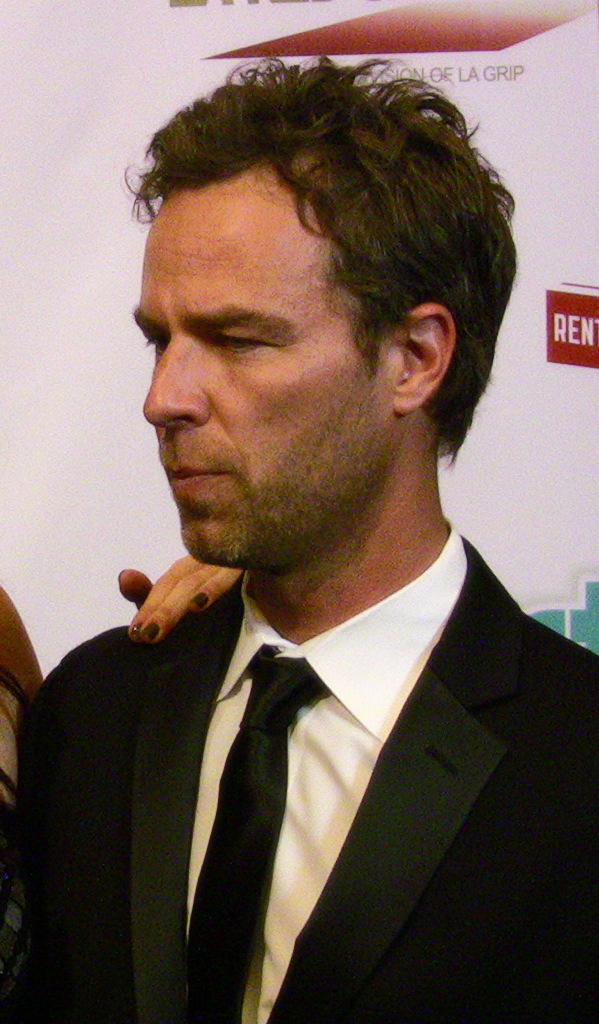
JR Bourne
(Chris Argent)

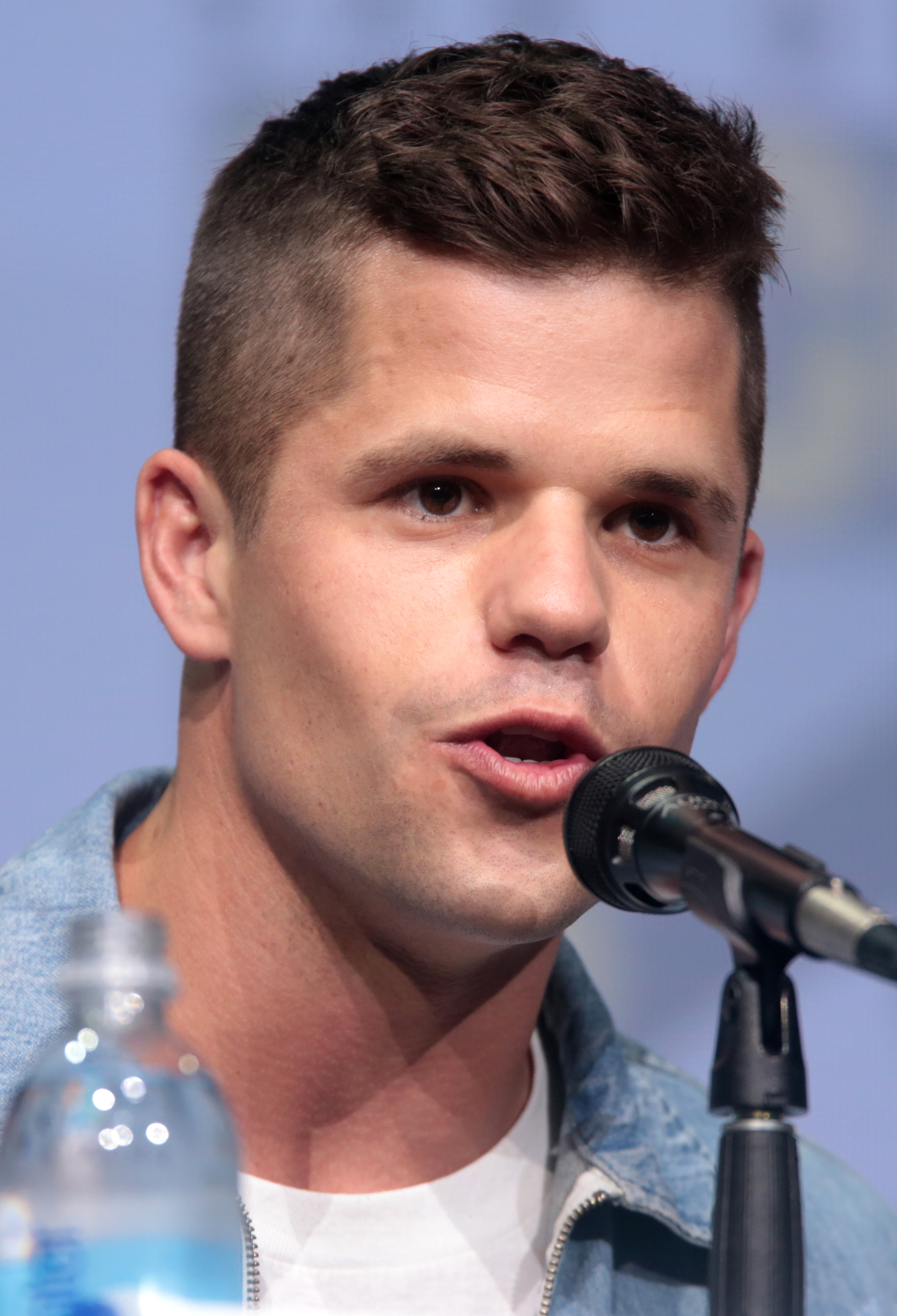
Charlie Carver
(Ethan)

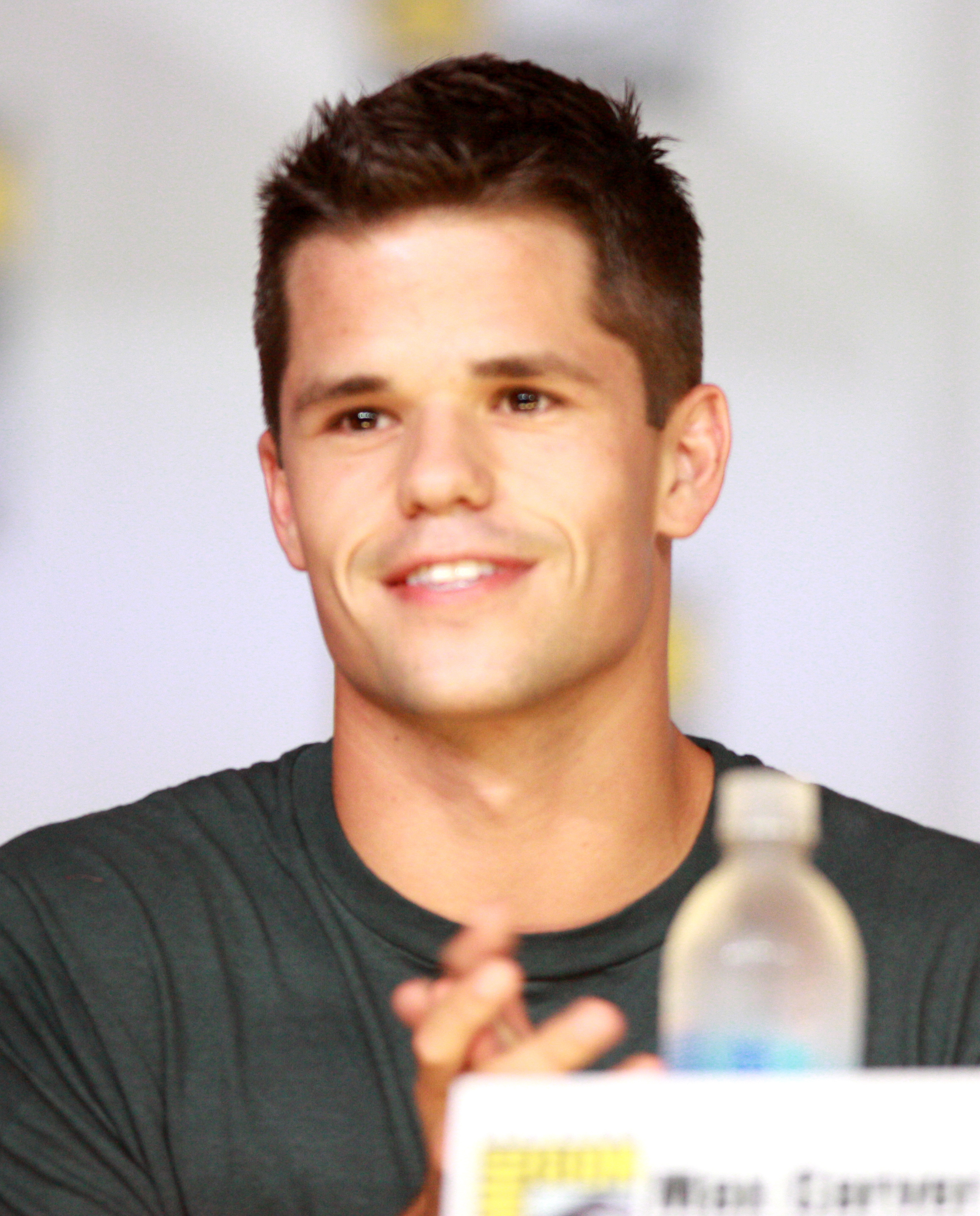
Max Carver
(Aiden)

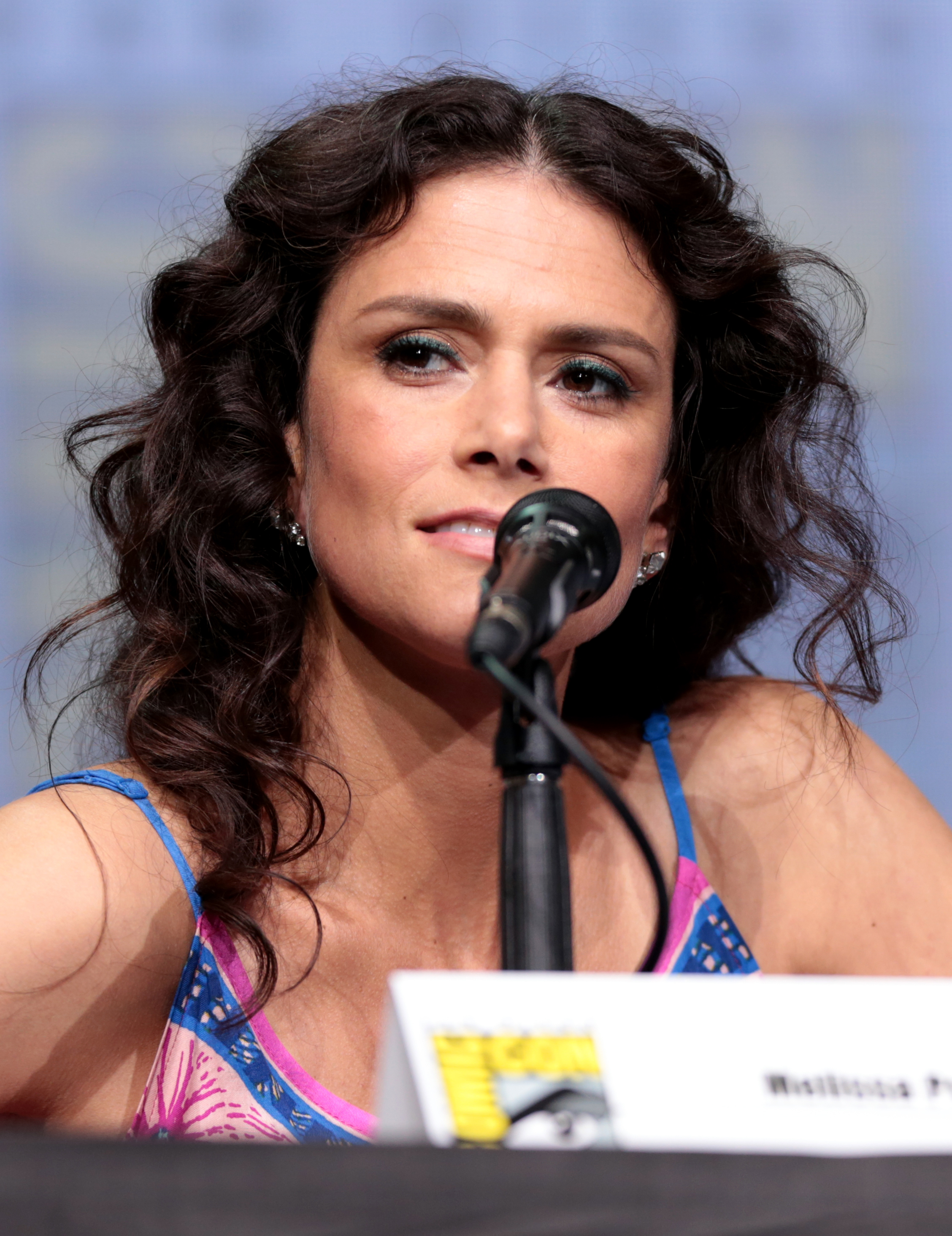
Melissa Ponzio
(Melissa McCall)

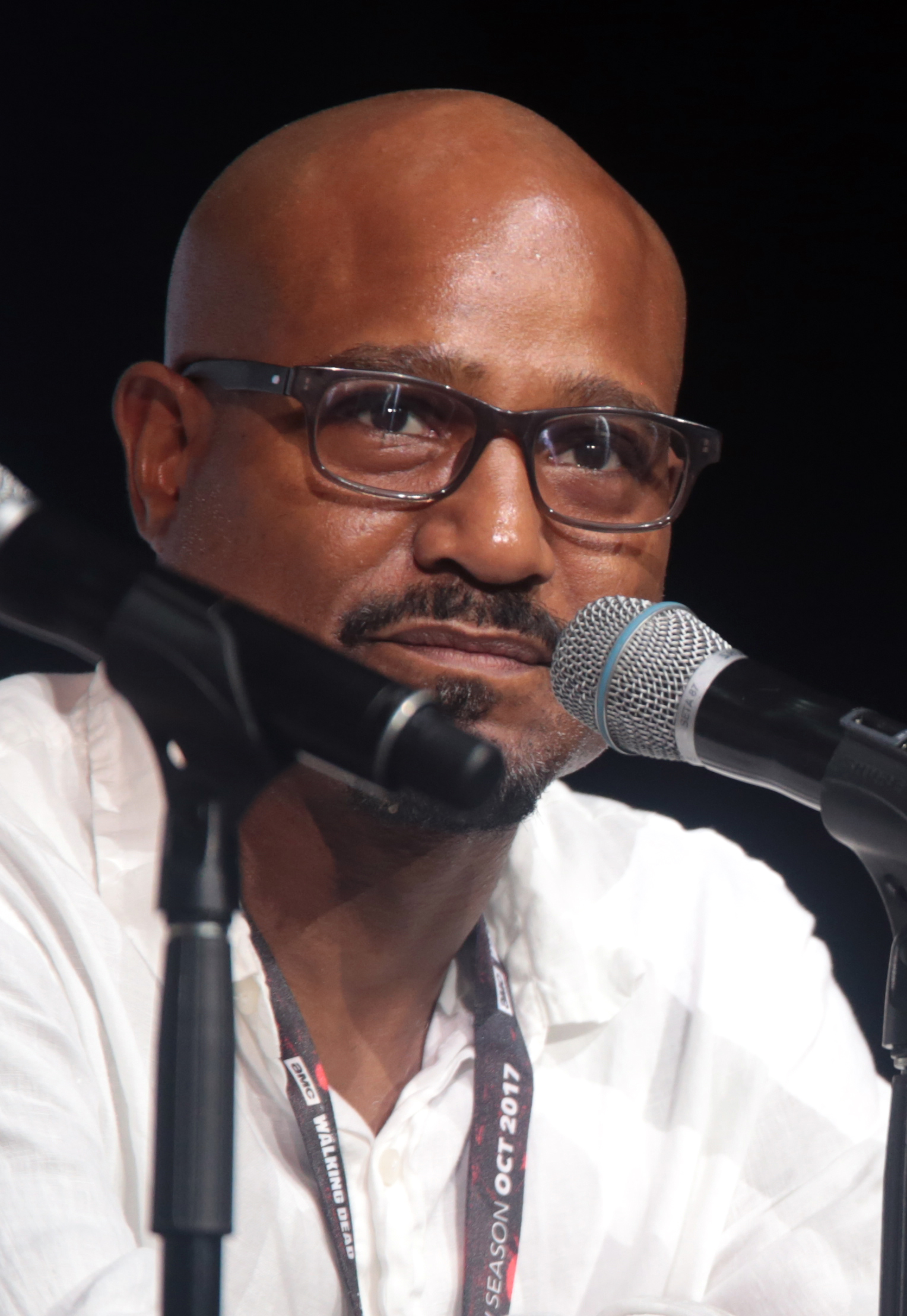
Seth Gilliam
(Alan Deaton)

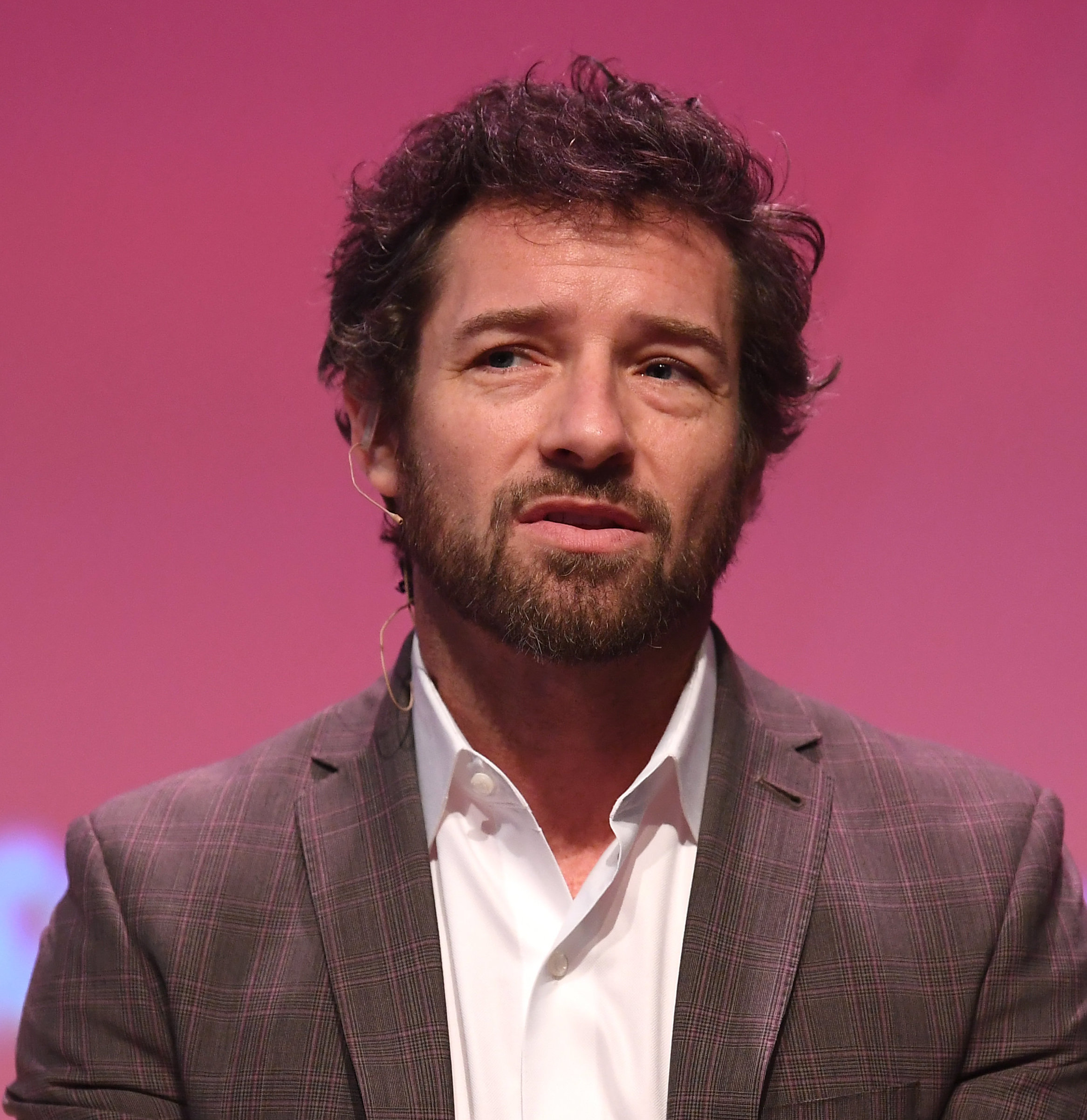
Ian Bohen
(Peter Hale)

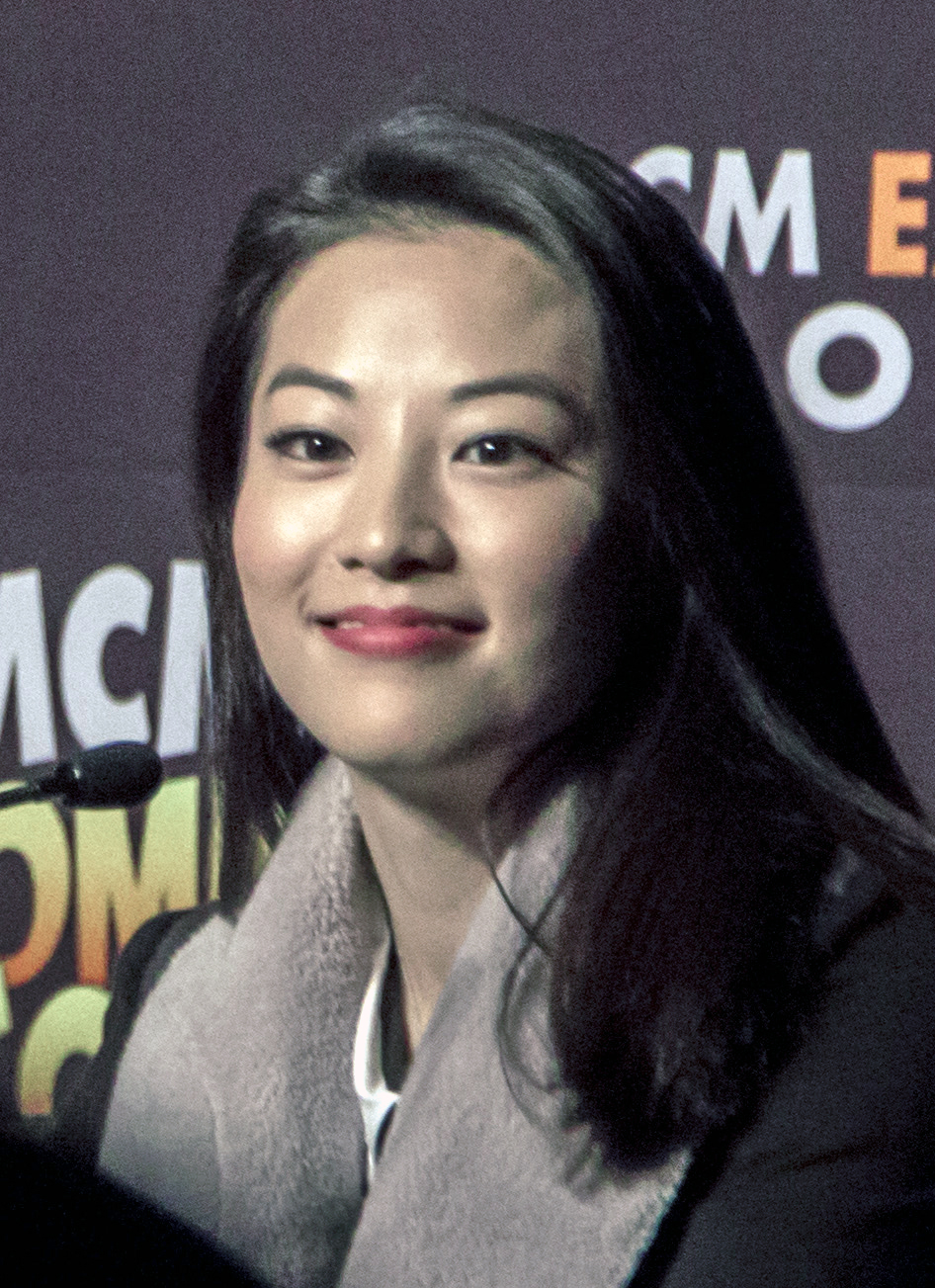
Arden Cho
(Kira Yukimura)

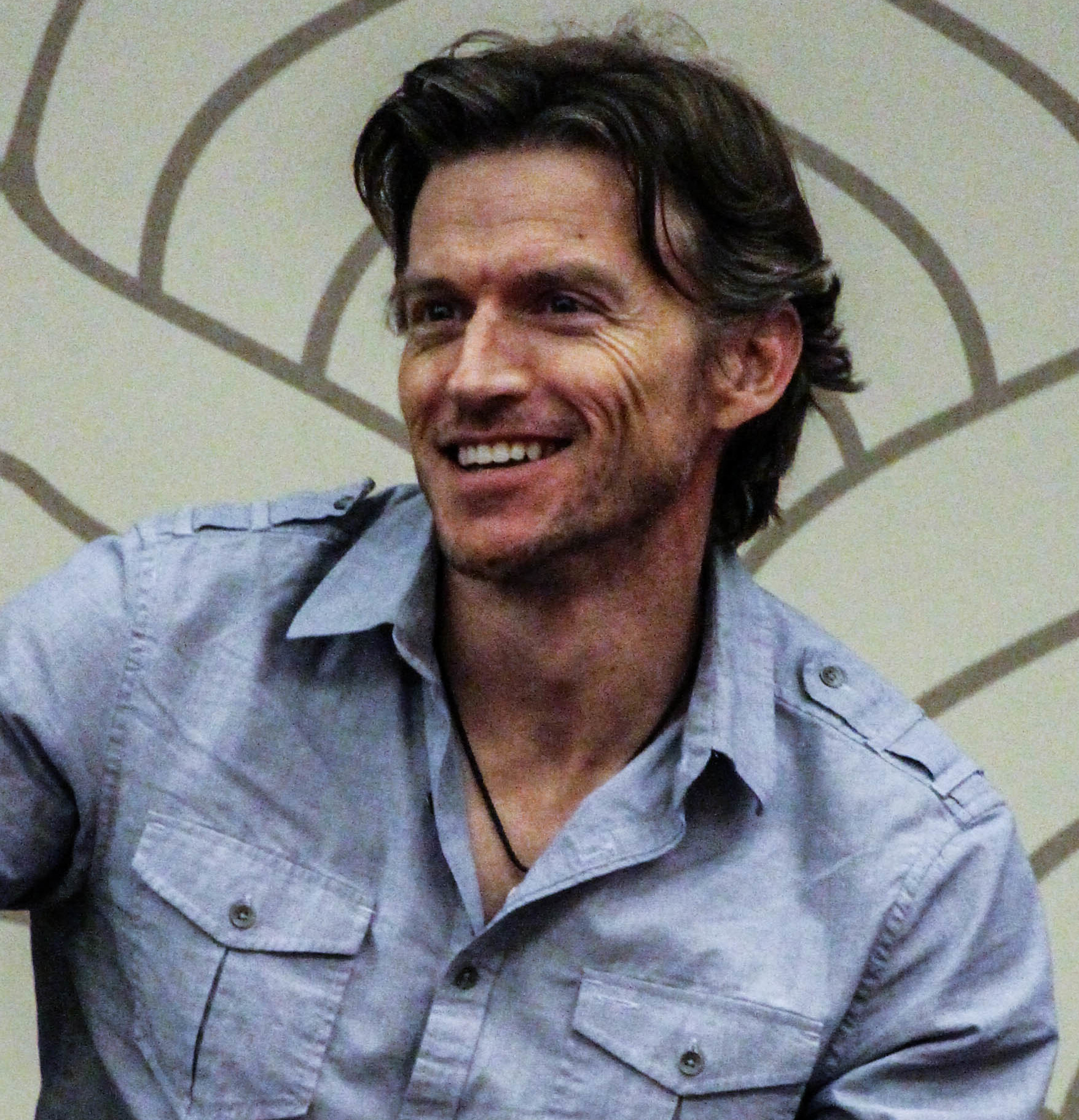
Gideon Emery
(Deucalion)

=== Main ===
- Tyler Posey as Scott McCall
- Crystal Reed as Allison Argent
- Dylan O'Brien as Stiles Stilinski
- Tyler Hoechlin as Derek Hale
- Holland Roden as Lydia Martin

=== Recurring ===
- Linden Ashby as Sheriff Stilinski
- Daniel Sharman as Isaac Lahey
- J. R. Bourne as Chris Argent
- Charlie Carver as Ethan Steiner
- Max Carver as Aiden Steiner
- Melissa Ponzio as Melissa McCall
- Seth Gilliam as Alan Deaton
- Ian Bohen as Peter Hale
- Keahu Kahuanui as Danny Mahealani
- Arden Cho as Kira Yukimura / young Noshiko Yukimura
- Matthew Del Negro as Rafael McCall
- Adelaide Kane as Cora Hale
- Gideon Emery as Deucalion
- Haley Webb as Jennifer Blake / Julia Baccari
- Felisha Terrell as Kali
- Orny Adams as Bobby Finstock
- Sinqua Walls as Vernon Boyd
- Tom Choi as Ken Yukimura
- Tamlyn Tomita as Noshiko Yukimura
- Bianca Lawson as Marin Morrell
- Brian Patrick Wade as Ennis
- Ryan Kelley as Deputy Parrish
- Aaron Hendry as the Nogitsune
- Mieko Hillman as Tara Graeme
- Shelley Hennig as Malia Tate
- Jill Wagner as Kate Argent
- Gage Golightly as Erica Reyes
- Eaddy Mays as Victoria Argent
- Shantal Nyree Rhodes as Danielle
- Ivo Nandi as Severo Calavera
- Maya Eshet as Meredith Walker
- Ivonne Coll as Araya Calavera
- Aaron Hendry as Brunski
- Todd Stashwick as Henry Tate
- Doug Jones as William Barrow
- Geno Segers as Kincaid
- Alicia Coppola as Talia Hale
- Meagan Tandy as Braeden

== Episodes ==
No. overall	No. in season	Title	Directed by	Written by	Original release date	US viewers (millions)
Part 1
25	1	"Tattoo"	Russell Mulcahy	Jeff Davis	June 3, 2013	2.36
Isaac is rescued from the Alpha pack by a mystery girl, but has amnesia about where he has been. Jackson has moved to London. Allison and her father have given up werewolf hunting, and Scott has been working on improving himself over the summer. Derek has been searching for Boyd and Erica, who were captured by the Alpha pack. Something eerie is causing the animals of Beacon Hills to go insane, and Dr. Deaton concludes that the animals are killing themselves intentionally. Derek gives Scott the tattoo he has been wanting to get, and explains about the Alpha pack's leader, Deucalion, who is blind but the strongest and most lethal.
26	2	"Chaos Rising"	Russell Mulcahy	Jeff Davis	June 10, 2013	2.11
Stiles' childhood friend, Heather, is attacked and goes missing. The guys help Isaac recover his memory, and it is revealed that he had found Boyd and another female werewolf being kept in an abandoned bank vault. However, Erica may already have been killed. When Derek and Scott break in to save them, Derek recognizes the other female werewolf as his younger sister Cora, presumed killed in the Hale house fire. Stiles and Peter discover that Boyd and Cora had been kept from transforming for 3 months. Wild and bloodthirsty, Boyd and Cora almost kill Derek and Scott until Allison saves them by setting the wolves free.
27	3	"Fireflies"	Tim Andrew	Lucas Sussman	June 17, 2013	1.67
Scott reveals to Allison that her mother tried to kill him. Derek discovers Erica's body. Derek, Isaac, and Scott seek Argent's help to capture Boyd and Cora before they kill someone. Lydia finds a dead boy and calls Stiles for help. The guys trap Boyd and Cora in the high school's boiler room but realize a teacher, Jennifer, is inside; Derek saves her. Stiles comes face to face with Heather's body in the morgue, killed the same way the boy was. As the two were both virgins, Stiles concludes that someone is murdering them as sacrifices, just as Sheriff Stilinski discovers a third dead girl, killed the same way.
28	4	"Unleashed"	Tim Andrew	Alyssa Clark & Jesec Griffin	June 24, 2013	1.91
The body of the newest murder victim is found. The Alphas attack Derek, and Deucalion offers him a proposition: join the Alpha pack by killing his own Betas and absorbing their power. Stiles, Lydia and Deaton figure out that the serial killer is a Darach, a dark or evil druid. Mr. Harris is murdered next, though he seemed to know the killer. Derek, aware that Deucalion wants him to kill his pack, kicks Isaac out, so Isaac moves in with Scott.
29	5	"Frayed"	Robert Hall	Angela L. Harvey	July 1, 2013	1.63
The Beacon Hills cross-country team is on a bus heading to a cross-country meet; Allison and Lydia are not far behind, to keep an eye on Scott. Scott is suffering from a wound that is not healing – the result of a pre-emptive strike on the Alphas the night before. As far as everyone can tell, Derek is dead; Scott feels responsible. The Alphas force Deaton to treat a wounded Ennis. In private, however, Deucalion kills Ennis to absorb his power. Allison stitches up Scott's wound, allowing him to finally heal. Back in Beacon Hills, Jennifer is startled when a wounded Derek appears and passes out.
30	6	"Motel California"	Christian Taylor	Christian Taylor	July 8, 2013	1.86
The team takes refuge at an eerie motel for the night, where Scott and the gang undergo strange experiences. Boyd, Ethan, and Scott suffer various hallucinations that drive them to attempt suicide, while Isaac is triggered into a PTSD flashback. All four werewolves are saved by Stiles and Lydia. They figure out that this was the Darach's doing – using the wolves as sacrifices. Jennifer helps Derek heal when they have sex. Argent visits Gerard to ask him which werewolf it was that bit his uncle in 1977, forcing him to commit suicide. Gerard reveals that it was Deucalion.
31	7	"Currents"	Russell Mulcahy	Jeff Davis	July 15, 2013	1.82
Danny is hospitalized; Scott's mother saves him. After taking two ER doctors from Beacon Hills hospital, the Darach targets Deaton as the next sacrifice. Deucalion warns Scott that either Deaton or Derek will die tonight. Stiles tries various divination methods with Lydia to get answers. Boyd and Isaac's plan to defeat the Alphas targeting Derek does not work, and Kali forces Derek to fight her one-on-one by holding Jennifer hostage. Scott and his friends deduce where Deaton's being held. The Alphas attack Derek while Scott saves Deaton, with Sheriff Stilinski's help. Kali forces Boyd onto Derek's extended claws, killing him. Deaton tells Scott he showed signs of being a "True Alpha" – a werewolf who rises to Alpha status purely on "strength of character, by virtue, by sheer force of will". Deaton thinks that Deucalion might actually be after Scott, rather than Derek.
32	8	"Visionary"	Russell Mulcahy	Jeff Davis	July 22, 2013	1.78
Seeking answers, Stiles and Cora listen as Peter tells them about werewolf eye color – they change from yellow to blue when that werewolf first takes an innocent life. Peter tells them about a teenaged Derek, who fell in love with Paige. When the plan to turn her, to ensure they will always be together, failed, Derek was forced to kill her to end her suffering. Peter leaves out that turning her was his idea, and that he asked Ennis to do the biting. Elsewhere, Scott and Allison visit Gerard, whose pain Scott helps alleviate in exchange for answers. Gerard explains the origins of the feud between the Hunters and the werewolves, but leaves out that Deucalion had originally wanted peace – Gerard was the one who sabotaged a meeting between the two sides, before blinding a vulnerable Deucalion. Dr. Deaton and Ms. Morrell are revealed to be emissaries – modern day druids, advisors to Alphas and ambassadors between werewolves and humans.
33	9	"The Girl Who Knew Too Much"	Tim Andrew	Jeff Davis	July 29, 2013	1.77
Allison and Isaac learn that the Darach is planning to sacrifice guardians next, they think that her father is involved with the murders, but end up discovering that he has been tracking the Darach for a while now. Scott and Stiles want to use Lydia to solve the murders. Lydia discovers that Jennifer Blake is the Darach; Jennifer is about to kill her, when Lydia screams and she realizes that Lydia is actually a banshee, aka "the Wailing Woman"; this explains her attraction and inclination towards the supernatural. Stiles' father tries to save Lydia, but is kidnapped by Jennifer, as he is a guardian. Scott goes to Ms. Morrell for some guidance; Morrell reveals that Deucalion's plan for him is that either Scott will join the Alpha Pack willingly as a True Alpha, or Deucalion will force Scott to kill, destroying his potential to become a True Alpha.
34	10	"The Overlooked"	Russell Mulcahy	Jeff Davis	August 5, 2013	1.97
After Jennifer takes Sheriff Stilinski, Derek and Scott capture her and bring her to the hospital in order to save Cora's life, where they are trapped by the Alphas. It is then revealed that Jennifer is in fact Kali's former emissary and that the Alphas want her dead. With the help of Peter, Allison, Argent, Stiles, and Isaac, they manage to fight against the Alphas and escape, but Jennifer kidnaps Scott's mother, since she is a guardian. Feeling that there is no other way, Scott joins Deucalion to find Jennifer, who promises to help find his mother and Stiles's father in return.
35	11	"Alpha Pact"	Tim Andrew	Jeff Davis	August 12, 2013	1.91
After escaping the Alphas, Derek and Peter try to find a way to save Cora, while Allison, Isaac, and Stiles discover that Jennifer has named Argent as her last sacrifice. Sacrificing himself to save Allison, Argent hands himself over to Jennifer. The group discover that Jennifer is holding her victims in the root cellar. Scott and the Alpha pack hunt down Ms. Morrell; Deucalion injures her with the blade in his cane. Peter tells Derek that as an Alpha, he can heal one of his own, even at the brink of death. Choosing family over power, Derek heals Cora, losing his Alpha powers in the process. Stiles and Deaton find Scott and convince him that they need to be 'temporarily' dead in order to find out where their parents are. Scott, Allison, and Stiles are then put into tubs of ice and pushed down.
36	12	"Lunar Ellipse"	Russell Mulcahy	Jeff Davis	August 19, 2013	2.08
Scott, Allison, and Stiles awaken and discover where the Nemeton is located. Jennifer kills Kali and badly wounds the twins. Allison, Isaac, and Stiles locate the Nemeton and rescue the three parents. The lunar eclipse begins, and all the werewolves become powerless. Jennifer gives Deucalion his sight back so he can see her true form and then tries to kill him, but is stopped by Derek. Jennifer attacks Derek, but the eclipse ends and the werewolves' power returns. Scott defeats Jennifer and becomes a True Alpha. Deucalion slashes Jennifer's throat, apparently killing her. Jennifer is revealed to be barely alive, having survived Deucalion's attack, but is confronted by Peter. Peter kills her, claiming that he has always been the Alpha.
Part 2
37	13	"Anchors"	Russell Mulcahy	Jeff Davis	January 6, 2014	2.43
As a result of their "temporary deaths", Scott, Stiles, and Allison are now experiencing vivid hallucinations. Allison is haunted by visions of Kate, her dead aunt; Stiles has terrible nightmares and is unable to read even when awake; and Scott has begun to see his shadow as that of an Alpha werewolf. Scott befriends a new student named Kira Yukimura, whose father has become the new history teacher at Beacon Hills High School. Overhearing a discussion involving the recent psychological problems that Scott, Stiles and Allison have been having, Kira identifies the condition as a spiritual state known as Bardo, the final stage of which ends in the death of the person afflicted. Scott and Stiles search a crime scene of the reopened case for clues, finding a coyote whose eyes glow blue. Scott believes the coyote is one of the family members presumed dead, a girl named Malia. Derek and Peter are shown being tortured by electricity.
38	14	"More Bad Than Good"	Tim Andrew	Jeff Davis	January 13, 2014	1.91
Derek and Peter's captors want information about a female wolf. Scott and his friends attempt to track down the were-coyote Malia before her father kills her, in order to change her back to a human. Isaac becomes caught in a coyote trap, while Stiles saves Lydia from another trap. Allison uses a tranquillizer dart to sedate Malia's father. Scott tracks down Malia and embraces his Alpha powers in order to transform Malia back into a human with an Alpha roar, which also gives Isaac the strength to break the trap on his leg. Sheriff Stilinski then reunites Malia with her father. Stiles discovers that he has regained the ability to read. Peter and Derek are freed from their captors by an unlikely ally, Braeden, who reveals that she was hired to free them by Deucalion. At the Nemeton, someone releases a swarm of fireflies that morph into three mysterious figures.
39	15	"Galvanize"	Robert Hall	Eoghan O'Donnell	January 20, 2014	2.00
William Barrow, an electrical engineer turned mass murderer, escapes during a surgery at the hospital and hides out in the school. He abducts Kira, takes her to a power plant and attempts to electrocute her, but she inexplicably deflects the electricity, killing Barrow and shutting down the power for the entire town. Just after the blackout, five hooded figures attack Isaac.
40	16	"Illuminated"	Russell Mulcahy	Alyssa Clark	January 27, 2014	1.87
Isaac describes the hooded figures that attacked him to Allison and her father, who recognizes the description and asks for 24 hours. Kira reveals to Scott that her body emanates a glowing aura when a photo is taken of her, and with the help of Stiles, the two break into the Sheriff's office and erase similar photos from Kira's cell phone. Danny and Ethan throw a Halloween party in Derek's empty loft. During the party, Scott realizes that Kira's "aura" resembles a fox, and Allison discovers what appears to be a reverse number "5" mark behind Isaac's ear. Ethan, Derek and Lydia are also attacked by the hooded figures and marked the same way. Stiles discovers that his handwriting matches the coded message written on the chalk-board, instructing Barrow to kill Kira.
41	17	"Silverfinger"	Jennifer Lynch	Moira McMahon Leeper	February 3, 2014	2.26
Allison's father recounts his time in Japan when he was eighteen; he and members of the Japanese yakuza encountered the hooded figures, which are revealed to be called Oni. He, Allison and Isaac plan to infiltrate the lair of the only other survivor, a man called Katashi in order to gain answers. Kira reveals to Scott her research into her supernatural heritage: she's a Kitsune. Worrying about his sanity, Stiles seeks help from Melissa. She sedates him so that he can finally sleep and discovers that his symptoms are identical to those of his deceased mother, Claudia. Scott, Kira, Derek, the twins, Melissa, and Agent McCall take sanctuary in Scott's home just before the Oni attack. The Oni are forced out of the house by a mountain ash barrier. Katashi warns Argent to let the Oni destroy the Nogitsune as they are only after someone who is not themselves (possessed by a dark spirit). The Oni breach Scott's house, but do not harm him or Kira. However, his dad is stabbed in the process. Stiles awakens and is confronted by the Oni, but he destroys one of them. When Scott finds him, Stiles has no memory of what happened.
42	18	"Riddled"	Tim Andrew	Christian Taylor	February 10, 2014	2.09
Stiles makes a panicked late-night phone call to Scott after he finds himself in a strange location with his leg in a steel trap. Lydia leads them to the mental health center where Barrow was committed, however Stiles is not there. Scott's mother and father find Stiles, who had been sleepwalking. Derek and Kira find Stiles's baseball bat at the power station, and Derek deduces that Kira was indirectly responsible for the Nogitsune taking over Stiles's body. Stiles has an MRI scan to test for frontotemporal dementia, the same illness that caused his mother's death. The power then goes out, due to the Nogitsune having damaged the wiring on the roof the previous night. The Nogitsune, now in complete control of Stiles's body, confronts the remaining Oni, who are revealed to be led by Kira's mother. A charged high voltage cable falls out from the hospital roof on top of Kira.
43	19	"Letharia Vulpina"	Russell Mulcahy	Jeff Davis	February 17, 2014	2.12
Deaton retrieves a poisonous plant that will aid him in defeating the Nogitsune. Derek Hale and Chris Argent are arrested by Agent McCall for the murder of Katashi after being framed by someone. Stiles, who is still missing, reappears in the school basement. After finding a map of the cross-country trails, he, Scott, Aiden and Ethan realize that the path has been booby trapped by Stiles. The boys are successful in stopping the runners from being injured but Coach Finstock is shot with an arrow. Allison and Lydia seek the aid of Peter Hale. He asks for Lydia's help in finding the memory that his sister took away from him. Lydia discovers that Peter is a father. The Oni, attack Stiles, Scott and Kira at the vet's office. They manage to escape but Stiles – still possessed by the Nogitsune – knocks Kira unconscious and stabs Scott. Deaton appears and uses the poison he found to subdue the Nogitsune.
44	20	"Echo House"	Tim Andrew	Jeff Davis	February 24, 2014	1.94
Stiles checks himself into Eichen House, a mental hospital. Argent and Deaton are working together. Deaton requires a hidden scroll in his quest to cure Stiles. In the mental hospital, Stiles encounters Malia Tate, who is not pleased to be reunited. After group therapy, Stiles is told that he must stay awake. Stiles enlists Malia in a plan to access the basement. Malia rescues Stiles and the two head to the basement together, where they share a passionate encounter. Soon after, Malia realizes that the wall with the kanji carved into it is hollow, and the Nogitsune lies behind it. The Nogitsune gives Stiles an ultimatum; allow it in or watch Malia die, and allows the Nogitsune to possess him again. Deaton reads the scroll and says that the Nogitsune's host body needs to change its form in order to remove it.
45	21	"The Fox and the Wolf"	Tim Andrew	Ian Stokes	March 3, 2014	2.06
Kira learns that her mother is actually a Kitsune who is close to 900 years old. During the second world war, she was in a Japanese internment camp, and fell in love with a young medic. A riot breaks out, and the medic is badly burned by a molotov cocktail thrown. Noshiko, assumed to be dead but actually healing and unable to move, calls upon a Nogitsune to possess her so that she can have her revenge, but it possesses her lover's body instead. Kira, as a Thunder Kitsune, is able to mend the broken katana, and her mother gives it to her to stop the Nogitsune once again. Noshiko reveals that she hid the Nogitsune in the roots of the nemeton, meaning that Scott and his friends may have been responsible for the reawakening of the Nogitsune. Derek, Argent, Allison and Sheriff Stilinski try to track down Stiles, hoping to bring him back to normal.
46	22	"De-Void"	Christian Taylor	Jeff Davis	March 10, 2014	1.80
Sheriff Stilinski faces a review board, but Scott's father saves his job at the last minute. Mr. McCall reveals to Sheriff Stilinski that he only came back to Beacon Hills to make amends with his son. Kira stays at Scott's house after learning that her mother has been lying to her and that leads to Scott and Kira sharing an intimate kiss. The Nogitsune stabs himself and releases a swarm of flies, sending them after Aiden, Ethan, Isaac and Derek Having been placed under the spell of the Nogitsune, Derek tries to get revenge over Argent, by covering him in gasoline and attempting to burn him; however Argent is able to free himself. Aiden, Ethan, and Isaac nearly kill each other but are saved by Kira and Allison. With guidance from Peter, Scott and Lydia are able to enter Stiles's mind, and manage to free Stiles from the Nogitsune's control. However, Lydia is kidnapped by the Nogitsune, which is now independent and looks exactly like Stiles.
47	23	"Insatiable"	Tim Andrew	Jeff Davis	March 17, 2014	2.00
While searching for Lydia in the woods, Aiden and Ethan are shot at by an unknown shooter with wolfsbane bullets, and are saved by Derek. Kira's mother tries to teach her the board game that Stiles was playing with the Nogitsune. Later, Kira's father discovers that the Nogitsune and Kira's mother play the game the same way. Lydia is taken to the internment camp by the Nogitsune; the group arrive and find Kira's mother and the Oni, who plans to kill the Nogitsune. The Nogitsune takes possession over the Oni and has them face off against Kira, Allison, and Isaac, while Scott and Stiles find Lydia and are shocked when she asks why they came when she told them not to. Allison manages to kill one of the Oni and is stabbed by another. Allison professes her love to Scott and dies in his arms.
48	24	"The Divine Move"	Russell Mulcahy	Jeff Davis	March 24, 2014	2.26
The Oni, under the control of the Nogitsune, systematically and violently take control of the hospital, Sheriff's station, high school and Alan's animal clinic. Isaac and Mr. Argent realize that silver can actually destroy the Oni. Everyone shows signs of the poisoning seen in others attacked by the Oni. But Scott, Kira, Stiles and Lydia defeat the Nogitsune by realizing the attacks are an illusion. Scott bites the Nogitsune, following the instructions on the scroll stating that it cannot be both a fox and a wolf. The duplicate of Stiles that the Nogitsune was using as a body disintegrates, and Isaac traps the Nogitsune in a box made of Nemeton wood. Lydia then gets a feeling and runs outside to find that Aiden has been stabbed and now is lying dead in the arms of Ethan, his twin brother. Later, the injured people start healing and all seems well again in Beacon Hills. In a series of flashbacks, it is revealed that Kate Argent, whose throat was torn out by Peter's claws, is shown to be alive and is a supernatural being.

== Production ==
Season 3 was filmed in two parts. Part 1 (or Season 3A) was filmed from December 3, 2012 and wrapped up on May 5, 2013. Part 2 (Season 3B) began filming on July 29, 2013, and wrapped up on December 19, 2013. Unlike the previous two seasons, which were shot in Atlanta, Georgia, this season was shot in Los Angeles, California.

Colton Haynes left the show, taking a role on the CW series Arrow. MTV also released the first page of the first episode from season three, which is set about four months after the end of season two, and Jackson's absence was addressed within the context of the beginning of the season. On October 2, 2012 an open casting call website was set up to cast identical twins to play the identical twin alpha werewolves, Ethan and Aiden.

On November 28, 2012, Teen Wolf announced five new additions to the cast for season 3. Former Desperate Housewives stars Charlie and Max Carver have been cast as twin alpha werewolves Ethan and Aiden. They are described as being "dangerous charmers with brilliant minds". Australian actress Adelaide Kane has been cast as Cora, Derek Hale's younger sister, a mysterious and beautiful young woman toughened by a life on her own after surviving the Hale House fire. Felisha Terrell from Days of Our Lives has been cast as female alpha Kali, while Gideon Emery has been cast as Deucalion, the leader of the Alpha pack. Described as having "an eloquent, cutting intelligence", the new werewolf will set a plan in motion to turn Derek and Scott against each other, ripping the Beacon Hills supernatural community apart at the seams. Brian Patrick Wade has been cast as Ennis, an alpha werewolf who is described as a "force of pure brutality". Haley Webb has been cast as Jennifer Blake, an English teacher at Beacon Hills High School and a new love interest of Derek Hale's.

Teen Wolf announced three new recurring characters for the second half of season 3. Arden Cho has been cast as Kira, an Asian-American character who has been described as a "new student and possible threat to Beacon Hills". Her character is confirmed to be a kitsune. Doug Jones has been cast as Barrow, a mass murderer, who made his appearance in episode "Galvanize". Ryan Kelley will be the newest member of the Beacon County Sheriff's Department in Teen Wolf Season 3 Part 2, he will assist Sheriff Stilinski in uncovering the mysterious supernatural occurrences that plague the murder-prone Northern California town before becoming part of the mystery himself. Additionally, Shelley Hennig was cast, with her role being kept secret until the winter season premiere.

Linden Ashby has stated that for the second part of Season 3, "This is a season of consequence. That every action has a reaction, has a consequence. And it's not always what you think it's gonna be."

During Season 3B production, Crystal Reed decided she "wanted to explore other avenues of film and TV" and move on from the show, and her character Allison Argent was killed off in the penultimate episode.

== Reception ==
The review aggregator website Rotten Tomatoes reported an approval rating of 88% and an average rating of 7.97/10 for the third season, based on 17 reviews. The website's critics consensus reads, "Beautifully shot and crafted, Teen Wolf delves into intellectual horror themes while staying true to the movie's original mythology."

== Awards and nominations ==
Year	Award	Category	Nominee(s)	Result
2013	Saturn Awards	Best Youth-Oriented Series on Television	Teen Wolf	Won
2013	Teen Choice Award	Choice Summer TV Show	Teen Wolf	Nominated
2013	Teen Choice Award	Choice Summer TV Star – Male	Tyler Posey	Won
2013	Young Hollywood Award	Best Ensemble	Tyler Posey; Crystal Reed; Dylan O'Brien; Tyler Hoechlin; Holland Roden	Won
2014	Saturn Awards	Best Youth-Oriented Series on Television	Teen Wolf	Won
2014	Teen Choice Awards	Choice Scene Stealer: Male	Tyler Hoechlin	Won
2014	Teen Choice Awards	Choice TV: Actor Sci-Fi/Fantasy	Tyler Posey	Nominated
2014	Teen Choice Awards	Choice TV: Sci-Fi/Fantasy Series	Teen Wolf	Nominated
2014	Teen Choice Awards	Choice TV: Villain	Dylan O'Brien	Won

== Home media ==
The third season was released in two parts: 3A was released on December 10, 2013, and 3B was released on June 17, 2014.
