= Eaddy =

Eaddy is a surname and a given name. Notable people with the name include:

- Don Eaddy (1934–2008), American baseball, football, and basketball player
- Tahj Eaddy (born 1996), American basketball player
- Eaddy Mays, American actress and producer
