= WXKT =

Variety hits radio station in Maysville, Georgia, United States

- Maysville, Georgia; United States
- Broadcast area: Gainesville, Georgia; Athens, Georgia
- Frequency: 103.7 MHz
- Branding: 103.7 Chuck FM

Programming
- Format: Adult hits
- Affiliations: Georgia Bulldogs

Ownership
- Owner: Cox Media Group; (Cox Radio, LLC)
- Sister stations: WNGC, WGAU, WGMG, WPUP, WRFC

History
- First air date: 1989 (as WBIC)
- Former call signs: WBIC (1989–1990); WPUP (1990–2008)

Technical information
- Licensing authority: FCC
- Facility ID: 3078
- Class: C3
- ERP: 4,100 watts
- HAAT: 250 m (820 ft)
- Transmitter coordinates: 34°22′39.00″N 83°39′35.00″W

Links
- Public license information: Public file; LMS
- Webcast: Listen Live
- Website: 1037chuckfm.com

WXKT (103.7 FM) is a radio station broadcasting an adult hits format as "103.7 Chuck FM". Licensed to Maysville, Georgia, it serves the Gainesville area and can generally be heard as far west as Doraville and as far south as Athens. It first began broadcasting in 1989 under the call sign WBIC. It is currently owned by Cox Radio. Its studios are located in Bogart, and its transmitter is in Lula, Georgia.

== History ==
103.7 FM was first assigned the call sign WBIC on January 4, 1989. On March 2, 1990, the call sign was then changed to WPUP. The station was known as "Rock 103.7" for many years, before returning to the "Bulldog" name it had in the mid to late 1990s. Since the transmitter is located in Royston, it made the station's signal south of Athens marginal.

The station was sold to Cox Radio in August 2008, which moved WPUP to 100.1 and changed 103.7 to the current callsign WXKT. The stations simulcast the "Bulldog" format for a little over a year; WPUP remains on 100.1 FM licensed to Watkinsville as top-40 station "Power 100.1".

On August 1, 2009 at 8 AM, WXKT flipped to news/talk.

Atlanta-based news/talk station WSB AM 750 upgraded to FM simulcast (WSBB-FM 95.5) in August 2010, which resulted in improved coverage in the Gainesville area; Cox deemed the news/talk format on 103.7 as redundant and on December 5, 2011, WXKT began stunting with a loop of Tone-Loc's "Wild Thing" and clips of University of Georgia football games, as well as redirecting listeners to WSB/WSBB. It was expected that the station would flip to sports talk.

On December 6, 2011 at 6 AM, "Wild Thing" ended and Tim Bryant announced a new format for 103.7: the mornings consisted of North Georgia's Morning News hosted by Tim Bryant and Martha Zoller's talk show; at noon, Jim Rome's sports radio show aired; 3-6 PM, America's Radio News handled programming; and Yahoo! Sports Radio did overnights.

On May 25, 2012 WXKT flipped from news/talk/sports to adult hits, branded as "103.7 Chuck FM".
