= WNGC =

Radio station in Arcade–Athens, Georgia

Coordinates: 34.378°N 83.660°W

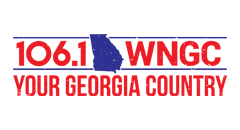

Arcade, Georgia; United States
- Broadcast area: Athens, Georgia
- Frequency: 106.1 MHz
- Branding: 106.1 WNGC

Programming
- Format: Country music
- Affiliations: United Stations Radio Networks

Ownership
- Owner: Cox Media Group; (Cox Radio, LLC)
- Sister stations: WGAU, WGMG, WPUP, WRFC, WXKT

History
- First air date: 1948 (as WGAU-FM at 99.5)
- Former call signs: WGAU-FM (1948–1968); WLET (1978–1985); WZLI (1985–1992); WLET (1992–1997); WSTE (1997–1999)
- Former frequencies: 99.5 MHz (1948–1957); 102.5 MHz (1957–1962); 95.5 MHz (1962–1999)
- Call sign meaning: "North Georgia Country"

Technical information
- Licensing authority: FCC
- Facility ID: 60810
- Class: C1
- ERP: 100,000 watts
- HAAT: 299 meters

Links
- Public license information: Public file; LMS
- Webcast: Listen Live
- Website: yourgeorgiacountry.com

WNGC (106.1 FM) is a radio station in North Georgia that plays country music; it was at 95.5 from 1968-1999. It is owned by Cox Media Group and is part of Cox Radio. Its city of license is Arcade with studios in Athens. Its transmitter is in Lula, Georgia.

== Station history ==
Prior to December 1996, 106.1 was light rock Mix 106 before switching to country and calling itself "South 106". In the spring of 1999, WSTE built a new tower because at the time they were still in competition with WNGC---just before the two stations would merge. The purpose of the deal was to try to reach a larger audience and give the two Atlanta country stations WKHX "Kicks" 101.5, and WYAY (Y106 at 106.7) some competition.The studios had moved from Toccoa to Gainesville and finally to Athens, but its signal was hard to pick up in the Atlanta area beyond Gwinnett.

While WNGC's city of license is Arcade, the transmitter is located in Lula (in northern Hall County). WNGC's 106.1 signal can be heard in northeast metro Atlanta, Greenville, South Carolina, and as far as Asheville, North Carolina, but the main coverage area is northeast Georgia and the Athens metro area (where the studios are located). Attempts were made in 2001 to move the transmitter to Sugar Hill, but those plans were scrapped.In July 2005 WNGC added former Kicks 101.5 morning host Moby and his syndicated morning show.

In January 2008, it was announced that WNGC was sold (along with sister stations WGMG, WPUP, WRFC, and WGAU) to Cox Radio in Atlanta. On March 7, 2008, WNGC started running ads inviting former Eagle 106.7 listeners to switch to 106.1 WNGC, as WYAY had become an oldies station. In February 2009, WNGC became an affiliate of the Motor Racing Network (MRN) and the Performance Racing Network (PRN), and began carrying coverage of NASCAR Sprint Cup Series racing on weekends.

On June 29, 2015, WNGC began simulcasting on WTSH-FM, rebranding as "106.1/107.1 Your Georgia Country".

On September 24, 2018, WNGC ended the simulcast with WTSH-FM, which switched to a simulcast of regional Mexican-formatted WLKQ 102.3 FM Buford.

The current morning show is Adam & Haley in the Morning. Adam Bomb came from Cumulus Top 40 WWWQ (Q100)

Pete De Graff is the Afternoon Drive Jock

=== Callsigns for 106.1 ===
- WLET 1978-1985
- WZLI 1985-1992
- WLET 1992-1997
- WSTE 1997-1999
- WNGC 1999-Now

=== Previous frequencies for WNGC ===
- 95.5 (as WGAU-FM 1962-1968, WNGC 1968-1999)
- 102.5 (as WGAU-FM 1957-1962)
- 99.5 (as WGAU-FM 1948-1957)

== Notable employees ==
- Paul Rea, former host of The Paul Rea Midday is News Director for multiple stations in the Oconee River Broadcasting Group

== The Georgia Bulldogs ==
WNGC-FM is the Flagship and one of many stations that carry The University of Georgia football games (along with sister WRFC), something it has done since 1991. Until 2005 WNGC was also the home of UGA men's basketball, which can now be heard on sister station WRFC and on 103.7, Chuck FM.

== Previous logo ==
(WNGC's logo under previous simulcast with WTSH)
