= WRFC (AM) =

- Athens, Georgia; United States
- Broadcast area: Athens metropolitan area
- Frequency: 960 kHz
- Branding: SportsRadio 960 The Ref

Programming
- Format: Sports
- Affiliations: ESPN Radio; Georgia Bulldogs Radio Network; Atlanta Braves Radio Network; Atlanta Falcons Radio Network

Ownership
- Owner: Cox Media Group; (Cox Radio, LLC)
- Sister stations: WNGC, WGAU, WGMG, WPUP, WXKT, WSB, WSBB-FM, WSB-FM, WSRV-FM, WALR-FM, WTSH-FM, WSB-TV

History
- First air date: May 1, 1948
- Call sign meaning: Robert Franklin Christian (father of original owner)

Technical information
- Licensing authority: FCC
- Facility ID: 1218
- Class: B
- Power: 5,000 watts day 2,500 watts night
- Transmitter coordinates: 33°59′58.00″N 83°26′0.00″W

Links
- Public license information: Public file; LMS
- Webcast: Listen Live
- Website: 960theref.com

WRFC (960 kHz) is a commercial AM radio station in Athens, Georgia. It airs a sports radio format, mostly using programming from ESPN Radio. Owned by Cox Media Group, the television and radio subsidiary of Cox Enterprises, the station is sister to radio stations WNGC, WGAU, WGMG, WPUP, WXKT and the WSB family of stations in nearby Atlanta. WRFC has studios in downtown Athens. The transmitter is located off West Vincent Drive in the North Valley neighborhood, northwest of Athens.

== Programming ==
WRFC features local sports shows during weekday morning and afternoon drive time, as well as a Georgia Bulldogs hour at noon. The rest of the schedule uses programming from ESPN Radio. The station carries University of Georgia sports, as well as Atlanta Braves baseball games and Atlanta Falcons football games.

== History ==
On May 1, 1948, WRFC first signed on the air. It was originally owned by L. H. Christian, with the call sign chosen for his father, Robert Franklin Christian. The station began as a 1,000-watt daytimer, required to go off the air at night. The studios were at 279 1/2 North Lumpkin Street, in Athens.

WRFC later operated for many years at 5,000 watts non-directional daytime and 500 watts directional nighttime using a three tower array northeast of Athens, with studios in an impressive mansion in downtown Athens. It featured 4 full service formats throughout its history, such as Top 40, middle of the road, and adult contemporary formats of popular music, news, and sports.

On February 20, 1971, NORAD broadcast a normal required weekly test of the Emergency Broadcast System. However, AT&T reported that the U.S. Air Force used the wrong tape by accident, initiating an Emergency Action Notification, normally issued by the president. It prompted all north Georgia radio stations by order of the FCC to operate under emergency procedures and feed the broadcast from primary station 750 WSB in Atlanta through their transmitters. Everett Langford was at the microphone at WRFC and had no idea what had happened. He listened to WSB but heard no emergency announcements. He was attempting to call the owner, L.H. Christian, when he heard the corrected message from the Air Force. Listeners could hear in his voice that he was very relieved it was only a mistake.

In 1981, WRFC dropped its Top 40 format and went into a short-lived MOR format, which did not last long. WRFC dropped MOR and went into adult contemporary in 1982. During this time WRFC adopted the moniker Stereo One, when it became the first-in-Georgia, and one of the first in the US AM Stereo radio stations with upgraded transmitting equipment. Though the format was short-lived, WRFC was also one of the first stations to use Compact Discs when that recorded media format debuted. When 1993 rolled along, the station began adding talk programs and sports programming from ESPN, although their adult contemporary format remained in place until the station dropped adult contemporary a year later in 1994.

In January 2008, WRFC was sold (along with sister stations WGMG, WPUP, WNGC, and WGAU) to Cox Radio in Atlanta. Southern Broadcasting of Athens and associated owners continue as a wholly owned subsidiary of Cox.

== Former on-air staff ==
- John Holliman (news, later with CNN) (deceased)
- Bill Hartman (sports and news)
- Johnny Jay (real name: Howard Toole)
- Larry Melear (1965–75) (was also chief engineer 1965–70 and 1971–75) (deceased)
- Jim Byard (1968 -1970)
- Tom Collins (1968 - 1971)
- Earl Pledger (1969–71)
- Everett Langford (1967–71) (was also chief engineer 1970–71)
- Ed Thilenius (sports)
- A.O. "Red" Healan
- Kate Murphy (Kathleen Emerson-Lambert)
- Jim Koger
- Morris "Night Owl" Knight
- Larry Johnson
- Charles Pinckney
- Craig Williams
- Jim Powell
- Chris Jones (sports and news 1970-1974)
- Bob Burton (news)
- Phil Scoggins (sports and news)
- Garry Glenn (sports and news)
- Tony McVeigh (news)
- Andrew McElhannon (On-Air Talent)
- Gerald Bonney (as Gerry Marshall)
