= Orny Adams =

Actor, comedy writer, stand-up comic (born 1970)

- Born: Adam Jason Orenstein; November 10, 1970 (age 55); Lexington, Massachusetts, U.S.
- Occupations: Actor; comedy writer; stand-up comic

Comedy career
- Years active: 2000–present
- Medium: stand-up, television
- Website: OrnyAdams.com

Adam Jason Orenstein (born 10 November 1970), known professionally as Orny Adams, is an American actor, comedy writer and stand-up comic. He is best known for his role as Coach Bobby Finstock on the MTV series Teen Wolf.

== Personal life ==
Adams was born in Lexington, Massachusetts. He was raised in a Conservative Jewish household, and at summers he attended Camp Tel Noar in nearby New Hampshire. He has two sisters. In 2018, Adams and his family visited Israel for the first time.

He graduated from Lexington High School in 1989, then earned a bachelor's degree from Emory University in 1993, majoring in political science and philosophy.

== Career ==
Adams has made appearances on The Tonight Show with Jay Leno. He was featured in the 2002 documentary Comedian starring Jerry Seinfeld.

Adams' comedy DVD/CD Path of Most Resistance was released on November 10, 2006. On October 29, 2010, Adams' one-hour comedy special Orny Adams Takes The Third premiered on Comedy Central. On December 1, 2017, Adams' third comedy special, Orny Adams: More Than Loud, premiered on Showtime.

In 2007, CBS Television Distribution and Yahoo! announced a development deal with Ashton Kutcher’s production company Katalyst for Tube, which was to have been hosted by Adams and featured viral videos, comedy bits and sketches. In 2011, Adams was cast as Coach Bobby Finstock in the MTV series Teen Wolf. It was originally announced that he would not return to the show beyond season 5 to focus more on his comedy, but would return for the last ten episodes of season 5. However, he ended up reprising the role in several episodes of season 6, even appearing in the series' final episode.

In September 2021, it was announced that a reunion film for Teen Wolf had been ordered by Paramount+, with Jeff Davis returning as a screenwriter and executive producer for the film. The majority of the original cast members, including Adams, reprised their roles. The film, Teen Wolf: The Movie, was released on January 26, 2023.

On July 5, 2022, Orny uploaded his full comedy special, "More Than Loud," to his YouTube channel. By March 2024, it has over 5.2 million views.

In his stand-up, Adams does observational comedy.

== Filmography ==
Film roles
| Year | Title | Role | Notes |
|---|---|---|---|
| 2002 | Comedian | Himself | Documentary |
| 2009 | Funny People | Himself | Cameo |
| 2023 | Teen Wolf: The Movie | Coach Bobby Finstock | |

Television roles
| Year | Title | Role | Notes |
|---|---|---|---|
| 2000 | Late Show with David Letterman | Himself | 1 episode |
| 2003 | Last Call with Carson Daly | Himself | 1 episode |
| 2004 | Tough Crowd with Colin Quinn | Himself | 1 episode |
| 2004–2007 | The Tonight Show with Jay Leno | Himself | 4 episodes |
| 2007 | Tom Green's House Tonight | Himself | 1 episode |
| 2010 | Takes the Third | Himself | Comedy Central special |
| 2011–2017 | Teen Wolf | Coach Bobby Finstock | Recurring role (seasons 1–4, 6); guest role (season 5) |
| 2012–2014 | Comics Unleashed | Himself | 2 episodes |
| 2014 | Just for Laughs: On Tour | Himself | Television film |
| 2015 | Just for Laughs | Himself | 1 episode |
| 2015 | The Halifax Comedy Festival | Himself | 4 episodes |
| 2016 | All Def Digital's Roast of America | Himself | Television film |
| 2016–2017 | WGN Morning News | Himself | 2 episodes |
| 2017 | Conan | Himself | 1 episode |
| 2017 | More Than Loud | Himself | Showtime comedy special |
