= WGAU =

Coordinates: 33°56′28″N 83°23′56″W

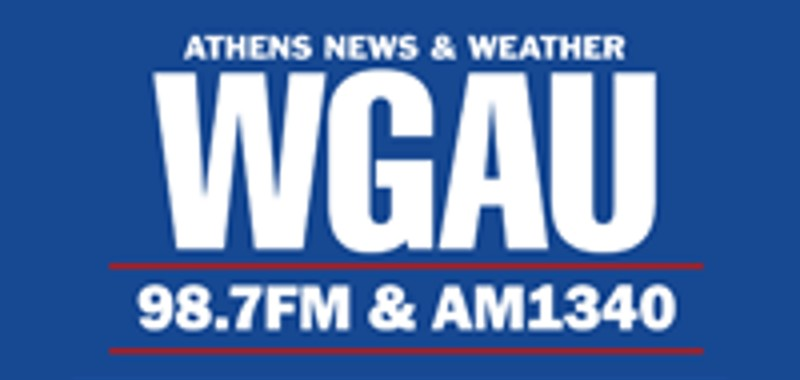

Athens, Georgia; United States
- Broadcast area: North Georgia
- Frequency: 1340 kHz
- Branding: "98.7 FM and 1340 AM WGAU"

Programming
- Format: News/talk
- Affiliations: Fox News Radio; NBC News Radio; Premiere Networks; Radio America

Ownership
- Owner: Cox Media Group; (Cox Radio, LLC)
- Sister stations: WGMG, WPUP, WRFC, WNGC, WXKT

History
- First air date: May 1, 1938

Technical information
- Licensing authority: FCC
- Facility ID: 11709
- Class: C
- Power: 1,000 watts unlimited
- Translator: 98.7 W254CJ (Athens)

Links
- Public license information: Public file; LMS
- Webcast: Listen Live
- Website: wgauradio.com

WGAU (1340 AM, "News-Talk 1340") is a radio station licensed to serve Athens, Georgia, United States, that broadcasts a news/talk format. The station is owned by Cox Media Group. The transmitter is located at the studios (with WNGC) in Five Points.

WGAU began broadcasting on May 1, 1938. In 1948, WGAU put WGAU-FM on the air. It was purchased in 1956 by Clarke Broadcasting Company, owned by H. Randolph Holder and Tom Lloyd, two broadcasters who also owned WLAQ in Rome, Georgia, and WGRI in Griffin, Georgia. Holder was a popular Athens newsman whose morning and midday news commentaries had a wide following.

The station has played many different musical formats before switching to the current format of news and talk in the early 1990s. Over the years, it served as a launching pad for a number of successful broadcasters who worked at WGAU during their student days at the Henry Grady College of Journalism at the nearby University of Georgia: Harry Chapman, later with WTVF in Nashville, Tennessee, and Bruce Bartley, the lead newscaster of Atlanta's WSB Radio. Former WGAU news director John Holliman went on to be a news reporter for CNN. He rose to prominence as one of CNN's "Boys of Baghdad" during the first Persian Gulf War in 1991 and was one of only three journalists reporting from Baghdad when allied bombing of the city began. He was later known for his coverage of science, technology, and space exploration. In May 1999, NASA dedicated the Launch Complex 39 Press Site auditorium at the Kennedy Space Center in Holliman's name.

Country legend Bill Anderson was a DJ on WGAU in the 1950s when he was 19, and was fired for playing country music. In an interview with Tim Bryant , Bill said H. Randolph Holder, owner of WGAU, offered him a job under the condition he would not play country music. One evening, Bill was running an Atlanta Crackers baseball game which became rained out. Instructions in the studio said if the game gets rained out, to switch to the CBS Radio Network. When Bill switched to the network, The "Louisiana Hay Ride" was on, and Johnny Horton's "Honky Tonk Man" was playing. Before the song was finished, Holder had called Bill to get the program off the air. Holder fired Bill that following Monday, but got him a job at a new radio station in Commerce.

In January 2008, it was announced that WGAU and WNGC were sold (along with sister stations WGMG, WPUP, WRFC) to Cox Radio in Atlanta. WGAU was the home to many University of Georgia sports, which air now on sister "Sports Radio 960 WRFC"

In late June 2024, Cox Radio abruptly dismissed staff at the station, including long time personality Tim Bryant. Notable syndicated programming includes talk shows by right-wing conservatives Brian Kilmeade, Rush Limbaugh, Sean Hannity and Dana Losech as well as consumer advocate Clark Howard and the paranormal Coast to Coast AM radio show.

The station is an affiliate of the Atlanta Braves radio network, the largest radio affiliate network in Major League Baseball. The station is also affiliated with Fox News Radio and The Weather Channel.
