= WPUP =

Radio station in Watkinsville–Athens, Georgia

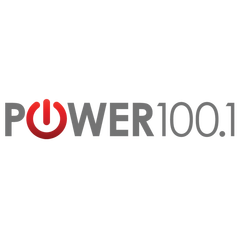
- Watkinsville, Georgia; United States
- Broadcast area: Athens, Georgia
- Frequency: 100.1 MHz
- Branding: Power 100.1

Programming
- Format: Top 40 (CHR)

Ownership
- Owner: Cox Media Group; (Cox Radio, LLC)
- Sister stations: WNGC, WGAU, WXKT, WGMG, WRFC

History
- First air date: June 1, 1970 (as WLOV-FM)
- Former call signs: WLOV-FM (1970–1984); WGPL (1984–1986); WLOV-FM (1986–1998); WXKT (1998–2008)
- Call sign meaning: "Puppy"

Technical information
- Licensing authority: FCC
- Facility ID: 51120
- Class: A
- ERP: 6,000 watts
- HAAT: 88 meters
- Transmitter coordinates: 33°44′2.00″N 82°43′10.00″W

Links
- Public license information: Public file; LMS
- Webcast: Listen Live
- Website: powerathens.com

WPUP (100.1 FM, "Power 100.1") is a radio station broadcasting a Top 40 (CHR) format. Licensed to the Athens suburb of Watkinsville, it serves the Athens metropolitan area. It first began broadcasting in Washington in 1970. It is currently owned by Cox Media Group. Its studios are located in Bogart, and its transmitter is in Royston.

== History ==
WPUP originally signed on June 1, 1970, as WLOV-FM in Washington, Georgia. The station was co-owned with WLOV (1550 AM) and broadcast as a local station, carrying the WLOV-FM call letters except for a brief two-year period from 1984 to 1986. On August 14, 1998, Cumulus Media purchased WLOV-AM-FM from P&T Broadcasting for $533,000. In August 2008, WPUP was sold (along with sister stations WGMG, WNGC, WRFC, and WGAU) to Cox Radio in Atlanta. Cox swapped callsigns, moving WXKT to 103.7 and changing 100.1 FM to the current WPUP. The two stations began simulcasting the "Bulldog" classic-rock format; WXKT 100.1 had previously programmed a "Real Country" format.

On September 30, 2009, WPUP dropped the "Bulldog" classic-rock format and began stunting as "Obama Government Controlled Radio at 100.1 FM". Station identifiers claimed (jokingly) that the station has been taken over by the government: it intermittently simulcast the Hawaiian music format of KCCN-FM in Honolulu, played clips from speeches by President Obama, and played other music he might enjoy, such as the theme song to Shaft.

The WXKT callsign remains on 103.7 FM, which changed its city of license from Royston to Maysville and now programs variety adult hits for the Gainesville-Athens market.
