= WCHM =

- Clarkesville, Georgia; United States
- Frequency: 1490 kHz

Programming
- Format: Talk radio
- Affiliations: Fox News Radio

Ownership
- Owner: Cole and Catherine Cleiman; (Cleiman Communications, LLC)

Technical information
- Licensing authority: FCC
- Facility ID: 32298
- Class: C
- Power: 880 watts
- Transmitter coordinates: 34°36′27.00″N 83°32′15.00″W
- Translator: 94.3 W232DU (Clarkesville)

Links
- Public license information: Public file; LMS
- Website: wchmradio.com

WCHM (1490 AM) is a radio station licensed to Clarkesville, Georgia, United States, broadcasting a talk radio format. The station is currently owned by Catherine and Cole Cleiman, a mother and son duo operating under Cleiman Communications, LLC. and features programming from Premiere Networks and Fox News Radio. The station also features University of Georgia sports programming.

WCHM has been granted an FCC construction permit to decrease both day and night power to 790 watts. The current antenna will be replaced by one that is more efficient. The power reduction is necessary to prevent new interference to other stations on that frequency.
