= WBKZ (AM) =

- Jefferson, Georgia; United States
- Broadcast area: Athens, Georgia
- Frequency: 880 kHz

Ownership
- Owner: Brown Broadcasting System, Inc.

History
- First air date: 1984
- Last air date: April 19, 2007
- Former call signs: WEEG (1984–1986); WBKZ (1986–2007)

Technical information
- Facility ID: 7315
- Class: D
- Power: 5,000 watts (days only)
- Transmitter coordinates: 34°0′52.4″N 83°27′10.6″W

WBKZ (880 AM) was a radio station licensed to Jefferson, Georgia, United States, and serving the Athens area. The station was last owned by Brown Broadcasting System, Inc.

== History ==
The station was assigned the call letters WEEG on May 21, 1984. On August 30, 1986, the station changed its call sign to WBKZ; on April 19, 2007, the license and call sign were deleted from the FCC database and archived as "DWBKZ".

The format had changed over the years to serve primarily the African American community airing gospel music, blues, news, talk shows, and car races.

WBKZ continued as an Internet-only radio station at z88online.com.

== Contacto Latino ==
WBKZ played an important role to expand Contacto Latino, the very first Spanish radio program in Northeast Georgia, which became one of the most successful radio shows in the early 1990s. Contacto Latino was founded by Francisco O. Alvarez and Juan J. Alvarez, Mexican immigrants with a great vision of what their community needed. They played a large variety of Spanish music, news, and other interesting topics to help the Latin American community in Athens, in adapting to their new life style and environment. Some of the VIPs who were key supporting and helping Contacto Latino were Jackie Ritchie, Keith Johnson, Mr. Walter Allen Jr., Dr. Victor Morales, The Catholic Social Services, and most importantly Stan Carter, who welcomed and opened the doors of WBKZ to all the Latin American community in Athens, Georgia.

The Alvarez brothers also helped the community in monetary, social, educational, and emergency support needs. One of the longer lasting sponsor was the Prince Avenue Hispanic Baptist Church, buying air every weekend to transmit "Palabras de Vida" with Reverendo Manuel Rojas. Ay Caramba and the Mexican Super Market "Los Compadres" were also important sponsors and contributors. The University of Texas supported Contacto Latino with the stars and space cultural show called Universo, a prerecorded program. Contacto Latino played music from two main record companies, Fonovisa with all its labels, and EMI Capitol; these two companies were active and supportive of the program. Contacto Latino opened the doors to American-owned businesses to reach the Latino market in this region, and supported the newly created Latino businesses in their starting stages and development. Contacto Latino was first aired on WXAG, and then moved gradually to WBKZ. At some point the program was transmitted on both stations simultaneously. Contacto Latino's first transmission was on September 15, 1990, and last transmission on September 16, 1995.
