= WGMG =

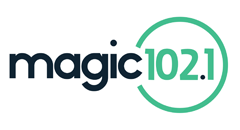

Crawford, Georgia; United States
- Broadcast area: Athens, Georgia
- Frequency: 102.1 MHz
- Branding: Magic 102.1

Programming
- Format: Adult contemporary
- Affiliations: Compass Media Networks

Ownership
- Owner: Cox Media Group; (Cox Radio, LLC)
- Sister stations: WNGC, WGAU, WPUP, WRFC, WXKT

History
- First air date: April 1990

Technical information
- Licensing authority: FCC
- Facility ID: 48374
- Class: C3
- ERP: 10,000 watts
- HAAT: 100 meters
- Transmitter coordinates: 33°55′18.00″N 83°14′14.00″W

Links
- Public license information: Public file; LMS
- Webcast: Listen Live
- Website: magic1021.com

WGMG (102.1 FM) is a radio station broadcasting an Adult Contemporary format. Licensed to Crawford, Georgia, United States, with studios in Athens, Georgia. The station is owned by Cox Media Group. Its studios are located in Bogart, and its transmitter is located east of Athens.

Magic 102.1 was the flagship station for Southern Broadcasting Companies. The station was the home of The University of Georgia Lady Dogs Basketball. As of January 2008 WGMG along with sister stations WNGC, WPUP, WRFC, WGAU and WXKT (Washington, GA) were sold to Cox Media Group in Atlanta.

== Programming ==
Notable weekday programming includes "Magic Mornings with Alichia" from 5am-10am, "Magic Middays" with Walker from 10am-2pm, Mookie from 2pm-7pm and nights with Natalie from 7pm-Midnight. Notable weekend programming includes "The Retro Pop Reunion" Saturday nights from 7pm-11pm.

== History ==
In January 2008, it was announced that WGMG was sold (along with sister stations WNGC, WPUP, WRFC, and WGAU) to Cox Radio/Cox Media Group in Atlanta.
