= Eaddy Mays =

American actress and producer

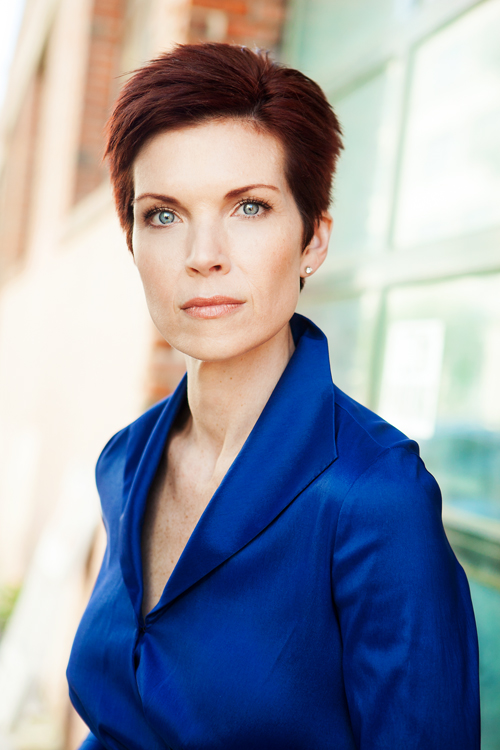
- Eaddy Mays in 2013
- Born: Huntington, New York, U.S.
- Education: University of Georgia (BA)
- Occupations: Actress; producer

Eaddy Mays is an American actress and producer. Mays is known for her role as Elaine in the 2009 film The Blind Side. Mays is also known for her portrayal of Victoria Argent in the MTV supernatural drama series, Teen Wolf, a role that led to her being dubbed "The Scariest Mom on TV" and even "The Scariest Person on TV".

== Early life ==
Mays was born in Huntington, New York and raised by her mother in Port Washington, New York. She began acting as a child at the age of ten when she was cast as Gerda in the Port Washington Play Troupe production of The Snow Queen, based on Hans Christian Andersen's tale, adapted and directed by Susanne Traub. As a young teenager, Mays hosted video presentations for the production company owned by her step-father, singer/songwriter/actor, Bob Haymes, writer of the song "That's All" which is part of the Great American Songbook. During Mays's freshman year of college, Haymes died of Lou Gehrig's disease. This work brought the teenage Mays to China in 1984 and later to Hong Kong and Japan.

== Education ==
Mays began high school at Paul D. Schreiber High School and during her Junior year moved with her family to Greenville, South Carolina where she graduated at age 17 from James L. Mann High School. During her school years, she was cast as "Courtney" in the play Class Dismissed, written at age 19, by Craig Nevius. The play takes place in a classroom after an English teacher who, when frustrated with his students' lackadaisical approach to their education, takes severe measures, and holds his toughest students hostage at gunpoint in his classroom. The show was produced by the South Carolina Children's Theatre.

While in high school, Mays also studied theatre at the South Carolina Governor's School for the Arts & Humanities and upon graduation, she attended the University of Georgia for four years, graduating with a Bachelor of Arts in history.

In 1996, Mays attended the American Academy of Dramatic Arts summer program in New York City.

== Career ==
=== Acting ===
After completing college, Mays remained in the North Georgia area working in commercial radio and television in both Athens and Atlanta, Georgia. She was Operations Manager as well as Morning Show co-host at WGMG FM radio station and continued her involvement with community theatre directing "Steel Magnolias" and starring in "Crimes of the Heart" as Meg MaGrath.

Though Mays worked in local television hosting a music video show at WNGM-TV34 in Athens, Georgia, (now known as WUVG-DT) her earliest credited television work was in the 1996 pilot episode of the crime procedural Profiler (TV series), in which she portrayed a police desk sergeant.

For several years, Mays continued to accumulate multiple television and film credits in the Southeast taking advantage of the tremendous growth in the region's entertainment industry stimulated by the 2008 tax incentive signed by former Georgia Governor, Sonny Perdue. The tax incentive created an exponential expansion of film and television production in Georgia gave Atlanta the nickname, "Hollywood of the South." But the growth also increased competition in the market, as Mays's is reported saying during an interview with Atlanta's NBC affiliate WXIA-TV 11Alive: "L.A. actors are saying 'We'll come to Atlanta; we'll work as local talent; we'll fly ourselves here, and we'll work for scale.... That means we as actors have to be more competitive. We can't look like local hires anymore."

In 2009, when cast as a cancer patient for a Lexington Medical Center commercial, Mays shaved her own head completely bald, capturing the event on video which was posted by Lexington Medical Center on YouTube. This radical change in appearance prompted a shift in Mays's career and shortly thereafter she was cast in the recurring role of "Victoria Argent" in MTV's supernatural drama series, Teen Wolf. She appeared occasionally in season 1; and throughout season 2 she was featured as a chilling, memorable villain. For her portrayal of Victoria Argent, Zap2it.com honored Mays as one of the "Underrated TV Stars of 2012."

There was speculation about whether Mays would reprise her role in the third season of the show, which broadcast in the US in June 2013. When interviewed about the matter, Mays said, "It's Teen Wolf – anything is possible. No one knows anything for sure on this project; they even shot two endings to season two! …. You just never know, and that's part of why Teen Wolf is so wonderful and Jeff Davis [the show's creator and executive producer] is so brilliant." Mays' Victoria Argent character ultimately did return in the third season of Teen Wolf, appearing in several episodes as a presence in her character's daughter's psyche, as well as in a flashback sequence in the mid-season finale.

=== Producing ===
In 2010, Mays expanded her career experience to include film and television producer when she co-wrote, produced and starred in the independent feature film, romantic comedy Highland Fling, about a fun-loving Scotsman and a straight-laced southern belle shooting a reality TV show at a Scottish Highland Festival in small town America.

Mays is in negotiations to sell Highland Fling, which is currently making the rounds of the independent film festival circuit after first being accepted as the opening night film at the Atlanta Underground Film Festival in 2012.

Although Highland Fling is a fictional story, it involves actual, real-time events since Mays and her crew simultaneously produced the reality television show pilot, Under the Kilt. Under the Kilt captures the making and unfolding of Gallabrae, the annual Scottish Highland Games held in Greenville, South Carolina. During the filming, Mays accepted an invitation to join a luncheon at the event where she dined sitting next to His Royal Highness the Prince Edward, Earl of Wessex, Most Distinguished Guest that year.

Mays was asked by producer, writer, Martin Thomas, to accept the co-leading role of "Stephanie" in the 2014 action, crime-thriller feature film Fighting Back.

In 2009, Mays moved the base of operation for her production company, Eaddy Mays Productions, Inc., from Los Angeles, California back to Atlanta, Georgia, where she now also owns and operates the company.

== Volunteer work ==
At 14 years old, Mays was told she was too young to yet be a volunteer at the International Helen Keller Institute, located in her hometown. Later, at age 17, while in college, Mays volunteered as a producer and reader for the Athens, Georgia unit of Recording for the Blind and Dyslexic, now known as Learning Ally.

In college, Mays also began a long history of volunteer work with children, becoming first a "big sister" in Big Brothers Big Sisters of America. Then, in 1995, she became the Custodian and Legal Guardian for a displaced young girl in the custody of the State of Georgia's Foster Care program. Again in 2001, Mays gained custody and legal guardianship of another at-risk youth.

These experiences led Mays, in 2004, to help create Protect the Children, Inc., an umbrella company for the Highland House, a homeless shelter for at-risk youth displaced from their home. Mays served as president of the board of the organization and volunteer in the shelter for several years. She also served briefly as a board member for Piedmont Court Appointed Special Advocates and as a mentor in the North Georgia school district where she resided at the time.

In 2007, Mays independently produced and directed a community theatre version of the stage play "Class Dismissed," the same play in which she had starred as a teenager. The production featured teenagers in all but one role, both on-stage and behind the scenes.

Mays continues to volunteer at elementary, middle and high schools. She continues to raise her three children, two dogs, an evil cat, and a Percheron mare.

== Filmography ==
=== Film ===
Year	Title	Role	Notes
2009	The Blind Side	Elaine	
2010	Highland Fling	Easley	also producer, writer and assistant editor
2012	Madea's Witness Protection	Agent Thomas	
2012	The Collection	Lynn	Uncredited
2013	The Restless	Ms. Taylor	Short film
2018	All Angles	Jane Scoop Tetley	Short film
2019	Amplified	Karen Patton	Short film
2020	Esc.	Night woman 1	Short film
2023	Teen Wolf: The Movie	Victoria Argent	

=== Television ===
Year	Title	Role	Notes
1996	Profiler	Desk Sergeant	Episode: "Insight"
2010	Army Wives	Andrea Arnold	Episode: "Homefront"
2010	Meet the Browns	Mrs. Griggs	Episode: "Meet the Country Cousin"
2010	Master Suites	Herself	Host
2011–2013	Teen Wolf	Victoria Argent	Recurring role (seasons 1–2); guest role (season 3)
2011	Single Ladies	Officer Anderson	Episode: "Old Dogs, New Tricks"
2011	Reed Between the Lines	Woman in Pink	Episode: "Let's Talk About Talking"
2011	Its Supernatural	Diane Kirkwood	Episode: "Kerry Kirkwood 2011"
2012	Coma	Tour Guide	Television mini-series
2019	Saints & Sinners	Arbitrator Kay Williams	3 episodes

=== Director ===
Year	Title	Notes
2017	The Only Heart I Own	Short film; also writer
2017	Daphne Meadows: It Takes a Forest	Short film
2017	Close	Short film
2017	Caytee Grimalkin	Short film
2017	Spin Control	Short film
2017	Betrayal	Short film
