= WLOV (AM) =

Adult standards radio station in Washington, Georgia

- Washington, Georgia; United States
- Frequency: 1370 kHz
- Branding: 101.3 WLOV

Programming
- Format: Classic hits

Ownership
- Owner: Southern Stone Broadcasting, Inc.
- Operator: Oconee Communications Company

History
- First air date: October 1, 1984 (as WGPL)
- Former call signs: WGPL (1984–1986)

Technical information
- Licensing authority: FCC
- Facility ID: 51125
- Class: D
- Power: 1,000 watts day
- Transmitter coordinates: 33°44′2.5″N 82°43′9.5″W
- Translator: (101.3 MHz) W267CR (Washington)

Links
- Public license information: Public file; LMS
- Website: wlovradio.com

WLOV (1370 AM) is a radio station licensed to Washington, Georgia, United States. It is owned by Southern Stone Broadcasting, Inc. and operated under a local marketing agreement (LMA) by Oconee Communications Company.

== History ==
The station went on the air as WGPL on October 1, 1984. On April 15, 1986, it changed its callsign to WLOV.

On August 14, 1998, Cumulus Media purchased WLOV and WLOV-FM from P&T Broadcasting for $533,000.
