= My Wildest Dreams =

My Wildest Dreams may refer to:

- My Wildest Dreams (album), a 2019 album by Claire Richards
- My Wildest Dreams (TV series), an American sitcom
