= Lisa Ann Walter =

American actress (born 1963)

- Walter in 2025
- Born: August 3, 1963 (age 63); Silver Spring, Maryland, U.S.
- Education: Catholic University (BFA)
- Occupations: Actress; comedian; television producer
- Years active: 1995–present
- Spouse: Sam Baum (m. 1983; div. 1999)
- Children: 4
- Lisa Ann Walter's voice Lisa Ann Walter on her advocacy for public education. Recorded April 18, 2025

Lisa Ann Walter (born August 3, 1963) is an American actress, comedian, and television producer, best known for her roles as Chessy in the romantic comedy film The Parent Trap (1998) and Melissa Schemmenti on the ABC mockumentary sitcom Abbott Elementary (2021–present), for which she received a Screen Actors Guild Award for Outstanding Ensemble in a Comedy Series.

She was formerly the creator and executive producer of Oxygen network reality weight-loss competition series, Dance Your Ass Off. Her other reality television work includes serving as a judge on ABC's reality television series The Next Best Thing: Who Is the Greatest Celebrity Impersonator?, as well as winning celebrity editions of the game shows The Weakest Link and Jeopardy! She also created and starred in the 1996–1997 sitcom, Life's Work, and appeared in such films as Bruce Almighty, Shall We Dance, and War of the Worlds.

To date, Walter is the eighteenth highest-earning game show contestant of all time, having accumulated a total of $1,242,500 on her game show appearances.

== Early life and education ==
Walter was born on August 3, 1963, in Silver Spring, Maryland. She and her older sister, Laura, are the children of a British geophysicist father who was born in France of Alsatian descent and a substitute-teacher mother of Sicilian descent. Walter's maternal great-grandparents immigrated to New York City from Italy. Walter's family lived in different places following their father's work, and their childhood homes included Germany and the suburbs of Washington, D.C. She graduated with a theater degree from Catholic University of America in Washington, D.C., in 1983.

== Career ==
After five years of standup comedy, Walter starred in her own Fox Network comedy series, My Wildest Dreams (1995), followed by an ABC sitcom, Life's Work (1996–1997), which she both created and starred in. Walter also co-starred in the Bravo series Breaking News and in the NBC sitcom Emeril. She played Whoopi Goldberg's tarty sidekick Claudine in Eddie (1996).

Walter co-starred in the Disney film The Parent Trap (1998); in the remake of the original film, she appeared as Chessy, the nanny to Dennis Quaid's character's daughter, who was played by a young Lindsay Lohan. Since then, she played supporting roles in the comedy Bruce Almighty (2003) and the romantic comedy Shall We Dance (2004).

In early 2007, Walter had a supporting role as Mabel, the bartender in the MyNetworkTV soap opera Watch Over Me. Later that May, she served as a judge on the ABC reality TV show The Next Best Thing, which searched for the best celebrity impersonators in America. In early 2008, Walter was in the comedy film Drillbit Taylor, and also starred in the VH1 reality series Celebracadabra, in which celebrities competed to see who was the best magician among them. She made it to the final three but was eliminated in the sixth episode. She has developed a series for the Oxygen network called Dance Your Ass Off. On December 19, 2011, she played a dramatic role on the TNT series Rizzoli & Isles as a ballet coach.

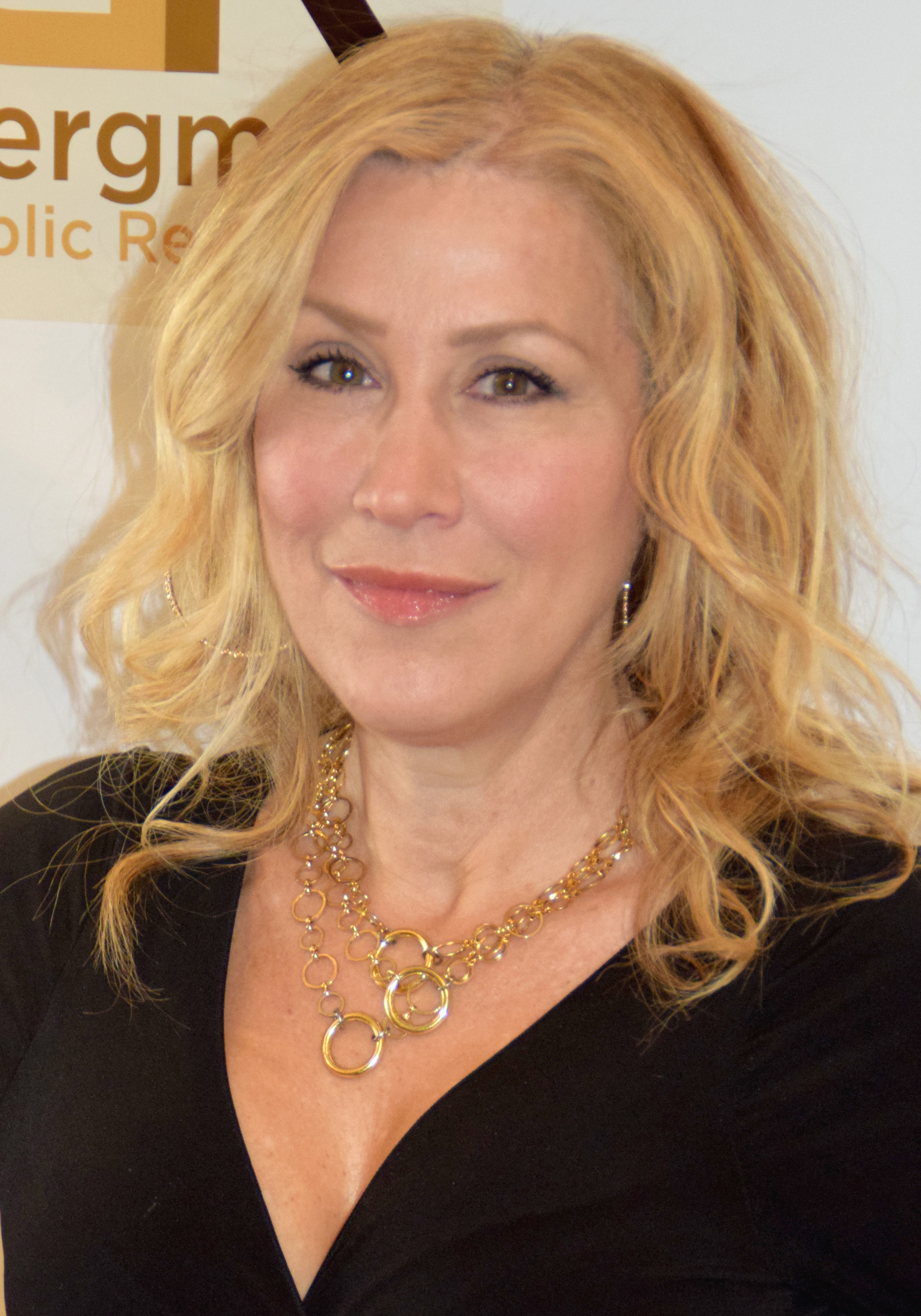
Walter in 2015

Her comic memoir, The Best Thing About My Ass Is That It's Behind Me, was published in May 2011. Beginning in May 2011, Walter hosted The Fabulous Lisa Ann Walter Show, a talk show on the Los Angeles radio station KFI. The program aired for three hours each Saturday and Sunday. In August 2014, Walter quit to focus on her acting career.

Since 2021, Walter has appeared in the ABC comedy Abbott Elementary as second grade teacher Melissa Schemmenti. Walter, alongside the show's ensemble cast, won the Screen Actors Guild Award for Outstanding Performance by an Ensemble in a Comedy Series at the 2023 ceremony and was nominated again the following year.

Walter (right) posing for a photograph with Congresswoman Ayanna Pressley at a July 2024 event

On October 20, 2022, Walter received the Virtuoso Award at the San Diego International Film Festival. In 2024, she won the second season of Celebrity Jeopardy!, defeating Mo Rocca and Katie Nolan in the finals. She won $1 million for the Entertainment Community Fund.

On October 14, 2025, Walter reunited with her best friend and former The Parent Trap co-star Elaine Hendrix on the 34th season of Dancing with the Stars. To celebrate the season's Dedication Night episode, Walter, Hendrix, and Dancing with the Stars pro dancer Alan Bersten performed a foxtrot to This Will Be by Natalie Cole.

== Personal life ==
In 1983, she married fellow actor Sam Baum. They had a son, Jordan (1988), and a daughter, Delia (1992), before divorcing in 1999. She has twin sons, Spencer and Simon Walter (born October 11, 2000).

== Filmography ==
=== Film ===
Year	Title	Role	Notes
1996	Eddie	Claudine	
1998	The Parent Trap	Chessy	
2000	Get Your Stuff	Nancy Perry	
2001	Early Bird Special	Janet	
2003	Bruce Almighty	Debbie Conelly	
2004	Shall We Dance?	Bobbie	
2005	War of the Worlds	Sheryl	
2005	The Trouble with Dee Dee	Dee Dee Rutherford	
2006	Room 6	Sgt. Burch	
2006	Coffee Date	Sara	
2006	Man vs. Monday	Joan	Short film
2007	Graduation	Carol	
2007	Entry Level	Kathie	
2008	Drillbit Taylor	Dolores	
2010	Wreckage	Dr. Richardson	
2010	Killers	Olivia Brooks	
2010	Monsters Under the Bed	Leslie Branson	Short film
2012	Wedding Day	Chef Cherie	
2013	Feels So Good	Lisa Wright	
2014	Wish Wizard	Helga	Short film
2015	You Can't Have It	Suzanne	
2015	Dependent's Day	Bette	
2015	The LA Spinster	Lisa	Short film
2017	The Ice Cream Truck	Christina	
2019	Stripped	Margot Mathison	
2020	Jersey	Tess	Short film
2022	The Ladies	Blanche	Short film
2023	Diary of a Wimpy Kid Christmas: Cabin Fever	Gabby (voice)	voice role

=== Television ===
Year	Title	Role	Notes
1995	My Wildest Dreams	Lisa McGinnis	Main role and also producer
1996–1997	Life's Work	Lisa Ann Hunter	Main role and also producer
1997	Late Bloomer	Cassie Baltic	TV film
1998	The Love Boat: The Next Wave	Audrey Cranston	"How Long Has This Been Going On?"
2000	Curb Your Enthusiasm	Nurse	"Interior Decorator"
2001	Emeril	Cassandra Gilman	Main role
2001	Strong Medicine	Rita Harper	"Hot Flash"
2002	Breaking News	Rachel Glass	Main role
2004	Las Vegas	Rose Gluck	"Sons and Lovers"
2006	Modern Men	Iris	"Kyle Dates Up"
2006	Nip/Tuck	Mrs. Hickock	"Reefer"
2006	Watch Over Me	Mabel	"Pilot", "The Engagement", "Goodbye"
2011	Rizzoli & Isles	Coach JJ	"Don't Stop Dancing, Girl"
2013–2015	The Exes	Margo	"Defending Your Wife", "What Dreams May Come", "Along Came Holly"
2016	The Odd Couple	Linda	"All About Eavesdropping", "All The Residents' Men"
2017	GLOW	Lorene	"Debbie Does Something"
2019	Grey's Anatomy	Shirley Gregory	"Reunited", "My Shot"
2020	Sydney to the Max	Marlene	"Father of the Bribe", "Night Not at the Museum"
2021	9-1-1	Delia Narwood	"9-1-1, What's Your Grievance?"
2021–present	Abbott Elementary	Melissa Schemmenti	Main role
2023	Celebrity Jeopardy!	Herself	Tournament champion
2025	It's Always Sunny in Philadelphia	Melissa Schemmenti	Episode: "The Gang F****s Up Abbott Elementary"
2025	Dancing with the Stars	Herself	Episode 5: Dedication Night

== Awards and nominations ==
Year	Award	Category	Work	Result
2006	Dixie Film Festival	Outstanding Actor/Actress in a Comedy	The Trouble with Dee Dee	Won
2022	San Diego International Film Festival	Virtuoso Award		Won
2023	Screen Actors Guild Awards	Outstanding Performance by an Ensemble in a Comedy Series	Abbott Elementary	Won
2023	Peabody Award		Abbott Elementary	Won
2023	Gold Derby Awards	Comedy Supporting Actress	Abbott Elementary	Nominated
2024	Screen Actors Guild Awards	Outstanding Performance by an Ensemble in a Comedy Series	Abbott Elementary	Nominated
2024	Astra Television Awards	Best Supporting Actress in Broadcast Network or Cable Comedy Series	Abbott Elementary	Nominated
2025	Screen Actors Guild Awards	Outstanding Performance by an Ensemble in a Comedy Series	Abbott Elementary	Nominated
2025	Newport Beach TV Festival	Outstanding Comedy Ensemble	Abbott Elementary	Won
