= Screamboat =

2025 film by Steven LaMorte

- Theatrical release poster
- Directed by: Steven LaMorte
- Screenplay by: Matthew Garcia-Dunn; Steven LaMorte
- Story by: Steven LaMorte
- Based on: Steamboat Willie by: Walt Disney; Ub Iwerks
- Produced by: Steven LaMorte; Amy Schumacher; Martine Melloul; Steven Della Salle; Michael Leavy
- Starring: David Howard Thornton; Allison Pittel; Amy Schumacher; Jesse Posey; Kailey Hyman; Jesse Kove; Jarlath Conroy
- Cinematography: Steven Della Salle
- Edited by: Patrick Lawrence
- Music by: Yael Benamour; Charles-Henri Avelange
- Production companies: Sleight of Hand Productions; Kali Pictures; Fuzz on the Lens Productions
- Distributed by: Iconic Events Releasing
- Release date: April 2, 2025
- Running time: 102 minutes
- Country: United States
- Language: English
- Box office: $393,011

Screamboat is a 2025 American slasher film co-written, co-produced and directed by Steven LaMorte. It is a reimagining of Walt Disney and Ub Iwerks's 1928 animated short film, Steamboat Willie. The plot follows a group of New Yorkers who are terrorized by a monstrous mouse named Steamboat Willie. It stars David Howard Thornton, Allison Pittel, Amy Schumacher, Jesse Posey, Kailey Hyman, Jesse Kove, and Jarlath Conroy.

Though the Walt Disney Company retains exclusive rights to its own Mickey Mouse universe, the Steamboat Willie version of the character entered the public domain on January 1, 2024. One day later, Screamboat was announced.

Screamboat was released theatrically in the United States and United Kingdom on April 2, 2025, and later released on DVD, Blu-ray, and streaming in the United States on May 2, 2025. The film received mixed reviews from critics. A sequel titled Screamboat 2: Nothing Stays Dead, is in development.

== Plot ==
Aboard an old Staten Island Ferry named Mortimer, maintenance workers Neil and Dominique inadvertently release a mutant mouse, Steamboat Willie, from a sealed chamber below deck. The creature kills Neil before attacking Dominique.

Selena, a bartender with disillusioned dreams of becoming an artist, races to the ferry to escape a quintet of obnoxious socialites drunkenly celebrating a birthday. Selena has a meet-cute moment with Pete, a ferry employee who takes her aboard. While alone, Selena witnesses Willie murdering a police officer. Selena tries to alert Pete, an EMT named Amber, police officer Lieutenant Diaz, and first mate Tommy, yet no one believes her. After strangling Captain Bill Clark to death, Willie redirects the ferry's course. Throughout the rest of the night, Willie kills numerous passengers including Selena’s socialites from earlier, well as several cops and deckhands. Upon finding the captain's body, Tommy puts himself in charge and appoints Pete as the new first mate, directing Pete and Diaz to escort the passengers to the lower level for their safety. Amber also realises Selena was telling the truth when she sees Willie using a forklift to kill two other passengers.

Diaz rallies many of the surviving passengers against Willie, only to be suddenly killed by the latter with a pole through his throat. He then sprays the crowd with a firehose, before activating a power box to mass electrocute them. Matteo, the son of Borough President Molinari, is escorted by a burly man named Moses, and the two regroup with Selena, Amber, and Pete on the bridge. The five survivors encounter Barry, a former ferry deckhand who explains that Willie was once a normal rodent who was experimented on by mad scientists. The ferry’s benevolent captain, Walter, eventually discovered Willie and set him free, but the creature became deeply disturbed and disappeared following an unknown tragedy.

Pete and Selena share a kiss while searching with Amber, Moses, and Matteo to find distress signal flares. All of a sudden, Dominique appears and attacks Moses, revealing that since his initial attack, she has been doing Willie's bidding to help the mouse find another one of his kind in exchange for sparing her life. Despite this, Willie turns on and attacks Dominique following an encounter with Selena and Amber. Moses sacrifices himself by firing a flare whose resulting explosion kills Dominique. However, the blast also blows a hole in the ferry. With the ferry sinking, Selena and Amber save Matteo from drowning while Pete willingly stays behind to fight Willie, supposedly dying in the process. From a photograph recovered by Matteo, Selena and Amber discover Willie had a wife whose disappearance drove him to madness, and he redirected the ferry in an effort to search for her. Selena has Amber take Matteo to safety while she uses a trunk of theatre costumes to dress up as Willie's mate. Amber battles Willie until Selena arrives. Willie knocks Matteo into the ocean and pulls Selena back to safety. Amber distracts Willie, which allows Selena to stab him in his head with a pair of scissors, sending him falling into the ocean depths.

Matteo is pulled to safety by a rescue boat and reunites with his father, Molinari, who informs Selena and Amber that they are the only known survivors of Willie's killing spree aboard the ferry. Amber convinces Selena that the experience has hardened her as a New Yorker, so Selena decides to remain in the city to pursue her dream of becoming an artist. During the credits, Pete is seen radioing for help, implying that he is still alive.

== Cast ==
- David Howard Thornton as Steamboat Willie
- Allison Pittel as Selena
- Jesse Posey as Pete
- Amy Schumacher as EMT Amber
- Jesse Kove as Lieutenant Diaz
- Kailey Hyman as Cindi
- Rumi C. Jean-Louis as Matteo
- Jarod Lindsey as Moses
- Sarah Kopkin as Ilsa Arindel
- Savannah Whitten as Ariana
- Stephanie Bates as Bella
- Poonam Basu as Jazzy
- Allie Seibold as Rory
- Allyson Sereboff as Aubrey
- Jarlath Conroy as Barry
- Jared Johnston as Neil
- Charles Edwin Powell as Borough President Molinari

Tyler Posey, Brian Quinn, and Joe DeRosa make cameos.

== Production ==
=== Background ===
In an interview at Gizmodo's io9, director Steven LaMorte said of himself and co-writer Matthew Garcia-Dunn that a widespread preconceived notion was that they do not like the Disney brand, but he calls himself "a deep-cuts Disney fanboy." LaMorte explained that he had always wanted to be an Imagineer, and he admired Walt Disney as an inventor.

After Steamboat Willie's copyright lapsed, LaMorte began working on a then-untitled horror film based on the short. The film was later announced with the first teaser. The official title, Screamboat, was officially revealed in April 2024. The puppet and costume for Thornton's mouse creature character was designed by Quantum Creation FX.

=== Writing ===
LaMorte said in a March 18, 2025 Instagram post that he and Garcia-Dunn planned the movie as their "twisted take on the iconic princesses."

The princesses featured are Cindi (Cinderella), Ariana (Ariel), Jazzy (Jasmine), Bella (Belle), Ilsa (Elsa), and Rory (Aurora). Amber, an EMT, is named for Princess Amber of Sofia the First. It was Garcia-Dunn's idea to incorporate the princesses, because LaMorte had seen such party groups on the Staten Island Ferry on weekend nights in his 20s. Other characters named for Disney characters are Pete, after the original short's antagonist Pegleg Pete, and Aubrey, for Audrey Rose, the daughter of Princess Aurora and Prince Phillip in Sleeping Beauty.

They included in the dialogue such Disney catchphrases as "It's a small world after all," "Be our guest," "Let it go," and "Dead men tell no tales." LaMorte said that some allusions were subtle, such as a Mary Poppins reference. He also framed an appearance of the number 33 for the Disney Parks' Club 33. Distribution company Iconic Events had earlier released the horror movies Cinderella's Revenge (2024) and Peter Pan's Neverland Nightmare (2025).

=== Casting ===
On June 10, 2024, some of the cast names were revealed, including Thornton as the main antagonist. In November 2024, Kailey Hyman was announced in a key role, and cameos are played by Tyler Posey and comedians Brian Quinn and Joe DeRosa.

=== Filming ===
Principal photography began in May 2024 and concluded in summer of the same year.

Steven LaMorte told The New York Post, "I'm from Staten Island, and I've always wanted to make a horror movie on the Staten Island ferry — you know, a slasher or murder mystery." He said, "I did a little research and [found out] the Staten Island ferry was once powered by steam" (which is used for murder in a scene). The Post explains,

Once on the boat, LaMorte was devoted to authenticity, knowing that locals could sense if something was off. "As a New Yorker, you just know. You can just tell. You can smell when it's Canada; you can just feel it when it is not right." So the details of the ferry were meticulously tended to, down to the accents you hear from Willie's victims, to shooting in the actual terminal with cooperation from the city [...] To prep, LaMorte and his wife, Amy Schumacher, who also stars in the movie and acts as producer, rode the normal ferry constantly — 15 to 20 times on one day alone — to explore all the possibilities for cartoon carnage. "We were looking at all the little hatches. Where could a mouse come from? Or what's a great place for a potential scene to happen? But once we got there and we were able to see the areas the public doesn't get to see, that's when things got really interesting. Because we're walking around this surprisingly massive engine room, or being in the captain's deck where we're doing some of those iconic Steamboat Willie moments. So that's our steamboat, there's our monster and what better backdrop to have for our killer, murderous, mischievous mouse movie than the Staten Island ferry with the New York City skyline in the background?"

After an interview with producer Michael Leavy, a lifelong Staten Island resident, SILive reported that "Islanders should watch out for Easter eggs specific to the ferry, and hometown names that only locals will pick up on. (Hint: the snack counter)." One of these was the Staten Island Ferry's Liberty Café. Leavy told SILive,

Being from Staten Island, we really wanted to showcase how the real commute on the Staten Island Ferry is — you know, the one that we took when we were younger going to and from the city. Some of the slang, mannerisms and people were based off of real people that we had seen on the ferry in our commutes over the years. I'm so proud of Staten Island, and any chance Fuzz on the Lens gets to shoot something on Staten Island, we're going to take that opportunity to do it. We love showcasing our Island.

Cinematograper Steven Della Salle also told SILive, "It's not a set. There's no faking it. This is the boat that everybody took to work, so when they see it, they're gonna know, like, 'I remember that,' and that's what's awesome for us."

Nearly all of the movie takes place aboard the ferry, though some filming shows the New York Harbor for background. The 4Filming site reports that the filmmakers chose to shoot many scenes on location in New York City to give Screamboat a realistic feel for the fantasy and horror elements of the film. Many aerial shots feature Manhattan's skyscrapers. Establishing shots were filmed at the Staten Island Ferry Whitehall Terminal. The ferry used in the film is owned by Colin Jost and Pete Davidson. TMZ reported that the Saturday Night Live stars provided their bright orange, decommissioned Staten Island ferry, on which "so much fake blood was used during filming they had to hire a special cleaning crew." For a brief scene at the Staten Island Ferry's Liberty Café, LaMorte directed that the props department use "the genuine cheap beer being served" there. Among the devices that Willie uses for his murders are a forklift, a blowtorch, fake ears, and a harpoon.

SILive said that the characters were based on all types of common New York commuters: loud party girls, street performers, bench sleepers and Midwest transplants. Variety notes that the costumes are color-coded: Cindi is dressed in blue, Bella in yellow, Jazzy in turquoise, and so on. The film includes a character known as The Shirtless Cowboy, a variation on the Naked Cowboy of Times Square and a Peter Pan-dressed character. There is also a man dressed as the Statue of Liberty and police officers in uniforms.

== Release ==
Screamboat was theatrically released by Iconic Events Releasing on April 2, 2025. The April 1 advance premiere was held at the Regal Union Square in Manhattan, New York. The film will be released on home video by DeskPop Entertainment. The release was originally scheduled for January 24, 2025. In February 2025, Signature Entertainment acquired distribution rights for the United Kingdom and Ireland.

== Reception ==
Screamboat received mixed reviews from critics. On the review aggregator website Rotten Tomatoes, 51% of 35 critics' reviews are positive. Metacritic, which uses a weighted average, assigned the film a score of 44 out of 100, based on 6 critics, indicating "mixed or average" reviews.

After the April 1, 2025, Manhattan premiere, SILive reported that "with David Howard Thornton prancing around the boat as the title role of Willie, this horror-comedy had the theater roaring with laughter."

Peter Debruge of Variety finds the movie fun, "as there's an illicit thrill in desecrating powerful brands, like Disney." Debruge described its manner as "[c]hanneling the 'splatstick' vibe of directors like Peter Jackson and Eli Roth with decidedly far-from-G-rated gags." He concludes, "The murders may be grisly, but they're played almost entirely for laughs, as are the tossed-off references to any number of Disney movies. [...] In what must have been a favor to someone, Tyler Posey pops up, manning the radio in a few no-value-added scenes, including a mid-credits tease for a possible sequel. Unnecessary as that may be, it still sounds less disrespectful to the original IP than so many of the Disney-sanctioned live-action reboots."

Brian Tallerico of RogerEbert.com gave the film two out of four stars and wrote, "It's hard to imagine anyone stumbling into Screamboat without being aware of its intentions. It's not something people buy a ticket to when their arthouse movie of choice isn't available. On that level, it almost works enough to recommend even to those not clamoring to see it." The Bloody Disgusting site, in a 2 out of 5 points review, says that the cartoonish violence "is enough to make a Disney purist rage and a Disney objector snicker." "Screamboat eagerly aims to please and gives its target audience exactly what they wanted. The kills don't always live up to the most imaginative of the collection, however, LaMorte gets points for enthusiasm and design. [...] It would be a mistake to overthink Screamboat or overlook its appeal as subversive slapstick, however, like so many comedy bits out there, this movie loses its novelty sooner than later."

In a list of the 10 most shocking and gory scenes of the movie, Screen Rant finds it "similar to the TCU and the Terrifier movies in the shocking level of gore." The reviewer comments that the special effects "team used practical effects, blood, and prosthetics that are as impressive as they are disturbing to look at. Ultimately, this decision paid off, giving Screamboat a campy, b-film slasher feeling." They add, "It's also nice to watch a slasher film where not every death happens in the same, predictable way."
