= Legendary (2010 film) =

2010 American sports drama film by Mel Damski

- Theatrical release poster
- Directed by: Mel Damski
- Written by: John Posey
- Produced by: Michael Pavone; David Calloway
- Starring: John Cena; Patricia Clarkson; Danny Glover; Devon Graye
- Cinematography: Kenneth Zunder
- Edited by: Mitch Stanley
- Music by: James A. Johnston
- Production company: WWE Studios
- Distributed by: Samuel Goldwyn Films
- Release date: September 10, 2010
- Running time: 107 minutes
- Country: United States
- Language: English
- Budget: $5 million
- Box office: $200,393

Legendary is a 2010 American sports drama film directed by Mel Damski. The film stars Devon Graye as a high school wrestler, in a cast that features John Cena, Patricia Clarkson, Danny Glover, Madeleine Martin, and Tyler Posey. The film was released on September 10, 2010.

== Plot ==
After being bullied, book smart but not street-wise teenager Cal Chetley (Devon Graye), joins his Oklahoma high school's wrestling team, seeing it as a way to reunite with his estranged and wayward older brother, Mike (John Cena). His mother, Sharon (Patricia Clarkson), is not initially supportive of Cal's decision, especially after learning that Mike is secretly coaching Cal from jail. She has been away and out of contact with Mike, her older son, for over a decade, but copes and watches as yet another family male becomes legendary.

== Cast ==
- John Cena as Mike Chetley
- Patricia Clarkson as Sharon Chetley
- Danny Glover as Harry "Red" Newman
- Devon Graye as Cal Chetley
- Madeleine Martin as Luli Stringfellow
- Tyler Posey as Billy Barrow
- John Posey as Coach Stu Tennent
- Teo Olivares as Donald Worthington
- Chris Whetstone as Mac Chetley

== Production ==
WWE Studios produced the film alongside Samuel Goldwyn Films. Filming took place at Alfred Bonnabel High School in Kenner, Louisiana, in December 2009.

== Music ==
Although no official soundtrack was released, the following songs appeared in the movie:

- "Blue Jeans" performed by Glass Cow
- "Crash" performed by Fit for Rivals
- "Dragonfly" performed by Shaman’s Harvest
- "Faith" performed by James A. Johnston & Laci Williams
- "Flash Lightnin’" performed by Flash Lightnin’
- "Hard Line" performed by James A. Johnston
- "Hustle, Loyalty, Respect" performed by John Cena and Freddie Foxxx (Also used in the trailer)
- "In the Morning" performed by Taddy Porter
- "It’s Your Last Shot" performed by Politics & Assassins
- "Letters from the Sky" performed by Civil Twilight
- "Liar" performed by Glasgow
- "One Night" performed by Golden State
- "Panis Angelicus" composed by Cesar Franch
- "Railroad Queen" performed by Taddy Porter
- "Take Back the Fear" performed by Hail the Villain
- "The Dream" composed and orchestrated by James A. Johnston with vocals by Jonathan Estabrook
- "Through Telescopes" performed by Colour Academy and also used in the trailer
- "Undertow" performed by Beta Wolf
- "We Must Start Again" performed by Golden State

The orchestral score, written, and composed by James A Johnston, is available on iTunes.

== Home media ==
The film was released on Blu-ray and DVD on September 28, 2010. The DVD is being sold exclusively at Walmart and the Blu-ray exclusively at Best Buy.

== Reception ==
Critics received the film poorly. On review aggregator website Rotten Tomatoes, the film holds an approval rating of 19% based on 43 reviews, and an average rating of 4.8/10. The website's critical consensus reads, "Maudlin, predictable, and clichéd, Legendary pins its talented cast under a heavy layer of formulaic schmaltz." On Metacritic, the film has a weighted average score of 39 out of 100, based on 17 critics, indicating "generally unfavorable" reviews.

Legendary failed to make the top ten at the box office in its only weekend in wide release, finishing with $200,393 in total.
