= Alive (2020 film) =

2020 film by Il-cho

#Alive
- Theatrical release poster
- Hangul: #살아있다
- RR: #saraitda
- MR: #saraitta
- Directed by: Cho Il-hyung
- Screenplay by: Cho Il-hyung; Matt Naylor
- Based on: Alone by Matt Naylor
- Produced by: Eugene Lee; Saemi Kim; Saerom Kim
- Starring: Yoo Ah-in; Park Shin-hye
- Cinematography: Won-ho Son
- Edited by: Min-kyeong Shin
- Music by: Tae-seong Kim
- Production companies: Zip Cinema; Perspective Pictures
- Distributed by: Lotte Entertainment; Netflix (International)
- Release date: June 24, 2020 (South Korea)
- Running time: 99 minutes
- Country: South Korea
- Language: Korean
- Box office: USD$14.7 million

#Alive (Korean: #살아있다; RR: #saraitda) is a 2020 South Korean post-apocalyptic action horror film directed by Cho Il-hyung. Starring Yoo Ah-in and Park Shin-hye, it is based on the 2019 script Alone by Matt Naylor (itself becoming another film), who co-adapted his script with Cho. The film revolves around a video game live streamer's struggle for survival as he is forced to stay alone in his apartment in Seoul during a zombie apocalypse. It was released in South Korea on June 24, 2020, and globally via Netflix on September 8, 2020. Critics generally gave positive reviews.

== Plot ==
Oh Joon-woo is alone in his family's apartment when zombies begin to attack and infect people outside. When he inspects the apartment hallway, a neighbor barges in. He begs to stay, but becomes a zombie and attacks Joon-woo. Joon-woo pushes him out and locks the door, then watches a large zombie attack his neighbor through the peephole. Joon-woo then receives messages from his parents telling him they are safe.

Joon-woo blocks his front door with the fridge and posts a rescue request on social media. By attaching his phone to a drone, he scouts his neighborhood and realizes it is now overrun. Though the emergency power stays on, Joon-woo gradually loses access to phone networks, the internet, and running water.

One night, Joon-woo sees zombies taking down a police officer outside. He screams at them, leading a zombie to break into the apartment and knock over the fridge, destroying the food. Joon-woo lures it into falling off the balcony. He resorts to drinking liquor to survive, but hallucinates about his family due to hunger and thirst. When the phone network is momentarily restored, Joon-woo receives a voicemail from his family recording their refuge being overrun. His rage causes him to leave the apartment and attack zombies, but when a horde attacks, he flees and barely manages to sneak back inside.

Joon-woo attempts to hang himself, but stops when he sees a laser pointer's light. The signal comes from Kim Yoo-bin, a survivor living in the opposite apartment building. Yoo-bin tries to set up a zip line between their apartments by tying a cable to her table and throwing the other end to Joon-woo, but it lands in the street. Joon-woo uses his drone to set up another line successfully, but an infected firefighter pulls on the first cable, causing Yoo-bin's table to fly across her apartment, knock her out, and lodge into her balcony railing. The zombie starts climbing the cable. Joon-woo distracts him by sacrificing his drone, giving Yoo-bin enough time to wake up and kill the zombie.

Joon-woo raids his neighbor's unit for food, clothing, and walkie-talkies, narrowly avoiding his zombified neighbor. He sends a walkie-talkie to Yoo-bin, and the two talk and bond. Suddenly, the infected hordes become agitated and a nervous Yoo-bin accidentally knocks over a shelf. The noise causes zombies to converge at her door. Joon-woo distracts them by calling the unit adjacent to hers.

Yoo-bin says the 8th floor of Joon-woo's apartment looks empty. The pair gear up, rappel from their balconies, and fight their way to the 8th floor, but the doors are locked and the zombies have followed them. Suddenly, a stranger emerges from the last suite on the floor and saves them. He gives them food and water, but it is drugged, and Joon-woo falls asleep. The stranger binds the pair's wrists and locks Yoo-bin in a bedroom with his restrained, infected wife. Joon-woo wakes up and threatens the stranger, but he releases his wife's restraints from outside the bedroom. Once Yoo-bin goes silent, the stranger opens the bedroom door, only to find Yoo-bin having wrapped the infected wife's head in fabric. The infected wife attacks her husband, and Yoo-bin shoots them both.

The gunshots attract more zombies. Yoo-bin asks Joon-woo to kill her before they get in. As he hesitates, they hear helicopters outside. The pair rush to the rooftop, chased by the infected. Just before they are overwhelmed, an army helicopter holds off the zombies and carries the pair to safety. A voiceover by an anchor explains wireless networks are being restored and the military is rescuing survivors who made social media posts. The film ends with Joon-woo's social media post's hashtag "#StayAlive" changing its wording to "#Alive".

== Cast ==
- Yoo Ah-in as Oh Joon-woo, a gamer who struggles to survive a zombie outbreak.
- Park Shin-hye as Kim Yoo-bin, a female tenant of Joon-woo's apartment building who helps him survive. She frequently kills trespassing zombies using a hand axe and booby-trapped door.
- Jeon Bae-soo as a masked man who saves Joon-woo and Yoo-bin but wants to feed them to his zombified wife.
- Lee Hyun-wook as Lee Sang-chul, the infected tenant whom Joon-woo lets in.
- Oh Hye-won as the policewoman who is turned into a zombie by the infected.
- Jin So-yeon as Elena Kim
- Lee Chae-kyung as the zombified wife of the masked man

=== English dubbing ===
The English version was produced by Igloo Music in Burbank, California. Jason Cho adapted the script and Harry Buerkle directed the dub.

Role	Actor	Voice actor
Oh Joon-woo	Yoo Ah-in	Kevin Ho
Kim Yoo-bin	Park Shin-hye	Nicole Jia
Lee Sang-chul	Lee Hyun-wook	Bobo Chang
Elena Kim	Jin So-yeon	Elizabeth Jee

== Production ==
#Alive is a zombie thriller based on the original script "#Alone" of Hollywood screenwriter Matt Naylor, who worked on the American documentary series Small Business Revolution: Main Street and the short film What It's Like. Director Cho Il-hyung (also known as Il Cho) and Naylor adapted the screenplay together for the Korean market. In 2019, ZIP Cinema and U.S. producer Perspective Pictures joined the production with Lotte Entertainment distributing the film.

On July 11, 2019, Yoo Ah-in and Park Shin-hye joined the cast, followed by Lee Hyun-wook on September 16. The read-through of the script occurred on September 27, 2019.

Principal photography began on October 1, 2019. Filming took place in Gunsan and wrapped up on December 12, 2019.

=== Music ===
The full musical score was composed by Kim Tae-sung which he co-arranged with Choi Jung-in, Shin Hyun-pil, Park Sang-woo and Yoo Chae-young.

Songs not featured on the official soundtrack:

- Break by Beenzino
- Sail by Inni
- #Alive by Inni

== Release ==
The film was released in South Korea on June 24, 2020. In May, an Instagram account for the character Oh Joon-woo was created to promote the film. In August, Netflix acquired the international distribution rights to the film, which was later released worldwide on September 8, 2020. Following its release, #Alive entered the all-time Netflix top 10 non-English language movies but has since dropped out with 54.62 million hours watched in the first 28 days.

== Reception ==
=== Box office ===
On its opening day in South Korea, #Alive drew in a total of 204,071 viewers and took 62% of the box office, marking the highest first-day viewership of any film since February 2020 after the outbreak of the COVID-19 pandemic in South Korea. It held the highest number of first-day admissions next to The Man Standing Next.

On the fifth day of its release, #Alive surpassed 1 million admissions, and during the first weekend of its release, it garnered 1,001,802 viewers, securing the first place at the box office for its first weekend. It became the first film to surpass 1 million since February 2020. It also ranked first at the box office for the first three weekends, and has achieved over 1,903,992 admissions in South Korea as of December 2020.

The film premiered on Netflix on 8 September 2020, and two days after release, it achieved global first place on the platform. #Alive topped the Netflix daily chart in 35 countries, including the United States, France, Spain, Sweden, Russia, Australia, Pakistan, and Canada. It became the first Korean film to top Netflix Movies Worldwide chart. By December 2020, #Alive was in the top 10 list in 90 countries, making it one of the most-loved titles globally on Netflix in 2020 and also the most popular horror title of 2020 across Asia.

=== Critical response ===
On the review aggregator website Rotten Tomatoes, 88% of 25 critics' reviews are positive, with an average rating of 6.8/10. The website's consensus reads: "Well-acted, genuinely unsettling, and occasionally even funny, #Alive proves the crowded zombie genre still has fresh stories to tell." Korean review aggregator website Naver Movie Database assigned the film a score of 6.89 out of 10.

Marian Phillips from Screen Rant wrote, "#Alive accurately captures the same panic, fear, uncertainty, loneliness, and isolation experienced by many during the pandemic's early days. [...] By taking a concept unfamiliar to the sub-genre, #Alive transforms how zombie movies can be handled as well as providing an exploration of the different circumstances individuals find themselves when dealing with the apocalypse." Anthony Kao from Cinema Escapist suggested, "#Alive is an entertaining zombie flick that seems tailor-made for the time of coronavirus. [...] On top of its empathetic and socially relevant depiction of the Korean millennial condition, #Alive presents a narrative that feels unpretentious and accessibly entertaining." The New York Times' Elisabeth Vincentelli concluded, "#Alive is a nifty little thriller that proves that you can always find signs of life in the most undead of genres. And the finale, far-fetched as it is, suggests that even a society atomized by isolation can find a connection".

== Awards and nominations ==
Awards	Category	Recipient	Result	Ref.
2020 Cine 21 Awards	Best Actor	Yoo Ah-in	Won	

== See also ==
- Alone (2020 horror film), based on the same script
