= Tyler Posey =

American actor and musician (born 1991)

- Posey in 2026
- Born: Tyler Garcia-Posey; October 18, 1991 (age 35); Santa Monica, California, U.S.
- Occupations: Actor; musician
- Years active: 2000–present
- Spouse: Phem (m. 2023)
- Father: John Posey
- Relatives: Jesse Posey (brother)

Tyler Garcia-Posey (born October 18, 1991) is an American actor and musician. He began his career as a child actor and received recognition for his role as Raul Garcia in Doc (2001–2004) and Ty Ventura in Maid in Manhattan (2002). As an adult, he gained further prominence for playing the central character Scott McCall in the MTV drama series Teen Wolf (2011–2017), which earned him a number of youth acting awards, including a Teen Choice Award. He has since been cast in a number of film roles and has also performed in voice acting roles. He was active for several years in the band Lost in Kostko, which he co-founded in 2009.

== Early life ==
Posey was born in Santa Monica, California, to Cyndi Terese Garcia and actor-writer John Posey. He grew up in Santa Clarita, California. Posey has one older brother and one younger brother. He is of Mexican descent on his mother's side.

== Career ==
Posey has worked steadily in film and television. In February 2002, he appeared in the film Collateral Damage; in December of that year, he played the main character's son in the romantic comedy Maid in Manhattan. He auditioned for the role of Jacob Black in the Twilight film series in 2007 but lost the role to his friend Taylor Lautner. The two regularly auditioned for the same roles as child actors.

In 2011, Posey was cast in his breakout role as the lead in the MTV television series Teen Wolf, which is based on the 1985 film. Posey plays high school student Scott McCall, who is bitten by a werewolf and must keep this fact secret while protecting his loved ones from a host of supernatural threats and beings. That same year, Posey voiced a character in the pilot of the Disney original cartoon SheZow, which aired on May 4 as a part of the Shorty McShorts' Shorts miniseries. He also co-starred in the 2012 film White Frog. In 2015, he became a co-producer for the fifth season of Teen Wolf. In 2016, it was announced at San Diego Comic-Con that Teen Wolf would end in 2017 after the completion of its sixth season. His work garnered him two Teen Choice Awards, a Young Hollywood Award, an ALMA Award and nominations for a Saturn Award and People's Choice Award.

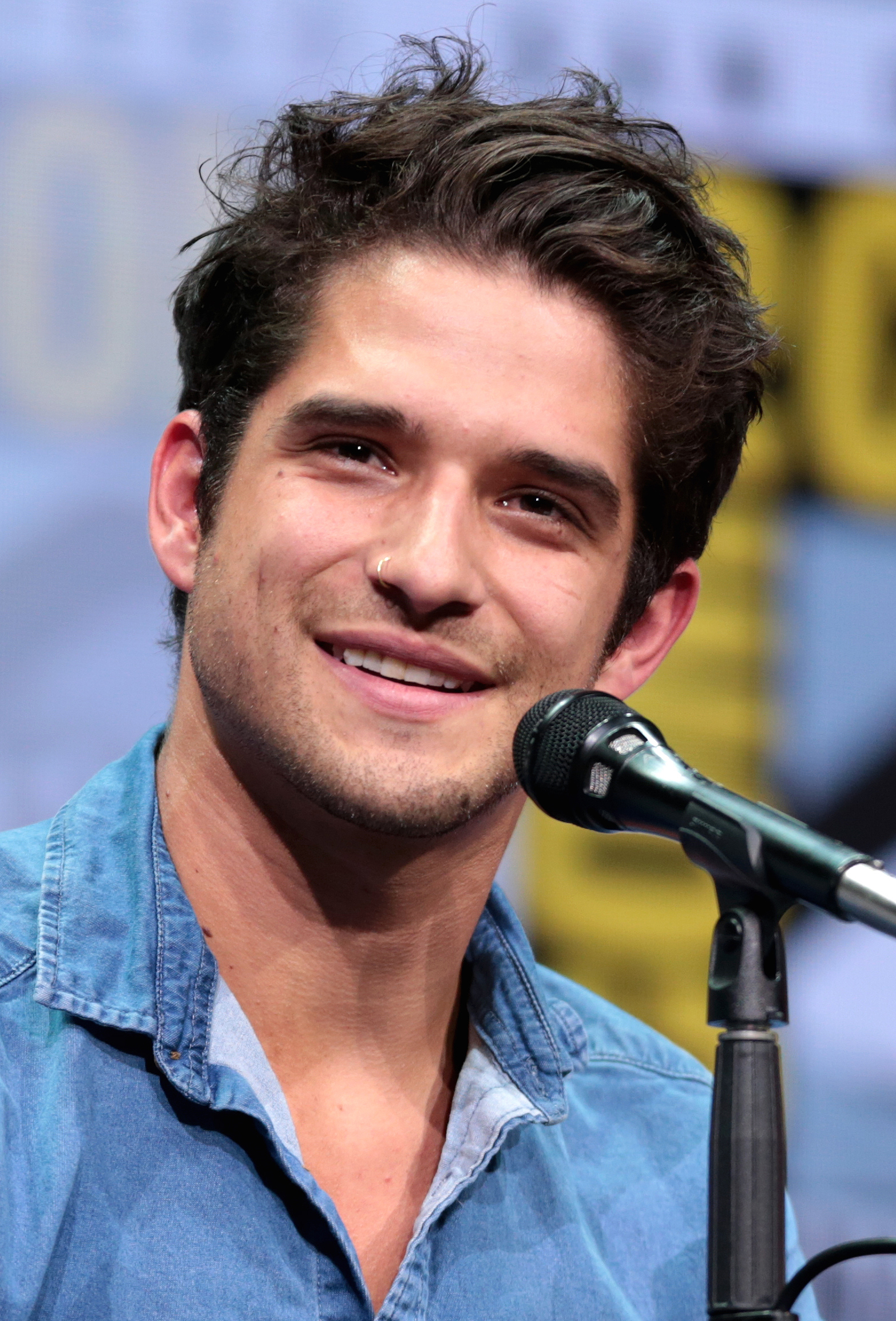
Posey at the 2017 San Diego Comic-Con

On May 24, 2017, Posey was cast as Lucas Moreno in the Blumhouse supernatural thriller film Truth or Dare. The film was released in theaters on April 13, 2018. On September 25, 2017, it was announced that Posey would join the third season of the VH1 slasher television series Scream, starring in the role of Shane. The season premiered on July 8, 2019.

On February 20, 2019, it was announced that Posey would star as Michael Emerson in the CW's television reboot series of The Lost Boys. On July 29, 2019, it was announced the CW was unhappy with the pilot and that Posey, along with most of the rest of the cast, would be recast.

On November 18, 2019, it was reported that Posey would star in Netflix's animated Fast & Furious television series Fast & Furious: Spy Racers, which premiered on December 26, 2019. In that same year, he co-starred as Ricky in the Netflix film The Last Summer. In 2020, Posey starred in the horror film Alone.

In September 2021, it was announced that a reunion film for Teen Wolf had been ordered by Paramount+, with Jeff Davis returning as a screenwriter and executive producer of the film. The majority of the original cast members, including Posey, were set to reprise their roles, with Posey also serving as a producer. The film was released on January 26, 2023.

In 2023, Posey competed in season ten of The Masked Singer as "Hawk". He was eliminated on "Harry Potter Night". In the following year, Posey appeared as one of the cast members on MTV's reality TV show The Surreal Life. He also voiced the character Javi in the audiobook Know Your Newlywed that year.

=== Other work ===
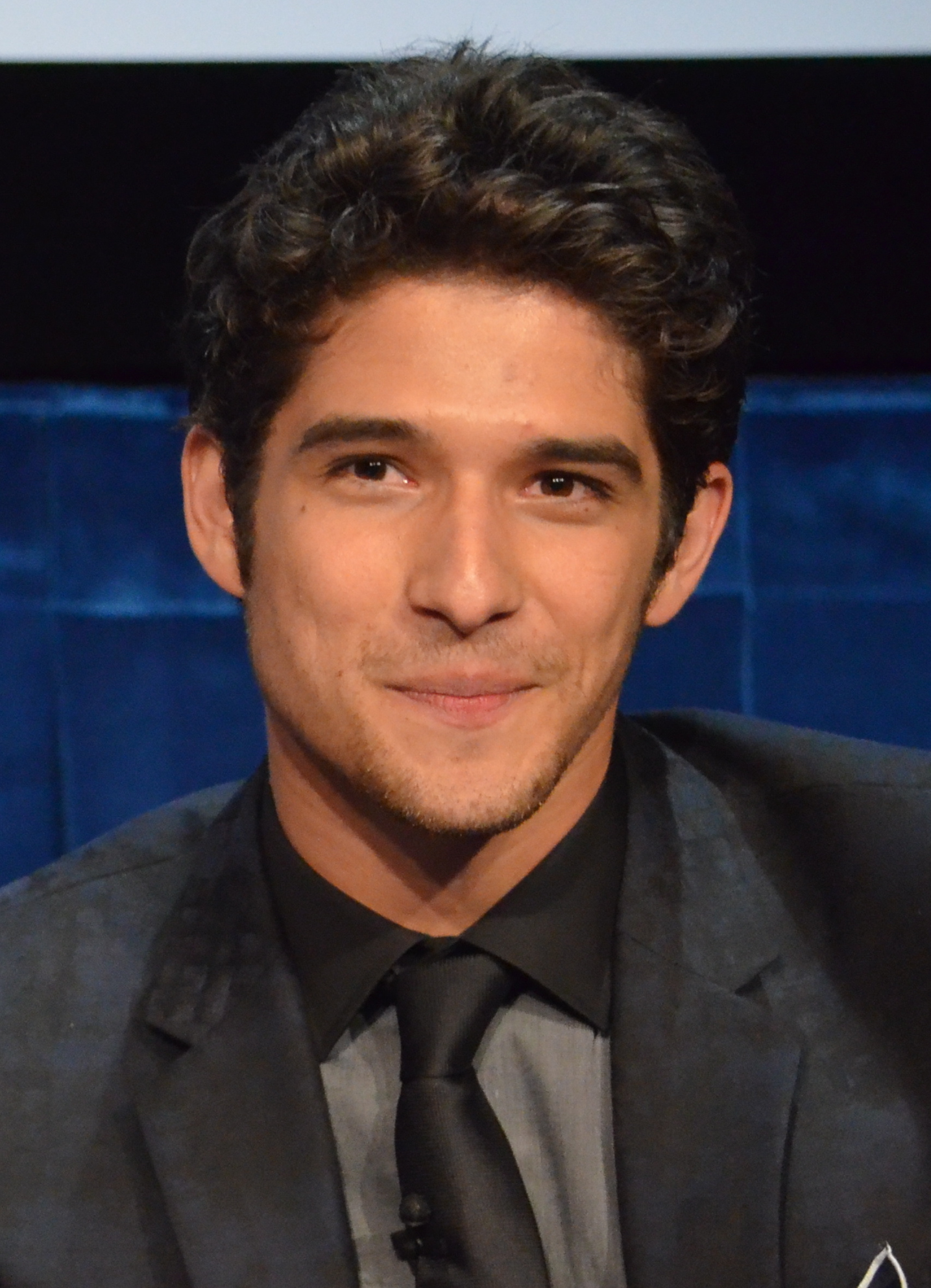
Posey in 2012

Posey used to front and play guitar in the band Disappearing Jamie, formerly known as Lost in Kostko. Their first performance was at the Roxy in Los Angeles in 2012. Lost in Kostko released their eight-track EP You're Going to Need a Towel in 2011. Posey announced the band's breakup via Instagram on July 17, 2013.

In December 2016, Posey was a guest DJ at Emo Nite LA's second anniversary at the Echoplex in Los Angeles.

Posey played guitar and contributed vocals in the pop punk band PVMNTS along with guitarist/bassist/vocalist Freddy Ramirez and drummer Nick Guzman. The trio released the song "Standing (On My Own Two Feet)" on June 14, 2018, on which Posey wrote about the passing of his mother in 2014. The band self-released their six-track EP Better Days on August 17, 2018. In April 2019, it was announced that Posey had left the band and was pursuing another music venture, which became the band Five North.

Five North is a pop-punk rock band formed by childhood best friends Posey and Kyle Murphy. Posey and Murphy originate from just off "the 5" (Interstate 5 in California) in Santa Clarita, California, hence the origin of the band's name Five North. The two recruited Makeout drummer Scott Eckel after being introduced by music producer and close friend John Feldmann. Five North's debut single "This Mess" was released on October 4, 2019, and their debut eight-track EP Scumbag was released on March 6, 2020, via Big Noise Music Group.

In August 2021, Posey made a cameo appearance in the music video for "Broke", the song by UK pop-punk band the Bottom Line, who Posey met when touring the UK together in 2018 during his time in PVMNTS.

== Personal life ==
Posey became engaged to his childhood sweetheart, Seana Gorlick, in 2013. The couple broke off the engagement that same year after a ten-year relationship.

Posey's mother, Cyndi Terese Garcia, died of breast cancer in December 2014. The fifth season of Teen Wolf was dedicated to her memory.

In an October 2020 interview, Posey disclosed that he had begun smoking marijuana at the age of 12 and had developed an addiction. At that time, Posey stated that he had been sober for 71 days. In March 2021, Posey stated that he was no longer sober but added that he had learned a great deal from his experience of sobriety.

Also in October 2020, Posey revealed that he had "hooked up" with men and does not like to label his sexuality. In an interview on SiriusXM, Posey said, "I was hit with wanting to come out myself and be honest about it. I know a lot of kids look up to me, and I want to get rid of that stigma." In July 2021, Posey came out as queer and sexually fluid.

Posey started dating singer Phem in 2020, and in February 2022, they announced their engagement. They married in October 2023.

== Filmography ==
=== Film ===
Key
†	Denotes films that have not yet been released

Year	Title	Role	Notes
2002	Collateral Damage	Mauro	
2002	Maid in Manhattan	Ty Ventura	
2005	Inside Out	Obert	
2007	Veritas, Prince of Truth	Mouse Gonzalez	
2010	Legendary	Billy Barrow	
2012	White Frog	Doug	
2013	Scary Movie 5	David	
2016	Yoga Hosers	Gordon Greenleaf	
2018	Taco Shop	Smokes	
2018	Truth or Dare	Lucas Moreno	
2019	The Last Summer	Ricky Santos	
2020	Alone	Aidan	Also executive producer
2023	Teen Wolf: The Movie	Scott McCall	Also producer
2024	The Real Bros of Simi Valley: The Movie	Jatthew	
2024	Queen of the Ring	G. Bill	
2025	Screamboat	Radio Operator Mike	
TBA	Death of a Brewer	TBA	

=== Television ===
Year	Title	Role	Notes
2001–2004	Doc	Raul Garcia	Main role
2002	Without a Trace	Robert	Episode: "Silent Partner"
2005	Into the West	Young Abe Wheeler	Episode: "Dreams and Schemes"
2005	Sue Thomas: F.B.Eye	Danny Abas	Episode: "Boy Meets World"
2006	Smallville	Javier Ramirez	Episode: "Subterranean"
2006–2007	Brothers & Sisters	Gabriel Whedon / Gabriel Traylor	Recurring role
2007	Shorty McShorts' Shorts	Jose (voice)	Episode: "SheZow"
2009	Lincoln Heights	Andrew Ortega	Recurring role
2011–2017	Teen Wolf	Scott McCall	Main role; also director (episode: "After Images")
2013	Workaholics	Billy Belk	Episode: "Fourth and Inches"
2014	The Exes	Eric	Episode: "The Hand That Rocks the Cradle"
2014–2015	Wolf Watch	Himself	Correspondent and guest
2015	Ridiculousness	Himself	Season 6, episode 21
2016	Lip Sync Battle	Himself	Episode: "Gigi Hadid vs. Tyler Posey"
2016–2018; 2020	Elena of Avalor	Prince Alonso (voice)	Recurring role
2017	Hell's Kitchen	Himself	Guest diner and Leukemia & Lymphoma Society contributor (episode: "It's All Gravy")
2017	Jane the Virgin	Adam Eduardo Alvaro	Guest role (season 3); recurring role (season 4)
2018	Marvel Rising: Secret Warriors	Dante Pertuz / Inferno, Kree Guard 1 (voice)	Television film
2018	Sideswiped	Griffin	Episode: "Baby Steps"
2019	Marvel Rising: Battle of the Bands	Dante Pertuz / Inferno (voice)	Television special
2019	Marvel Rising: Chasing Ghosts	Dante Pertuz / Inferno (voice)	Television special
2019	Marvel Rising: Heart of Iron	Dante Pertuz / Inferno (voice)	Television special
2019	Sherwood	Iniko (voice)	Main role
2019	Now Apocalypse	Gabriel	Recurring role
2019	Scream: Resurrection	Shane	Main role
2019–2021	Fast & Furious Spy Racers	Tony Toretto (voice)	Main role
2021	Nickelodeon's Unfiltered	Himself	Episode: "Strong Beef & Flying Teeth!"
2023	The Masked Singer	Hawk	Season 10 contestant
2024	The Surreal Life	Himself	Main role (season 8)
2024	The Real Full Monty	Himself	Male stripper
2025	Murder in a Small Town	Ryan Coogan	Episode: "Strangers Among Us"
2026	Line of Fire	Brandon Hayes	Guest role (Season 1)

=== Music videos ===
Year	Title	Artist
2011	"Our Deal"	Best Coast
2015	"Young & Stupid"	Travis Mills
2015	"Secrets"	State Champs
2016	"Colors"	Halsey
2021	"Broke"	The Bottom Line
2021	"Past Life"	Tyler Posey
2022	"Everybody But You"	State Champs featuring Ben Barlow
2022	"Life is What We're Living (Mahalo Remix)"	Riotron
2025	"Gasoline"	Halsey
2025	"Drive"	Halsey
2026	"Do Me Right"	Mr. Fantasy

== Discography ==
=== Solo ===
- Drugs (EP, 2021)
- Unravel (album, 2023)

=== With Lost in Kostko ===
- You're Gonna Need a Towel (EP, 2011)

=== With Pvmnts ===
- Better Days (EP, 2018)

=== With Five North ===
- Scumbag (EP, 2020)

== Other credits ==
=== Video games ===
Year	Title	Role
2021	Fast & Furious Spy Racers: Rise of SH1FT3R	Tony Toretto (voice)

== Awards and nominations ==
Award	Year (Note: Where available, value is linked to the article for the specific ceremony)	Category	Work	Result	Ref.
ALMA Award	2012	Favorite TV Actor – Leading Role	Teen Wolf	Won	
Imagen Awards	2012	Best Actor/Television	Teen Wolf	Won	
Movieguide Awards	2005	Most Inspiring Television Acting	Doc	Won	
People's Choice Awards	2017	Favorite Sci-Fi/Fantasy TV Actor	Teen Wolf	Nominated	
Saturn Awards	2017	Best Performance by a Younger Actor in a Television Series	Teen Wolf	Nominated	
Teen Choice Awards	2011	Choice Summer TV Star: Male	Teen Wolf	Nominated	
Teen Choice Awards	2011	Choice TV: Breakout Star	Teen Wolf	Nominated	
Teen Choice Awards	2012	Choice Summer TV Star: Male	Teen Wolf	Won	
Teen Choice Awards	2013	Choice Summer TV Star: Male	Teen Wolf	Nominated	
Teen Choice Awards	2014	Choice TV Actor: Fantasy/Sci-Fi	Teen Wolf	Nominated	
Teen Choice Awards	2015	Choice Summer TV Star: Male	Teen Wolf	Nominated	
Teen Choice Awards	2016	Choice Summer TV Star: Male	Teen Wolf	Nominated	
Teen Choice Awards	2017	Choice Summer TV Actor: Male	Teen Wolf	Won	
Young Artist Awards	2002	Best Performance in a TV Comedy Series – Supporting Young Actor	Doc	Won	
Young Artist Awards	2004	Best Performance in a TV Series (Comedy or Drama) – Supporting Young Actor	Doc	Nominated	
Young Hollywood Awards	2013	Best Ensemble (Note: Shared with Holland Roden, Crystal Reed, Dylan O'Brien and Tyler Hoechlin)	Teen Wolf	Won	
