= Jesse Posey =

American actor and producer (born 1994)

- Born: November 3, 1994 (age 31); Santa Clarita, California, U.S.
- Occupations: Actor, producer, filmmaker
- Years active: 2015–present
- Father: John Posey
- Relatives: Tyler Posey (brother)

Jesse Posey (born November 3, 1994) is an American actor, producer, and filmmaker. He is known for portraying musician Chris Pérez in the Netflix biographical drama Selena: The Series (2020–2021). Posey has also appeared in Teen Wolf: The Movie (2023), Station 19, NCIS, Intermedium, First Love, and the 2025 horror comedy Screamboat.

== Early life and education ==
Posey was born and raised in Santa Clarita, California, a suburb of Los Angeles. He is the son of actor and writer John Posey and Cyndi Garcia Posey (1959–2014). He has three siblings, including actor and musician Tyler Posey. He attended William S. Hart High School in Santa Clarita California.

Before pursuing acting, Posey was an accomplished baseball pitcher in high school and college. He attended College of the Canyons, where he played for the Cougars baseball team after transferring from Allan Hancock College.

== Career ==
Posey began his acting career in the mid-2010s, appearing in short films and independent productions. His breakout role came in 2020 when he was cast as Chris Pérez, the husband of singer Selena Quintanilla, in Netflix's Selena: The Series. His performance drew positive attention for its authenticity and emotional depth.

He went on to appear in several television series and films, including guest roles in NCIS and Station 19. In 2023, Posey portrayed Raymond Delgado in Teen Wolf: The Movie, based on the popular MTV television series that starred his brother Tyler Posey.

In 2025, he took on a leading role in the horror-comedy film Screamboat, where he discussed the challenges of filming on water and balancing horror with humor in interviews.

== Personal life ==
He is the younger brother of actor Tyler Posey and has collaborated with him at fan conventions, including Screen Break: The Pilot Episode (2025), where both brothers appeared for photo sessions and meet-and-greets.

== Filmography ==
=== Film ===
Year	Title	Role
2019	Intermedium	–
2022	First Love	–
2023	Teen Wolf: The Movie	Raymond Delgado
2025	Screamboat	–

Television

Year	Title	Role
2017	Stitchers	Young Fred Overmeyer
2019	NCIS	Emmanuel Vela
2020	Station 19	–
2020–2021	Selena: The Series	Chris Pérez
