= The Heart Attack =

- Seinfeld episode
- Episode no.: Season 2 Episode 8
- Directed by: Tom Cherones
- Written by: Larry Charles
- Production code: 211
- Original air date: April 25, 1991

Guest appearances
- Stephen Tobolowsky as Tor Eckman; John Posey as Dr. Fein; John Fleck as Attendant; Jimmy Woodard as Driver; Pat Hazell as Man in Other Bed; Sharon McNight as The Nurse; Thomas Wagner as The Cook; Heather James as The Waitress; Larry David as Screaming B-movie Actor (uncredited)

Episode chronology
← Previous "The Revenge"	Next → "The Deal"
- Seinfeld season 2

"The Heart Attack" is the eighth episode of the second season of the American sitcom Seinfeld, and the show's 13th episode overall. It aired on NBC on April 25, 1991.

== Plot ==
While Jerry dozes on his couch, the TV shows a science fiction B movie in which a mad scientist sets planets on fire and raves to "Sigmund" that they are like "flaming globes." Later that night he awakens briefly and scribbles an idea for his comedy act.

The next day, at Monk's, Jerry and Elaine cannot read Jerry's handwriting. As George adds an "outside cucumber" to his salad, he complains of sudden shortness of breath, pains, and partial paralysis. Jerry thinks he has illness anxiety from watching a PBS documentary on heart attacks, but, seeing George's panic, calls an ambulance. George's crisis does not distract him from trying to dispute the food bill.

George shares a hospital room with an irritable man, and bemoans never getting ice cream after his childhood tonsillectomy. Jerry confirms that the heart attack was imaginary, but he and Elaine prank George by calling dibs on his belongings and his ex. Wallowing in self-pity, George asks to be smothered with a pillow, but is horrified when Jerry jokingly obliges. George vows to start living harmoniously, but the others pay him no heed.

The attending doctor gives George a clean bill of health except that his tonsils need to be removed again. The doctor and Elaine flirt, sidelining George. Kramer, arriving belatedly after loading up on cafeteria food, denounces the "medical establishment" and pressures George to pass up surgery for holistic healer Tor Eckman—who just got out of jail.

Balking at surgery costing thousands, George agrees to meet Eckman for only $38. Jerry, failing to dissuade George, comes along for comedy material—and for "cosmic" intuition on his own scribbles. Eckman criticizes George's birth month and bans him from showering with hot water, then serves him tea with cramp bark, cleavers, and couch grass while putting him in a pyramid.

George has an allergic attack and turns bright purple. He is rushed to the hospital again, but the ambulance EMT accuses the driver of stealing a piece of Chuckles from him. George, Jerry, and Kramer are dumbfounded as the driver stops to beat up the EMT, then drives off without him. Still fighting mad, the driver crashes.

Elaine's date with the doctor ends with him holding her by the tongue while lecturing on tongue anatomy. Elaine is quickly turned off.

George ends up in a neck brace for whiplash, speechless from having his tonsils out, and slathered with antihistamine cream, and still gets no ice cream. Jerry, also in a neck brace, notes that he will pay much more than originally planned. Meanwhile, Kramer has gone to Eckman for treatment. The B movie comes on TV again, and Jerry realizes that he wrote down "flaming globes of Sigmund," which isn't funny at all. George is grateful when Elaine brings him ice cream, but ends up throwing it to silence the irritable man.

== Production ==
"The Heart Attack" was written by Larry Charles. Like George, Charles's tonsils grew back after they were removed. He was inspired to write the ambulance scene by a news report about an ambulance driver and EMT who stopped an ambulance in the middle of traffic so that they could get out and have a fist fight, leaving a dying patient in the back.

The doctor's tongue fetish was more extreme in Charles' original draft, but these scenes were cut over concerns that they were too dark.

Jerry's line "You're not a doctor, but you play one in real life" is a play on a famous line from a 1986 commercial for cough syrup: "I’m not a doctor, but I play one on TV."

In a bizarre coincidence, the episode seemingly makes an outlandish prediction when Jerry attempts to have Tor translate the note he wrote. Upon examining it, Tor laughs and mutters "Cleveland 117, San Antonio 109", leaving Jerry even more baffled. Twenty-eight years after the episode aired, the Cleveland Cavaliers beat the San Antonio Spurs 117–109.

== Reception ==
Critical responses to the episode were mixed; Mike Flaherty and Mary Kaye Schilling of Entertainment Weekly graded the episode with a D, writing "What Seinfeld excels at is finding the eccentric in the apparently normal. A kooky New Age doctor? That's hitting the broad side of a barn." The Sydney Morning Herald critic Robin Oliver felt that, though he did not think the episode was bad, it was among Seinfeld's lesser episodes. However, Andy Patrizio of IGN considered "The Heart Attack" one of season two's best episodes. St. Louis Post-Dispatch critic Eric Mink also reacted very positively on the episode, praising the Shakespeare reference and Michael Richards' performance in particular.
