= John Posey (actor) =

American actor (born 1956)

- Born: John Sanford Posey; February 7, 1956 (age 70); Hartford, Connecticut, U.S.
- Occupation: Actor
- Years active: 1986–present
- Spouse(s): Cyndi Garcia (m. 1991; died 2014) Amy Lord (m. 2020)
- Children: 3; including Jesse, Tyler

John Sanford Posey (born February 7, 1956) is an American actor. With a long career in guest spots in episodes of various television series, he may be best known for his six appearances as Dr. Conrad Fenris in Teen Wolf (2011–2017), a show starring his son, Tyler Posey. He also had a recurring role as Judge Will Millstone in the first two seasons (2014–2015) of How to Get Away with Murder.

== Family Life ==
Posey was born in Hartford, Connecticut, to Joan (Armstrong) and William McCutcheon Posey Jr.

He is a father of three children, including actors Tyler and Jesse Posey.

== Career ==
When Bob Saget was initially unavailable for the pilot episode, John Posey was chosen to play Danny Tanner on the television series Full House and was cast in the unaired pilot; however, he was replaced by Saget for the series premiere when he was once again available.

== Filmography ==
=== Film ===
Year	Title	Role	Notes
1986	Manhunter	Mr. Jacobi	
1992	Out on a Limb	Analyst #1	
1993	RoboCop 3	David Halloran	
1999	California Myth	Joe	
2002	Thirst	Ed	
2010	Legendary	Coach Tennent	
2011	From the Head	Mr. Roberts	
2013	W.M.D.	The President	
2015	War Dog	Gary	Short
2016	Teleios	Atromitos Captain	
2017	Altitude	Pilot	
2018	Extracurricular Activities	Mr. Walker	
2018	Black Water	Captain Darrows	
2020	Alone	Dad	
2023	Teen Wolf: The Movie	Conrad Fenris	

=== Television ===
Year	Title	Role	Notes
1987	Full House	Danny Tanner	Episode: Unaired Pilot
1987	In Love and War	Pasquarelli	Television film
1988	Dallas	Alan Bodine	Episode: "The Fat Lady Singeth"
1990	Perry Mason: The Case of the Defiant Daughter	David Benson	Television film
1990	Cheers	Lars	Episode: "Ma Always Liked You Better"
1991	Seinfeld	Dr. Fein	Episode: "The Heart Attack"
1992	Hangin' with Mr. Cooper	Paramedic	Episode: "Hangin' with Michelle"
1993	Against the Grain	Stan Langston	Guest role; 2 episodes
1994	Sweet Justice	Tom Mason	Episode: "The Right Thing"
1995	The Marshal	Tucker Beedle	Episode: "The Bounty Hunter"
1995	My Wildest Dreams	John McGinnis	Recurring role; 5 episodes
1995	The Price of Love	Sgt. Albro	Television film role
1996	NewsRadio	Scott Barker	Episode: "The Song Remains the Same"
1996	The Client	Jim Addison	Episode: "Money Talks"
1997	JAG	Crash Investigator	Episode: "Jinx"
1997	The Pretender	Stan Conrad	Episode: "Ranger Jarod"
1997	Chicago Hope	Pilot	Episode: "Hope Against Hope"
1998	Seven Days	Marshall / Plant Manager	Episode: "Lifeboat"
1998	Nothing Sacred	Gregory	Episode: "Kindred Spirits"
1998	From the Earth to the Moon	John Young	Guest role; 3 episodes
1999	Love American Style	Dustin	Television film; Segment: Love And The Internet
2000	Family Law	Ken Bowmer	Episode: "The Choice"
2000	Hollywood Off-Ramp	R.J. Penny	Episode: "Picture This"
2001	Crossing Jordan	Dr. Cal Yarborough	Episode: "Believers"
2001	Providence	Mr. Stanley Green	Guest role; 2 episodes
2001–2003	Doc	Donny / Dr. Jakke	Guest role; 4 episodes
2006	ER	Mr. Ramsey	Episode: "If Not Now"
2006	24	Carl Mossman	Episode: Day 5: 11:00 p.m.-12:00 a.m.
2007	Just Jordan	Coach Kelly	Unknown episodes
2008	Swingtown	Sullivan	Episode: "Surprise!"
2008	Cold Case	Rick Rendell '08	Episode: "Roller Girl"
2008	Boston Legal	Chief Justice John Roberts	Guest role; 2 episodes
2010	Healing Hands	Henry Ferguson	Television film
2011	NCIS	Lance Simmons	Episode: "Recruited"
2011	Criminal Minds: Suspect Behavior	Principal Spurell	Episode: "Here Is the Fire"
2011–2017	Teen Wolf	Dr. Conrad Fenris	Guest role (Seasons 1, 4-6); 6 episodes
2013	Criminal Minds	Detective Tom Landry	Episode: "Alchemy"
2013	Drop Dead Diva	Franklin Rhodes	Episode: "Secret Lives"
2013	Bones	Sam Gilford	Episode: "The Mystery in the Meat"
2014	NCIS: Los Angeles	Army General Keys	Episode: "Black Budget"
2014–2015	How to Get Away with Murder	Judge Bill Millstone	Recurring role; 6 episodes
2015	Scorpion	LAFD Rescue Director	Episode: "Young Hearts Spark Fire"
2017	Stitchers	Fred Overmyer	Episode: "Dreamland"
2017	Lucifer	Judge	Guest role, episode: "What would Lucifer do"
2022	Better Call Saul	Rand Casimiro	2 episodes ("Axe and Grind", "Plan and Execution")
