= Alone (2020 horror film) =

2020 American horror film

- Official promotional poster
- Directed by: Johnny Martin
- Written by: Matt Naylor
- Produced by: Rabih Aridi; Anne Jordan; Johnny Martin
- Starring: Tyler Posey; Summer Spiro; Robert Ri'chard; Donald Sutherland; Maya Karin
- Cinematography: Martim Van
- Edited by: Phil Norden
- Music by: Frederik Wiedmann
- Production companies: Grindstone Entertainment Group; HIG Productions
- Distributed by: Lionsgate
- Release date: October 16, 2020
- Running time: 92 minutes
- Country: United States
- Language: English
- Budget: $750,000
- Box office: $642,502

Alone (released in the UK as Final Days) is a 2020 American horror film directed by Johnny Martin and starring Tyler Posey and Donald Sutherland. The film follows a young man who barricades himself inside his apartment during a zombie apocalypse. The film was released on October 16, 2020. It is an American remake of the movie #Alive, a 2020 South Korean horror film.

== Plot ==
One morning, a young man named Aidan awakens from a tryst with a random woman. A violent outbreak soon starts to happen outside of his apartment; everyone is being attacked by infected people called Screamers. His neighbor Brandon enters Aidan's apartment after being attacked by his roommate. Aidan threatens Brandon with a kitchen knife to leave after noticing a wound in the back of his neck. Later, Brandon begins to turn, but Aidan gets him out of his apartment before the change is complete.

On the news, Aidan learns that the virus is transferred by bite and scratching. The symptoms of being infected include bleeding eyes, rage, cannibalism, inhuman screaming, and repeating the last words said before turning. The Screamers are aware of what they are doing but cannot stop themselves. Their repeated use of their last words are an attempt to plead for someone to stop them. Aidan tries contacting his family, but the signal is not working on his phone. He can receive the text messages his father sends him, which inform Aidan that his sister got away, but is out of contact. Aidan's parents are trying to reach him but are having trouble with the outbreak. The last message from Aidan's father instructs Aidan to 'Stay Alive' and to not leave his home until they arrive.

Aidan follows his father's orders and isolates himself in the apartment. Over time he tallies the days that pass on his bathroom mirror, keeps video logs on his laptop, and tries to keep himself entertained. Eventually, he begins to run out of food, the water in his building is cut off, and he begins to hallucinate about his parents. A Screamer eventually breaks into his home using the air ducts connecting the rooms. He fights the Screamer off with a baseball bat and dumps the body off his balcony while sealing the vent the Screamer crashed through.

He later learns through a voicemail from his mother that his parents died while hiding from Screamers. Distraught, Aidan attempts suicide. The moment he readies to hang himself, however, he sees a woman on a balcony across from his; she is a normal human woman. Having found renewed hope, he gives up his suicide attempt. He contacts her the next morning using premade cue cards and learns that her name is Eva. The two strike up a friendship, with Aidan offering his reserved bottled water for her. He later gets Brandon's keys and grabs the remaining food and rock climbing gear to help Eva, even finding radios for them to communicate.

The two decide for Eva to escape to Aidan's room after a horde of Screamers enters her apartment. Aidan first travels through the air ducts to find more supplies for them to wait it out. Aidan eventually enters a room stocked with food. Eva warns him to leave as the room is barricaded with no one inside, signaling that it may be a trap. Aidan then finds Edward, an elderly survivor who entered the room before Aidan after the original tenant killed himself. Edward hits Aidan with his bat while the latter's guard is down.

Edward ties Aidan up in the bedroom to be a sacrifice for his wife, who has turned. Aidan is saved when Eva calls the radio, providing a distraction that allows him to escape and feed Edward to his wife. He grabs his belongings and runs to his room, drops from his balcony to the ground using a makeshift rope of bed sheets, fights off Screamers, and reaches Eva. They both fight to return to Aidan's apartment, with Eva entering the room first while Aidan fights off a Screamer. He returns covered in blood but believes that he has been infected when a mark on his shirt is revealed. He goes to jump to his death so that he will not turn and kill Eva, who pleads for him not to leave her. After removing his shirt they are both overjoyed to see that there is no bite and Aidan will not turn. They run to Aidan's door to hold the refrigerator back against it, stopping the Screamers from entering. They promise to survive together until the very last end.

== Cast ==
- Tyler Posey as Aidan
- Donald Sutherland as Edward
- Summer Spiro as Eva
- Robert Ri'chard as Brandon
- John Posey as Dad
- Eric Etebari as Jack Brian
- Maya Karin as Medical Analyst

== Release ==
The film was released via video-on-demand on October 16, 2020, and on DVD and Blu-ray on October 20, 2020.

== Reception ==
On the review aggregator website Rotten Tomatoes, 27% of 11 critics' reviews are positive. Chris Knight of the National Post wrote, "The rest of the film, including an oddly, unsatisfyingly sudden ending, fails to find traction." John Townsend of Starburst Magazine wrote, "It’s easy to imagine that upon conception Alone was an intelligent, thoughtful horror-thriller. [...] But there is no meat on these zombie bones, no depth to the plot or plight and little genuine threat from the afflicted populous. What remains instead is a disappointingly mediocre movie that will struggle to hold your attention for its duration and one you may well have forgotten all about soon after."

== See also ==
- #Alive, a 2020 Korean film based on the same script
