= Teen Wolf: The Movie =

2023 American supernatural thriller film

- Release poster
- Directed by: Russell Mulcahy
- Written by: Jeff Davis
- Based on: Teen Wolf (TV series) by Jeff Davis; Teen Wolf by Jeph Loeb and Matthew Weisman
- Produced by: Tyler Hoechlin; Tyler Posey; Mike Elliott; Blaine Williams
- Starring: Tyler Posey; Crystal Reed; Holland Roden; Shelley Hennig; JR Bourne; Ian Bohen; Colton Haynes; Linden Ashby; Melissa Ponzio; Ryan Kelley; Seth Gilliam; Orny Adams; Dylan Sprayberry; Khylin Rhambo; Tyler Hoechlin
- Cinematography: David Daniel
- Edited by: Edward R. Abroms; Gregory Cusumano
- Music by: Dino Meneghin
- Production companies: MTV Entertainment Studios; First Cause, Inc.; Capital Arts Entertainment; MGM Television
- Distributed by: Paramount+
- Release date: January 26, 2023
- Running time: 140 minutes
- Country: United States
- Language: English

Teen Wolf: The Movie is a 2023 American supernatural thriller film directed by Russell Mulcahy and written by Jeff Davis. The film is the fifth installment in the franchise, and is a continuation of the MTV series Teen Wolf. The film includes most of the cast reprising their roles, including Tyler Posey, Crystal Reed, Tyler Hoechlin, Holland Roden, Colton Haynes, Shelley Hennig, Dylan Sprayberry, Linden Ashby, Melissa Ponzio, and JR Bourne. It follows werewolf Scott McCall (Posey) as he protects his California town from an old threat. Teen Wolf: The Movie was released on Paramount+ on January 26, 2023, to mixed reviews from critics.

== Plot ==
Fifteen years after leaving Beacon Hills, Scott now runs an animal shelter in Los Angeles, adjoined to Deaton's new clinic, and is single. Lydia works at an energy company in San Francisco and has broken up with Stiles after receiving a recurring vision of his death. Derek has a 15-year-old son named Eli, and runs an auto repair shop with Malia and Peter. Mason has joined the Beacon Hills police force. Liam lives in Japan and works at a restaurant with Hikari Zhang, a kitsune, where they guard the urn containing the Nogitsune. A hooded figure attacks the restaurant and frees the Nogitsune.

The figure sets numerous fires in the Beacon Hills forest, while Scott, Lydia and Chris receive visions of Allison, who had died by the Oni's hand. (Note: As depicted in "Insatiable") They theorize her soul is trapped in bardo and cannot move on until they perform a ritual. They return to Beacon Hills along with Jackson for the ritual at the Nemeton, which unexpectedly resurrects Allison. She awakens with amnesia, not recognizing Scott and retaining only fragmented memories of her family's feud with Derek. She attacks Scott and flees the hospital.

Deaton realizes the Nogitsune has been possessing Chris and causing the visions of Allison in order to trick Scott's pack into bringing her back from the dead. The Nogitsune uses the Nemeton's power to physically manifest and creates nine Oni. It approaches Allison, claiming that Scott destroyed her family. Allison attacks Derek and hunts Scott and Eli until Scott lets her stab him with a wolfsbane-coated dagger. She takes him to the town's stadium to use him as bait for the rest of his pack. He manages to trigger more of her memories, and she forms a truce with him against the Nogitsune.

The Nogitsune abducts Liam, Hikari, Derek, Eli, Noah, Mason and Deaton, and holds them hostage in an illusionary bardo. Lydia and Jackson examine the forest fires and realize that rowan trees were burned in order to produce mountain ash. The culprit is Adrian Harris, who has been in hiding since his apparent murder, (Note: Harris was apparently sacrificed by Jennifer Blake in "Unleashed"; the means by which he survived are not explained.) blaming Scott's pack for his misfortunes and plotting revenge. Harris surrounds the stadium with mountain ash and forces Lydia to watch her friends' plight so the Nogitsune can feed on her pain. Lydia produces a banshee scream that causes Allison to fully remember her past upon hearing it. Scott persuades the Nogitsune to let everyone go if Allison executes him. She reluctantly shoots him, but Hikari's kitsune spirit shields him from harm. Parrish burns through the mountain ash, and he, Chris, Melissa, and the others join the pack in bardo. The reunited pack kill the Oni while Scott, Derek and Eli overpower the Nogitsune. Derek restrains it until Parrish incinerates them both. Derek's eyes turn red in his final moments, becoming a true Alpha through his act of self-sacrifice. Allison reunites with Scott and her friends.

At Derek's funeral, Noah bequeaths ownership of Stiles' Jeep to Eli. Scott resumes his relationship with Allison and plans to eventually adopt Eli. Parrish has Harris committed to Eichen House.

== Cast ==
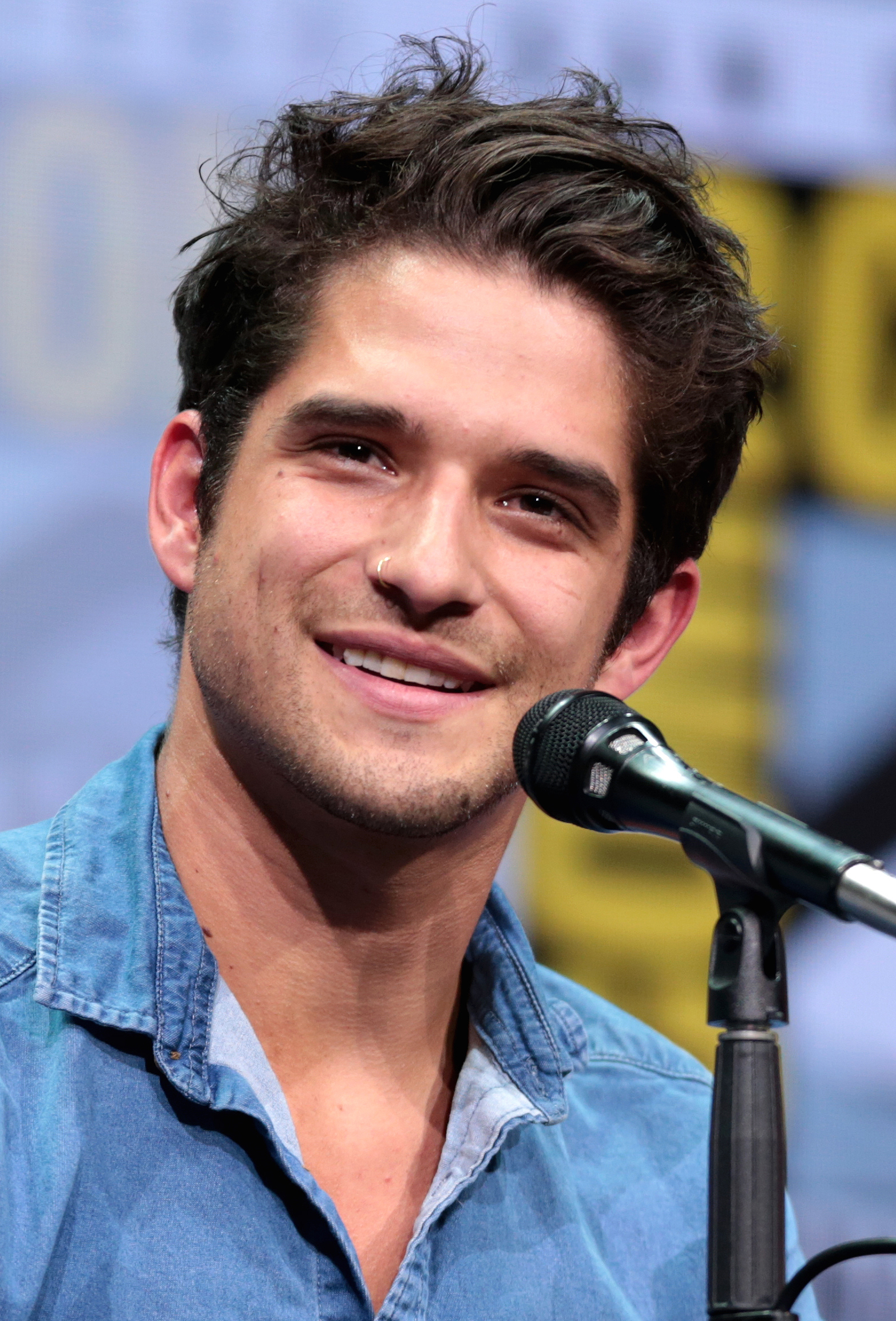
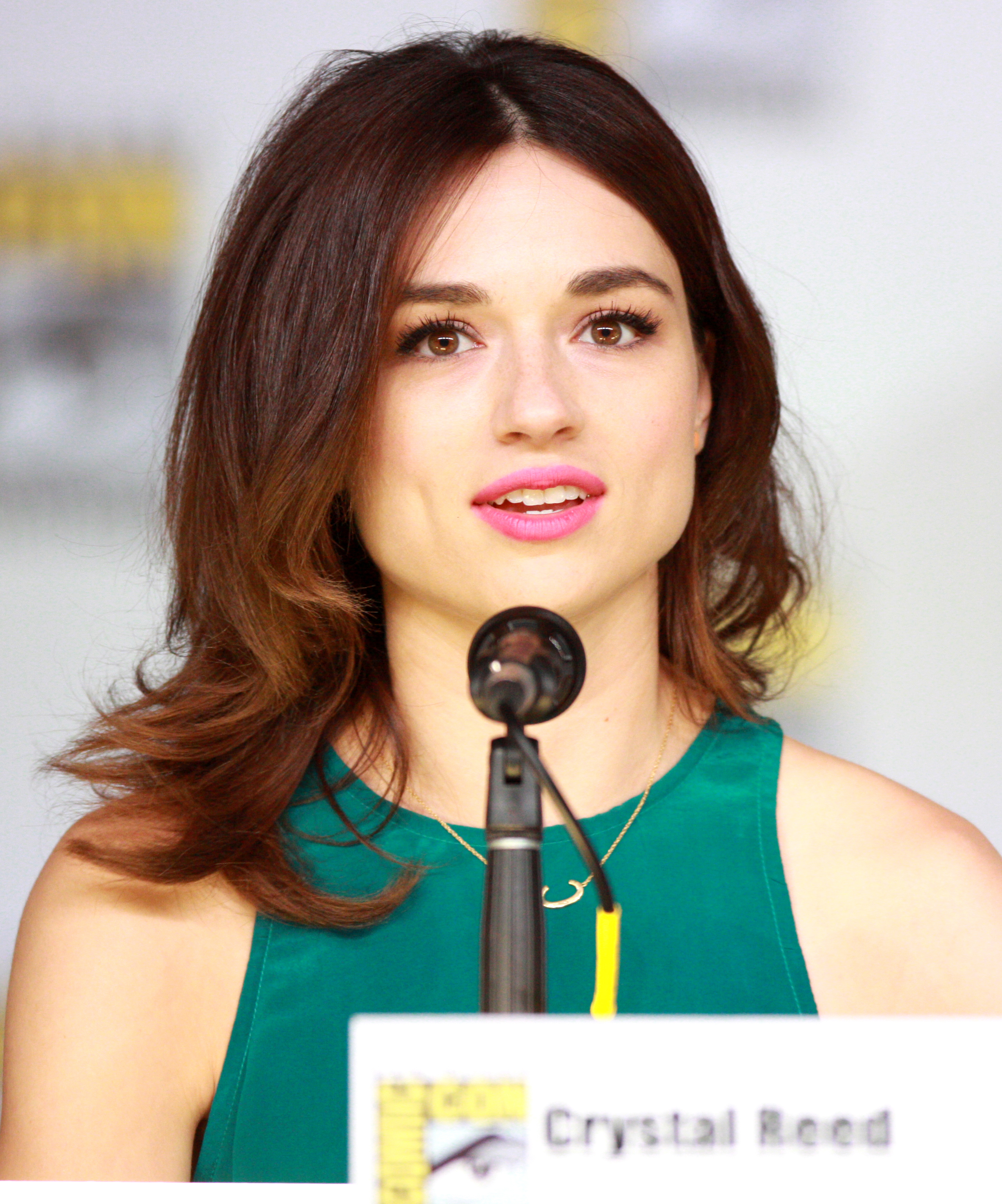
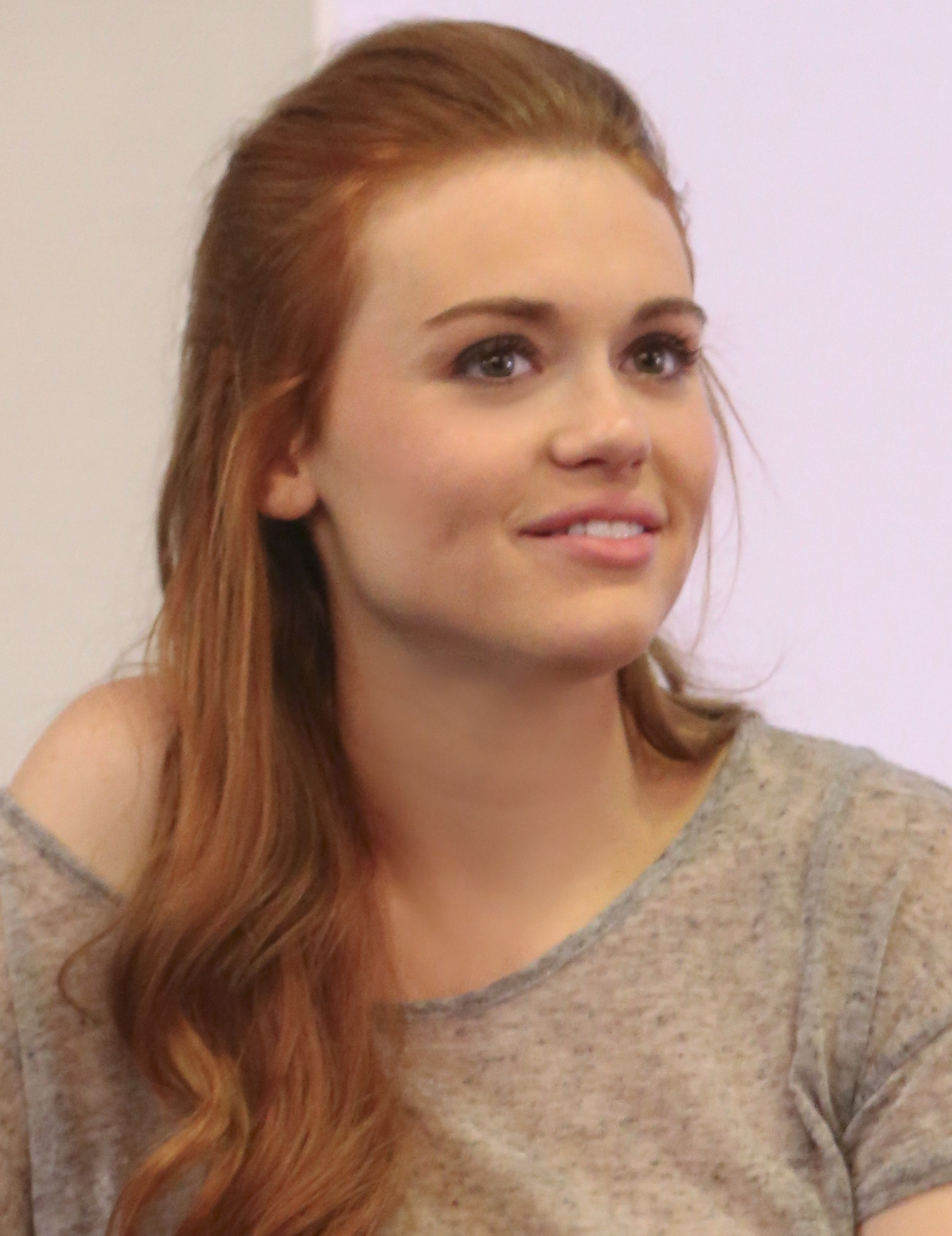
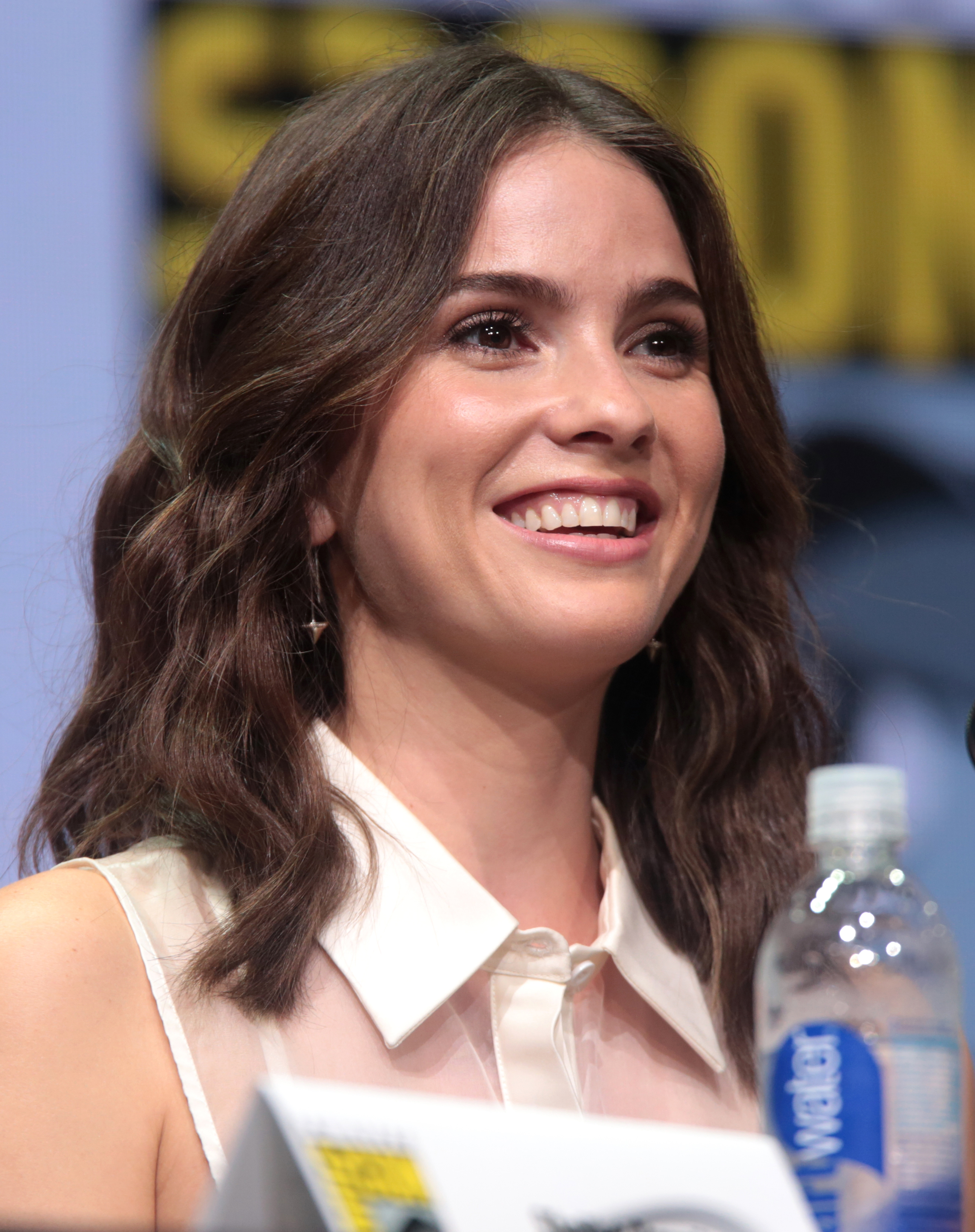
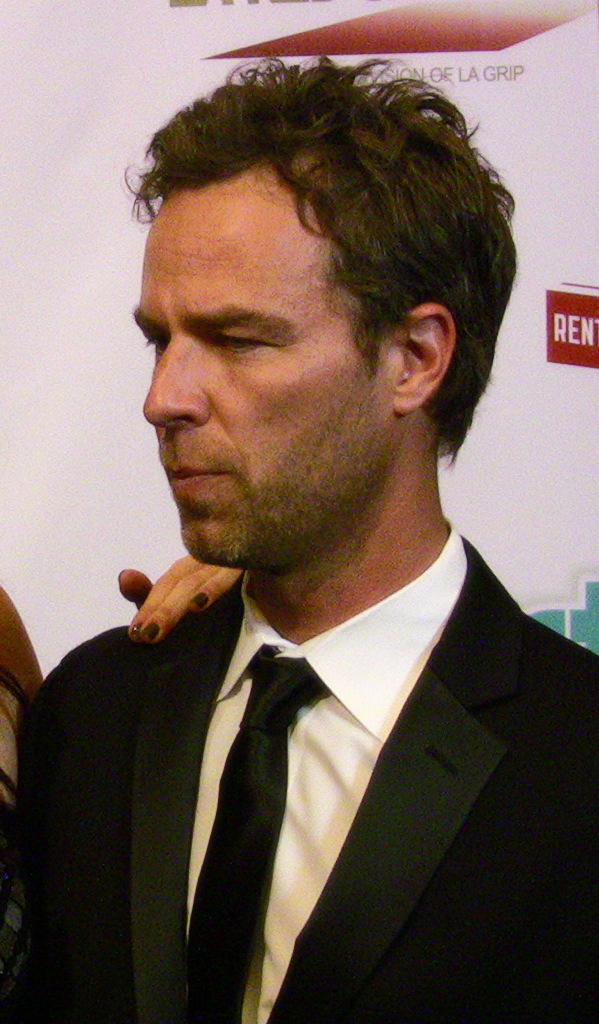
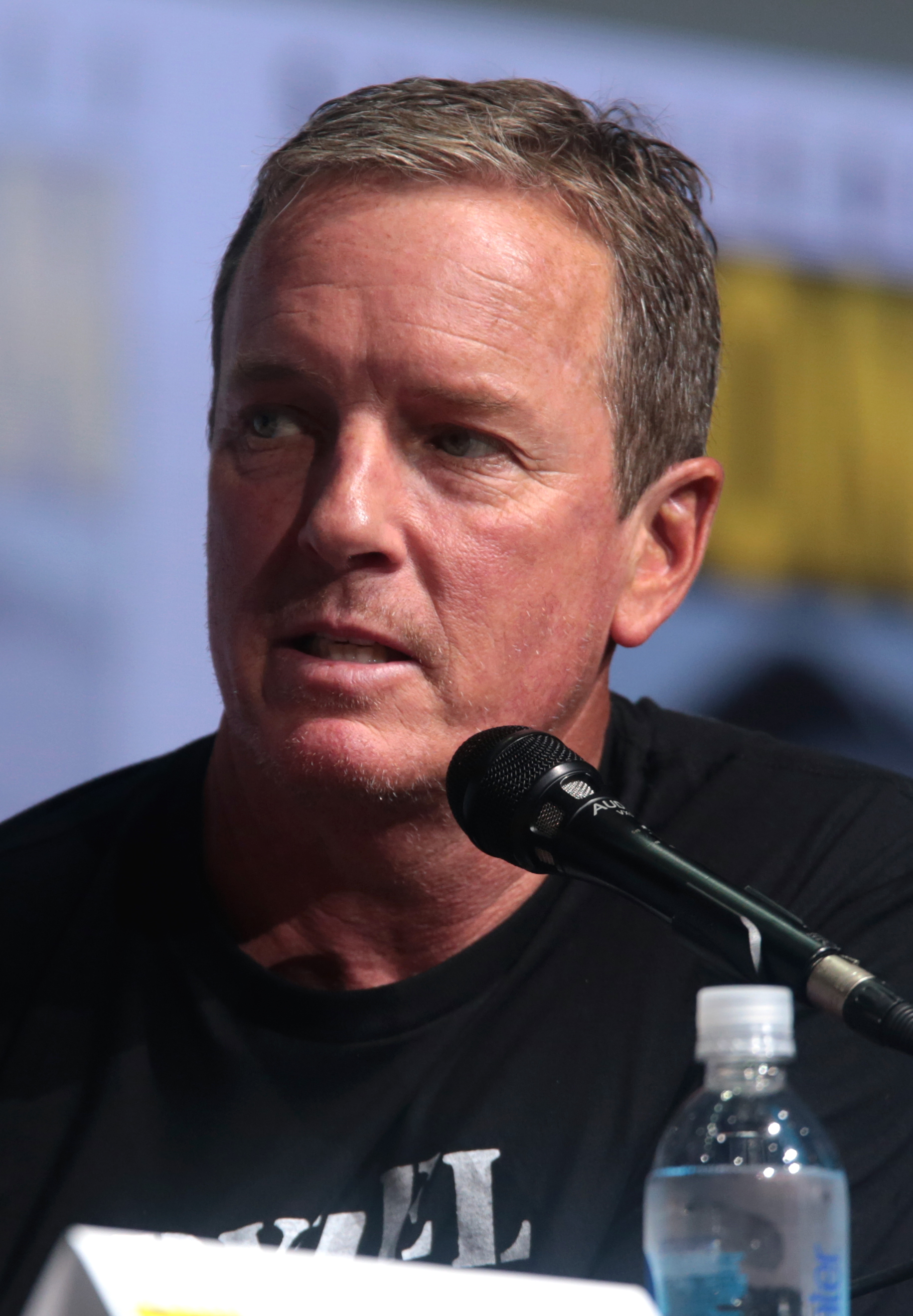
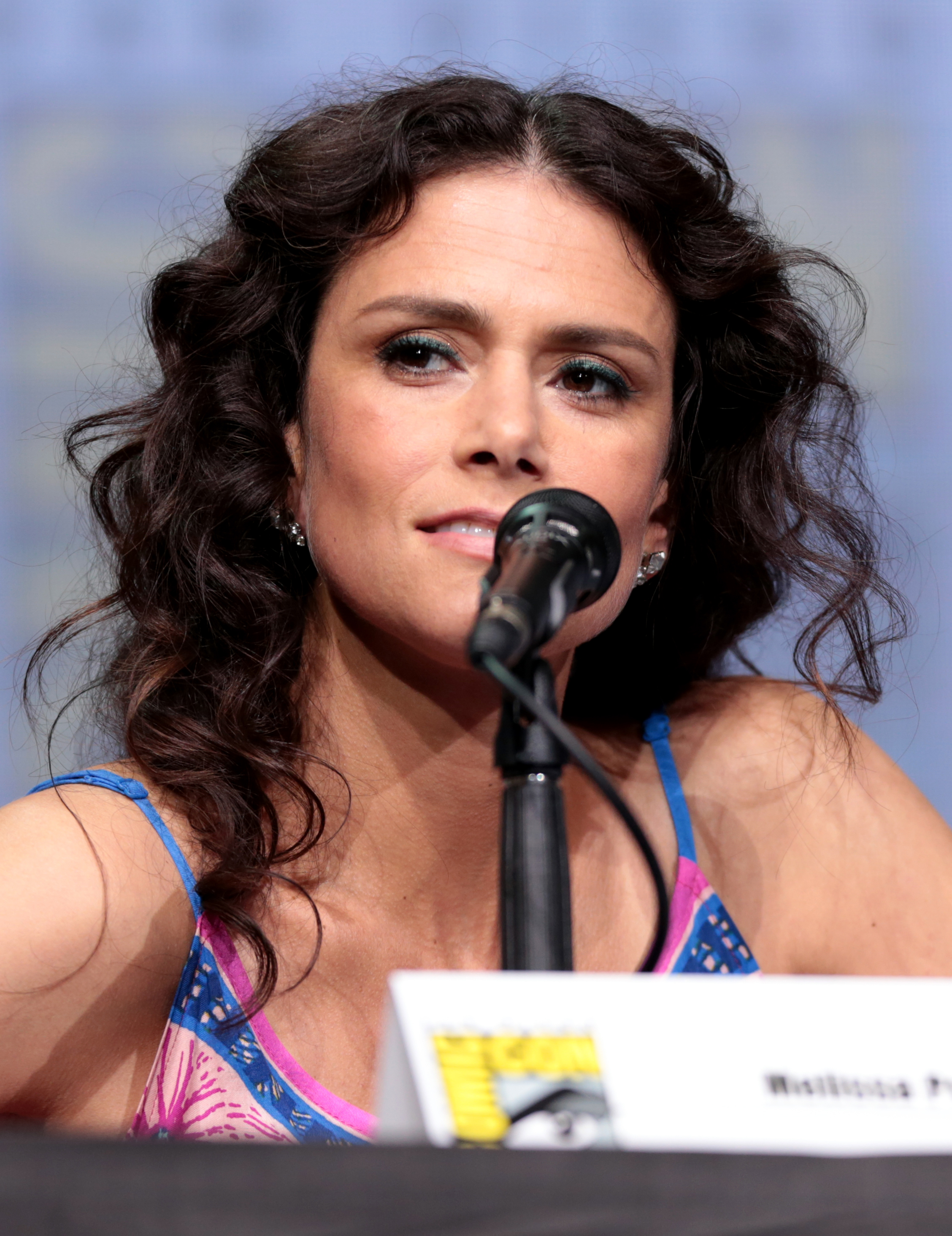
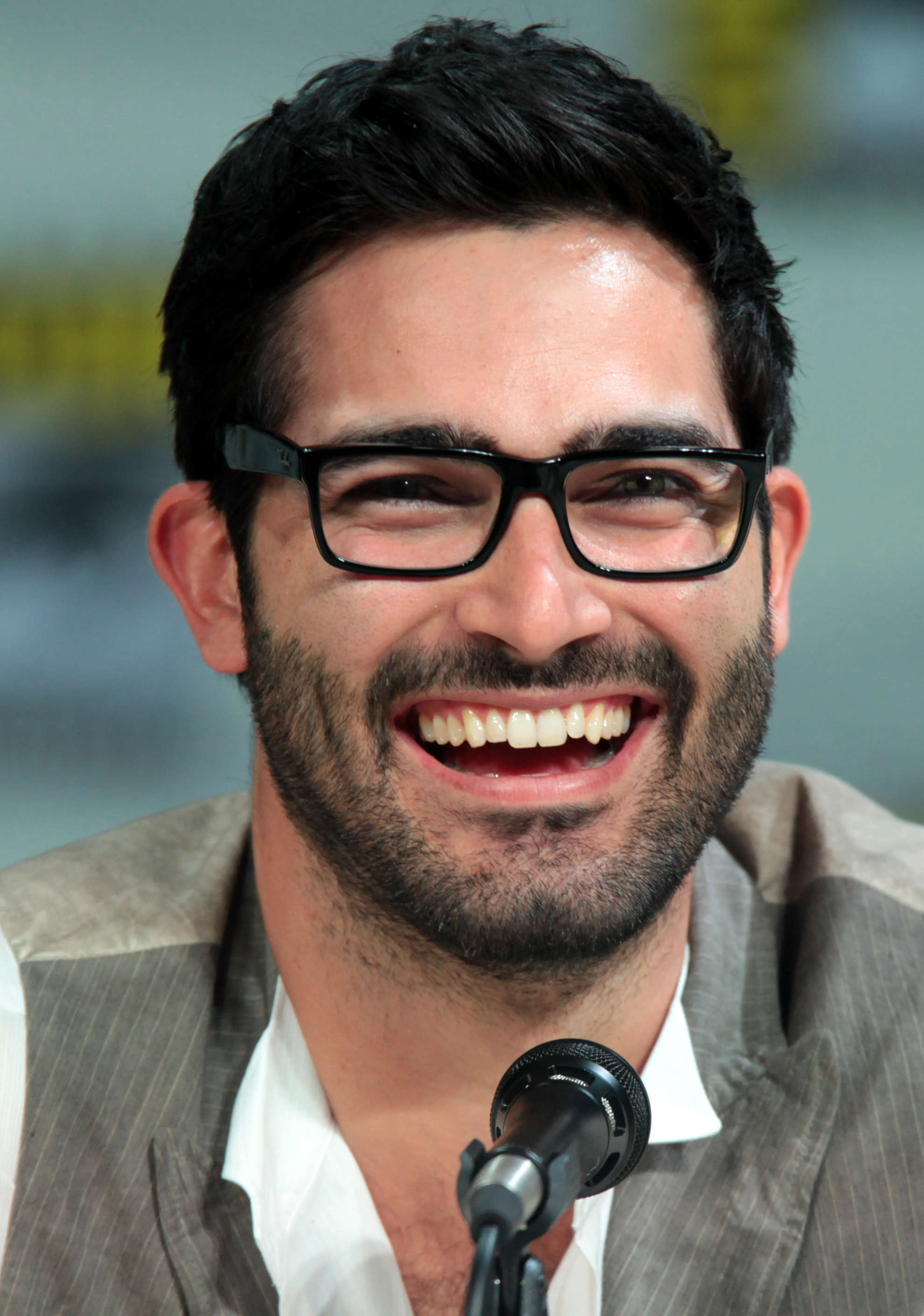
The principal cast of Teen Wolf: The Movie includes (top row, left to right) Tyler Posey, Crystal Reed, Holland Roden, Shelley Hennig, (bottom row, left to right) JR Bourne, Linden Ashby, Melissa Ponzio, and Tyler Hoechlin.
- Tyler Posey as Scott McCall
- Crystal Reed as Allison Argent
- Holland Roden as Lydia Martin
- Shelley Hennig as Malia Tate
- JR Bourne as Chris Argent
- Ian Bohen as Peter Hale
- Colton Haynes as Jackson Whittemore
- Linden Ashby as Noah Stilinski
- Melissa Ponzio as Melissa McCall
- Ryan Kelley as Jordan Parrish
- Seth Gilliam as Alan Deaton
- Orny Adams as Bobby Finstock
- Dylan Sprayberry as Liam Dunbar
- Khylin Rhambo as Mason Hewitt
- Aaron Hendry as The Nogitsune
- Vince Mattis as Eli Hale
- Amy Workman as Hikari Zhang (Note: Despite not being listed as a main character on the film's official poster, Workman is credited in the opening credits before Tyler Hoechlin.)
- Tyler Hoechlin as Derek Hale
- Adam Fristoe as Adrian Harris
- Eaddy Mays as Victoria Argent
- Manuel Rafael Lozano as Lieutenant Ibarra
- Jesse Posey as Raymond Delgado
- Nobi Nakanishi as Deputy Ishida
- L.B. Fisher as Coach Hogan
- John Posey as Conrad Fenris (uncredited)

== Production ==
In September 2021, it was announced that a reunion film for 2011 Teen Wolf television series had been ordered by Paramount+, with Jeff Davis returning as a screenwriter and executive producer for the film. The majority of the original cast members reprised their roles, although cast members Dylan O'Brien, Arden Cho and Cody Christian declined to return. Teen Wolf episode director Russell Mulcahy returned to direct the film.

Principal photography began on March 21, 2022, and finished on May 17.

== Release ==
The film was released on Paramount+ on January 26, 2023.

== Reception ==
On the review aggregator website Rotten Tomatoes, 32% of 25 critics' reviews are positive, with an average rating of 5.1/10. The website's consensus reads: "The cast is back but nostalgia can't save Teen Wolf: The Movie, a lackluster revival that retracts its claws and tucks its tail between its legs." Metacritic gave the film a weighted average score of 51 out of 100, based on 7 critics. including "mixed or average reviews".

Teen Wolf: The Movie broke Paramount+ records as the most watched original film on the day of its debut.

At the 2023 MTV Movie & TV Awards, Teen Wolf: The Movie was nominated for Best Kick-Ass Cast.

== Potential sequel ==
Following the release of Teen Wolf: The Movie, which was initially part of a three-film deal, actor Tyler Posey, who portrays Scott McCall, expressed a strong desire to continue the franchise. In interviews, Posey revealed that he had written a script for a potential sequel. He also mentioned having ideas for a third installment or possibly transitioning the story into a television series. Posey emphasized his commitment to leading the project, stating, "I want to spearhead it. I want it really bad." In September 2025, Posey confirmed that some original cast members are on board for the sequel, though specific details were not disclosed.
