= Life's Work =

American television series

- Title screen with programming information
- Genre: Sitcom
- Created by: Warren Bell; Lisa Ann Walter
- Starring: Lisa Ann Walter; Michael O'Keefe; Lainie Kazan; Jenny O'Hara; Alexa Vega
- Opening theme: "Life's Work" (instrumental)
- Composers: Mark Mothersbaugh; Bob Mothersbaugh
- Country of origin: United States
- Original language: English
- No. of seasons: 1
- No. of episodes: 18

Production
- Camera setup: Multi-camera
- Running time: 30 minutes
- Production companies: Weest, Inc.; Touchstone Television

Original release
- Network: ABC
- Release: September 17, 1996 – June 10, 1997

Life's Work is an American sitcom series that aired from September 1996 to June 1997 on ABC; the show stars Lisa Ann Walter as Lisa Ann Minardi Hunter, an assistant district attorney in Baltimore.

== Premise ==
Lisa Ann always wanted to practice law since she was young because she always argued with her parents. She also had a basketball coach husband named Kevin Hunter (Michael O'Keefe) who served as the patriarch of the family. Together, they raised a seven-year-old daughter Tess (Alexa Vega) and a toddler son named Griffin (Cameron and Luca Weibel). During the entire run of the series, an electric guitar & piano instrumental was used as the show's opening theme. Walter helped Mark Mothersbaugh write the theme.

Walter was an actress turned stand-up comic whose "voice" of a busy working mom became a top headlining act in the 1990s. ABC developed Life's Work for Walter, where she played a feisty feminist who could stand up to her mother in addition to her superiors at work. Walter received almost unanimous positive reviews for her portrayal of a harried working mother in a bold departure from the usual working mom shows where you never see the mom actually working.

As of July 2022, 15 (of the 18) episodes are available to purchase on several streaming services including AppleTV, Amazon, and YouTube.

In one of the episodes, Lisa Ann claimed to have a sexual affair with then-current American President Bill Clinton.

== Cast ==
=== Main ===
- Lisa Ann Walter as Lisa Ann Minardi Hunter
- Michael O'Keefe as Kevin Hunter
- Alexa Vega as Tess Hunter
- Cameron and Luca Weibel as Griffin Hunter
- Larry Miller as Mr. Jerome Nash
- Lightfield Lewis as Matt Youngster
- Molly Hagan as Dee Dee Lucas

=== Recurring ===
- Jenny O'Hara and Lainie Kazan as Constance "Connie" Minardi
- Tara Karsian as Emily

== Episodes ==
No.	Title	Directed by	Written by	Original release date	Prod. code
1	"Pilot"	Michael Lessac	Story by : Lisa Ann Walter & Warren Bell; Teleplay by : Warren Bell	September 17, 1996	L402
2	"Daycareless"	Michael Lessac	Nora Lynch & Paul Palisoul	September 24, 1996	L404
3	"Contempt"	Michael Lessac	Warren Bell	October 1, 1996	L406
4	"Concert"	Michael Lessac	Vicki S. Horowitz	October 8, 1996	L407
5	"Burnout"	Michael Lessac	Elin Hampton & David Fury	October 15, 1996	L405
6	"Playdates"	Michael Lessac	Tim Maile and Douglas Tuber	October 22, 1996	L403
7	"Girlfriends"	Unknown	Alana Burgi & Marsha Myers	October 29, 1996	L408
8	"Pregnancy"	Michael Lessac	Mitchell Newman	November 12, 1996	L409
9	"Jobs"	Unknown	Elin Hampton & David Fury	November 19, 1996	L410
10	"Gobbledegook"	Michael Lessac	Nora Lynch & Paul Palisoul	November 26, 1996	L411
11	"Boss"	Michael Lessac	Bernie DeLeo	December 3, 1996	L412
12	"Fired"	Michael Lessac	Douglas Tuber & Tim Maile	December 17, 1996	L413
13	"Harassment"	Howard Murray	Matt Ember & Warren Bell	January 7, 1997	L414
14	"Fraud"	Howard Murray	Marsha Myers & Alana Burgi	January 14, 1997	L415
15	"Neighbors"	Michael Lessac	Douglas Tuber & Tim Maile	January 28, 1997	L417
16	"Ride Along"	Michael Lessac	Story by : Lois Bromfield; Teleplay by : Phil Palisoul & Nora Lynch	May 27, 1997	L418
17	"Dates"	Michael Lessac	Nora Lynch & Phil Palisoul	June 3, 1997	L416
18	"Banquet"	Michael Lessac	Story by : Douglas Tuber & Tim Maile; Teleplay by : Alana Burgi & Marsha Myers	June 10, 1997	L419

== Cancellation ==
The show was put on hiatus after the episode "Neighbors" aired on January 27, 1997. Months later, having finished the season in 38th place with a 9.5 rating, the show was officially cancelled even though it held on to more than 90% of the viewers who watched the final season of Roseanne.

== Bibliography ==
- Damerini, Leopoldo; Fabrizio Margaria (2001). Garzanti (ed.). Dizionario dei telefilm (1ª ed.). Garzanti. ISBN 88-11-74000-2.
