= My Wildest Dreams (TV series) =

- Created by: Shawn Schepps
- Starring: Lisa Ann Walter; John Posey
- Composer: Jonathan Wolff
- Country of origin: United States
- Original language: English
- No. of seasons: 1
- No. of episodes: 5

Production
- Executive producer: Micki Raton
- Running time: 30 minutes
- Production companies: ELP Communications; Columbia Pictures Television

Original release
- Network: Fox
- Release: May 28 – June 25, 1995

My Wildest Dreams is an American sitcom that aired on Fox on Sunday nights at 9:30 pm from May 28 to June 25, 1995.

== Plot ==
The series centered on Lisa McGinnis, a mother of two, who worked at a recording studio and had fantasies of being a rock star. She lived with her husband Jack, who ran a sporting goods store, and her children, Danny and Delilah, in suburban New Jersey.

== Cast ==
- Lisa Ann Walter as Lisa McGinnis
- John Posey as Jack McGinnis
- J. Evan Bonifant as Danny McGinnis
- Mary Jo Keenen as Stephanie James
- Kelly Bishop as Gloria James
- Miguel A. Nunez Jr as Chandler Trapp

== Episodes ==
No.	Title	Directed by	Written by	Original release date
1	"You Don't Know Me"	Jeff Melman	Mike Teverbaugh & Linda Teverbaugh	May 28, 1995
2	"The Poker Game"	Alan Myerson	Jordan Moffet	June 4, 1995
3	"Sister's Mister"	Alan Myerson	Micki Raton	June 11, 1995
4	"Take This Job and Love It"	Jeff Melman	Micki Raton	June 18, 1995
5	"Wedding Bell Blues"	John Tracy	Micki Raton	June 25, 1995
