= List of Teen Wolf (2011 TV series) secondary characters =

Teen Wolf is an American television series that airs on MTV. The series premiered on Sunday, June 5, 2011, following the 2011 MTV Movie Awards. Teen Wolf is a supernatural drama series that follows Scott McCall (Tyler Posey), a high school student and social outcast who is bitten by a werewolf. He tries to maintain a normal life while hiding his secret and dealing with supernatural dangers that plague the town of Beacon Hills. He is aided by his best friend, Stiles Stilinski (Dylan O'Brien), and mysterious werewolf, Derek Hale (Tyler Hoechlin).

== Cast ==
Actor	Character	Seasons					
Actor	Character	1	2	3	4	5	6
Recurring
Orny Adams	Bobby Finstock	Recurring	Recurring	Recurring	Recurring	Guest	Recurring
Seth Gilliam	Alan Deaton	Recurring	Recurring	Recurring	Recurring	Recurring	Guest
Eaddy Mays	Victoria Argent	Recurring	Recurring	Guest			
Keahu Kahuanui	Danny Mahealani	Recurring	Recurring	Recurring			
Susan Walters	Natalie Martin	Guest	Guest	Recurring	Recurring	Recurring	Recurring
Adam Fristoe	Adrian Harris	Recurring	Recurring	Guest			
Jill Wagner	Kate Argent	Recurring		Guest	Recurring		Recurring
Ian Bohen	Peter Hale	Recurring	Recurring	Recurring	Recurring		Recurring
Daniel Sharman	Isaac Lahey		Recurring	Recurring			
Stephen Lunsford	Matt Daehler		Recurring				
Michael Hogan	Gerard Argent		Recurring	Recurring		Recurring	Recurring
Bianca Lawson	Marin Morrell		Recurring	Recurring			
Sinqua Walls	Vernon Boyd		Recurring	Recurring			
Gage Golightly	Erica Reyes		Recurring	Recurring			
Charlie Carver	Ethan Steiner			Recurring			Recurring
Max Carver	Aiden Steiner			Recurring		Guest	
Haley Webb	Jennifer Blake			Recurring			Guest
Adelaide Kane	Cora Hale			Recurring			
Meagan Tandy	Braeden			Recurring	Recurring	Recurring	
Gideon Emery	Deucalion			Recurring		Recurring	Recurring
Felisha Terrell	Kali			Recurring			
Brian Patrick Wade	Ennis			Recurring			
Matthew Del Negro	Rafael McCall			Recurring	Recurring		Recurring
Tamlyn Tomita	Noshiko Yukimura			Recurring	Recurring	Recurring	Guest
Tom T. Choi	Ken Yukimura			Recurring	Recurring	Recurring	
Ryan Kelley	Jordan Parrish			Recurring	Recurring	Recurring	Recurring
Maya Eshet	Meredith Walker			Recurring	Recurring	Recurring	
Aaron Hendry	Brunski			Recurring	Recurring		
Lily Mariye	Satomi Ito			Recurring	Recurring		
Ivonne Coll	Araya Calavera			Recurring	Recurring		
Khylin Rhambo	Mason Hewitt				Recurring	Recurring	Recurring
Cody Saintgnue	Brett Talbot				Recurring	Recurring	Recurring
Mason Dye	Garrett				Recurring		
Samantha Logan	Violet				Recurring		
Steven Brand	Gabriel Valack				Recurring	Recurring	
Cody Christian	Theo Raeken					Recurring	Recurring
Victoria Moroles	Hayden Romero					Recurring	Recurring
Michael Johnston	Corey Bryant					Recurring	Recurring
Ashton Moio	Donovan Donati					Recurring	
Kelsey Chow	Tracy Stewart					Recurring	
Henry Zaga	Josh Diaz					Recurring	
Marisol Nichols	Corinne					Recurring	
Gilles Marini	Sebastien Valet					Recurring	
Andrew Matarazzo	Gabe						Recurring
Alisha Boe	Gwen						Recurring
Ross Butler	Nathan Pierce						Recurring
Sibongile Mlambo	Tamora Monroe						Recurring
Froy Gutierrez	Nolan Holloway						Recurring
Matt Shively	Oliver			Guest			

== Secondary characters ==
Character	Portrayer	Season appearances	Species
Peter Hale	Ian Bohen (adult); Michael Fjordbak (teen)	1, 2, 3, 4, 6	Werewolf
Peter Hale is Derek's uncle, a hereditary werewolf. In the Hale Fire, Peter was badly burned, rendered comatose for six years. In the episode "Wolf's Bane", Peter is revealed to be the Alpha werewolf who killed Derek's sister Laura his niece to become an Alpha, Bitten Scott McCall and committed the murders throughout Season 1. Peter is a sociopath, manipulative, charming and witty, smart with his actions, and ultimately power-hungry. The people he killed were arsonists and conspirators involved in the Hale Fire. Later on in "Formality", Peter attacks and Bites Lydia and in "Code Breaker", the Season 1 finale, Peter kills Kate Argent, the final culprit in the conspiracy. Peter is defeated by being burned alive by Scott, Allison, Stiles, and Jackson. Derek then slashes his throat, killing Peter to become an Alpha. In Season 2, Peter appears as a young man in Lydia's hallucinations, successfully seducing Lydia before revealing his true identity, to her horror. He lives on in Lydia's mind. Peter knew Lydia would be immune to the Bite, so instead Peter had imprinted his memories within Lydia as his back-up plan, should he be killed. He psychologically tortures her into following his instructions. In "Party Guessed" by using Derek's healing ability as an Alpha and the light of the Worm moon, Peter successfully has Lydia resurrect him. It is revealed by Deaton, that Peter lost his Alpha status upon resurrection and his abilities are subsequently impaired. Throughout Season 3, Peter has an uneasy alliance with Derek and the gang after helping them against the Kanima. It is depicted in the past that even before the fire, Peter was a conniving manipulator; he started a chain of events that lead to the death of Derek's first love, Paige. Peter felt envy and resentment over his older sister Talia's leadership of their family, firmly believing the role of Alpha was his. Sneaky as always, Peter has shown to somewhat care about his remaining family, Derek and his other niece Cora, most likely out of convenience and survival. When Cora is dying of mistletoe poisoning in "Alpha Pact", Peter tells Derek of a technique to cure sickness with pain transference as a way to save her, but he'll give up his Alpha status. When Derek decides to go through with it, Peter grins in triumph. In the mid-Season finale, after Scott becomes a True Alpha, Peter prevents Jennifer from attempting to re-energize herself using the Nemeton again. The Darach reveals she knows he plans to kill Scott. Peter kills Jennifer, boasting that he is "always been the Alpha". In Season 3B, Peter goes along with Derek on the latter's mission to recover his sister Talia's claws from the Calaveras. Derek has Peter use Talia's claws to conduct a ritual so Derek could communicate with Talia's ghost, in exchange he tells his nephew he wants to keep the claws. In "Letharia Vulpina", Peter tells Lydia he will help her control her banshee powers on the condition that she do something for him: he wants her to listen to Talia's claws and translate a memory Talia stole from him before the fire. Lydia manages, and she discovers that Peter had fathered a child, the werecoyote Malia Tate, but refrains from telling him her name. In "De-Void", after the Pack paralyze Void Stiles' body, Lydia calls Peter for help. He complies, but Lydia has to give him his child's name. Peter shows Scott how to utilize an Alpha's power to meld minds so that he and Lydia can enter Stiles' mind to find Stiles and guide him back. Lydia gives Peter Malia's name. In episode "117" of Season 4, Peter comes face-to-face with Malia, though Malia is initially kept in the dark about her relation to him. Peter has also regained his full strength and werewolf abilities. He learns of Kate Argent's survival and faces off against her when she infiltrates the Hale vault, but the Benefactor simultaneously robs the Hales' fortune, $117 million in bearer bonds, to his anger. In "Orphaned", Peter approaches Kate with a proposition: he offers her control over her werejaguar shapeshift. In return, she helps him recover his money and implement his plan to kill Scott. In "Time of Death", Peter meets with Malia after she finds out he is her biological father, showing her the file confirming her adoption. He offers her his help in finding her biological mother who is known as 'the Desert Wolf'. After it is revealed Meredith Walker is the Benefactor in "Monstruous", Peter, reading Meredith's mind, sees that through Meredith telepathically hearing his vengeful thoughts, he'd concocted the Dead Pool plan. He is amused by the whole ordeal, saying the 'plan' was the ravings of a lunatic, that comatose for a werewolf is beyond torture. At the end of Season 4, Peter and Kate initiate the plan to kill Scott. Kate abducts Scott and transforms him into a Berserker. Peter goes along with the Pack when they rally to go up against Kate, ostensibly promising Malia she'll meet her mother if she kills Kate, and imploring the Pack not to hold back against the Berserkers. The plan fails at the last minute when Scott is able to break free of being a Berserker. Scott confronts Peter that he figured the plan out to kill him for power. Showing his true colors, Peter viciously retorts that he pursues power for his family, that the one to inherit it is him, telling his werewolf progeny he does not deserve his power. Peter clashes against Scott. Peter gets the upper hand but Scott triggers new strength and swiftly defeats Peter, telling him he "was never an Alpha, he was always a monster". Peter is drugged with yellow monkshood, brought back to Beacon Hills, and incarcerated in the prison of Eichen House for supernaturals. Peter vehemently swears he will find a way out. After getting a frightening vision from Valack's "third eye", he was relocated to another cell. In season 6A "Radio Silence", Peter is revealed to be taken by the Wild Hunt and dropped off at an abandoned train station. He finds Stiles who was also taken and does not look too pleased to see him. Stiles questions him on how he escaped from Eichen House, Peter explains that during the power outage that happened around the time Scott and his Pack were rescuing Lydia from Eichen House, Peter escaped, only to be taken by the Ghost Riders. When Peter learns that he has been at the train station for 3 months, he couldn't believe no one noticed he was missing. Both Peter and Stiles reluctantly work together to find a way out, which is through a tunnel but with a barrier at the end. One person tries to escape, but gets incinerated. Peter makes it out, but gets burned in the process. After making it to the woods, he Roars which is heard by Scott and Malia. They find him and instantly remember him, then they realise that he was taken by the Ghost Riders. They siphon some of his pain, hoping to make it easier for him. He is later taken to the hospital where Melissa begins treating his burns. After he recovers, Peter wants Malia to leave town with him. She refuses to do so without Stiles to which he says her loyalty is overrated. He tells her to run as he'll hold off the approaching Ghost Riders. In "Blitzkrieg" as Scott and Malia are underground trying to escape the Ghost Riders, Peter arrives just in time to stop the Ghost Riders from killing Malia and Scott. He sacrifices himself and allows the Ghost Riders to erase him again, giving Scott and Malia a chance to escape. In "Riders on the Storm", Peter is found by Lydia and Malia in the train station, only for them to discover that he is in a trancelike state. He is snapped out of it by Malia and he helps her, Theo and Scott fend off the Ghost Riders. After Garrett Douglas tries to call back the departing Ghost Riders, Peter points out that the Ghost Riders have no leader. He, Scott, Malia and Theo watch on as Garrett is turned into a Ghost Rider and leaves with the other Ghost Riders.
Victoria Argent	Eaddy Mays	1, 2, 3	Human
Victoria Argent is Allison's mother, Chris Argent's wife. As a result of the matriarchal rules of the Argent family, Victoria is the official leader of the Argents' hunters who makes the final decisions, with leadership on the field being deferred to Argent himself. Victoria is a rather zealous, vindictive and hard-hearted woman, giving werewolves no mercy, even with humans. While she shares Argent's restraint, she does not share his morals. Her cold demeanor not withstanding, Victoria loves Argent and Allison, nonetheless. Victoria is an attentive wife and mother and, like Argent, overprotective of Allison. She is overbearing also and prone to fits of rage. In "Lunatic", when Derek Hale is on the run after being framed for the attempted murder of Allison and the kids at the high school, Victoria coldly states that the hunters are to "find (Derek), kill him, cut him in half". In the Season 1 finale she demands Allison keep quiet over her introduction to the supernatural. Victoria is not above torture to get what she wants, as in "Shape-Shifted" she electrocutes the principal of Beacon Hills High to have him resign so Gerard could take his place as part of a plan to keep an eye on Beacon Hills' werewolves. When Victoria suspects Scott and Allison are still seeing each other after she and Argent had forbidden them to, she mutilates her arm in "Ice Pick", so to ask Scott's mother Melissa questions on Scott. In "Frenemy", she takes a job as a substitute teacher to completely keep an eye on her daughter. In "Raving", Victoria inconspicuously sees Scott and Allison kissing. To keep Scott away from Allison for good, she ambushes him at the rave party during the sting operation to capture the Kanima. She attempts to murder him by triggering his asthma with wolfsbane. Scott lets out a howl for help, but Victoria gloats believing he is on his own. Derek however, fights her off and saves Scott, Biting her in the process. In "Party Guessed", Bitten, changing into a werewolf, Victoria must now commit suicide to obey the hunter's code, which Gerard endorses. She writes a goodbye letter to Allison, feeling genuine sorrow that she did not get a chance to talk to her daughter one last time as Allison had taken off to Lydia's party. Upon the full moon rising, she feels the transformation happening. Overwhelmed, she confesses she can't pull off her suicide by herself and asks Argent to help her. Together, they impale her upon a knife. Victoria dies in Argent's arms. Victoria's death causes Allison's devastation and moral spiral at the end of Season 2, but also Argent's defection from the hunter's cause. Victoria's attempt to murder Scott is unknown to Allison until Season 3, as Scott did not want her actions to be Allison's last memory of her mother. During Season 3A, Victoria appears in flashbacks, and mental visions to Allison.
Bobby Finstock	Orny Adams	1, 2, 3, 4, 5, 6	Human
Coach Bobby Finstock is the eccentric and sarcastic coach of the Beacon Hills High School lacrosse and cross-country teams, as well as the economics teacher. Finstock pressures the players to do their best, targeting Scott and Stiles often. Though he pushes the team to their limit, he encourages teamwork and is shown to support them wholeheartedly through games. He often expresses hostility toward an unseen character named "Greenberg" and makes cracks about his one testicle. He is an alcoholic, drinking "every night", but has been sober for 15 years. He uses quotes from his favorite movie, Independence Day, as a way to motivate his players. Every year, on October 30 (which is his birthday), the students of Beacon Hills High pull pranks on him. In the pilot "Wolf Moon", Finstock is the first to notice Scott's improvement on the lacrosse field and puts him on first line. In "Second Chance At First Line", he tells Scott to play at the first game despite Scott claiming he has issues with anger. In "The Tell", during the parent teacher conference, Finstock discusses Stiles with Sheriff Stilinski, including Stiles' inability to concentrate in class despite having good grades. He is later seen amongst a panicked crowd when a mountain lion enters the school car park. In "Heart Monitor", Scott and Stiles use Finstock's heart rate monitor to help Scott control his abilities. Finstock later humiliates Scott in class which nearly causes Scott to wolf out. In "Lunatic", he is forced to put Stiles on first line because of a pink-eye epidemic. In "Wolf's Bane", Finstock promotes Scott to Co-captain of the team alongside Jackson, much to the latter's displeasure. In "Formality", Finstock forbids Scott from going to the dance due to poor grades. When he tries to throw him out, Scott has Danny dance with him and forcing Finstock to back down before he makes a bigger problem. In the season 2 premiere "Omega", Finstock offers "A" grades to any of his players who can help find Lydia who is wandering naked in the woods. He relates a comic story of losing a testicle to hypothermia. In "Shape Shifted", he holds a lacrosse practice session and is continually annoyed by Scott's antics while being the goalie, unaware Scott is actually trying to determine who the new werewolf is by scent, which he discovers to be Isaac. In "Ice Pick", Finstock stumbles upon Scott and Stiles as chains fall out of Stiles' locker and awkwardly leaves the situation. In "Abomination", he pulls Boyd out of the crowd to play lacrosse after an opposing player disables most of the Cyclone's front line. In "Venomous", Finstock witnesses Lydia's breakdown in his class as she writes "Someone Help Me" backwards on the blackboard several times while hallucinating. Later in the episode, he exposes Danny's shredded equipment. In "Raving", Finstock inquiries Stiles about Jackson's absence as the championship game is soon approaching. In the penultimate episode "Battlefield", Finstock gives the same speech heard from Independence Day. During the game, as the players begin to drop like flies, he is forced to send in Scott even though he is on academic probation. In the season 2 finale "Master Plan", despite his loud and eccentric behaviour, Finstock is shown to be concerned about some of his players, especially Scott and his grades to which Scott vows to get his grades back up. In season 3A "Chaos Rising", during a lesson on the "Risk and Reward" principle of economics, Finstock is surprised by Scott's new found knowledge. He demonstrates the well known college drinking game "quarters". In "Unleashed", during a cross country session, he helps Sheriff Stilinski clear away bystanders after a teenage boy is found dead in the woods. Finstock assumes the dead boy was some homeless guy until Scott tells him that the boy was a senior at school. In "Frayed", Finstock takes the Cross Country team for a meet while Scott and his friends recover from their recent attack on the Alpha Pack. During the trip, Finstock chastises Jared for being carsick. In "Motel California", when the meet is postponed until the following day, Finstock takes the team to the Motel Glen Capri for the night. In the morning, he announces that the meet has been cancelled. Lydia discovers wolfsbane in Finstock's whistle, meaning that each time he blew it on the bus, everyone was dosed with the poison. In season 3B "Anchors", Finstock is attempting to teach the difference between Gross Domestic Product (GDP) and Gross National Product (GNP) when Stiles slips into a waking nightmare. Finstock blows his whistle which snaps him out it. In "Galvanise", he falls victim to pranks from Scott and Stiles due to the fact that it is his birthday. In "Illuminated", he reminds everyone that there is a curfew using a bullhorn. In "Letharia Vulpina", Finstock walks into one of the Nogitsune's traps when he steps over a trip wire and is shot with an arrow. In the penultimate episode "Insatiable", he helps Scott's friends get an Eichen House escapee (Meredith) away from Brunski whom he seems to have a past with. In the season 3 finale "The Divine Move", he shows Malia around the school, telling her about how she will adjust pretty quickly. In season 4 "Muted", as the lacrosse season resumes, Finstock supervises tryouts and finds interest in Liam and even Kira who technically did not tryout. In "I.E.D", during the first scrimmage, he refuses to sit out Liam at Scott's request. He benches Kira for failing to pass even though she scored a goal. In "Orphaned", he instructs his players to find Garrett after it is discovered he is a killer. He is later seen in his office feeling sick. In "Weaponised", Finstock is the first to be infected by a weaponised virus via an inkpad. Later, he fully recovers. In "Perishable", he warns his players about responsible drinking at the annual bonfire. In the penultimate episode "A Promise To The Dead", he gives Malia a test back with an "F" on it. In the season 4 finale "Smoke And Mirrors", when Scott, Stiles and Liam found out that they missed practice, they try to explain to Finstock that Scott and Kira were in Mexico on a date and Stiles and Liam went to bring them back. In season 5B episode "A Credible Threat", it is revealed Finstock has been in rehab for 7 months. When Scott and Stiles went to visit him, he reveals that he has been purposely relapsing just to stay there. Scott and Stiles convince him to return for a charity game to forfeit, but he is determined to win as usual. When a loud squeal fills all the speakers during the game, Finstock comments that he "should've stayed in rehab". In season 6A "Superposition", Finstock breaks up an extra credit session as he believes the teens are wasting their youth, even calling them losers. He tells them to live their lives while they still can before kicking them out of the school. In "Relics", Finstock appoints Liam as the new captain of the lacrosse team. During the game, Finstock wrongly assumes that Liam was still on the field playing despite the heavy rain when in reality, he was fighting the Ghost Riders. After the game, Finstock names Liam the new captain of the lacrosse team.
Adrian Harris	Adam Fristoe	1, 2, 3	Human
Adrian Harris is the chemistry teacher at Beacon Hills High School. Harris sadistically pressures students in class when they don't pay attention, quizzing them quite often and gives indirect insults to Stiles. In "Wolf's Bane", Harris is questioned by Sheriff Stilinski regarding the murderous events that take place during Season 1 after the Alpha werewolf tries to kill him. Harris reveals that six years ago, he babbled to a woman on how to set a house on fire and make it look like it was not an act of arson after she got him drunk. A few days after he gave this information, a house caught on fire and was burned down (the Hale family mass murder). The woman he gave information to is revealed to be Kate Argent. In Season 2, Harris is believed to be the Kanima's Master, because his car was stolen by the Master and was identified to be at the presence of several of the murder sites. He was proven innocent by Stiles and Scott. During Season 3, in episode "Unleashed", it is revealed Harris was a former military officer and so he was sacrificed as a Warrior. Before he was abducted from his classroom, he left behind a clue to the gang in his test papers allowing Deaton to identify the killer as a Darach. He begged for his life, saying the Darach still needs him. He knew who and also about this person's motives, but the Darach kills him. Later in "Currents", Stiles uncovers Danny's proposed telluric currents project for Harris along with a note to Danny directly from Harris to stay away from the subject. This allows them to figure out the Darach's abductions and sacrifices are aligned with the telluric currents around Beacon Hills, and that Harris wasn't only sacrificed, he knew something. It is implied that eventually Harris' body was found off-screen since Sheriff Stilinski had labeled him when he was investigating possible supernatural explanations of some crimes.
Alan Deaton	Seth Gilliam	1, 2, 3, 4, 5, 6	Druid
Alan Deaton is the veterinarian at the Beacon Hills Animal Clinic, the older brother of guidance counselor Marin Morrell, and Scott's boss. Deaton is calm and collected, inscrutable, a compassionate, dedicated pacifist, and has a mysterious past. He is a father figure to Scott, and overtime becomes a mentor to all of Scott's Pack, due to his vast knowledge, experience with the supernatural. In Season 3, his role is revealed to be a Druid emissary. During Season 1, Sheriff Stilinski goes to Deaton for help when the murders are implied to be animal attacks. Deaton, however, apparently knows more than he lets on. In "Co-Captain", after Scott is shot with a wolfsbane laced bullet by Kate Argent, Deaton finds Scott and treats him revealing that aside from working with animals, he also works with werewolves, healing them. In "Formality", Deaton remains calm when Peter Hale, the Alpha werewolf comes for Scott. Peter is repelled by the clinic's balustrade is made of mountain ash. In Season 2, Deaton helps Scott, Stiles, and Derek and his Pack against the Kanima. Deaton is later visited by Ms. Morrell, the school guidance counselor and French teacher, who confronts Deaton over the wisdom of having Scott and his allies dealing with the current situation and "what's coming". Deaton reveals to Derek in "Fury" that he had been a trusted adviser to the Hale family for a long time and that he made a promise to Derek's mother that he would help Derek and look after him if anything were to happen to her. Deaton helped Scott prepare the mountain ash laced pills to swap with Gerard's cancer medication when Scott figured out Gerard's plan to be Bitten by Derek. In the Season 2 finale, after Gerard's plan fails, he and Morrell begin tracking him, Morrell saying she is glad he is out of retirement. It is revealed that the upcoming threat Deaton and Morrell mentioned was an Alpha Pack. In Season 3, Deaton has taken on a mentor-like figure to Scott and all his friends. In the episode "Unleashed", Stiles comes to him concerning a new killer committing Human Sacrifices, having linked the murders to the Druid order, and that he always seems to have more information than anyone else. When Stiles demands why he is always so cryptic and withdrawing, Deaton alludes to a dark past that presumably caused him to go into retirement when he answers that spending the past decade "trying to push something away" with the lies and the denial becomes a pretty habit. When Lydia calls saying the music teacher has been taken for to be sacrificed he helps Stiles and Lydia identify the new killer as a Darach. He also identifies the pattern of the sacrifices of being groups of three offering the Darach its type of power - Virgins, Healers, Philosophers, Warriors. It is discovered Marin is actually his younger sister, and that they are both Emissaries, Druid practitioners, that function as advisers to the werewolf Packs and ambassadors between them and humanity. Deaton fulfilled this role for the Hale family, and was especially close to Derek's mother, Talia Hale. In "Alpha Pact", he helps Scott, Stiles and Allison find their parents, by proposing they take a sacrificial Druid ritual in order to locate the Nemeton which will have consequences for them, leaving a "scar" around their hearts for the rest of their lives and being substitute Guardian sacrifices for the parents which will fully revitalize the Nemeton, subsequently attracting the supernatural to Beacon Hills like a magnet. They decide to do it, to sacrifice themselves temporarily with someone to pull them back as a tether. Deaton fulfilled this role for Scott. Later, Deaton, with help from Cora and Lydia, saves the lives of the twins, Ethan and Aiden after they're nearly killed by the Darach. In "Anchors", Scott and Stiles come to Deaton concerning their and Allison's symptoms as a result of the Druid sacrifice. He informs them that when they died and subsequently resurrected, they essentially opened 'a door' in their minds which is still ajar. He tells them an opening into their minds is dangerous, that they each need to 'close that door'. When it is revealed the Nogitsune is possessing Stiles, Deaton heads to Japan in "Letharia Vulpina", to retrieve a sample of a plant called letharia vulpina that was born out of the blood of the very Nogitsune Argent saw killed 24 years earlier, which makes the plant "quite special". Upon arriving back in Beacon Hills, he poisons Stiles with the plant which temporarily breaks the Nogitsune's hold over Stiles. After Scott retrieves the Shugendō scroll in "Echo House", which has instructions on how to exorcise a Nogitsune, Deaton translates that the host's body has to be changed. In "The Divine Move", Deaton confirms that the Hales' triskele urn could imprison the Nogitsune because it was crafted by Deaton himself, out of wood of the Nemeton tree. At Season 3B end, after Allison's death, Deaton provides counsel for Scott with the fallacy "Regression to the Mean", saying things will stop being all bad, or all good and always revert to a neutral space. In Season 4, Deaton sets out to learn what Kate did to Derek, causing him to revert to being a teenager, the subsequent loss of his werewolf abilities and what it means for him. He visits an inmate at Eichen House's prison for supernaturals, Gabriel Valack. When Valack asks him why, Deaton answers he made a promise to a woman he loved (Talia Hale) that he would look after Derek. Valack inflicts a psychic vision upon Deaton concerning La Iglesia. Lydia snaps Deaton out of his vegetative state with a Scream. Deaton tells the Pack the old Mexican church is where Scott and Kira will be found after they're abducted by Kate. In Season 5, "Parasomnia" Deaton examines the claws of the mutant werewolf who attacked Scott. He is concerned that he seemed to be able to absorb Scott's power when only Liam should be able to do that. In "Dreamcatcher", he examines new supernatural Tracy Stewart after her killing spree and keeps her sealed within a mountain ash barrier. Tracy, however, escapes through the barrier. After Tracy is killed, Deaton stores her corpse in the clinic and studies her. He reports to Scott Tracy had the claws of a werewolf but the venom and scales of a kanima. He also realizes the werewolf mutant and Tracy couldn't be supernatural, born or Bitten: they had to have been artificially made. Deaton is shaken saying someone has blurred the lines between science and the supernatural, changing the rules. He tells Scott he has to leave for a few days. In "Ouroboros", Deaton is in Russia, and discovers an old lair used by the Dread Doctors. He takes a particular tooth out of a container calling it "an answer". Right afterwards, Deaton is confronted and captured by the assassin, the Desert Wolf who interrogates him on whether her daughter (Malia) is alive or not. The werecoyote takes him hostage across the borders. In "The Sword and the Spirit", Deaton is used as bait for a trap for Malia by the Desert Wolf. Deaton moves his gag free, and stops the Desert wolf (Corrine) from killing Malia saying to regain her full powers by killing Malia, she has to kill her on the full moon. Malia rescues Deaton from the Beast of Gévaudan and he reunites with Scott, giving his surrogate son a tight hug. In "Amplification", Deaton shows Scott and Stiles the only living evidence of Valack's experimentation on supernaturals, revealing what will happen when Lydia is subjected to trephanation. Her dying Scream will be so powerful, it will kill her and everyone else around her. In "Lie Ability", after the Pack rescues Lydia from Eichen House, Deaton saves Lydia by pasting her trepanation hole with mistletoe. It succeeds and Lydia recovers. In the season 5 finale "Apotheosis", Deaton examines the Surgeon after he has been mortally wounded by the Beast. When Liam asks how he is going to keep the Surgeon alive, Deaton is unsure if the Dread Doctor is still alive. He realises that there's a possibility Mason is still alive inside Sebastien Valet as a spark of energy since energy can't just disappear. Later, he stabilises Hayden's mortal injuries after Sebastien wounds her. In season 6A "Superposition", Deaton examines the blue shard of glass from the sheriff's impound as Scott tells him that pieces of his memory are missing. Deaton suggests that Scott's subconscious is trying to tell him what is missing. The easiest way to figure this out would be to sleep. Later in the episode, as Lydia is tapping into her subconscious through automatic writing, Deaton explains how the Wild Hunt does not just take people, it erases them from reality.
Natalie Martin	Susan Walters	1, 2, 3, 4, 5, 6	Human
Natalie Martin is Lydia's mother, divorced from Mr. Martin, her husband and who Lydia currently lives with. Natalie is a wealthy socialite, vivacious, sometimes shallow-minded and sarcastic, but a loving, competent mother to Lydia as well as a teacher and counselor at Beacon Hills High school in later seasons. Natalie is kept out of the loop regarding the supernatural status and activities of Lydia and her friends, and that of Beacon Hills until Season 5. Natalie is not on good terms with her divorced husband accusing him of forcing Lydia to choose which parent she would rather live with during the parent teacher conference in Season 1 "The Tell". Natalie is seen at her daughter's bedside after she was attacked by Peter Hale in "Code Breaker". In Season 2 "Abomination", because of Lydia's behavior due to the deceased Peter's control of her, she wants Lydia to see Ms. Morrell, the high school guidance counselor, and becomes all the more resolved when she sees her daughter's hand bleeding from punching a mirror. In Season 3 episode, "Alpha Pact", Natalie comforts Lydia after Jennifer Blake tried to kill her by strangulation. She tells Lydia she could have the marks covered with make-up, using a patented method she had of covering up her own fair "share of hickies" when she was in high school. Lydia instead tells Natalie, she does not want to cover the wound, saying someone tried to kill her, she survived, and she does not have to hide that. Natalie is surprised at, but later approves of Lydia's maturity. In Season 3B, Natalie takes the position of biology teacher at the high school after Adrian Harris is found dead. Lydia is somewhat embarrassed by this, but Natalie asks Lydia not to embarrass her. In "Letharia Vulpina", Natalie is seen talking to Peter Hale at the school, to Lydia's distress. Natalie tells her Peter said he is in Health department to give hearing tests to patients, but Lydia figures out this is a subtle message by Peter offering to help Lydia control her banshee ability. Lydia tells her mom the card he gave her is a phone number. Natalie brightly replies, "I know. Still got it." In Season 4, "The Benefactor", Natalie allows Lydia and her friends use the Martins' lakehouse, but asks her to lock up the basement because she thinks a "pack of wild animals" managed to get in (Malia's use of the basement to keep herself restrained during full moons). When the juniors are taking the PSATs in "Weaponized", Natalie oversees the examinations. She notices red and white lesions on Sydney, a student who had collapsed, and Coach Finstock. She promptly calls in the CDC. Natalie hopes she is wrong, and she'll be "the crazy biology teacher who panicked for nothing". In "Time of Death", Natalie notices Lydia's escapades to the lakehouse. She asks her daughter if she can help with anything. Lydia shows her the photo of Meredith Walker, who Natalie recognizes. Natalie tells her daughter the story of her paternal grandmother, Lorraine Martin who was interned at Eichen House. In Season 5 "Parasomnia", Natalie is holding a session with a senior, Tracy Stewart. Tracy tells her she is having trouble sleeping, she gets night terrors. She assures Tracy her problems could be just anxiety, which most seniors experience. Suddenly, Tracy vomits up black barf along with raven feathers all over Natalie's desk. Natalie acts rationally telling Lydia people with night terrors have done far stranger things than "eating their pillows". In "Dreamcatchers", Natalie had been asked out on a date by Stilinski and they meet at the station. Suddenly they notice several deputies paralyzed. Lydia and Kira appear with Lydia yelling at Natalie saying Tracy's coming for her. Natalie is confused, but then Tracy attacks, jumping down off the roof. A horrified Natalie sees Tracy, in her kanima shape with a tail and glowing yellow eyes, in plain view. Tracy eventually paralyzes Natalie, but she is saved by Malia who takes Tracy down. In the aftermath, Natalie is shaken, but upon seeing Lydia bleeding, she rushes to her daughter's side. In the hospital, Natalie comforts Lydia as she is going into surgery. Lydia implores her mother to keep quiet about what she saw. Natalie responds all she saw was some "lunatic girl trying to kill everyone", after a moment of hesitation. In "Lies of Omission", Natalie holds a class, when a Chimera named Beth runs out of the class. Natalie tells a following Malia to leave Beth alone and that "all of them" should get back to school work. Malia calls Natalie out that she "knows something" and flashes her werecoyote eyes. Natalie isn't surprised at all, but willfully overlooks this display and insists the kids focus on school. In "The Last Chimera", when Lydia is rendered catatonic, Natalie is distressed and out of fear for her daughter's life, angrily refuses to allow Stiles to see her, blaming him and her friends for her state of mind. She later signs for Lydia to be transferred to Eichen House with Dr. Conrad Fenris (actually Valack in glamour) promising her Lydia will be taken care of. In "The Sword and the Spirit", Natalie maintains her belief that Lydia is save at Eichen House and that she is being prepped for legal and medical electroshock therapy, in spite of Stiles' protests. In "Amplification", Stilinski visits Natalie over Lydia's situation. Stilinski rebukes her insistence for rational explanations handing her a folder. Inside are photos from Deaton displaying Valack's trepanation experimentation at Eichen House and Melissa's police statement to Stilinski detailing the supernatural. Natalie is left unnerved and horrified. She visits Eichen House buzzing, requesting to see her daughter. She finds guards mauled, the institution goes into lockdown and has a determined look in her eye as she picks up an electrical prod. Afterwards, Natalie sees Lydia with Scott's Pack and her daughter is taken hostage by Tracy Stewart. Natalie shocks the emotionless Chimera, and drops all her denial and willful ignorance demanding that "someone please get (her) daughter out of this hellhole." Lydia is treated at Deaton's animal clinic and has her trepanation wound healed. Natalie shows herself to a surprised Lydia and embraces her daughter. In the season 6 premiere "Memory Lost", Natalie prevents Scott and Stiles from skipping class as Scott already has 38 missed classes, explaining to the two of them that they can protect the town at 3:30, after school ends. That night, when a body is found at the school, she runs into Stiles, but she does not seem to know him, as if they had never met. In "Superposition", Natalie enters Lydia's room after hearing her scream. Lydia explains that she saw a train passing through her room but Natalie thinks it was a nightmare. In "Sundowning", Natalie allows Malia to make up her test inside her office. When Malia becomes stressed, Natalie suggests that Malia relax by breathing in. However, this does not work as Malia shifts into her coyote form and leaves the office. In "Relics", Natalie confronts Lydia about tearing the wallpaper off the wall at the Stilinski house. She then discovers that Lydia is checking into Claudia's past. Natalie has known Claudia since they were teenagers and she trusts her. In "Heartless", Natalie finds Lydia lying in bed, deep in thought. She asks Lydia what she is thinking about. Lydia tells her about Caleb, how his mum Lenore conjured him to fill the void. Lydia believes the Sheriff is doing the same with Claudia. Natalie is skeptical about this and tells Lydia that if it is true, she shouldn't be the one to tell the Sheriff. In "Memory Found", Natalie's voice is heard in one of Lydia's flashbacks while under hypnosis.
Danny Mahealani	Keahu Kahuanui	1, 2, 3	Human
Danny Mahealani was Jackson's best friend, the former boyfriend of the werewolf Ethan and is good friends with Stiles and Scott. His last name is Hawaiian for "full moon". He is one of the Beacon Hills High in-crowd and is openly gay. He is the goalie on the lacrosse team and also plays trumpet in the school band. Danny often tries to calm Jackson down when he is angry or frustrated. He also seems to have befriended Scott and Stiles in indirect ways. Stiles often wonders aloud if Danny finds him attractive, comments which Danny usually ignores, but once returns by snidely offering to sleep with Stiles. In Season 2, Danny helps Jackson recover lost footage from his camera which Jackson shot for his first full moon transformation with Jackson's instruction not to watch the footage. He manages to do so with help from Matt Daehler whom he is attracted to. He does not act on his attraction because Matt's into Allison. In "Frenemy", he is shown to be depressed over his break-up with his ex-boyfriend at the gay club, Jungle. Presumably, because the Kanima's Master wanted to remove any evidence, Danny is attacked at the club, but is only paralyzed by the Kanima and the footage Danny recovered from Jackson's video has vanished. In the episode, "Battlefield", he is warned by Jackson to not get anywhere near him during the lacrosse finals game, most likely because Jackson is somehow aware he is the Kanima and is killing people. In Season 3, Danny develops an interest in Ethan, one of the Alpha pack, unaware that Ethan was originally using him to get leverage on Scott. Although Danny does not realize it, his relationship with Ethan softens the werewolf to the point where he is willing to change for the better going as far as meeting Scott and Stiles halfway. In episode 7 "Currents", Danny is lethally poisoned with mistletoe by the Darach and his lung collapses. Ethan, obviously excessively worried about Danny, helps him to the hospital, where Melissa McCall saves his life using a needle thoracostomy. It is revealed Danny was targeted by the Darach because he did a project on telluric currents which were placed on the locations of where the Darach was sacrificing his victims. Despite the fact that Ethan was only supposed to manipulate Danny's feelings to gain information, as Aiden had been assigned to do with Lydia, he eventually fell in love with Danny and is shown to have several tender moments with him. However, in season 3B, after their separation and Ethan and Aiden later decide to re-enroll in high school, Danny is shown making out with Damon, his ex, which Ethan is clearly upset about, to Aiden's amusement. In "Illuminated", because of the power outage, Danny wants to hold a black light party, but is cut down. Ethan and Aiden help him out by acquiring a power generator and letting him use Derek's loft for the party. Danny is very pleased with the results and bonds with Ethan again. In "Letharia Vulpina", Danny is seen with the cross country team on the track where traps are laid by the Nogitsune and Ethan tackles him to protect him and says he missed Danny and proceeds to make out with him. When Coach Finstock is shot by an arrow triggered by a trip wire, Danny looks on while Ethan stays protectively beside him. In "The Divine Move", Ethan comes to break up with Danny, saying he can't stay after Aiden's death. Danny lets Ethan down gently, breaking up with him instead, saying that while he likes Ethan, he can't date a werewolf - Danny was aware of the supernatural all along, to Ethan's surprise. Ethan gives Danny a kiss goodbye. Show creator Jeff Davis reveals at the SDCC 2015 Danny graduated early during junior year. Teen Wolf: The Hunt, a Teen Wolf-inspired social network game, states that Danny was born on Leap Day (February 29) and likes computers and photography. He is a fan of Jay-Z, Bruno Mars, and Janelle Monáe.
Kate Argent	Jill Wagner	1, 3, 4, 6	Nagual
Katherine "Kate" Argent is Allison's aunt and Argent's sister. Throughout the series, Kate is a member of the Argent family of werewolf-hunters in Season 1 until her death, then a werejaguar returning in Season 4. Kate makes her first appearance in episode 4 "Magic Bullet" when she arrives in Beacon Hills to help her family hunt down the Alpha werewolf, then poisons and nearly kills Derek Hale. Unlike Argent, Kate is bloodthirsty, deadly and cruel, taking pleasure in hurting any werewolf she can. Kate is also very rife with sexual innuendo, using her sexuality to her advantage. Kate was responsible for orchestrating the Hale Fire, murdering Derek Hale's family six years previously. Despite her being a sadist, Kate is close to her niece Allison, whom she gives a necklace which depicts a wolf for her 17th birthday in "The Tell". Kate is revealed to have been the woman who got chemistry teacher Adrian Harris intoxicated at a bar and had him reveal to her how to start a fire "and get away with arson" as Harris relayed to Sheriff Stilinski in "Wolf's Bane". However Harris also drew him a necklace he saw Kate wearing that night, the same necklace she gave to Allison. In "Formality", Kate reveals the supernatural to Allison by showing her a captured Derek in werewolf. In the past, Kate also had a sexual relationship with a younger Derek Hale simply to track down the Hale Pack and set their house on fire. In the Season 1 finale, Kate lies to Allison that all werewolves are monsters and entices Allison to join her in the hunt for Derek and Scott after it is discovered Scott is the other Beta werewolf. She nearly executes Scott, but Argent stops her, confronting her about her involvement in the Hale fire and threatens to shoot her if she does not lower her gun. Peter Hale, the Alpha werewolf arrives at that moment and takes everyone down before capturing Kate. Peter demands Kate apologize for decimating his family if she wants to save Allison. Though faced with death, Kate apologizes only to Allison. Kate is later killed by Peter as revenge for the Hale Fire, slashing her throat. After Peter Hale is killed, the necklace is left on Kate's corpse as evidence for her part in the arson. During Season 3B, Kate appears in visions and nightmares to Allison as a result of Allison's Druid sacrifice. In the Season 3 finale, it is revealed Kate survived Peter's attempt on her life. She appears and attacks a team of the Calavera hunters in Derek's loft before shooting Derek himself and abducting him. Kate had become supernatural as she transforms into a shapeshifter, a werejaguar, because Peter had slashed her throat. It is depicted in flashbacks Kate's body had begun to heal after she was killed with Peter's claws: she was coming back to life. The Calavera hunters inconspicuously came to check if Kate was really dead and saw her transforming instead. They switched out Kate's body from the morgue and took her to Mexico. They demanded Kate kill herself to follow the Hunter's Code. Instead Kate faked her suicide, and when the hunters inspected her, she killed half a dozen of Araya's men and escaped. Kate lacked control over her shapeshifting, leaving a trail of bodies behind her. Kate was instinctively drawn to La Iglesia, the ruins of an Aztec temple which worshipped Tezcatlipoca, a werejaguar god. With her own werejaguar status, Kate discovered a pair of Berserkers and gained control of the two monsters giving herself muscle and protection. While in hiding, Kate discovered a cassette someone had anonymously left her; the tape revealed information about the Hale Pack, specifically their artifact, the Triskelion. The artifact was used by the Hales teach their young control on a full moon. Needing to learn control, Kate decided to acquire the Triskelion, which lead to her kidnapping Derek. In "The Dark Moon", it is revealed Kate had taken Derek to La Iglesia. Using the power of her species' god, Kate had Derek regressed to the time of his life before she would set the fire when he was in love with her. In "117", Kate has Derek reveal the location of the Hale Vault to her and has the Berserkers hold off Scott and his Pack. Derek hands her the Triskelion. Peter arrives just then totally amused, letting Kate know the Triskelion does not have magic that teaches a shapeshifter control, it was a physical placebo for young Betas to focus on. Angered, Kate faces off against Peter, but smoke bombs go off by an unseen figure. In the chaos, Kate escapes and calls off the Berserkers. Kate had been tricked into opening the Hale Vault so the Benefactor could steal the Hales' fortune, to use for financing the Dead Pool. As assassins begin arriving in Beacon Hills over Season 4 for the money, Kate begins a manhunt for the Benefactor, who she realizes left her the cassette to find, leading her to killing 'the Orphans', then confronting Scott and Argent. She tells Argent she needs more time for learning control before eventually confronting him. When the Berserkers overpower them she spares Argent's life when one Berserker almost kills him. Kate is later approached by Peter, her would-be killer. She accepts his deal, he offers her control over her shapeshifting, she helps him get his money back and help to implement his plan to kill Scott unaware he plans to stab her in the back. Kate masters control later on. She attacks Scott and Kira in "A Promise to The Dead", abducting them and taking them to La Iglesia. Kate had learned from Peter her species, the werejaguar, as "La Loba", she has the talent not only to control the Berserkers, but also to create new ones using a vessel. Kate has Scott transformed into a Berserker planning to have him fight his friends so to have them kill him, or vice versa. In "Smoke and Mirrors", Kate faces off against Scott's allies along with the Calaveras. Her and Peter's plan to kill Scott and his Pack fails. She kills hunters, but she is taken down by Derek who severely mauls her in his new full wolf shapeshift, and being shot by Argent with a yellow monkshood laced bullet. Kate appeals to her brother saying her intentions were to have their family return to power after its decimation, and to have Scott and his Pack killed because she blames them for Allison's death, saying they killed her. Kate tells Argent she knows he won't kill her and escapes.
Isaac Lahey	Daniel Sharman	2, 3	Werewolf
Isaac Lahey is a Beta werewolf, Allison's second boyfriend, and Scott's close friend and former roommate. Isaac was Bitten by Derek Hale as an Alpha werewolf. In the past Isaac was abused and tormented by his father, who tortured him by often locking him in their basement freezer. His mother is also deceased and his older brother Camden was killed in combat overseas. Isaac was the first member of Derek's Pack, though he joins Scott's Pack later on. Isaac asked to become a werewolf to feel powerful and confident after all the abuse from his father, who is murdered by the Kanima at the beginning of Season 2 (after they had an argument and his long-abusive father threw plates and pitchers at him). Isaac was the first of Derek's Beta werewolves to gain control of his animal side during the full moon, and in spite of his dark family-life, Isaac has good intentions and a warm heart. At first, Isaac did not like Scott and did not trust him, because he believed Scott was a loser because he wondered how Scott survived so long without a pack. Nevertheless, he eventually trusted Scott when he realized he has good intentions, and becomes friends with him. Among the dangerous events throughout Season 2, Isaac sides with Scott, revealing that he trusts him and holds onto Scott's friendship because he does not have anyone there for him. He helps Scott against Gerard when Gerard takes control of the Kanima, but he is stabbed by Allison. After Jackson is cured of being a Kanima and Gerard's defeat, Isaac stays as a part of Derek's Pack instead of following Boyd and Erica, but holds onto Scott's friendship. At the start of Season 3A, Isaac is revealed to have found where the Alphas have been keeping Erica and Boyd, however he was attacked by them and had his memory wiped. Isaac was rescued by a mysterious woman. To cure his amnesia, Deaton helps Isaac remember the night he had his memory wiped using an ice bath, looking into his eye, and remembers that Erica is already dead, while Boyd is being held captive by the Alphas with another werewolf named Cora. He later participates in helping Scott and Derek capture Boyd and Cora, who are rabid from the full moon with assistance from Argent. Isaac takes on a despise the twins, Aiden and Ethan, blaming them for the supposed death of the girl who saved him and the numerous sacrifices, and stands off against them. Allison apologizes to Isaac for attacking him back in Season 2 and assists him in his vendetta against the twins. He teams up with her against the threats throughout the season becoming closer, eventually forgiving and developing feelings for her. After being thrown out of Derek's loft by Derek to protect him from Derek himself, he moves in with Scott and Melissa. In "Alpha Pact", Isaac later becomes fed up over Derek's intentions, the deaths of Boyd and Erica, and confronts him about how people always get hurt around him and his pursuit of power, leading to him rejecting Derek as his Alpha and leaving Derek's Pack. Isaac is chosen to be Allison's tether when she undertakes a dangerous druid ritual to find her father. During the mid-season finale, he helps Allison, Stiles, and Scott find their parents. With Scott becoming a True Alpha, Isaac joins his Pack. In "Anchors", Isaac starts acting on his feelings towards Allison, even attempting to kiss her, following her for her protection and arriving at her apartment, to her mutual consent. He is open about this with Scott who is evidently uncomfortable at their budding relationship. Isaac still holds a grudge towards Ethan and Aiden saying they can't join Scott's Pack because of their part in Boyd's murder and taking glee when Scott says no. After helping Allison with research on William Barrow, Isaac is confronted and "tagged" by the Oni. He later helps Allison and Argent retrieve information about the Oni, Kitsune and the Nogitsune from the Yakuza recluse, Katashi "Silver finger". He and Allison affirm their feelings for each other when Allison kisses him. Isaac is induced into a coma in "Letharia Vulpina", saving Allison from stepping into electrified water as one of the traps set by the Nogitsune possessing Stiles. In "De-Void", Isaac comes out of his coma and heals from his injuries, to Allison's happiness and they spend the night together, consummating their relationship. In "Insatiable", after Isaac is freed from the Nogitsune's possession, Isaac assists in looking for Lydia. He and Allison share a moment where he assures her he was himself during their night together before the Nogitsune infected him. After arriving at Oak Creek, Isaac fights alongside Allison and Kira against the now Nogitsune-controlled Oni. He is eventually outmatched and by the Oni. He is saved by Allison, who is fatally stabbed by the Oni right afterward. Visibly shocked and stricken, Isaac watches on as Allison dies in Scott's arms. In "The Divine Move", Isaac is devastated by Allison's death and finds comfort from Argent. Later, Isaac figures out that she had discovered that silver was the Oni's weakness and that her arrows could destroy them. Argent and Isaac head to the school with the arrowheads and kill the remaining Oni. After Scott and Kira exorcise the Nogitsune, Isaac seals the dark spirit in Derek's triskele box. At the end of Season 3B, Isaac decides to leave Beacon Hills, moving out of Scott's house and heading off with Argent to France to put away the Nogitsune for good, and help Argent cope with Allison's death. "Teen Wolf: The Hunt", a Teen Wolf-inspired social network game, states that Isaac was born on September 22, and likes lacrosse and BMX. He is a fan of M. Ward, Belle and Sebastian, Coldplay, and Feist.
Matt Daehler	Stephen Lunsford	2	Human
Matt Daehler was a student at Beacon Hills High, a photographer and was on the lacrosse team. Matt was the Kanima's first Master and was the secondary antagonist of Season 2. In "Omega", he takes pictures of Allison at Kate Argent's funeral, but is accosted by Gerard Argent who destroys his camera's memory card. In the episode "Shape-Shifted", he lends Jackson a night-vision camera for Jackson to record his expected full moon transformation. He notices a strange flash in each of his photo shots of Scott McCall in the episode "Venomous" (caused by Scott's uncontrolled werewolf eyes which were triggered by the flash of his camera). In "Restraint", he steals a translated portion of the bestiary depicting the Kanima from Allison's tablet. He takes Allison out on a date to a warehouse party in "Raving", unaware that Allison was only using him to throw her parents off her back about staying away from Scott, where he kisses her but Allison pulls away. In "Party Guessed", Allison finds out he is stalking her upon finding his many inappropriate photos of her. She confronts him about his photos, but when his behavior annoys her, she judo-flips him. Later on he is seen, by Scott, with Jackson in his Kanima state revealing Matt's the Kanima's Master. In 2006, 9-year-old Matt had gone to Isaac Lahey's house to trade superhero comic books with him. The swim team of Beacon Hills High at that time was having a pool party at the house and drinking alcohol to celebrate their winning the state championship. Matt was thrown into the pool by Camden, Isaac's older brother, despite yelling that he can't swim, resulting in him almost drowning. He was resuscitated by Coach Lahey who berates him about not knowing how to swim and demands he tell no one what happened. Matt obliged keeping the incident secret for years, causing himself trauma and having irregular nightmares where he is drowning. Back during the Argents' funeral, when he was photographing Allison, Lahey had got in one of his shots. Matt'd felt an unbelievable rage for his near-drowning years earlier and wished that Lahey was dead. The following morning he found out Lahey was dead. In "Shape-Shifted" he had spied on Jackson using his camera and witnessed his transformation into the Kanima. He and the Kanima touched hands seemingly by instinct. Through a supernatural bond that formed between the two of them he saw that Jackson had killed Lahey for him and Matt became Master of the Kanima. He used the Kanima to murder all members of the swim team who were involved in the incident, except for Jessica Bartlet whom he killed directly. In "Fury", at the Sheriff's station, Matt has Jackson murder all the deputies on night shift, destroys all the evidence linking him to the murders and takes Scott, Stiles, Derek, Stilinski and Melissa hostage. He reveals he knows all about the supernatural events occurring and demands Scott hand over the bestiary. He needed answers as to why he was beginning to transform into the Kanima, but Derek silently realized Matt had broken the rules of the Kanima. The Master is to use the Kanima to kill murderers, while Matt had him kill innocent people and he had killed people himself. The hunters attack the building and in the struggle between the Argents, Jackson, and Scott and Derek, Matt escapes but Gerard kills him by drowning him, using this opportunity to become the Kanima's new Master. As a result of his childhood trauma, Matt became a teenage killer, psychologically unstable, dangerous. He irrationally called Lahey and the swim team murderers saying they 'murdered' him. He was also a stalker, relentlessly pursuing Allison by taking photos of her and photo shopping himself into these pictures depicting they were in a relationship. As Master of the Kanima, Matt gained abilities to control the Kanima through a supernatural bond. He could communicate with Jackson telepathically, control him also as a human, sense him from a distance and speak through him. The bond between Master and Kanima was affected akin to Matt's personality; Jackson, as the Kanima would share his fear of water, and his affinity for photography: to target a victim, Matt just had to take their picture or think about killing them, then Jackson would kill them.
Gerard Argent	Michael Hogan	2, 3, 5, 6	Human
Gerard Argent is Allison's grandfather, Argent and Kate's father, and a werewolf hunter. Gerard is a psychopath, ruthless, selfish, deceitful, and shows no remorse for any life he threatens or takes, even his own. Gerard first arrives in Beacon Hills for his daughter Kate's funeral, though he declares vengeance for her death; to signify this he kills an innocent Omega werewolf the hunters trapped cutting him in half, declares that there is no more Code and that the Argents will kill all werewolves they find, regardless of their innocence. In "Shape-Shifted", Gerard goes undercover as the principal at Beacon Hills High. When Gerard figures out that Scott is a werewolf in "Abomination", he blackmails Scott into following his orders by threatening to kill Melissa. Scott complies supplying him with information and becoming a member in Derek's Pack. Gerard heartlessly endorses that Victoria must kill herself after Derek Bites her and uses her death to emotionally manipulate Allison into joining him. In "Fury", Gerard kills Matt Daehler and becomes the Kanima's new Master. He then steps up as the main threat, threatening Melissa McCall's life again, and abducting and beating Stiles as a message to Scott. In the Season 2 finale, during the showdown at the industrial warehouse between Scott, Derek, Isaac, Argent, Allison, and Jackson as the Kanima, Gerard surprisingly has the Kanima hold Allison hostage. It comes out that he has cancer; all of Gerard's scheming and his genocide campaign was all a ruse for to push Derek into a position to Bite him, become a werewolf, kill Derek to become an Alpha, to ultimately cure himself. He has the Kanima threaten to kill Allison unless Scott has Derek Bite him. Argent is incensed at his father's actions and betrayal, after he pushed for Victoria's suicide all while what he was planning and threatening his daughter's life. Gerard fires back at Argent he'd kill his son so he'd survive. Scott follows his orders and Gerard is forcibly Bitten by Derek, and he holds his Bitten arm in victory. However, because of a plan by Scott, he and Deaton had replaced Gerard's cancer medication with mountain ash filled capsules. Gerard's body violently rejects the Bite, black ooze eschewing out of his ears, eyes, nose and mouth and he is incapacitated. After Jackson is cured of being a Kanima, Gerard disappears. During Season 3, Gerard is shown to be alive, in hiding and living at a medical home. His cancer has now vanished, but he still uses a wheelchair and is consistently suffering the effects of the rejected Bite, black liquid still pouring out of his orifices. He reveals to Argent that one of their family members in 1977, Alexander Argent, his brother, was bitten by the Alpha werewolf, Deucalion. In "Visionary", Allison and Scott come to him for information about Deucalion's Alpha pack in exchange for Scott siphoning some of his pain. Gerard lies to them about Deucalion ambushing him and killing his men when they met with Deucalion's pack during Deucalion's proposed peace offering, when it was actually Gerard himself who ambushed all involved parties, killing Deucalion's Pack members and killing his own men because they wanted peace with the Packs (which Scott catches onto). He'd also stabbed Deucalion in the eyes with two arrows which caused Deucalion's blindness. Gerard's treachery is what caused Deucalion to become the sociopath he is in the present, and lead to the Alpha Pack being formed. However, he truthfully tells them that while Deucalion is blind, he can actually see in his werewolf form. Scott threatens Gerard; if he finds out that the story he told them about how Deucalion truly lost his eyesight was a lie, and people get hurt, he will return to "take away more than (Gerard's) pain". In Season 5B "Damnatio Memoriae", Gerard, still hospitalized, is visited by Argent. Argent reluctantly produces yellow monkshood to Gerard's surprise. The older man eats the plant's flowers voraciously: he is fully healed of his ailment. Argent tells his father he knows he has kept eyes and ears open. Gerard responds that he knows of the Dread Doctors' success. The creature is a resurrected monster whose only purpose was to just take life wherever it could find it and is also personally connected to their family: the Beast of Gévaudan. In "The Sword and the Spirit", Gerard reveals himself alongside Argent to a stumped Scott, but the meeting is cut short by the sight of the Dread Doctors' terrifying fresco depicting the Beast fighting a creature Gerard identifies as a hellhound, a guardian of supernatural places - amongst bodies littering Beacon Hills. Gerard and Argent then visit Parrish: Gerard informs and confirms Parrish's supernatural species as a hellhound. In "The Maid of Gévaudan", Gerard tells Lydia and Argent the story of their ancestor, Marie-Jeanne Valet who'd slain the original Beast - her own brother, Sebastien Valet. In particular Gerard references the weapon she used to kill Sebastien, the only thing capable of totally killing the Beast, is the mystical Pike she and her husband forged, and that Marie-Jeanne became the first hunter in the Argent family line: that his family name will be remembered once more. He, Argent and Parrish track the Beast just as the monster has killed the Dread Doctors and completely revived as Sebastien Valet. Gerard calls out to Sebastien as "La Bête du Gévaudan" and demands Sebastien to answer him by his name. Sebastien answers Gerard from afar: "Argent". In "Apotheosis", Gerard and Argent recover the Pike (re-forged into the cane used by the Surgeon), and Gerard affirmatively answers that the cane will kill the Beast for sure. Parrish takes on the Beast at spear-point, Gerard readies to kill the ancient werewolf at spear point, ready to strike once both the werewolf and the hellhound are weak enough. Gerard puts a bullet into Deucalion, discovering the alliance between him and Scott to his surprise, holding him and Liam at gun point, but Argent double crosses his father passing the Pike to Scott. He and Scott had known Gerard would eventually stab them all in the back, regardless of how many people would perish and in the end, Gerard's only care would be about immortalizing his own name. Father and son hold each other at gun point: Gerard is shot by Argent. In the end, Gerard snarls at an unapologetic Argent, who departs once again.
Marin Morrell	Bianca Lawson	2, 3	Druid
Marin Morrell is the guidance counselor and French teacher at Beacon Hills High. Throughout Season 2, Marin counseled both Stiles and Lydia through various traumas and helped Allison translate an entry in the Argent's bestiary. It is implied, and confirmed in "Raving", that Marin is aware of the supernatural side of things when she is seen conversing with Deaton concerning the Kanima situation and leaving it all up to Scott and his allies. She asks Deaton is he going to inform them "what's coming". At the end of Season 2, she convinces Deaton to get more involved in the supernatural circle of Beacon Hills and the two start tracking Gerard after his plan fails. At the beginning of Season 3, Marin is revealed to be somehow involved with Deucalion, the Alpha Pack leader. She is actually Deaton's younger sister and they are both practitioner druids called Emissaries that act as advisers to werewolf Packs, liaisons between them and humanity and she supposedly fulfills this role for the Alpha Pack. Marin was originally the Emissary for Deucalion's original Pack and was the only one spared when the Alphas killed off their Packs. In the episode "The Girl Who Knew Too Much", Scott confronts her asking her what Deucalion wants with him. Marin replies he wants to make a killer out of him, because if Scott kills someone he'll destroy his potential to be a True Alpha or have Scott join his Pack, either way Scott is eliminated as a threat to Deucalion. In "Alpha Pact", after the Darach is revealed to be Jennifer Blake, she is seen fleeing from the Alphas in the woods but protects herself with a mountain ash circle. They had suspected her to have had a role to play with the Darach. Marin confronts Deucalion over his ruthlessness in his goal to form his 'perfect pack', that she'd begun to try and stop him. Kali tells her they know she sent the mystery woman to save Isaac and had begun helping Scott and his friends find a way to stop Deucalion. Marin reveals the woman's name was Braeden, that she'd sent Braeden to do what Marin herself does, "maintain balance" and reveals to the other Alphas that Deaton had actually saved Ennis, but Deucalion killed him and lied to them about it being Derek who'd killed him. She tries to tell Kali he intended for her to force Derek's decision to join the Pack, because that paves the way for Deucalion's plans for him and Scott. Deucalion states she is lying and injures her with his cane but Scott saves her and she tells him where they can find the location of the last Druid massacre, the Nemeton. In Season 3B, Marin appears in "Echo House", as a counselor at Eichen House. She acts as Stiles's contact when he voluntarily checks himself in at the institution to prevent the Nogitsune from harming anyone. Marin leads group therapy, which includes Stiles and Malia, discussing the subject of guilt. Stiles and Malia both offer input on the feeling because of the Nogitsune possessing him and Malia over her changing on a full moon causing the death of her mother and little sister. Marin cuts the session short when she notices the electric burn marks on Stiles's neck, the site where Deaton had injected the wolf lichen. Marin supplies Stiles with amphetamines to keep him awake as he needs to avoid sleeping when he'll be most vulnerable to the Nogitsune possession. Marin lets Stiles know if the burns disappear completely, the Nogitsune returns and Scott and Deaton haven't found a cure by then, she will kill him by lethal injection to do what she does: "maintain the balance". Stiles understands and thanks her for the "illicit drugs". After the Nogitsune returns and escapes Eichen, Marin tells Malia where to find Scott so she can join in the hunt for Stiles.
Boyd	Sinqua Walls	2, 3	Werewolf
Vernon Milton Boyd IV, or simply Boyd, was a shy loner at Beacon Hills High School and worked at the Beacon Hills Ice Rink. In the episode "Motel California", when Boyd is hallucinating, poisoned by wolfsbane, it is revealed he had a younger sister named Alicia. She and Boyd had gone ice-skating when Boyd was younger, when Alicia suddenly disappeared and was never seen again. Boyd felt terrible guilt over not watching his sister. In Season 2, he is first seen in episode "Ice Pick". Boyd becomes the third member of Derek's pack, completing the basic requirement for an actual werewolf pack. He joined so he wouldn't have to be the high school loner anymore. For most of the season, he was Derek's right-hand man and physically the strongest Beta werewolf of the pack. Derek treated Boyd distinctly differently from the way he treated Isaac and Erica. Isaac and Erica were sent in like attack dogs, while Derek held Boyd in reserve, as he was more mature and stronger than them. In "Party Guessed", he experiences his first full moon as a werewolf; he goes feral and almost gets loose but is subdued by a more successful Isaac. Boyd was close to Erica. They both became frightened of the Argents' vendetta, especially when the whole Pack had to go on the run and left Derek with her to find another pack at the end of Season 2. The pair are led into a trap by the Argents using recorded wolf howls. Boyd saves Erica from being shot with an arrow by a vengeful Allison, but she relentlessly fires arrows into him, but Argent shoots her bow away saving Boyd's life. After a short altercation with and capture by the Argents, Argent rebels against his family and sets them free. He and Erica attempt to flee Beacon Hills, but are trapped by the Alpha pack, leaving their fate uncertain. In Season 3, it is revealed that Boyd and possibly Erica were alive and had been held captive by the Alpha pack for four months in the abandoned Beacon Hills First National Bank. During this four-month period, he and Erica had a heart-to-heart about them possibly becoming stronger during the lunar eclipse. Erica tried to fight back against the Alphas, but was killed. Boyd and Cora, Derek's younger sister who was also captured, were refrained from fully transforming during the full moons, by the hecatolite lined in the bank vault keeping the full moon from reaching them. This caused their rage and bloodlust to build up inside for months. He became friends with Cora over this experience. Upon being found by Derek and Scott, both of them lost all control and escaped into the woods to kill whomever they came across. They were later subdued by Derek, with assistance from Scott, Isaac and Argent. Boyd re-joined Derek's Pack and returned to school still upset over the death of Erica. He participated in the battle against the Alpha pack, taking on Ennis with Cora, but is easily defeated by them. Knowing that Kali would eventually come to kill Derek to "avenge" Ennis' death, Boyd came up with a plan to weaken Kali using electrified water. The plan failed when the Alphas cut the power to the building. During Derek's fight with Kali, Boyd is held captive by Kali and she has the twins Ethan and Aiden hold Derek's claws upward. Kali then kills Boyd by impaling him upon Derek's claws, causing the latter to absorb Boyd's powers and see his memory of Erica's death, which shatters him. Dying, Boyd comforts Derek by telling him to not blame himself and that the sensation of the full moon was worth everything.
Erica Reyes	Gage Golightly	2, 3	Werewolf
Erica Reyes was a student at Beacon Hills who suffered from epilepsy. Her father, Mr. J. Reyes, was the insurance adjuster who investigated the car crash that killed Gordon and Margaret Miller, Jackson Whittemore's biological parents in 1995, and who also withholds the insurance settlement Jackson is to receive upon his eighteenth birthday for their deaths. At the hospital after a seizure in "Ice Pick", Derek seduces her with the Bite, promising her that not only her epilepsy would go away, along with the side-effects, but she would become even better. Erica accepted the Bite, becoming a Beta werewolf and the second member of Derek's Pack. She changed remarkably, her originally timid, self-conscious personality becoming more confident, exploitive, snarky, flirtatious and stylish. She revealed that she used to have a huge crush on Stiles, but he never noticed her since he was "too busy" with his crush to Lydia. Erica was shown to be close to both Isaac and Boyd throughout the season, and repeatedly antagonized Allison. Erica had hit on Scott twice, hinting that she was attracted to him. She along with the rest of the Pack, attempted to stop the Kanima and goes rabid on her first full moon and has to be restrained by Derek. Near the end of Season 2, terrified of the Argents' werewolf genocide she and Boyd decide to leave Derek to find a new Pack, becoming Omega werewolves in the process, but are led into a trap by the Argents. Erica is almost killed by a corrupted Allison, angry over her mother's death, but Boyd saves her life catching the arrow but is plummeted by arrows from Allison. Erica hysterically begs Allison to stop when she readies a seventh shot, but Boyd is saved by Argent. In the Season 2 finale, they were held hostage by Gerard, but were freed by Argent. While fleeing again, Erica and Boyd were trapped by the Alpha pack. During Season 3, it is revealed that she and Boyd were held captive by the Alpha Pack in the abandoned Beacon Hills First National Bank. During captivity, she and Boyd had a heart-to-heart about them possibly becoming stronger during the lunar eclipse. Erica says she hopes it does, while looking at Kali with baleful eyes. Erica decides to fight, taking on Kali, but she dies from the fight in the process, reaching for Boyd, her only friend, whispering his name with her last breath. Isaac later reveals that he found them and also Erica's body when being captured and escaping. After Derek finds Erica's body, he mourns her death and carries it out of the bank. Derek sees the circumstances of her death through Boyd's memories as he absorbs Boyd's powers, which shatters him emotionally.
Ethan and Aiden	Charlie Carver and Max Carver; Cale Schultz (superwolf)	3, 5, 6	Werewolf
Ethan and Aiden were twin werewolves and former members of the Alpha Pack. The twins were originally members of a Pack of infamously brutal werewolves and their Alpha having been the worst. The twins were constantly mistreated, abused by all the others; Ethan admitted to them being something like "the bitches" of the Pack. After meeting Deucalion, he taught them how to harness a form where they could Merge. Once they mastered the skill they proceeded to eliminate each member of the pack, eventually both becoming Alpha werewolves themselves after killing their Alpha together. Out of fealty, and perhaps fear, they joined Deucalion's Alpha pack. Enrolling at Beacon Hills High in Season 3A, they repeatedly antagonize Isaac and Scott. Ethan is gay and begins pursuing Danny Mahealani, while Aiden begins a liaison with Lydia. Ethan and Aiden initially seduced Danny and Lydia respectively to try to get leverage and information on Scott and his allies, but Ethan's feelings for Danny eventually turn genuine. Aiden insists that his feelings for Lydia are fabricated, though they in fact run deeper than he would like to admit. Ethan's relationship with Danny softens the Alpha to the point where he meets Scott halfway in the episode "Currents" explaining he won't harm Danny, as he realizes that Danny isn't part of Scott's group but now knows that Lydia is. When the Alphas have Derek kill Boyd by hand as per Kali's order, Ethan shows guilt for his actions, which Scott catches onto. Having Lydia distract Aiden, Scott and Stiles confront Ethan for conformation concerning whether or not the Darach could have been an emissary to any one of them in "The Girl Who Knew Too Much". Ethan relays their story to them, explaining how they owe Deucalion and lets them know that Morrell, Deucalion's emissary, was the only emissary spared. Ethan betrays the Alpha Pack in the mid-Season 3 finale, "Lunar Ellipse", to help Derek and Cora escape from Kali, enlisting Lydia's help and Aiden is quick to join his brother turning on Kali when she threatens Lydia. Unexpectedly, this confrontation is interrupted by the arrival of Jennifer Blake, who is the Darach. The twins fight Jennifer in separate one-on-one duels, but ultimately decide to merge into their super-werewolf form when they are overpowered and Kali is killed. Still they prove unsuccessful, when Jennifer snaps their merged form's neck and appear dead. Minutes later, they demerge as individuals, barely alive. Fortunately, Lydia and Cora get them to Deaton, who helps save their lives. In Season 3B, they've lost their Alpha status and their talent to merge into their super-werewolf form in their feat to survive Jennifer's attack, so they disappear for a couple of weeks, with Ethan breaking up with Danny, though Lydia keeps in contact with Aiden. In "Galvanize", they say they need to join a new Pack as they are now Omegas and enemies will come for them because of their time with Deucalion. They come to ask Scott to join his Pack. Isaac and Stiles are vehemently against this and Scott says no as they don't trust them, particularly because of their part in Boyd's murder. Later, they decide to re-enroll in high school. Aiden continues his affair with Lydia but she eventually states that she helps to save lives, while all she sees is how he helped kill Boyd saying he is a 'bad guy' not just a 'bad boy'. Aiden shows genuine guilt for this. Ethan, meanwhile catches Danny making out with his ex-boyfriend and appears hurt. To make a fresh start and earn Scott's trust the twins help out with threats such as finding the serial killer William Barrow, combating the Oni, where they are both "tagged" by the said demons and helping out with the chaos caused by Stiles under the Nogitsune's possession. In the Season 3B finale, "The Divine Move" after events take a turn for the worse with Alison's death and the Nogitsune takes control of the Oni, the twins consider the idea to run. Derek scolds them and tells them they have to fight for Scott's cause of protecting people instead of fighting for Scott himself if they wish for redemption and become part of his pack. They assist Derek in fighting the Nogitsune and the Oni. After a prolonged altercation, they are saved by Argent, who begins to destroy the Oni with Allison's silver-tipped arrows. Aiden destroys an Oni with a silver arrowhead, only to be fatally stabbed himself. Bleeding heavily and dying, Aiden is held in Derek's arms while Ethan cries over him. Aiden tearfully states that Lydia will have a hard time thinking he became a 'good guy', but Derek reassures he will tell her himself. After passing away, Aiden's death is "felt" by Lydia, which deeply saddens her. With the loss of his brother, Ethan decides to leave Beacon Hills. Danny breaks up with him instead and reveals that he knows Ethan is a werewolf, which shocks the latter. He then gives Ethan a kiss goodbye. Ethan and Aiden had a talent to sense when the other is in pain and the power to physically merge their bodies into a single more powerful werewolf form. However, when Jennifer Blake killed their "super-wolf" form, their feat to survive as individuals cost them their Alpha status and that ability. Personality-wise, Ethan is calm, reserved, calculating, passive and shows remorse for his actions, as while Aiden was impulsive, aggressive, cocky, spontaneous and prone to violence. Both twins have a sense of honor as they followed Deucalion after he helped them fight back against their abusers in their original pack, and they both show guilt for their actions against Scott's fellowship.
Jennifer Blake	Haley Webb	3, 6	Druid
Jennifer Blake was the English teacher at Beacon Hills High School. Jennifer was the Darach. In "Tattoo", Jennifer starts her class with the last quote from Joseph Conrad's "Heart of Darkness". Suddenly, flocks of birds mysteriously come flying through the window and begin attacking the class. She is seen mildly distressed afterward. In "Fireflies", Jennifer is seen late at school grading papers, when she happens across a feral Boyd and Cora. She is saved by Derek who endures their attacks until the sun rises. Derek helps her up and she supposedly takes a liking to him. She sees Derek again in "Unleashed", where she says she'll say nothing about what she saw. Derek says he was going to see if she was okay and they connect. When Derek comes to her for help, after being wounded by Deucalion's Alpha pack, she takes him to his loft in "Motel California" and tries to help him heal. Jennifer and Derek connect again with him saying she shouldn't get involved with him, because everyone around him gets hurt, but she says she has been hurt before. They share a kiss and spend the night together, which helps Derek heal faster. When the Alphas attack his loft in "Currents", Kali has the twins hold her hostage as leverage against Derek and she witnesses Derek, in his Alpha werewolf form, and Kali fight. She is saved by Isaac but Kali has Derek kill Boyd. In the episode "The Girl Who Knew Too Much", Jennifer is taking a class and sees Lydia drawing a tree. Later, she organizes the recital to honor the dead. Sheriff Stilinski simultaneously uncovers an old case about a patient who was brought to Beacon Hills Memorial years ago, but birds, similarly to the events in "Tattoo" died that day with Stilinski realizing the birds were sacrificing themselves for the girl - who he figures out to actually be Jennifer. Jennifer is revealed to be the Darach, the dark druid responsible for the mass sacrifices in Beacon Hills, tries to kill Lydia and kidnaps Stilinski. Using mistletoe Scott and Stiles prove to Derek she is the Darach in "The Overlooked", by exposing her true form. Derek angrily attacks her, but she reveals she has poisoned his sister Cora with the same plant and only she can heal her. As the Alpha pack try to kill her, she shows her intense hatred for them. She reveals to Derek her first name was Julia Baccari and she was Kali's Emissary. She and Kali were close, but Kali had attempted to kill her, as part of killing her entire Pack in order to join the Alpha pack. She was able to survive because Kali couldn't bring herself to deliver the final blow. Julia then struggled to the Nemeton, which hadn't had power for a long time. But the sacrifice of a virgin months earlier had given the tree stump a spark of power again, which gave Julia the ability to survive just long enough until help arrived. Eventually, because Kali's attack had left Julia hideously disfigured, she used her talents to disguise herself with a new identity, 'Jennifer Blake'. She informs him of her plan to destroy Deucalion's Alpha Pack on the next full moon which is also a lunar eclipse because werewolves lose all their power during the eclipse. Derek affirms this. She also tells him the virgin sacrificed at the Nemeton that reignited its power was Paige Krasikeva, his first love when Derek mercy-killed her, explaining her felt connection towards him. In "Alpha Pact", Jennifer holds Stiles' father, along with Scott's mother and Allison's father for the final sacrifice, Guardians, as they are all Guardians of their children. The behavior of the animals throughout the season is later discovered to have been caused by Jennifer in response to her and her mass sacrifices. She is also discovered to be aligned with the telluric currents as she committed her sacrifices in line with them. She has holding the captive parents at the Nemeton, the same tree in Lydia's been consistently drawing which is why Jennifer tried to kill her. In "Lunar Ellipse", Jennifer appears at Derek's loft, breaking through the glass roof and takes on the Alpha Pack. She overpowers Kali and the twins. She angrily faces Kali, asking her what it takes for to look normal to spite Kali as she'd physically ruined her actual face. Jennifer demonstrates her power using telekinesis to have the glass shards rise and suspend. Kali stubbornly rages at her former friend and Jennifer ferociously rockets the glass shards into Kali's body, killing her former Alpha. The twins then take her on in their merged form but she snaps their neck inducing them into a coma. She uses Lydia to lure Derek back to his loft. She promises Derek the kidnapped parents if he will be her "Guardian", even after he informs her he is no longer an Alpha werewolf. Jennifer begins sacrificing the parents using the storm to bury them alive with her connection to the telluric currents. At the abandoned distillery outside of Beacon Hills, they face off against Deucalion who has Scott with him. Deucalion easily overpowers both of them, but, to buy more time, Scott blinds the "Demon Wolf" long enough for the lunar eclipse to arrive and the werewolves are rendered powerless. Jennifer assumes her true form and thrashes Deucalion. Derek convinces her to heal his blindness so he can see the results of his actions on her with the intent of him repenting her. However, this leaves Jennifer weakened as Derek had intended. Enraged, Jennifer repeatedly assaults Derek, but he endures her attacks just long enough for the lunar eclipse to pass. The lunar eclipse passes, but Jennifer protects herself with a mountain ash barrier, now fully intent on sacrificing the parents. To save them, Scott determinedly pushes through her barrier and eventually breaks it becoming a True Alpha. Scott says he'll kill her himself if she does not stop the storm, but Deucalion does it mortally wounding her. Jennifer survived Deucalion's slash to the throat, and was hoping the Nemeton would restore her health once more only to be stopped by Peter Hale. After revealing she knows all about his plan (killing Scott to steal his new Alpha status), Peter slashes her throat himself, killing her for good. Jennifer was highly intelligent, specializing in literature and mythology, as expected of a druid Emissary. She had an intense hatred for Deucalion's Alpha pack, specifically Kali as she was friends with her and Kali tried to kill her and she stopped at nothing to get revenge on them, to the point of sacrificing innocent people. As the Darach, Jennifer was amongst the most powerful beings seen in the series because of her mass druid sacrifices. By massacring Warriors, she gained enhanced strength, Healers for healing abilities so great she healed Deucalion's eyesight, Philosophers for intelligence and strategy, and Virgins, to seduce people easily for her agenda as with Derek. She could use telekinesis, a form of mind control to have a pianist killed by a split random cord off the piano to slit her throat for her final Philosopher sacrifice, she could appear somewhere else partially or teleport completely as seen when Lydia saw her materialize in a blaze in "Motel California" and when she abducted victims. Overall, her most impressive ability was glamoring herself to hide in plain sight so efficiently she settled into her "Jennifer Blake" persona for the majority of the time fooling many people she was a harmless, innocent woman.
Cora Hale	Adelaide Kane	3	Werewolf
Cora Hale is Laura and Derek's younger sister and also a born werewolf. She unknowingly survived the Hale House fire and was apparently unaware her siblings Laura and Derek were away at school at the time. Cora was long believed by Derek and Laura to be dead. After the fire, Cora ventured to South America where she lived during the intervening years. She believed her entire family was dead, but she came into town after hearing rumors an Alpha werewolf was building a Pack back in Beacon Hills, California, "one of the Hales". After Boyd and Erica were captured by the Alpha Pack, Cora was captured also and learned her brother Derek was alive. All three were held captive in the abandoned Beacon Hills First National Bank. During this period, Erica tried to fight back, but was killed by the Alpha werewolf Kali. Cora became friends with Boyd during their imprisonment, but the hecatolite lined in the bank vault refracted the moonlight, refraining the two werewolves from fully transforming during the full moons, causing their rage and bloodlust to build up inside. Three months later, upon being found by Derek and Scott, Cora and Boyd lost all control of their animal sides and escaped into the woods to kill. They were later subdued by Derek, with assistance from Scott, Isaac and Argent. Eventually the sun rises and she and Boyd are rescued and Cora is reunited with her brother joining his Pack. Cora is impulsive, trigger-happy, short tempered, vengeful and tomboyish but she cares for those close to her. Like her older brother Derek, she gives death threats to people; of course, like her older brother, she has no intention of going through with them. In "Currents", when Deaton is kidnapped to be sacrificed by the Darach, Cora helps Scott's friends to find him deducing that Deaton is being held in the same bank she was locked in for three months, but she learns the Alphas have attacked Derek's loft and sabotaged the trap for them. Cora leaves with Stiles and Lydia to help her brother. After Boyd is killed by the Alphas, she breaks down in tears and cradles her close friend's body. Cora tries to avenge his death by killing Aiden, but fails to do so and is knocked out when Aiden strikes her in the head with a weight. She is saved by Scott and Ethan when they restrain Aiden. Her wound from the blow to her head Aiden gave her suddenly does not heal, she falls unconscious and is put in the hospital. She was later revealed to have also been poisoned by Jennifer with mistletoe for leverage against Derek. Derek saves her life by giving up his Alpha werewolf status using his pain transference to heal her. In the mid-season 3 finale, Cora helps Lydia and Deaton save the lives of Aiden and Ethan after their defection from the Alpha Pack. She later leaves Beacon Hills with Derek for her former residence in South America. During Season 3B, Cora goes into hiding at Derek's request, remaining in South America as he undertakes a mission to retrieve their mother Talia's claws from the Calavera hunters and they separate.
Braeden	Meagan Tandy	3, 4, 5	Human
Braeden is a US Marshall-turned-mercenary, an ally of Scott's Pack and Derek's girlfriend in Season 4. Braeden saves Isaac from the Alpha Pack, in the Season 3 premiere, "Tattoo". Later, fleeing the Alphas, Braeden heads to the high school, looking for Scott, who she calls 'the Alpha'. She comes up to Allison and Lydia asking for Scott. Unfortunately the twins spot her. She bruises the two girls' arms. The Alphas corner her and she manages to put up a good fight against the Pack, but is ultimately knocked down after sustaining wounds from them. Braeden lets Deucalion know she knows he is afraid of Scott, of 'the man he'll become'. The Alpha pack leader informs her he is aware Scott's a potential threat, but he intends to place Derek and Scott against each other to eliminate "the threat" and slashes Braeden. Braden's actions are revealed in the episodes "Chaos Rising", that the bruises she left on Allison and Lydia form the logo for the abandoned Beacon Hills First National Bank where the Alpha pack is holding Boyd and Cora hostage and "Currents", that her words regarding Scott was that he had the potential to be a True Alpha and was intending to warn him about the Alpha Pack and Deucalion's plan for him. Her identity remained unknown until "Alpha Pact" when the Alpha Pack confront Marin Morrell that she sent her in a move against them. Morrell reveals she sent Braeden to rescue Isaac from the Alphas, to ensure balance. In "More Bad Than Good", it is discovered Braeden is actually alive, but scarred on her face and neck from Deucalion's claws. She rescues Derek and Peter from the Calavera werewolf hunters and helps them retrieve the triskele urn in the hunters' possession. She reveals she was hired by Deucalion to save them. While Braeden is shown to be fearless, spontaneous and altruistic, it is explained she is a mercenary for hire, taking dangerous jobs from anyone who can pay her, regardless of her client's intentions or identity, or the moral compunctions of her missions. Braeden appears in "The Dark Moon" in Season 4, being provided by Araya Calavera as a guide to Scott's Pack during their mission in Mexico to find Derek. She has taken a contract from the Calaveras to find Kate, capture her and return her to them. Scott asks her if she'd kill Kate if paid enough. She replies if paid enough, she'd kill Scott himself. In "Muted", Braeden arrives in Beacon Hills in her US Marshall pose, where Derek hires her to find Kate for him first so he may learn what Kate did to him, causing his werewolf eye color to return to gold. While she accepts, the two develop an attraction to each other. Braeden is found wounded, shot by an assassin, in the Preserve at Lookout Point by Derek where he was trying to track down the Pack led by the Alpha Satomi. He brings her to the hospital where she informs Derek and Melissa that the dead werewolves she found were infected by a virus lethal to supernaturals. She catches Derek watching over her, he claims to be "protecting his investment." Recovering in "Time of Death", Braeden crashes at Derek's loft, continuing their interest in one another. When Derek reveals he is gradually losing his power, Braeden takes Derek under her wing to teach him how to fight supernaturals as a human, beginning with firearms. They wind up sleeping with each other, starting a relationship. In "Perishable", Braeden interrogates the incarcerated Haige after he tried to assassinate Parrish. She learns of the plan to assassinate Scott's Pack at the school bonfire. With her lessons for Derek in hand-to-hand combat and firearms paying off, both are able to fight off the assassins both at the school, saving Scott, Malia and Liam's lives, and at the Argent Arms International warehouse when protecting Satomi's Pack. In the Season 4 finale, Braeden and Derek gear up to hunt down Kate in Mexico after she abducts Scott and Kira. Braeden tells Derek she is not accepting that Derek may not come back alive after he confides in her, sharing a sweet kiss with him. At La Iglesia, Braeden fights off Kate and a Berserker. She is saddened when Derek supposedly dies, though she keeps on fighting. She is elated when he is actually alive from the process of evolving. At the end of Season 4, Braeden tells Derek her employment as a US Marshall ended after she'd spent her entire career tracking a single target: the Desert Wolf. The two of them leave Beacon Hills afterwards. In Season 5, Braeden keeps in touch with Scott's Pack sending them intel she finds on the Desert Wolf. In "Status Asthmaticus", Braeden returns to Beacon Hills, helping Malia fend off a Chimera. She has been in contact with Malia, in on her plan to kill the Desert Wolf. Braeden informs Malia that the Desert Wolf is coming to Beacon Hills for her. In Season 5B, the two begin tracking associates of the assassin. They find an informant bribing him for information. They learn the Desert Wolf has a hostage -Deaton. In "The Sword and the Spirit", Malia and Braeden prepare to rescue Deaton who is being held in an abandoned building in the industrial estate. Braeden is untrusting of the treacherous Theo pointing out the Chimera had almost killed Scott. Malia pushes for Theo to come along as they have to capture the Desert Wolf worried for Deaton. Braeden warns Malia they are walking in with so much uncertainty. Theo asks why would a werecoyote use guns. Braeden tells a story that somehow the Desert Wolf lost part of her power that she is not as strong, fast nor heals as quickly as she once did, but warns Malia she has a perfect shot. After Theo leads the two into a trap with the assassin - Corrine - Malia and Braeden escape with Deaton when the Beast arrives at the scene. Braeden remains in Beacon Hills for the full moon to guard Malia as the Desert Wolf will come to kill Malia to regain her lost power. She assists in fighting the Beast of Gévaudan. In "The Beast of Beacon Hills", Malia and Braeden once again fall into a face-off with Corrine at the McCall house. Corrine outmaneuvers them and in the resulting firefight, Braeden is wounded and Stiles winds up in the skirmish. Corrine makes her move to kill Malia, but she is defeated by Malia, thanks to Stiles' actions, draining the ruthless werecoyote of her remaining power. Braeden staggers into the house and knocks Corrine unconscious finally capturing the Desert Wolf.
Deucalion	Gideon Emery	3, 5, 6	Werewolf
Deucalion is an Alpha werewolf, formerly the Alpha Pack leader. In the past, Deucalion was the leader of his Pack and his Emissary was Marin Morrell. Deucalion had come to Beacon Hills for a meeting to discuss the threat of the Argent werewolf-hunter family. Fellow Alpha Ennis wanted help to combat the Argents because they had killed one of his Beta werewolves. Deucalion reasoned saying they killed his Beta because he killed two of theirs. Ennis declared revenge, anyway. Deucalion wanted to avoid bloodshed to make peace with the Argents. He met with Alpha werewolf Talia Hale and her Emissary, Deaton, to seek their advice before meeting with Gerard Argent. He and three of his Betas were instead tricked and ambushed by Gerard, who not only killed Deucalion's Betas, but his men who wished for peace with the Packs. He later blinded Deucalion in an unsuccessful attempt to kill him. With the help of Deaton, Deucalion's eyes healed physically, but his sight did not return. This discovery coupled with Gerard's betrayal enraged Deucalion. Marco, another of his beta werewolves, took this opportunity to try and kill Deucalion to become the Alpha of their pack. Deucalion, however, realized he could see using his werewolf vision and savagely killed Marco in retaliation. In doing so he realized Alphas became stronger when they kill their own Betas. The entire experience corrupted Deucalion. Eventually, he killed the rest of his pack to add all of their powers to his own and lead fellow Alphas Kali and Ennis to do the same. Sometime after, he came across the twins (Aiden and Ethan) who were "the bitches" in a brutal Pack. Deucalion taught them how to control their merged form to fight back against their abusers and they joined him after killing their original Alpha. He pulled all five of them together to form an Alpha pack. He even had all the members kill their Emissaries, except for Marin, his own. Deucalion eventually came to be known as "the Demon Wolf". Deucalion's Alpha Pack arrived in Beacon Hills in the Season 2 finale, capturing Boyd and Erica in the process. In "Unleashed", Deucalion goes to Derek's loft along with Kali and Ennis to offer Derek a proposition for Derek to kill his own Pack to join his own with the intention of recruiting him. Deucalion's actual plan for Derek was to place him against Scott. To this end, after the battle between the Packs in "Frayed", Deucalion kills Ennis after he fails to heal himself, absorbing Ennis' power; he lies to Kali and the twins that Ennis died of his wounds, intending to have a vengeful, distraught Kali force Derek's decision to join the Alpha Pack. In "Currents", the reason for this is because Deucalion knows that Scott has the potential to become a True Alpha and wants to recruit Scott, not Derek. Deucalion's true intentions throughout Season 3 were to push Scott into a position to either join the Alpha Pack or have Scott kill somebody, destroying his True Alpha potential and eliminating Scott as a potential threat to him. He had Ethan and Aiden enroll in high school to seduce people close to Scott for leverage. When the new killer committing human sacrifices is revealed to be a Darach, Deucalion had his pack hunt it down. He targets the Darach because it used to be a druid who can call upon powers from sacrifices. After finding out that the Darach is Jennifer, Kali's old emissary, the Alpha Pack leader tried to have her killed. Scott later tearfully joins Deucalion's pack in "The Overlooked" in return for Deucalion's offer to help look for his kidnapped mother. In "Alpha Pact", he tries to have Marin killed when he suspects her to have had a role with the human sacrifices and she confirms to have had been working against him to "maintain balance", but Scott ultimately saves her. In "Lunar Ellipse", Deucalion and Scott face off against Jennifer and Derek (who Jennifer forced into helping him). Deucalion shifts into his Demon Wolf persona and overpowers both of them easily. He then tries to force Scott into killing Jennifer to become an Alpha, but Scott blinds him using flash bolts as he can see as a wolf. During the lunar eclipse, Deucalion temporarily loses his powers and Jennifer is to be able to defeat him. After being beaten to a pulp, Jennifer is tricked by Derek into healing Deucalion's normal eyesight to allow him to see her face and the result of his crimes on her but Jennifer is weakened because of this. After the lunar eclipse passes, Deucalion is in awe as Scott awakens his True Alpha abilities, breaking through Jennifer's mountain ash barrier. Deucalion saves Scott from becoming a killer by mortally wounding Jennifer, slashing her throat, subsequently stopping her from sacrificing the kidnapped parents. Because of this, Derek and Scott decide to let Deucalion go, hoping he can be the man he once was before. They warn him, if he commits something they don't like, he'll never see them coming. In Season 3B episode, "More Bad than Good", Braeden reveals Deucalion had hired her to rescue Derek from the Calavera werewolf hunters. In Season 5, "The Sword and the Spirit", Deucalion has been tracked down and is held hostage by Theo's Chimera Pack after some strife and pain on their part. Deucalion is blind again saying Jennifer's magically healing his eyesight was only temporary. The Alpha tells Theo he is aware of the Beast of Gévaudan which has been resurrected by the Dread Doctors and that Theo wants the werewolf to show him how to steal its power. In exchange, Deucalion says that he only wants Scott's eyes "on the tips of (his) claws". In "Amplification", Hayden is assigned to watch over Deucalion. The Alpha offhandedly lets her know Theo plans on siphoning the Beast's power using the garuda talons, but Theo's own Chimera frequency would reject the talons then kill him. He also gives her subtle advice on where her loyalties lie referring to the skirmish between Scott and Theo's Packs, giving her the resolve to leave Theo so she can be with Liam. In "The Beast of Beacon Hills", Deucalion proposes that a ruffled Theo trust him while revealing he'd has been playing them all along in that he'd let them take him hostage. Deucalion tells Theo the secret to stealing power is to "take their pain, take their life, take their power" which leads to Theo murdering Josh to siphon the latter's power to use the Dread Doctor mask to identify the Beast. He encourages Theo to align with Scott, saying he can't get to the Beast's host – Mason – without Scott's connection. In "Apotheosis", Deucalion is betrayed by Theo after the latter tests his newfound Chimera abilities on him. It is then revealed that Deucalion allied himself with Scott all along to double cross Theo and had lied to Theo about being both blind again (using a mastery over his werewolf body to disguise his eyes), wanting to get back at Scott, and that Belasko's talons could've worked to siphon the Beast's power. Deucalion blinks with purpose and his natural eye colour is back. He then breaks Theo's neck. Deucalion presumably then leaves after Gerard is disabled by Argent, the Beast is killed and Theo is banished to the underworld. Originally, Deucalion was described as a "man of vision" in the past, a level-headed, rational person as an Alpha, the leader of his Pack with a belief and faith in humanity. He was changed by Gerard Argent's treachery, the loss of his sight and his subsuming the powers of his Pack members by killing them. As the Alpha Pack leader, Deucalion is obsessive, vain, charismatic, power-hungry, willing to kill anyone who gets in his way, not above killing members of his own if they are useless to him. By Season 5, Deucalion reforms, having helped Scott and his Pack against Theo and the Beast. As the Alpha Pack leader, Deucalion possessed abilities greater than that of an average Alpha werewolf; he was able to command a Pack of exceptionally powerful Alphas with both fear and respect. Unlike most werewolves, in his transformed state, Deucalion's skin turns dark blue/grey and his facial features appears more demonic than wolf-like.
Kali	Felisha Terrell	3	Werewolf
Kali was an Alpha werewolf and a member of Deucalion's Alpha Pack. Kali was one of the most dangerous werewolves and used the claws on her feet to fight in a martial arts form of combat. Kali was Deucalion's right hand in his Alpha pack, though Deucalion mentioned later, she joined so she could be with Ennis, hinting she and Ennis were involved with each other. Kali was ruthless, arrogant, sadistic, cowardly and had no remorse for her actions; like Deucalion and Ennis, Kali murdered her entire Pack to add all their power to hers, which she states felt "liberating" and she was responsible for the death of Erica. After their pack's battle with Derek's Pack, Kali is shown to be worried over Ennis' condition from his fight with Derek. With Aiden and Morrell's help, they get Ennis to Deaton's clinic for treatment. She is devastated when Deucalion reports that Ennis has died from his wounds (in truth Deaton had actually saved Ennis, but Deucalion killed him to entice Kali into coming for Derek to further his plans for Derek and Scott). Kali eventually fought Derek one-on-one at his loft, having Ethan and Aiden hold Derek's girlfriend Jennifer Blake hostage and disabling the trap Boyd had set with the electrified water. During the fight, Kali gets a hold of Boyd and has Derek inadvertently kill him so to have him absorb Boyd's powers with an ultimatum: Derek has to join their pack by the full moon or she would kill him and all of his pack in repentance for Ennis' death. In the episode "The Overlooked", when the Alpha pack began hunting the Darach which is actually Jennifer, it is revealed she is really Julia Baccari, Kali's former Emissary. When Deucalion confronted her, Kali admitted she'd attempted to kill Julia, as part of killing her entire Pack in order to join the Alpha Pack, but she'd loved Julia and was unable to do it in the end and left her to die. Kali felt genuine remorse for this. The Alphas attempted to kill Jennifer, but were foiled by Scott and his allies. In the mid-season finale, she and Aiden show up at Derek's loft to kill Derek, only to have their plans foiled by Ethan - who betrayed them. Kali demands to know where Derek is. Aiden is quick to join his brother after she threatens Lydia. Kali confronts Aiden over his loyalties when he becomes violent in his supposed defection. However, this turn of events is interrupted by Jennifer, who breaks into the loft through the glass roof. Kali takes her on, but is overpowered. Jennifer confronts Kali about her new glamoured form, asking her what it takes to be able to look normal to spite Kali as the malicious Alpha had ruined her real face when she'd attempted to kill her. Kali fires back saying she does not care, but Jennifer responds saying "it takes power. Power like this", and uses telekinesis to levitate shards of the broken glass off the floor. Kali shows fear at this display, but ultimately refused to back down in arrogance and screams she "should've ripped (Julia's) head off", and Jennifer rockets the glass shards into Kali's body, violently killing her.
Ennis	Brian Patrick Wade	3	Werewolf
Ennis was an Alpha werewolf and part of Deucalion's Alpha Pack. In the past, one of Ennis' Pack members accidentally killed two werewolf hunters and was killed in retaliation. This enraged and saddened Ennis because he considered the Beta werewolf to be family to him. This caused him to seek out a new member for his Pack. He also came to Beacon Hills to seek out help combating the Argents meeting with delegations from other Packs including Deucalion, Kali and Talia Hale. He was advised against it, but he declared revenge anyway igniting the conflict between the packs and the Argents that persisted to the present. After being sought out and asked by Peter Hale, Ennis Bit Derek's girlfriend Paige. His intention was to be on good terms with Talia and to give his Pack a new member. After changing his mind Derek tried to save Paige, but Ennis had already bitten her. However, the Bite did not take effect, her body rejecting the transformation, and Derek later killed her to end her suffering. Sometime after that, Ennis killed his Emissary and his remaining Pack members to absorb their powers following Deucalion's lead, along with Kali, and later on, with Ethan and Aiden, forming the Alpha Pack. In the Season 3 premiere, "Tattoo" Ennis first appears disguised as a hospital orderly and tried to kidnap Isaac at the hospital, only to be stopped by Derek and Scott. After breaking into Derek's loft, Ennis easily subdued Cora while Deucalion explained his proposition to Derek about joining their pack. During the Alpha pack's battle against Derek's pack in "Frayed", Ennis was severely injured by Derek and Scott, which caused Kali and Aiden, along with their Emissary, Marin Morrell, to seek out Deaton for help. Deaton saves his life, but Deucalion kills Ennis to absorb his powers after he couldn't heal himself. The Alpha pack leader lies to Kali and the twins that Ennis had actually died from his fight with Derek. The Alpha pack declares that Derek must now either be killed or he is to join their Pack in repentance for Ennis' death, as per their rules. Marin tries to let the Alphas know Deucalion had actually killed Ennis intending to have Kali force Derek's decision to further Deucalion's plans for Derek and Scott, but he states she is lying and Kali came for Derek anyway. Ennis was the biggest member of the Alpha pack and a force of pure brutality. His brute strength and fighting knowledge made him a deadly adversary in a fight. He was arrogant, brutal and made rather zealous, amoral actions as an Alpha werewolf, declaring revenge on the Argents for their killing his dangerous Beta and Biting Paige. He was also quite murderous, killing his entire Pack and Emissary to absorb all their power. It is shown that he and Kali were involved with each other and that he followed Deucalion which is why Kali joined, according to Deucalion.
Rafael McCall	Matthew Del Negro	3, 4, 6	Human
Rafael McCall is an FBI agent, Scott's father, and Melissa's ex-husband. Rafael arrives in the episode "Alpha Pact" of Season 3, investigating the murders by the Darach. While it was implied now and then (via Melissa's response to Adrian Harris' question regarding Scott's relationship with his father in Season 1, her asking Scott if his actions are in relation to his father during Season 2, as well as Stiles' negative reaction to the sight and questions of him during season 3) that Rafael is a jerk and deadbeat, he is shown sitting in Scott's room with teary eyes, implying that whatever his flaws, Rafael cares about his son. In the mid-Season 3 finale, Rafael insensitively reunites with Scott at Allison's house. He is seen trying to reconcile with Scott to no avail, which Melissa finds amusing. During Season 3B, Rafael begins having Sheriff Stilinski's cases forwarded to him. As many of these are unclosed and unresolved (due to the Sheriff's new found knowledge of the supernatural), and inspecting Stilinski's reopening of the Malia Tate case, he starts to have Stilinski impeached, which would have him fired, much to Scott and Melissa's anger. Stiles coldly lets Rafael know that his attitude towards his father is because of something else rather than his "professional disapproval" of Stilinski, something Rafael does not like Stilinski knowing and Stiles says he knows what it is. When Stiles goes missing while sleepwalking in "Riddled", Rafael picks up on a line from Stiles' phone message to Scott and correctly deduces Stiles is sleepwalking, had called Scott while still asleep and is unknowingly at the werecoyote's den. Stilinski puts aside his differences with Rafael when he finds Stiles and brings him to the hospital, shaking his hand. When Stilinski faces the impeachment case in "De-Void", Rafael helps to talk him out of the case, revealing to him the real reason he came was to have an excuse to stay so he could talk to Scott. In "Insatiable", Rafael reveals to Scott why he left. He used to drink heavily back when he and Melissa were still married. One time, Rafael had come home drunk and was holding Scott when Scott was little. He'd got into a fight with Melissa, but he'd caused Scott to fall down the stairs, bruising his head on the floor which led to Melissa screaming at him to get out. Rafael left the family the next day, divorced Melissa and never took another drink again. Rafael later learned Melissa had confided in Stilinski over his drinking over the phone; Stiles had overheard the conversation and Rafael became spiteful toward Stilinski due to his alcoholism when his wife Claudia died. Scott isn't satisfied with his explanation, telling Rafael he used to "get hurt all the time" and that Rafael was never there for him. In "The Divine Move", Rafael talks to Melissa, consider returning to San Francisco. Melissa snaps at him, telling him when she yelled at him to "get out" after the incident, she was telling 'a drunk to get out of the house', not telling a father to get out of his son's life. Rafael helps to save Melissa when the Oni attack the hospital, promising Melissa that he'll do his best to make things up to Scott. In Season 4, Rafael is staying at the McCall house, to repair things with Melissa and Scott because he is "keeping (his) promises this time." In "Orphaned", Rafael is able to identify the supposed freshmen Garrett and Violet that have been killing supernatural people in Beacon Hills as the assassins, 'the Orphans' from Violet's weapon, the thermal cut wire. Rafael and Stilinski oversee Violet's transport to a federal facility, but the transport is attacked by Kate Argent, though they survive. During the school's quarantine in "Weaponized", Rafael investigates the situation. He enters the school disguised as a CDC worker after receiving a call from Melissa about a cure for the virus which will save Scott and his friends. He comes upon the assassin 'the Chemist' about to execute Stiles. Rafael takes out his gun and kills 'the Chemist' to save Stiles. In "Time of Death", Rafael has to leave for San Francisco to report to his superiors about his shooting the assassin. Scott asks him has he killed before, he replies two other times and lets his son know it is not easy, taking a life. Scott gives him a hug, but the conversation causes Scott to subconsciously debate should he resort to killing his enemies in order to stop them. Before Rafael departs, he tells Scott he has noticed the strange behavior of Scott and his friends. Particularly how they handle the situations happening in Beacon Hills, that they're far too calm for the horrible things that keep happening to them. Rafael tells a nervous Scott he wants a talk with him that he wants "to be in the know" when he returns. He reappears in season 6 apparently fully caught up on Scott being a werewolf, though how this happened is never shown. He attempts to get the pack to leave town for their safety, but ultimately fails. Later he teams up with the sheriff and Parrish to fight various enemies. When faced with a group of hunters and sees Parish disarm them by heating up their weapons he asks Parrish to teach him how to do that.
Noshiko Yukimura	Tamlyn Tomita (present); Arden Cho (1943)	3, 4, 5, 6	Kitsune
Noshiko Yukimura is Kira's mother and Ken's wife. Noshiko is also a Kitsune of the type Celestial, and she is close to 900 years old. Despite her supernatural status, Noshiko is a caring, domesticated and helpful mother to Kira and happily married to Ken. She is a pragmatist, being stoic and forthcoming. Noshiko serves as Kira's mentor to harness her Kitsune powers, and due to her centuries' long life, occasionally a source of guidance and knowledge. Noshiko is first seen in "Galvanize" when Scott is invited over for a sushi dinner with the family after Scott and Kira develop an interest in each other. Noshiko tells Scott some of their family history. In "Riddled", Noshiko unintentionally displays talents similar to Kira's which Kira catches. Noshiko later appears at the hospital during the power surge. She faces off against the Nogitsune, who is possessing Stiles Stilinski, with two of the Oni by her side. She and the Nogitsune trade words letting him know she will be undeterred in eliminating the Dark Kitsune, even if his chosen host is an innocent. Later, Noshiko sees Kira manifest her Foxfire defusing a sabotaged electrical cable, subsequently leaving Kira all the more suspicious. In "Letharia Vulpina", Noshiko meets with Ken, where he hands her a fake book containing blades, unaware that Kira is spying on them. It is realized that Noshiko is who summoned the Oni to Beacon Hills. The blades she carries, represent her Kitsune Tails. By sacrificing a Tail, a respective Oni is summoned from the Nemeton, and she can command the demons. Noshiko is adamant that Stiles be killed to eliminate the Nogitsune. In "The Fox and the Wolf", Scott and Kira object to her saying they want to save Stiles instead and implore her to call off the Oni. Noshiko reveals her story to her daughter and Scott, that she is responsible for unleashing the Nogitsune, saying he "came from (her)". In 1943, Noshiko was living in a "relocation camp" called Camp Oak Creek under Executive Order 9066. Noshiko would subtly improve the lives of the interned Japanese Americans by stealing food and supplies, all the while engaged in a clandestine romance with a field medic, Corporal Rhys. During an outbreak of pneumonia, Noshiko and Rhys discovered that the camp's army medics were selling medical supplies on the black market, resulting in several deaths in the camp. Noshiko hastily told her fellow interns of her discovery, but this unintentionally incited a riot. Rhys had attempted to defuse the chaos but was set aflame by a cocktail from an intern, Satomi, who Noshiko realized too late was a Bitten werewolf, and he died in agony. Eventually the officers opened fire and innocents were put down. Noshiko was shot also, but survived with her body healing. She learned the entire incident was going to be covered up. Enraged the army medics were going to get away with mass murder, as well as distraught with Rhys' death. Out of injustice, Noshiko prayed for her ancestors to send a Nogitsune to punish those responsible for the massacre, intending for the Dark Kitsune to possess her, for her pain and misery to imbue him with power. But a Kitsune cannot be controlled. So being a trickster, the Nogitsune possessed Rhys' corpse instead. He proceeded to slaughter not only the officers, but the interns at Eichen House when the inhabitants relocated there. Realizing her great mistake, Noshiko eventually cornered the Nogitsune and, with some help from Satomi, slew him. Noshiko had buried the fly from the corpse which embodied the Nogitsune's very being underneath the Nemeton. The Yukimuras had relocated to Beacon Hills because the ritual Allison, Stiles and Scott undertook released the Kitsune from its prison. Later, Noshiko visits Rhys' grave in Eichen House's basement in "De-Void". It is revealed she had carved the kanji "self" into the board to signify that Rhys had died as himself, not as a monster when the Nogitsune possessed him. The Nogitsune corners her and he steals her last Kitsune Tail from her. In "Insatiable", Noshiko and the Oni arrive at Camp Oak Creek to slay the Nogitsune. She confronts Kira's protesting that she thinks he could be taken alive, saying that she tried to save Rhys seventy years ago, saying Stiles is gone. She admits that while she is indeed no longer the Fox because of the sacrifice of her Tails, her daughter is, but the Nogitsune is still her demon to bury. Unfortunately, the Void Kitsune, takes control of the Oni using her final Tail and he turns the demons against the group and Allison is killed. With the Oni taken from her control, Noshiko takes Stiles and Kira back to their home. The stakes having been raised, Kira asks her mom if the Nogitsune could be trapped again. Noshiko replies the Nemeton's power is what trapped the Void kitsune. At the end of Season 3B, the Nogitsune is imprisoned in the Hales' triskele urn, and Noshiko feels at rest now that her enemy has been put away. In Season 4, during the Dead Pool situation, in "Time of Death", Noshiko shows Kira how to use her Thunder Foxfire to incapacitate Scott into a vegetative as part of a plan to catch the Benefactor. She advises Scott he'll experience dreams and whether they're good or bad depends on him. When Melissa snaps, asking why they're letting their kids fight these fights, Noshiko advises her saying they'd be telling them to run and hide for the rest of their lives otherwise. In "Smoke and Mirrors", Kira hallucinates Noshiko in La Iglesia when she and Scott are abducted by Kate Argent, comforting her after Scott tried to kill her as a Berserker and teaching her how to trigger a Kitsune's healing, using pain from cutting herself using a piece of obsidian. Back in Beacon Hills, Noshiko presents Kira with the obsidian piece shaped into a shuriken. Kira figures out the shuriken represents her first Kitsune Tail with her mother smiling in pride. In Season 5, the Yukimuras return from a summer in New York and arrive back during a traffic jam on route 115. Noshiko and Ken tell Kira of a legend for a similar storm; the Wild Hunt. In "Strange Frequencies", Noshiko engages Kira in a surprise spar, during which Noshiko speaks out in Japanese to Kira, saying "Show yourself, Kitsune!" Kira promptly flies into a rage, her Fox aura taking control of her. Kira moves in to kill her mom, but Ken snaps Kira out of her rage using her shuriken Kitsune Tail. Her worries confirmed, Noshiko informs a horrified Kira her Fox spirit is vying for control. At home, Noshiko attempts to help her daughter regain control of her power using acupuncture. Unfortunately, she and Ken later see that Kira has involuntarily escaped into the night, and then that Kira's sword was found embedded in a deceased Chimera. Noshiko, enlightened, helps a frustrated Kira to read Valack's coded novel which uncovers suppressed memories. The elder kitsune advises Kira she can't read the novel because the story is confusing her Fox spirit. To solve this issue, Kira should read the book, but without following the story: read the book backwards. Kira succeeds, remembering the Dread Doctors experimented on her the night of the traffic jam. Kira and Noshiko leave Beacon Hills for answers so to tame her daughter's Fox spirit. In Season 5B, "Codominance" Noshiko and Kira are in Shiprock, New Mexico. They track down a trio of skinwalkers. Noshiko tells Kira they may have a solution for taming her Fox spirit if she passes their test, but the alternative would be Kira staying with them and become a skinwalker herself. Kira is appalled at her mother for even considering the option. Noshiko placates her daughter, saying if the Fox becomes too powerful it will consume Kira and there'll be nothing of her left, but if she becomes a skinwalker her daughter would be kept alive. Kira despondently asks her mom would she really leave her there. Noshiko is conflicted after this. After Kira destroys the Oni manifestation as the test, but the shifters declare Kira must stay with them, Noshiko changes her mind. The elder kitsune firmly tells the skinwalkers if they want her daughter "they'll have to go through (her)". Scott and Stiles arrive at that moment and help them escape. Noshiko is surprised but smiles upon hearing Kira tell Scott she loves him. In season 6A "Ghosted", Noshiko was entrusted with Kira's sword, but she agrees to allow Liam to use it. However, this is not to be mistaken for Noshiko approving of Liam's plan. She tells Liam and Hayden that the Wild Hunt have been riding the storm and collecting souls since long before she was born. Before she leaves, Noshiko lets Liam know that he is responsible for whatever happens.
Ken Yukimura	Tom T. Choi	3, 4, 5	Human
Ken Yukimura is Kira's father, the husband of Noshiko, a talented weapons smith, and the new history teacher at Beacon Hills High School in Season 3B. Ken is a loving and endearing, if slightly oblivious, husband and father. Despite his jolly disposition, Ken is level-headed, demonstrates bravery and resourcefulness whilst dealing with the supernatural, aware his wife and daughter are both Kitsunes, doing his best to support both of them in times of need. At school in Season 3 "Anchors, Ken regularly unintentionally embarrasses Kira by trying to help her make friends. He spills the fact that Kira has a crush on Scott, right in front of Scott himself. He attempts to help, culminating in inviting Scott over for a sushi dinner with their family in "Galvanize". He and Noshiko tell Scott some of their family history. In spite of his name, Ken is Korean, having married Noshiko in Japan, but taking her last name, as Japanese law requires that the couple must take the same last name to belong to the same Koseki (family registry). Ken affirms to Scott he was proud to join his wife's family, given her family's long and storied history which is famous in Japan. In "Riddled", Allison and Isaac come to him for help in translating a strange Japanese voicemails on Allison's phone from a mysterious unknown caller. He says the voice is instructing Japanese-Americans at an American internment camp named Camp Oak Creek during WWII. He tells them the message is fake as he says no such camp existed in California. In "Letharia Vulpina", it is revealed Ken is supernaturally aware, and Noshiko is a kitsune. During the bomb scare at the school, Ken meets with Noshiko discreetly. Ken hands Noshiko her Kitsune Tails, concealed in a fake book. He implores his wife to talk with Kira, after what happened at the hospital. In "The Fox and the Wolf", the Nogitsune, inhabiting Stiles' body, enters Ken's classroom, looking for Noshiko's Tails. The Dark kitsune infects Ken with one of its flies to possess him to have him reveal where the Tails are. He is saved by Noshiko using a remedy brought to them by Kira and Scott, to expel the fly. When Noshiko reveals her story concerning the Nogitsune, Ken admits he lied to Isaac and Allison about Camp Oak Creek existing because of the Argent family's history of violence, unsure if he could trust Allison. Ken reveals he'd met Noshiko during his time in grad school when he'd searched for the confirmation of Camp Oak Creek's existence. He convinces his wife to share details with Scott, not just with Kira, saying allies should be welcome in times of war. Scott confronts Ken over his supporting Noshiko's demand that Stiles be killed to destroy the Nogitsune. Ken placates the young Alpha, saying that Stiles is gone and because of the bloodbath caused by the Nogitsune in 1943, he says sometimes "history does repeat itself" and life can conspire against people. In "Insatiable", when Kira is stressing about recent events and the secrets she has learned, Ken comforts and advises his daughter, saying as a Kitsune, she has a lot to learn, specifically the game of Go in order to combat the Nogitsune, known as Baduk in his native Korea. In the Season 3 finale, when Kira and Stiles take refuge at their home, Kira asks what their move is now that Nogitsune has split from Stiles' body and has taken control of the Oni. Ken says that at this point, to turn the game around against the Dark Kitsune, they need a divine move. After the Nogitsune is imprisoned, Ken and Noshiko correspondingly put away the Go pieces, as "the game" has been won. In Season 4, Ken remains on the school staff as the History teacher. In "I.E.D.", Ken confronts Kira, asking her if there was something she wanted tell he and Noshiko about. Kira promptly apologizes to him over not telling them about the Dead Pool and the assassins. Ken dumbfounded says he was talking about her joining the lacrosse team. He and Noshiko are let in on the situation when both Kira and Noshiko are revealed on the hit list. In "Weaponized", during another assassination attempt, Ken helps his daughter and the Pack locate a second entrance to the Hale Vault so they can hide when they lose control of their powers during the virus out break. In "Smoke and Mirrors", Ken has Kira's obsidian piece which she used to trigger her healing at La Iglesia reshaped as a shuriken as it represents Kira's first Kitsune Tail, similar to how Kaiken blades represented those of his wife. In the Season 5 premiere, after a summer in New York Ken has forged Kira a new katana blade that can be fashioned as a belt. He starts giving Malia driving lessons. In "Strange Frequencies" Ken volunteers Kira to help him with school supplies on a Saturday, though it is a ruse by him and Noshiko to lure Kira into an elaborate Kitsune training session. Kira's Fox spirit takes control of her, and she moves in to kill Noshiko. Ken snaps her out of her rage by embedding her shuriken Tail into his desk. Noshiko attempts to assist Kira in bringing the sway of her power back to her human side, but she and Ken see their daughter has left into the night, going into a fugue state. In "Ouroboros", when Kira's sword is found in the corpse of a Chimera girl and Kira is arrested, Ken confesses to the crime and that the sword is his to protect Kira. Ken is let go when the corpse is stolen. In Season 5 "The Sword and the Spirit", as another option to tame the Fox, Ken confiscates Kira's belt sword, reasoning that the sword works as a gateway to the Fox which is right now too dangerous. Ken advises Kira to instead use her mind as a weapon, to "outfox the Fox". To this end, Ken dismantles the mystical sword. In "The Beast of Beacon Hills", after her latest bout in losing control, Kira changes her mind, insisting she needs to help her friends. Ken relents, telling Kira her sword was forged with a unique power, and will need a certain similar power to re-forge it, giving Kira the motive to go back to the skinwalkers.
Jordan Parrish	Ryan Kelley	3, 4, 5, 6	Hellhound
Deputy Jordan Parrish is the new Deputy Sheriff to Stilinski at the sheriff's station starting in Season 3B, an ally of Scott's Pack and a supernatural creature, having been drawn to Beacon Hills by the Nemeton. Parrish has a sense of duty, and a friendly, loyal nature, being resourceful, intelligent and well-adjusted. Parrish is ex-military and served in Afghanistan, has a variety of skills including weaponry, electronics, hand-to-hand combat, and specifically explosives being a certified Hazardous Devices Technician (HDT). Parrish is revealed in Season 5 to be a hellhound. Parrish makes his first appearance when Stiles goes missing in "Riddled". In "Letharia Vulpina", Parrish operated on a suspected bomb disguised as a birthday present left on the school bus, to determine if it is a bomb. He manages to distract the student Jared, the one holding the potential explosive while he was opening it by chatting with Jared to take his mind off of the present situation. In "Insatiable", Stilinski tells Parrish he likes having him around and asks why he'd transfer. Parrish responds that he transferred to Beacon Hills because he felt drawn there, thinking he needed a change of space. In the Season 3 finale, Parrish and Stilinski are attacked at the Sheriff's station by the Oni, slashed by their blades, slowly killing them, but are cured when the Oni are destroyed. In Season 4 episode "Muted", Parrish investigates the Walcott family murder where he comes across Lydia, who is drawn to the site because of her banshee ability. Parrish lets her know of her reputation of being present at scenes where dead bodies turn up. He unwittingly asks her if she is psychic. Lydia scoffs at Parrish asking if he believes in things like that. Parrish replies he keeps an open mind. In "The Benefactor" Parrish, using his military background, helps Stilinski and Derek in analyzing the Mute's motorized keypad, uncovering the fact that the Mute is an assassin and disarming the claymore mine planted at the school. In "I.E.D." Parrish brings Meredith to the sheriff's station and later helps her recite numbers which are a clue to the second third of the Dead Pool. Lydia later sees his name on the list. She and Stiles show him the Dead Pool in "Orphaned". He asks them why would he be on the list which they deflect for the time being. In "Perishable", an assassination is attempted on Parrish. The culprit is his fellow deputy Haige. Haige soaks Parrish in gasoline and sets him on fire. His car and clothes burn, but his confirmed supernatural ability manifests: he survives, totally unharmed with no residual burns at all. Parrish walks into the station, and brutally attacks Haige, beating his would-be killer to a pulp. After the entire ordeal, Parrish is brought to Derek's loft by Lydia and meets with Scott and Derek. The three subsequently let Parrish in on the supernatural. He comes to grips with what they tell him, though they can't identify his species. Attempting to help with the Dead Pool situation, Parrish helps Lydia and Stiles with the list of names Lorraine Martin left Lydia. They were all supposedly suicides committed at Eichen House, but Parrish later notices each suicide was reported by the same person: Brunski. Parrish arrives at the institution just in time to save Stiles and Lydia from being murdered by Brunski, shooting him dead. Parrish, tracking Peter Hale in "A Promise to the Dead", arrives in the sewers and attempts to free Argent from being pegged to the wall. Parrish tells Argent he needs adrenaline, and he can get it using anger, and encourages the older man to use anger over what Allison would feel if Scott were in danger, and while pulling the rebar again, Parrish's supernatural nature triggers again, his eyes glowing with fire. In "Smoke and Mirrors", Parrish accompanies Argent to Mexico to rescue the Pack from Kate. At the conclusion of Season 4, Lydia gives Parrish a copy of the bestiary and offers him her help to find out what his supernatural identity is. During their investigation, Parrish tells her of a recurring dream he has been having. He is carrying a corpse through the woods to the Nemeton, where he is laying it down next to the tree stump. Parrish leaves out the fact that there are hundreds more bodies littering the clearing. In Season 5, "Condition Terminal", Parrish gives Lydia hand-to-hand lessons from his time in the Army at her request. When the Chimeras (genetic mutations of supernatural creatures produced by the Dread Doctors) appear, and as they're killed off, Parrish unconsciously goes into trances, his supernatural nature activating, where he steals the corpses and places them at the Nemeton, the scene in his dreams playing out. In one of his trances, Parrish flips over Stiles' jeep, and attacks fellow deputies guarding one of the corpses. Parrish's supernatural side also displays a telepathic connection with Lydia's banshee spirit. In "Lies of Omission", Parrish succeeds in consciously activating his powers by Lydia's intervention. Once he is told of his actions, he is horrified and tells Lydia the rest of the dream. To protect everyone around him, Parrish has himself incarcerated in a jail cell, telling Stilinski he is dangerous. In "Status Asthmaticus", Parrish's powers activate again and he easily escapes the cell to collect the remaining corpses. Lydia simultaneously uncovers his nature: a hellhound. In Season 5B, a newly enlightened Stilinski keeps Parrish on as a deputy, but as the Beast of Gévaudan is resurrected and brings a bloodbath to the town, Parrish grows increasingly concerned over the number of bodies piling up. In "The Sword and the Spirit", Parrish is visited by Argent and Gerard. Parrish tells them part of his time serving in Afghanistan. He was part of an EOD team removing improvised explosive devices. One bomb he was assigned went off on him close range: Parrish had walked away alive and unscathed. The Argents list all his supernatural activity and test his imperviousness to fire. They confirm, and reveal to Parrish his hellhound status. Parrish participates in the plan to break Lydia out of Eichen House. As the hellhound, his fire ability incinerates the mountain ash barrier allowing all of Scott's Pack to reach Lydia and shields them from her deadly amplified Scream. Scott's Pack discover that Parrish, as the hellhound during further fugue states, hunts and takes on the Beast during its killing spree. In "A Credible Threat", in an attempt to have Parrish understand his nature, to have a fighting chance against the Beast, Argent and Gerard use a cooling machine on Parrish to bring the hellhound to the surface. The Guardian of the supernatural awakens and communicates with Lydia: Parrish himself is an avatar for the hellhound to function, who was born by the Nemeton's power around the same time Scott, Stiles and Allison committed their sacrifice. Jordan Parrish himself had actually died when the IED back in Afghanistan exploded on him, but the hellhound took over, allowing him to live on. Jordan resurfaces, terrified, saying he has to leave Beacon Hills. In "The Beast of Beacon Hills", Parrish attempts to swiftly leave, but Lydia and the Sheriff intercept and attempt to dissuade him. Lydia informs Parrish she has been predicting death longer than him, that the premonitions don't always come true. She further urges him to consider what if the bodies he has seen in his dream are due to him not being there to protect them. Stilinski hands him his badge back. Discouraged from leaving, Lydia then takes Parrish to the Nemeton, the force that drew him to Beacon Hills. Parrish touches the tree stump. He attempts to, and eventually succeeds in consciously activating his abilities. He rushes to aid Scott's Pack and the Argents against the Beast with a renewed sense of confidence and determination. In "Apotheosis", Argent repays Parrish for saving his life from before by telling him the Beast isn't unstoppable that the prediction seen by whoever painted the fresco is taking place. Parrish takes up the fight with the Beast at spear-point. Once Lydia succeeds in freeing Mason from Sebastien's essence, Parrish restrains and holds down the Beast's shadow allowing Scott to finish off the Beast once and for all. In season 6A "Superposition", Parrish is approached by Corey and Mason who are under the impression that someone is missing but Parrish disagrees. Mason asks Parrish if his hellhound intuition is telling him that something may be off with the supernatural. Parrish replies that he senses death, not kidnappings. In "Sundowning", Parrish enters Scott's house with his gun drawn, demanding that the Ghost Rider stop when it refuses to comply. He fires several shots in its back, to no effect. In "Relics", Mason believes Parrish could be the key to stopping the Ghost Riders. When he is confronted by a Ghost Rider, Parrish goes into hellhound mode, his eyes glowing a fiery orange as the flames consume his body. The Ghost Rider fires a shot at him as he approaches, causing Parrish's flames to turn green as they burn out. In "Heartless", Parrish agrees to help the Pack communicate with a Ghost Rider known as the Outlaw. Plans change as the Outlaw forces Parrish to shift into his hellhound form. Attempting to burn the mountain ash barrier as he does so, but he is stopped by Scott and Liam. In "Blitzkrieg", Parrish is found to be in an unresponsive state inside the cooling chamber in the bunker. Garrett Douglas uses some kind of command to awaken the hellhound, however, Parrish's eyes glow green instead of the fiery orange. At Garrett's request, he opens up the rift. In "Riders on the Storm", Parrish is brought back to his senses by Scott, Stiles and Liam and he then reveals that while the train cannot be stopped, it can be diverted. After the Ghost Riders leave with Garrett, Parrish is back at the station with Sheriff Stilinski and the other deputies. A hellhound, Parrish is amongst the more powerful creatures to appear in the series. His natural power, pyrokinesis aside, his super-strength, speed and healing factor are unequaled, and is almost nigh invulnerable. When his hellhound abilities manifest, Parrish is engulfed in a nimbus of flames, embodies fire himself and his eyes also glow with fire. Parrish is a Guardian of the supernatural, who swiftly and steadfastly protects the supernatural world from discovery and disaster. The hellhound spirit within Parrish is immortal and has been named throughout mythology many times: Cerberus, Garmr and the Black Shuck.
Meredith Walker	Maya Eshet	3, 4, 5	Banshee
Meredith Walker is a banshee first appearing in Season 3 and a long term patient at Eichen House. Meredith is eccentric, shy, mentally and emotionally fragile. She has no living family, and her banshee symptoms most lead her to being institutionalized at the hospital. Nonetheless, Meredith display strong resolve and conviction, and is revealed to be the Benefactor during Season 4. After meeting Lydia, she offers the fellow banshee help in understanding her banshee talents. Meredith first appears in Season 3 episode "Echo House", when Stiles is checked in at the institution. Stiles comes up behind her when Meredith is concernedly talking into a disconnected, dead phone saying she should "tell them" and that "one of them is standing right behind (her)", which Stiles overhears. In "Insatiable", the Pack deduce Meredith is another banshee by comparing her symptoms to Lydia's. Meredith escapes and breaks into the school but is saved by the Pack before she is attacked and returned to the hospital by Brunski. Scott, Stiles and Isaac take her to Scott's house. They're hoping she can help them find Lydia. Meredith remembers Lydia as "the red-haired girl". Meredith recalls being able to communicate with a kidnapped Lydia over an immense distance. Meredith had received a message that Lydia does not want them to look for her. She listens to a phone, and says "Coup de Foudre". Scott translates her message as French for "Love at first sight", the phrase Noshiko Yukimura had taught her lover Corporal Rhys at Camp Oak Creek in 1943: Lydia is at Camp Oak Creek. Meredith is then presumably returned to Eichen House. In Season 4, Lydia and Malia decide they need help from Meredith in "I.E.D." to decode the rest of the Dead Pool. Meredith heads to the high school, but is brought to the sheriff's station by Parrish, saying she is looking for Lydia. Lydia and Malia arrive and they ask her about what she knows. Meredith is cryptic as always saying Lydia 'called her'. Parrish offers input that perhaps what she needs to tell Lydia may be a number to call. Meredith affirms this reciting the number 2-4-3-6. Lydia says a phone number is ten digits, but Meredith repeatedly insists that is the number. Malia and Lydia later figure out the number sequence spells out AIDEN on a telephone pad, cracking the second third . In "Orphaned", Lydia and Stiles pay Meredith a visit at Eichen House where they implore her to reveal the final cipher key. Meredith is shaking in fear saying things have changed, though she telling Lydia she wanted to help. Lydia asks Meredith why not help now. Meredith says 'the Benefactor' does not want her to tell them. They ask Meredith for his name, but eventually she lets out a banshee scream giving Lydia a bleeding ear. When Lydia decodes the final third of the Dead Pool, she sees Meredith's name and Lydia immediately has Parrish check on her. Unfortunately, Meredith had apparently committed suicide by hanging herself out of fear for her life. Her corpse is found by Brunski and Lydia and Stiles mourn her death. In "Weaponized", Lydia claims a box of Meredith's possessions and finds a photo of Meredith standing in the study of the Martins' lakehouse. Lydia learns about the history of her grandmother Lorraine Martin and that Meredith was one of her subjects brought in for her study of parapsychology; Meredith had put on headphones for a test. Her ears bled out causing her to be hospitalized for a year. In "Perishable", after Parrish saves Stiles and Lydia by killing Brunski, Meredith reveals herself to be alive. She had been using Brunski because she knew of his being a serial killer, and says, "(Brunski) wasn't on (her) list.": Meredith is revealed to have been the Benefactor all along. In "Monstrous", Meredith is brought to the sheriff's station. Lydia implores Meredith why would she launch the Dead Pool. Meredith tells Lydia she only wanted "to help" and that she'll only talk to Peter Hale. When Peter arrives, he repeatedly tells Meredith they have never met. Meredith says Peter does not remember her. Peter reacts to this, and performs a mind meld. Through Meredith's memories, it is revealed during her hospitalization from Lorraine's experiment, Meredith was placed next to Peter when he was comatose from the Hale Fire for months. The whole time, a catatonic Meredith could involuntarily hear Peter's thoughts telepathically: Peter was ranting due his trauma from the fire, raving over how he'd predicted the Argents would target his family. Meredith was terrorized by Peter's cognizant revenge-fueled thoughts that he would remake the supernatural population of Beacon Hills in his image instead of his sister Talia's. To do this, Peter said first he'd hire assassins to purge Beacon Hills of all supernaturals, placing them all on a hit list, "The Dead Pool". Peter was originally the one who planned the Dead Pool, though he did not remember; Meredith, using Lorraine's computer code to comprise the Dead Pool, put the list online. After Peter leaves, Lydia talks with Meredith afterward, showing her compassion for "someone who'd put their name on a hit list." Meredith justifies Peter's 'plan' in that the supernatural are monsters, even the banshees. She believed too many people had died at their hands, and that she decided "to help": she enacted the plan in response to her Hearing Lydia Scream as Allison died. Lydia tells Meredith "not all monsters do monstrous things", like Scott. Meredith touches Lydia's face and realizes, the latter is also an example. The vulnerable banshee tears up, showing remorse, lamenting "What have I done?" In Season 5, "Damnatio Memoriae", Meredith communicates with a catatonic Lydia during the latter's stint at Eichen House. Meredith tells Lydia she has to wake up if she wants to save her friends. Meredith reminds Lydia that she learned how to fight and promises to teach her the rest, how to use her voice as a weapon. Within their telepathic communication, Meredith instructs Lydia to use her hands to guide her voice, to push it towards the target. She traps Lydia in a cell to push her to break the glass. Lydia asks Meredith to tell her how she learned. Meredith immediately says Lydia has to find her own way. She caves in to Lydia's questions saying her way got people hurt. Meredith was at school in chemistry class. She was hearing people dying "everywhere", she started slamming the desk so hard and then Meredith Screamed. All the windows shattered, the glass reverberated throughout the classroom, embedding into people's arms, faces and their ears bled. The event was blamed on an explosion caused by chemicals, but people knew it was her. Meredith implores Lydia find "her own way" because her voice is like a bomb, she is too dangerous; Lydia has to make hers "a bullet." When Malia is close to being killed by the Desert Wolf, Meredith yells at Lydia to break the glass, successfully coaxing Lydia to find her voice and snap her out of her catatonia. When Scott's Pack breaks into Eichen House to rescue Lydia, Scott finds Meredith also catatonic. She is competent enough to direct Scott to communicate with her via a mind meld. She tells him that to penetrate the mountain ash barrier, to reach Lydia, they need the hellhound (Parrish).
Brunski	Aaron Hendry	3, 4	Human
L. Brunski was the head orderly at the mental institution Eichen House. Brunski is sadistic and snarky, taking great pleasure in harassing or manhandling his charges or other people given the chance. Brunski is first seen in "Echo House". When Stiles steals his key to the institution's basement, Brunski catches Stiles and has Stiles locked up in a separate quiet room and sedates him with Haldol with a comment, "I always love the sarcastic ones." Brunski is seen in "Insatiable", when Meredith Walker escapes Eichen House to find the gang at Beacon Hills High School. Brunski and two orderlies come to the school to return Meredith to the institution, where he talks down to Coach Finstock. Apparently, when Brunski was in high school, Finstock was classmates with him and he frequently bullied Bobby. He mocks Finstock over his teaching policy and Finstock is cowed by him. When Meredith is found in the music room, Brunski stalks her with a taser, but before he strikes, Finstock grabs the taser and shocks Brunski before he attacks the banshee, saying the school has a strict policy against bullying, and again when Brunski curses him. In Season 4, Brunski appears in "Orphaned" where he hassles Parrish, Stiles and Lydia when they come visit Meredith. Brunski demands they come back with a court order. He then talks down to Stiles letting him know of Stilinski's overdue payment for Stiles' bills. Parrish has Brunski back off saying he owes them a favor for the Canaan PD talking him out of a DUI charge. Brunski finds Meredith's corpse after she'd hung herself. In "Perishable", Lydia and Stiles bribe Brunski with $500 for a look at Eichen House records concerning a list of people Lydia had been left by her grandmother, Lorraine Martin, who'd all committed suicide at the institution over the past decade. Brunski lets them into the file room, but just as Stiles realizes Lydia wrote down his name on the list, Brunski sneaks up behind them and tasers both of them. He binds them with restraints, and Lydia realizes the suicides committed were actually murders committed by him, including Lorraine and Meredith, and conclude that Brunski is 'the Benefactor'. Brunski bawls that some people are just beyond helping, and that he helps them, not by treatment, but by "releasing them". Brunski then plays a tape for Lydia - a recording of when he murdered Lorraine, emotionally torturing Lydia. Stiles bawls at him to turn off the tape, but he punches Stiles quiet. Lydia hears her grandmother's dying words, pleading with Brunski not to hurt "Ariel", Lorraine's nickname for her granddaughter. Brunski takes a syringe, a lethal injection and just as he stabs the syringe into Lydia's neck, Parrish appears. He orders Brunski to withdraw from Lydia's neck. Brunski scoffs, telling Parrish "Young Deputy" that he is young and bets he hasn't ever fired a gun, but Parrish proves him wrong, shooting him. As Brunski dies, he laughs telling them he wasn't controlling Meredith or anyone, he wasn't 'the Benefactor', he was being controlled by her. The true perpetuator behind the Dead Pool, the assassinations then appears, a very-much-alive Meredith Walker. Brunski was realized to have been blackmailed by Meredith in helping her put together the Dead Pool plan because of his being a serial killer. Brunski was the culprit who'd broken into the Hale Vault, stolen the Hales' bearer bonds, converted them into cash, issued the tapes to the assassins and sent out the payments electronically under Meredith's instructions.
Satomi Ito	Lily Mariye	3, 4	Werewolf
Satomi Ito is an Alpha werewolf, the leader of a Pack, over 100 years old, an old friend of Noshiko Yukimura and Talia Hale, and was Bitten. In 1943, during WWII, Satomi was amongst Japanese-Americans, along with Noshiko Yukimura, interned at Camp Oak Creek. Satomi could be seen regularly playing the game of Go. When it was uncovered that the corrupt army medics were selling medical products on the black market during an epidemic of influenza, a riot between the interns and the officers broke out. Satomi was decked by a soldier during the chaos, but Noshiko saw her injury heal and her eyes glow revealing Satomi's status as a Bitten werewolf. She'd had "monthly migraines" and the game Go worked as an anchor for her humanity. Unfortunately, Satomi in her vicious, rabid state threw a Molotov cocktail that had been brewed for the riot and she set Corporal Rhys aflame. When the interns were relocated to Eichen House institution and the Nogitsune had brought his chaos to the institution resulting in a bloodbath, Satomi had survived and helped Noshiko defeat the Dark Kitsune. In "Orphaned", it is revealed that over the years Satomi had become an Alpha of a Pack: werewolves targeted by assassins in Beacon Hills, DeMarco Montana, Carrie Hudson and Brett Talbot were all Betas of this Pack. Satomi had risen to her status by adhering to the percepts of Buddhism; several of her Pack members utilized the mantra "Three things that cannot be long hidden. The sun, the moon, the truth" as an anchor for their animal nature. Derek and Malia track down Satomi's Pack to warn them of the Dead Pool, but they find members of the Pack slaughtered. Satomi appears in "Weaponized" arriving at Deaton's animal clinic with Reed, a Pack member of hers who was sick from what killed the others, eventually dying, to Satomi's sorrow. Satomi's Pack were all infected with a virus, a variant of Canine distemper designed for werewolves. Satomi meets Derek, realizing how much he reminds her of Talia. Satomi knew Talia, she'd occasionally visited her before the fire. Derek tells her he remembers because of the tea they drank during such occasions which he found smelled awful. Deaton figures out Satomi wasn't infected with the virus because she has been inoculated from the tea recipe, from Reishi mushrooms, a powerful anecdotal. An assassin shows up and opens fire on Derek and Satomi, but Satomi dodges the bullets and kills the assassin. In "Monstrous", hunters-turned-assassins have swarmed into the area, and Satomi's Pack now totals only eight members, herself included. She and her Pack regroup at the Animal Clinic after Kira saves Brett and Lori, the youngest Betas from the hunters. Kira introduces Satomi to Scott. They bring the Pack to the abandoned Argent Arms International warehouse and rally Argent, Braeden and Derek. Satomi is wary of Argent at first, but Scott tells Satomi he trusts Argent. Argent remembers Satomi from a meeting in the past, he asks her what her mantra means to her. She responds it means 'the truth' that werewolves are inherently violent creatures cannot be denied in reflection of her loss of control that led to Rhys' death seventy years previously. The assassins arrive, and the group is able to fight them off, until the Dead Pool is shut down, terminating all the Benefactor's contracts with no casualties. Satomi is well known amongst werewolf Packs because she is one of the oldest wolves alive; she is physically identical to how she appeared back in 1943 indicating a trait of long life. Satomi is a wise, well-adjusted and progressive leader and guardian of her Pack, having taught her members control as well as talents to avoid detection. She is a philosophical and disciplined individual having mastered her inherent rage as a Bitten werewolf, admits her kind are violent creatures but she will kill if it means self-defense or protecting her Pack from harm. Satomi has immense supernatural agility, able to evade gunfire at point-blank rage and wields a suntetsu as a weapon.
Araya Calavera	Ivonne Coll	3, 4	Human
Araya Calavera is the leader of the Calaveras, a Hispanic werewolf-hunter family based out of Mexico. In Season 3B, Derek and Peter Hale had come to South America, confronting her clan to retrieve the claws of Talia Hale. Unfortunately the hunters captured the two werewolves. Araya calls off her subordinates when they are torturing the two captive wolves and interrogates them herself. She demands to know the location of "La-Loba". When Peter remains silent, she takes a blade - and lacerates Peter's right ring finger leaving him screaming in agony. Araya and her subordinates leave them be, but tells them she was only going to ask him "nine more times". Araya arrives in Beacon Hills at the Sheriff's station in "Echo House", pretending to be Argent's lawyer when he is arrested for suspicion of murder. Araya states her disappointment with his family's retirement from hunting. She supplements her opinion with her belief that Victoria honored them by committing suicide upon being Bitten. Argent defies, telling Araya Victoria would have honored Allison by staying alive. Araya leaves without revealing what she is up to. In "The Divine Move", it is discovered the "La-Loba" that Araya is hunting is actually Kate Argent. In the Season 4 premiere, "The Dark Moon", Scott and his Pack infiltrate Araya's base under the belief she had taken Derek, however, the hunters manage to outmaneuver them and take them hostage, revealing they don't have Derek. Araya has Scott and Lydia wired for torture by electricity. She has Kira turn the dial on Scott by threatening to electrocute Lydia as a test for what kind of Alpha Scott is. During the torture, Araya viciously claims Scott already knows who could have Derek, someone who was a shapeshifter, but not turned by a Bite, who had a vendetta against him. Scott figures out that Kate is whom Araya is referring to. Araya spitefully tells Scott he wouldn't have believed her if she'd just told him. Araya has been hunting Kate ever since Kate broke the Hunter's Code by refusing to commit suicide upon her transformation. Having confirmed Scott is a True Alpha by Scott overcoming the electricity by sheer determination, Araya intends to use Scott' Pack to find Kate for her as the men she has sent have wound up dead. Araya releases Scott's Pack with a not-so-veiled threat, if Scott Bites an innocent, she'll come knocking at his door. In "I.E.D.", Araya and Severo arrive in Beacon Hills to enlist Argent in hunting Kate. Argent and Severo hold each other at gunpoint, at which she amusedly calls as "a standoff". Araya recites the Hunter's Code and plays on Argent's grief over Victoria and Allison's deaths family to have him change his ways and return to being a hunter. In "Smoke and Mirrors", Araya and her men arrive at La Iglesia and face off against Kate and her Berserker. After Kate kills one hunter, Kate tells Araya she is next. Araya faces the werejaguar, telling "La-Loba" she'll see how the Calaveras die. Instead, Araya watches on as Kate is defeated, severely mauled by Derek in a full-wolf-shapeshift. When Kate escapes, Araya continues her hunt of Kate with Argent in tow as he agreed to, but on the condition she has to leave Scott and his Pack be. Araya is most often portrayed as easily amused with a wide smile on her face, while simultaneously displaying her ruthlessness and cruelty towards supernaturals, particularly werewolves, typical of a hunter, or hunters who violate the Code, even people who cross her as she murdered one of her own men for "robbing" her. While zealous and amoral as a hunter, Araya is ultimately fair as she follows the Hunter's Code not to kill were-creatures unless there's proof they've harmed innocents. Her base of operations is a music/dance club as she has an adoration for "the music of youth".
"The Mute"	Joseph Gatt	4	Unknown
"The Mute" was an assassin. "The Mute" is of an unnamed species: he has no mouth, from which he derives his codename. He communicated via a portable keyboard strapped to his glove with an output speaker which transmitted a computerized voice, and fed on a protein liquid that he injected into his neck through a test tube. He receives his assigned targets from the criminal known as "the Benefactor" to kill off the supernatural people of Beacon Hills by email. "The Mute" was hinted to have been military-trained, utilizing military grade weapons - tomahawks, his specialty, and a claymore mine. He takes pleasure in his kills, in which he taunts both Sean and Peter when he targets them. "The Mute" is first seen in "Muted" murdering the Walcotts, a family of wendigos in their home, but is unable to kill the youngest, Sean, who manages to escape to the Beacon Hills Hospital. When Sean gives into his cannibalistic urges and takes Liam to the roof with Scott in pursuit, "the Mute" shows up on the roof, killing Sean by axing him in the back. He leaves Scott and Liam be after motioning for Scott to remain quiet with the shushing motion, the finger over his face. In "The Benefactor", "the Mute" attacks Peter Hale in Derek's loft with his tomahawk laced with wolfsbane, intending to assassinate Derek. Peter is able to fight him off and take his keyboard. Deputy Parrish is able to crack the code in the keyboard to track the IP address and determines it to be connected to the school's wifi network. At the school, "the Mute" sets a trap for Derek intending to kill him off with a claymore mine which he and Stilinski are able to see first. 'The Mute' then attacks but Derek and Sheriff Stilinski are able to overpower him. Stilinski attempts to arrest him, but Peter appears and attacks the assassin, clawing him, killing him out of revenge. When Scott had faked his death in "Time of Death", "the Mute" appeared during his dream vision. Scott was subconsciously debating whether or not to kill his opponents to stop them. "The Mute" would appear representing his killer side, visually appearing to Scott while attacking or killing Liam. "The Mute" speaks to Scott in his computerized voice saying Scott is "evolving" into supposedly a killer as Scott had grown more fangs, indicating a growth in his transformation. The third time 'the Mute' appears, the assassin directs Scott how to kill with his tomahawk, saying "Let me help you. Let me show you", enticing Scott to kill Liam, his Beta.
Mason Hewitt	Khylin Rhambo	4, 5, 6	Human
Mason Hewitt is a freshman attending Beacon Hills High School in Season 4. Mason is openly gay, and has a friendly, optimistic nature, being bright, compassionate and mature for his age. Mason is Liam's best friend and an ally of Scott's Pack. Mason first appears in "The Benefactor" where he notices Liam's peculiar behavior upon Liam's transformation into a werewolf. Mason is initially kept in the dark that Liam is now supernatural, but he tries to convince his best friend to tell him his secret. In Season 5, Mason is let into Scott's Pack's supernatural circle and becomes the boyfriend for the Chimera Corey. In "I.E.D.", Mason tries to calm Liam down when the latter finds out the pre-season lacrosse scrimmage is against his old school, Devonfort Prep and when Liam later confronts his old rival, Brett Talbot. At the game, Mason tells Liam he can take Brett on, while at the same time being in denial that he thinks Brett is hot, but they both laugh it off. In "Perishable", Mason shows concern over Liam's strange behavior when he is traumatized from fighting a Berserker and his paranoia because of the Dead Pool situation. At the annual lacrosse bonfire, he tells Liam not only does he want Liam to tell him what is going on with him, he wants to help him. When Liam, Malia and Scott are disabled, Scott tells Mason their well-being is not the drinks, it is because of the music. A team of assassins had wired a sonic weapon into the music, that was weakening the three shapeshifters because of their sense of hearing. When Mason sees the three being taken away by the assassins, posing as security guards, Mason seemingly concerned about them, pulls the plug to the DJ's booth, shutting off the music. His actions unknowingly saves Scott, Liam and Malia from being burned to death. Mason, though thoroughly confused by what is going on with Liam, he nevertheless tries to convince Liam to talk to him whenever he is ready to talk in the penultimate episode of Season 4, "A Promise to the Dead". In "Smoke And Mirrors", Mason is asked by Liam to check on Lydia when she is missing, but he is attacked by one of Kate Argent's Berserkers, along with Lydia. He is confused by Lydia referring to the creature as 'not human', that if they don't stop it Scott, Liam and her friends will die, and watches as the Sheriff blows up the Berserker with a landmine. In Season 5, "Parasomnia" during sophomore year Mason, intrigued, has been obsessing over what he saw, having purchased a rare, expensive book over the summer. He shows Liam an image of a Berserker, but is annoyed when Liam brushes it off. Mason is silently amused when Liam is pranked by his middle school enemy Hayden. Liam meets Mason at the school late at night to talk but Mason notices a black wolf (a fully transformed Theo Raeken) which chases them into the school. Mason witnesses Liam scare the animal away with his werewolf roar and says with excitement "You're a werewolf!" In "Dreamcatcher", Mason is boisterous, beside himself with awe, as he is introduced to the Pack and their different supernatural species when they all meet to discuss Tracy Stewart. However, upon learning of the danger present, he then takes the situation seriously. He later learns Brett is also a werewolf, striking up a friendship with him. Mason goes along with Liam and Brett into the woods to find the sink-hole where Liam found Tracy's necklace. Mason says it is not a sinkhole, because it had to have been dug out from below meaning Tracy and the other Chimeras were buried alive, discovering the Dread Doctors' incubation process. In "Condition Terminal", Mason talks Liam into being his wingman at the club Sinema where they run into Brett. Mason catches the eye of a boy named Lucas, and makes out with him, but he and Brett notice he is another Chimera, a scorpion-man. Mason tends to Brett as he is slashed by the Chimera, witnesses Scott, Kira and Liam bring him down, and the Dread Doctors appearing, killing Lucas. In "Required Reading", Kira shows Mason the novel "The Dread Doctors", the function of which is to trigger wiped memories. Mason surmises the Fox in her can't read it, because the novel is one big language trick which according to his research kitsune have difficulty with. Mason later talks with Brett where he has given signs to look for in identifying supernaturals. Mason tells Brett of Liam's history with Hayden and their middle-school spat. In "Strange Frequencies", Mason runs into Corey, Lucas' boyfriend, and he gives his apologies to Corey over Lucas' disappearance. He catches the title of the book Corey was reading, "Miraculous Healing". Mason then sees Corey later at the club Sinema, where he sees the latter's necrotized arm has fully healed, realising Corey is another Chimera. Mason informs Scott about Corey while also snapping the True Alpha out of an illusion concocted by the Dread Doctors, but both learn Liam and Hayden have been taken. In "Ouroboros", Mason has brought Corey to the Pack and enlightened him. When Scott determines their location, Mason volunteers to go along with Scott and Malia to help find Hayden and Liam, saying Liam's his best friend. Mason gives Scott a hand-up when the latter has a meltdown over the abduction from the failed plan. In "Lies of Omission", Mason keeps an eye on and bonds with Corey when they test his new Chimera abilities, but is distressed after the latter suffers a hemorrhage, and is taken to the hospital. In "Status Asthmaticus", Mason is at the hospital, attempting to help Melissa treat a poisoned Hayden. After being informed by Melissa that Hayden is on the verge of dying, Mason leaves to find and tell Liam. Mason snaps Liam out of his supermoon-induced rage where Liam almost kills Scott, telling him Hayden died a few minutes ago. In "The Last Chimera", Mason tries his best keep Liam on his feet during his mulling over his misguided actions. When they uncover evidence that Hayden may be alive, Mason figures out how to find the Nemeton: that Liam should look with his supernatural eyes. They find the supernatural tree, just as Hayden later turns up alive with cops taking the remaining corpses. In Season 5B, Mason and Liam discuss Hayden as well as other Chimeras having been resurrected by Theo. Mason concludes that Theo is building a Pack that is loyal to him and that maybe coming back has darkened the Chimeras. He is surprised but lit up when Corey turns up alive also. A mutual flirtation, then romantic interest starts up between him and Corey, despite his reservations with Corey now being a member of Theo's Pack of Chimeras. In "Codominance", Mason tells Corey he does not want to fall in with the bad guys. Corey tells Mason there's no concept of good or bad guys anymore what with the resurrected the Beast killing its way throughout Beacon Hills. Nonetheless, the two boys share a kiss after Mason falls for Corey's charms and the two boys continue their romance during the tension between the two Packs. In "A Credible Threat", Mason dissuades a paranoid Corey from leaving reasoning ordinary people like him need people with special abilities to look out for them, wanting Corey to survive with him. Mason has an epiphany, deducing the Dread Doctors' method for bringing out the Beast's transformations is high-powered frequencies. In "The Maid of Gévaudan", Scott, Liam and Corey discover Mason is the host for the Beast of Gévaudan. Corey, terrified, attempts to keep Mason safe, who freaks out and can't believe he is the host, saying he is not even a genetic chimera. Melissa however, discovers Mason was born with twin embolization syndrome, he'd absorbed his unborn twin while in utero. The Dread Doctors easily find Mason due to his frequency and abduct him. They hook him up to the Nazi Alpha werewolf, "Der Soldat". Scott and Liam arrive but are helpless to remove the painful contraption from him. Mason urges Liam to leave when the Dread Doctors appear to trap them. Right then, the Dread Doctors' conversion process to fully revive Sebastien Valet completes. Mason is enveloped in the transformation of the Beast. Once the Beast shapeshifts back, Sebastien Valet is in Mason's place. Though Mason is now wiped from existence, his very being still exists as spark of life and memories that Sebastien has himself. Scott's Pack intend to save Mason, by invoking a myth that to cure a shapeshifter, you call out their Christian name. Lydia, using her banshee voice, Screams Mason's name at the Beast intending to have Mason remember himself before they put Sebastien away. It works and Mason is separated from the Beast's essence, alive and well to an overjoyed Corey's relief. After the Beast is destroyed for good, an alive and well Mason moves on with his life including his romance with Corey. In the season 6 premiere, Mason discovers unusual compass readings. He and Liam investigate and find an abandoned house belonging to a missing couple. Mason, Liam and Hayden investigate the smell of blood at the school and discover a man's body in the boiler room. In "Superposition", Mason and Corey witness the Ghost Riders take a boy at the school library while camouflaged. Mason explains that he can't stop thinking about Corey and his first encounter with the Ghost Riders. He has read everything there's to know about The Wild Hunt, how they come by storm, collecting souls but he does not know why they were in the library. In "Sundowning", Mason comes up with a plan to keep Gwen safe by bringing her to Scott's house and covering the doors with mountain ash. When the Ghost Riders show up, he attempts to get her to safety by leaving out back but the Ghost Riders are there as well. In "Relics", Mason is tasked with finding a way to stop the Ghost Riders as he happens to be the one who knows the most about them. He later realises that the reason the Ghost Riders left the party was because of Deputy Parrish. In "Heartless", Mason assists Scott and Corey in building a metal cage as part of a plan to catch a Ghost Rider. He is still able to see Corey despite the latter being camouflaged. Mason explains that there's a refraction of light around Corey's silhouette that he can always see. After receiving word that Scott and Liam have been unable to get the captive Ghost Rider to talk, Mason realises that during the party, the Ghost Riders were actually trying to communicate with Parrish. In "Blitzkrieg", as Mason, Liam and Hayden prepare to warn the rest of the Pack of Garrett Douglas' true identity, a Ghost Rider appears. Mason is caught around his neck by the Ghost Rider's whip. It tugs until Mason disappears. In "Riders on the Storm", Mason and Hayden find Corey hooked up to electronics in the radio room of the train station. Mason, along with Liam and Hayden unhook Corey once the train had been diverted. After the Ghost Riders depart, Mason takes Corey to the hospital where Melissa treats him with the 9 herbs.
Garrett	Mason Dye	4	Human
Garrett was a freshman at Beacon Hills High School, Violet's boyfriend and an assassin along with Violet called 'the Orphans'. Garrett was a sociopath, being calculating and arrogant. He cared only about Violet, and the bounties from his kills. His weapon was a hidden-bladed lacrosse stick. Garrett is first seen in "Muted" during lacrosse practice and is put on the lacrosse team. In "The Benefactor" he, Mason and Violet attend the party at Lydia's lake house with the other freshmen. Garret pays for the beer keg that was delivered to the party by the distributor named DeMarco Montana. It is revealed Garrett had ordered the beer keg to lure DeMarco, who was a werewolf, to the party, so Violet could kill him. Both he and Violet are working for 'the Benefactor' by assassinating supernaturals in Beacon Hills, as seen when he and Violet learn they've received the money in their account for the assassination by a text sent by 'the Benefactor' and they kiss. Garrett and Violet assassinate another werewolf on the Dead Pool in "I.E.D.", Carrie Hudson, with Garrett delivering the killing blow with his blade. Garrett tries to talk Violet out of going after Scott reasoning that Scott came out on top when the Alpha Pack went after him. He reasons their target, Beta werewolf Brett Talbot was worth a lot of money as well. During the lacrosse game, Garrett wounds Brett with his weaponized lacrosse stick which was laced with yellow monkshood, immobilizing Brett. Scott and his Pack catch onto Garrett. Violet, instead of assassinating Brett, sets a trap for Scott which only ends with Scott overpowering Violet. When Violet is taken into police custody in "Orphaned", Garret goes into hiding. Out in the Beacon Hills Preserve, Garrett kidnaps Liam, poisons him with wolfsbane and traps him in a well deep in the preserve. He uses Liam as a bargaining chip to have Scott help him free Violet from the police, telling the Alpha that Liam will die if the wolfsbane reaches his heart. Scott and Garret follow the federal transport vehicle holding Violet. They come up to the overturned vehicle which had already been attacked by Kate and her Berserkers and Violet is taken. Garrett takes out his bladed lacrosse stick, rips off the mesh net, and wields his weapon ready to take on the Berserker in his path. He goads and dares the Berserker to bring it to him but the other demon sneaks up behind him, and runs Garrett through with a bone, killing him.
Violet	Samantha Logan	4	Human
Violet was a freshman at Beacon Hills High School and an assassin along with her boyfriend and partner Garrett, known as 'the Orphans', assassins for the Dead Pool. Violet was impulsive, efficient, and greedy only caring about the payments for her jobs and Garrett, showing no remorse for her actions. Violet's weapon was a thermal cut wire that was disguised as a necklace to behead her victims. Violet and Garrett both attend Lydia's lake house party in the episode "The Benefactor". Violet is seen coming upon the werewolf DeMarco Montana. She appears behind, strangles and beheads him with her necklace, her wire. Sending a picture of her kill to 'the Benefactor', she returns to Garrett's side afterwards who reveals that they've been paid for the assassination. They openly embrace and kiss. In "I.E.D.", Violet wants to start targeting people worth "the seven-figure-money", specifically Scott as he has the biggest bounty on the Dead Pool. Garret cautions her against going after him as Scott was left standing after the Alpha Pack went after him. When their target, Brett Talbot, is immobilized with wolfsbane, Violet goes in for the kill, but when Scott shows up to save Brett, Violet decides to target the True Alpha anyway. She wraps her wire around his neck, taking glee in having "got an Alpha", but Scott overcomes the wire and knocks her unconscious. Violet is then arrested in "Orphaned" by Stilinski, Parrish and Rafael McCall. Violet plays innocent saying she is just a student, but Rafael identifies she and Garrett as 'the Orphans' from her weapon, the thermal cut wire which had reportedly been used in a dozen murders. Violet is held in custody to be taken into a federal transport vehicle but smugly smiles at Scott, knowing Garrett is implementing a plan to free her using Scott by having Liam as leverage. Before Garrett and Scott can move up to the vehicle, Kate Argent along with her Berserkers attacks the vehicle. Violet is taken hostage by Kate to interrogate her for information on the Benefactor and holds her at the abandoned Argent Arms International warehouse, a building the Argents once used for their arms business. Kate eventually kills Violet.
Brett Talbot	Cody Saintgnue	4, 5, 6	Werewolf
Brett Talbot is a born Beta werewolf of Satomi's Pack and a lacrosse player at Liam's old school, Devonford Prep. Brett is Liam's rival. Brett is originally portrayed as abrasive and a jerk disliking Liam because of his violent behavior, but is later seen to be a friendly, loyal member in his Pack, and is protective of his younger sister Lori, and eventually becomes friends with Liam, Mason Hewitt and an ally of Scott's Pack. Brett is also bisexual. Brett and Lori were adopted by Satomi after their birth parents were killed in a fire. Brett first appears in "I.E.D.", when his lacrosse team arrive at Beacon Hills High for the pre-season scrimmage. Liam approaches Brett, attempting to show sportsmanship, but Brett laughs it off. He threatens Liam he and his teammates are going to break him in half for what he did to their coach's car. During the game, Brett refuses to let Liam off for the car incident when Scott asks him to as Scott was attempting to keep Liam from losing control. When Brett comes into a collision with Liam and Garrett, he is transported to the locker's room, Stiles learns Brett is on the Dead Pool, worth $1m and is a Beta werewolf. Brett wasn't initially identified as a werewolf because he was taught how to mask his scent. He is attacked by the assassin Violet and is defenseless because the other assassin Garrett had poisoned him with a blade laced with yellow monkshood. Brett is saved by Scott, and is taken to Deaton's clinic for treatment by Stiles and Derek. Brett chants the mantra, "The sun, the moon, the truth". This allows Deaton, Derek and Peter to figure out that Brett is from a Pack which has an affinity for Buddhism, and whose Alpha is Satomi Ito. In "Monstrous", Brett, along with Lori are seen being chased by assassins who are hunters. Brett stands in front of Lori to protect her when hunters have laser sights on them, and arrows are subsequently fired at them. Kira saves their lives slicing the arrows in mid-air. At the Animal Clinic, Brett and Lori have regrouped with Satomi and the remaining Pack members who are all exhausted and battle-weary. They all meet Scott who has them take refuge at the Argent Arms Int. warehouse until the Dead Pool is finally shut down, saving the rest of the Pack. In "A Promise to the Dead", Brett has made peace with Liam, in gratitude for Scott's Pack saving he, Lori and his Pack members. During the real game against Beacon Hills High, Liam is still traumatized from fighting the Berserkers. Brett tackles Liam, body checking him to get Liam realize he is alive. After the game, Brett ultimately helps his former rival overcome his trauma by telling Liam he is lucky Scott is his Alpha because Scott is a True Alpha, he gained his power not by killing, dominance or taking power from others, Scott earned his status. Liam is ultimately inspired when Brett tells him he is not strong because he has super strength, but because he endures. In Season 5 "Dreamcatchers", Brett is playing lacrosse when Liam and Mason visit and come to him asking if Satomi knew of any Alpha that could have Bitten new supernatural Tracy Stewart. Brett replies he hasn't seen Tracy before. He informs the newly enlightened-Mason on some general werewolf lore. He accompanies Liam and Mason for the sink-hole where Tracy fell in and left her necklace. The three of them determine that Tracy had been buried alive, uncovering the Dread Doctor's incubation process for the Chimeras. In "Condition Terminal", at the bi club Sinema, Brett dances and flirts with both a guy and a girl and runs into Liam and Mason again. He shares shots with Mason, but later protects him from Lucas, a werewolf/scorpion Chimera. Brett is slashed by the Chimera, but Lucas is eventually brought down by Scott, Kira and Liam. All five of them witness the Dread Doctors as they appear and kill Lucas. In "Required Reading", after eight new Chimeras have been created, Brett continues to help out, reporting that everyone at Devonfort seems normal. He gives Mason signs to look for in supernatural creatures. He is amused at the tension between Liam and Hayden. A similarly amused Mason tells Brett how Liam's spat with Hayden began in middle school. In "A Credible Threat", a charity game between Beacon Hills and Devonford Prep for cancer is being held. Brett and his teammates arrive. He and his sister Lori assist Scott and his Pack's attempt to prevent another attack by the Beast of Gévaudan and locate the teenage chimera that is being used as its host. When Kira loses control, becomes possessed by her Fox Spirit, Brett arranges to have her kicked off the field by provoking the Fox. In Season 6B, Brett and Lori are killed after they are both intentionally hit by a car, arranged by Gerard.
Gabriel Valack	Steven Brand	4, 5	Unknown
Gabriel Valack is well known in the supernatural underworld for his supply of information. Valack displays psychic abilities including clairvoyance, telepathy and the talent to glamour himself. First appearing at Season 4's end, Valack is an inmate held in the underground prison of Eichen House for supernatural beings. Valack has a third eye rooted inside his skull which supplements his powers. The eye is visible by a hole in his head caused by trepanation. Valack first appears in Season 4 "A Promise to the Dead" in his cell reading a romance novel. He is visited by Deaton who introduces himself. Valack lets Deaton know he is aware Deaton's specialty is not actually "cats and dogs". Deaton asks for information on Valack's knowledge of South American lore. Valack corrects Deaton he wants to know about Kate Argent, about "La Loba" or "the Bone Woman". Deaton wishes to know what Kate had done to Derek (regressing Derek back to his teenage self), the subsequent loss of his powers asking if Derek could be dying. Valack tells Deaton he'll have to move closer. Deaton reluctantly complies. Valack displays his third eye; it opens up and Deaton receives a vision of La Iglesia, but is rendered unconscious. In "Smoke and Mirrors", after his plan to have Scott killed fails, Peter Hale is incarcerated for his crimes, and he is placed in Valack's cell. After Peter swears he'll escape, Valack humors the werewolf due to the mountain ash all around them. Peter demands to know who he is. Valack replies he could tell Peter, but that it will be easier to just "show (him)" and removes his bandage, revealing him his third eye. Peter screams in horror, slamming against the Plexiglas. Valack smirks. In Season 5, Scott's Pack are led to Valack by the novel "The Dread Doctors" by a T.R. McCammon, illustrating the Doctors in "A Novel Approach". At Eichen House, Stiles and Lydia visit Valack for information. Peter has been moved to a new cell. Valack knows what they want, asking for the book, and that the Dread Doctors are in Beacon Hills also. Valack affirms he is the author under a pseudonym. He says the Doctors gain their power, longevity and erase the memories of those who've encountered them by their discovering of electromagnetic forces. When Lydia asks what they want, Valack replies he wants Lydia to record a banshee Scream as the deal. Stiles is hesitant, but Valack fires back that the Doctors are in Beacon Hills because their Pack reignited the Nemeton. When the Dread Doctors infiltrate the institution for Valack, he hurriedly says the book is a tool that triggers erased memory senses of those who have encountered the Doctors. Lydia complies, handing the recorder back through the cell flap. As the Doctors approach, Valack yells "Read the book!". Stiles and Lydia hide and leave, but the Dread Doctors open Valack's cell. Using a device, they tear out his third eye. The Dread Doctors leave him in pain. Valack then plays the recorder playing Lydia's Scream against the cell wall glass of his cell, the subsequent compression causing the glass to crack, engineering his escape from his cell. In Season 5B, Valack has taken over Eichen House. In "The Last Chimera", after Lydia is rendered catatonic at the hands of Theo Raeken, when Natalie Martin signs a transfer paper for Lydia to be brought to Eichen House, Valack (glamoured as Dr. Conrad Fenris) promises Natalie her daughter will be safe. It is revealed Valack was chief medical officer at Eichen House before his imprisonment. Valack experimented on supernatural patients, any creature he could get his hands on. Performing trepanation would heighten the powers of the subject, but the new levels were uncontrollable resulting in his subjects dying out. Once Lydia comes out of her catatonic state, and attempts to escape, Valack distracts her by glamouring as Aiden to her shock. Valack has Lydia restrained and presses her to remember what has happened to the Pack over the last few weeks. Lydia (seeing right through Valack's veil) is still recovering and is amnesiac. Valack produces a drilling device used for trepanation and performs a procedure on her. When Lydia comes to, she has a vision of the time and circumstances of when Theo killed his older sister. Valack has amplified Lydia's powers to near dangerous levels in that her Scream can kill everyone around her and herself. He uses her newly gained extrasensory perception to find out more on Theo and the Dread Doctors. In "Amplification", just as Valack is questioning Lydia, both Theo and Scott's Packs, and Parrish's hellhound side attempt a jailbreak for Lydia. In the ensuing struggle between Parrish and Theo's Pack, Valack slips away with Lydia. Lydia figures out Valack "wants (her) to be his eyes". He unveils a mystical mask with electromagnetic properties akin to those worn by the Dread Doctors. He modifies the Screams in Lydia's head so to allow her to focus. If Lydia were to find the teenage Chimera that acts as the Beast's host, her powers at that point will surely kill her, but placates that it may end up saving her friends' lives. Theo and Stiles arrive, their actions disrupting his equipment, letting Lydia's power spiral again. Valack decides it is time for drastic measures and prepares to encase her with the mask, but Lydia lets out an uncontrolled Scream: half of Valack's head is blown off, killing him.
Theo Raeken	Cody Christian	5, 6	Chimera
Theodore "Theo" Raeken is a werewolf/werecoyote Chimera. Theo was classmates with Scott and Stiles in fourth grade. He had an older sister named Tara who'd wandered into the woods during a cold night and died from exposure. Theo had found her body and his family moved away. In truth, Theo had remorselessly murdered his sister at the behest of the Dread Doctors. Theo wanted his sister's heart so the Doctors would transplant the organ into him and he could become their first experimental Chimera. The Doctors chose Theo for his being "the perfect evil", willing to murder his caring sister who looked out for him. He then became a henchman for the Doctors. Theo first appears in Season 5 "Creatures of the Night", in his werewolf form, helping Scott and Kira fight off the werewolf/garuda Chimera Belasko. Scott eventually recognizes him. Theo says he has come back to Beacon Hills because he had heard of Scott McCall, his grade school friend, becoming a True Alpha, and wishes to join his Pack. In "Parasomnia", Scott and Stiles, at Stiles' urging, ask Theo for his story. Theo recalls he'd been Bitten when he was skateboarding in a neighbours' empty pool when an Alpha came upon him. This said Alpha was killed before Theo's first full moon by two members of his own Pack, twins (hinting to be Ethan and Aiden). He also recalls a moment in grade school which Scott remembers that convinces him. Stiles however, remains suspicious. Stiles later compares Theo's father's signature from his school transfer form to that of a speeding ticket from years ago, insisting they are not similar. Theo attempts to placate Stiles, saying he has Scott, someone who'll always look out for you, but he does not, that he is meant to be part of the Pack. However, Theo is later seen with his parents, who are actually imposters and are terrified of him. Theo breaks the man's hand to put it in a cast, so to explain Stiles' evidence. In "Dreamcatchers", Theo inconspicuously observes the events caused by the Chimera Tracy Stewart. He volunteers to help with the situation, saying it does not have to mean he is being accepted by them. He saves a bleeding Lydia's life in "Condition Terminal" using his belt as a tourniquet. However, Theo's simultaneously working as a mole for the Dread Doctors. In their lair, he wickedly advises new Chimera, the delinquent Donovan into killing Stiles if he wants to cause the Sheriff "soul-crushing pain". In "Required Reading", Theo sets about sabotaging and breaking the Pack apart; he takes advantage of Stiles and Malia's secrets in their relationship (Stiles' killing Donovan in self-defense, and Malia impulsively confiding in Theo, because of his coyote side, that the Desert Wolf caused her family's crash) and plants seeds of doubt in Scott regarding Kira due to her Kitsune Evolution. Theo then blackmails Stiles using Donovan's death into staying quiet about Theo killing a new Chimera, allegedly to save the former's life. He and Stiles form a forced partnership in "Strange Frequencies". He advises Stiles that Scott wouldn't be a True Alpha if he'd reject Stiles for killing in self-defense while successfully pulling Stiles under his influence. Theo is completely accepted by the Pack in "Ouroboros" after finding an abducted Liam and Hayden. The then uses the latter two's romance to his advantage, staging Hayden's slow lethal injection once she is declared a "failure", and planting the idea in Liam's head that the Bite could save her, knowing Scott would say no. Theo lies to Scott on how Donovan's death at Stiles' hands occurred falsifying Stiles had murdered him in a rage, effectively breaking apart his and Stiles' friendship. In "Status Asthmaticus", Theo shows his true colors and executes his plan to take Scott's Pack and True Alpha status for himself. HINmanipulates Liam to kill Scott (because only Liam can steal Scott's True Alpha status, allowing Theo to steal it himself afterwards) and forces Stiles to make a choice to save Scott or his dad. After Liam fails, Theo angrily comes back to kill Scott himself. Scott, weakened, tells Theo his Pack will never follow him because he is "barely even human". He kills Scott in a petty tantrum. Theo then uses a mind-meld on a kidnapped Lydia, rendering her catatonic, so to find the Nemeton where the deceased Chimeras are kept by Parrish, and succeeds. Using the blood of 'The Soldier', the Doctors' incubated Alpha werewolf, revives four Chimeras, Hayden, Corey, Tracy and Josh. Theo declares to the revived teens he is their Alpha, and they belong to him. Theo's goal is revealed to become a proper werewolf, an actual powerful Alpha. In Season 5B, he is angry that dominating a Pack did not grant him the power, then irked upon discovering Scott is alive. Ever deceptive and self-serving, Theo takes command of his Pack, devising ways to help them develop and control their abilities, feeding them false promises only he can keep them safe when in truth dominating them, having them turn into killers. In "Damnatio Memoriae", aware that Parrish is a hellhound and the Dread Doctors have resurrected the Beast of Gévaudan, Theo proposes a truce with Scott's allies saying the Beast is what they need to worry about. Theo sets about tracking down the ancient werewolf. In "The Sword and the Spirit", Theo seduces Malia into letting him help her find the Desert Wolf. He then betrays Malia and Braeden revealing he'd made a deal with the assassin. In exchange for bringing Malia to her, Corrine hands him the garuda talons from the late Chimera Belasko, appropriated from Deaton, and leaves Malia to die. Theo then meets with the Alpha Deucalion whom his Pack have tracked down and captured. Theo wishes for the Demon Wolf to give show him how to steal the Beast's power. In exchange, Deucalion says he wants Scott's eyes. In "Amplification", Theo leads Tracy, Corey and Josh into Eichen House to abduct Lydia to lure out Parrish so to use the hellhound against the Beast. Once he hears Valack speak of his Mask created by the Dread Doctors, he changes his mind and instead takes the Mask in order to identify the Beast. In "The Beast of Beacon Hills", now knowing the talons won't work and his Pack dwindling, Theo accepts an alliance from Deucalion who tells him the secret to stealing power from others - by taking pain, then life, then "the spark of power". Immediately afterwards, he kills Josh to absorb the latter's electrical power, allowing him to wear the Mask to track down the Beast, seeing its true human – Sebastien Valet. Theo waits for his opportunity for the Beast to appear and complete its transformation. In "Apotheosis", after his first attempt to take the Beast goes wrong, Theo then kills Tracy to steal her power, siphoning her Kanima capabilities. He electrocutes Deucalion and ambushes Scott's Pack as they attempt to save Mason, testing his new powers. Up against the Beast, Theo makes his move to steal Sebastien's power. It fails this time and Sebastien thrashes him. Theo realizes Deucalion double crossed him, working with Scott all along then has his neck snapped by the Demon Wolf. After the Beast is destroyed, a recovered Theo angrily attempts to kill everyone present. Kira, however deflects his attack. She tells Theo a message from the skinwalkers – his sister wants to see him. Kira, harnessing the skinwalkers' power opens an underworld chasm beneath Theo. Petrified, Theo sees the ghost of his sister emerge who right away grabs him, effortlessly dragging him down with her. Theo desperately pleads with Scott to help him, but everyone just watches as he is pulled down, banished to Hell. In season 6A "Ghosted", Theo is released from the ground by Liam who used Kira's sword to do so. He restrains Liam against a wall, demanding to know where his sister is, only to be reminded that she is dead. It is discovered that Theo no longer has Josh's electricity manipulation and Tracy's ability to produce Kanima venom. He reveals to Liam and Hayden that he remembers Stiles who had been taken by the Ghost Riders. In "Heartless", Theo suffers a recurring nightmare, each one ending exactly as the last, with his sister Tara tearing his heart from his chest. The cycle continues until he tells her that it is okay, she does not have to stop. In reality, he is being bashed repeatedly by a furious Malia. He later assists Scott and his friends in their plan to catch a Ghost Rider. While the others are distracted by getting Parrish away from the Ghost Rider, Theo is forced by Garrett Douglas to break a mountain ash barrier around the cage and he witnesses Garrett killing the Ghost Rider. In "Blitzkrieg", Theo agrees to tell Liam, Hayden and Mason everything he knows about Garrett Douglas, but only on the condition that Liam breaks the sword. Upon completion, Theo lives up to his end, explaining Garrett's past with WWII and the Dread Doctors. In "Memory Found", Theo helps Liam lure the Ghost Riders to the hospital to distract them. They manage to kill a few but with more coming, Theo saves Liam by pushing him into the lift and shutting him in. He takes on the Ghost Riders all by himself, the confrontation ends with a single gunshot. In "Riders on the Storm", Theo is revealed to be alright and gives Liam more time to get into the rift. He later joins Scott, Malia and Peter in fighting Garrett's army of Ghost Riders.In Season 6B, he is shown to be homeless and helps the last of Satomi's pack members reach Scott and aids Liam in the War. Personality-wise, Theo is charming, charismatic and has a serene demeanor. He is a sociopath, liar and trickster, being manipulative, cunning, seductive, self-serving, and feels no remorse, guilt nor care for who gets hurt because of his actions.At the end of the series, he is seen Being able to take away another's pain, proving that he has learnt compassion. Being a Chimera, Theo is unaffected by everyday supernatural rules. He has killed people, but displays the golden Wolf eyes of an innocent. He can also penetrate mountain ash barriers and cast them himself. Theo has traits of both werewolves and coyotes. He is able to shapeshift into a werewolf, and because of his werecoyote part, he can shapeshift to both a full wolf and a full coyote form. After killing Tracy and Josh, taking their power, he gains the abilities of electricity manipulation and to produce Kanima venom.
"The Dread Doctors"	Marti Matulis (The Surgeon); Daniel Bonjour (Marcel/The Surgeon); Caitlin Dechelle (The Geneticist); Douglas Tait (The Pathologist)	5, 6	Posthuman
The three Dread Doctors are para-scientists who perform experiments upon supernatural beings in Beacon Hills, altering and producing Chimeras. They are known individually as the Pathologist and the Geneticist, and are led by the Surgeon. At the end of Season 5, the Surgeon's identity is revealed to be Marcel, the best friend of Sebastien Valet, the Beast of Gévaudan. The Dread Doctors were all once human scientists who worshipped, were obsessed with the supernatural. Discovering and manipulating the secrets of electromagnetism, the Doctors rescinded their humanity, giving them power, including mass illusionary projection, phasing, teleportation, and the ability to harness and manipulate electronic frequencies. The Doctors are frequently outfitted with breathing tubes and wear special masks infused with electromagnetism ("a unique and deadly power") created through pseudoscience by the Surgeon. They hold a Nazi Alpha werewolf known as "Der Soldat" (German for "The Soldier") who fought in WWII in a large green tube whose blood provides them with a serum with rejuvenating properties to restore their health and prolong their lifespans. In Season 5A, the Dread Doctors are partners with Theo Raeken, working to break Scott McCall's Pack and fellowship apart. The three para-scientists also perform a procedure on Kira to amplify her Thunder Kitsune power to near dangerous levels for their advantage. In "Creatures of the Night", the Dread Doctors send a Chimera named Belasko to siphon Scott's True Alpha power. When he fails, they declare him useless, telling him "no second chances". The Surgeon spears Belasko with his sword cane. Throughout the season, the Dread Doctors carry out their experiments abducting, converting and brainwashing innocent teenagers with two sets of DNA, altering them into Chimeras, creatures with incongruous body parts of more than one supernatural creature, werewolf claws, garuda talons, Kanima hide and venom, wendigo teeth, etc., which also breaking the set rules of the supernatural, e.g. their produced Chimeras can penetrate mountain ash barriers. They come into conflict with Scott's Pack who attempt to stop their actions, while simultaneously employing Theo to act as a spy amongst the Pack for them. When the Chimeras come to bleed mercury, the Doctors kill them off declaring them failures; they are aiming, searching for a "success". In "A Novel Approach", Theo reports to the Doctors Scott's Pack is going to see Valack at Eichen at nightfall. Eichen House was closed off to the Dread Doctors due to electromagnetic energy from the convergence of ley lines. Kira's Thunder Kitsune power however, disrupted the defences allowing the Doctors to enter. They take the opportunity to restrain Valack and rip out his third eye, presumably because of his clairvoyance ability being a threat to them. In "Strange Frequencies", the Doctors move to experiment on their latest victim, Hayden Romero, but Scott's Pack manage to intervene. They attempt to capture the Doctors by disrupting their frequency using cellphone jammers. The Doctors outsmart them, the Surgeon declaring they run "on a frequency (they) can't possibly imagine". Successfully abducting Hayden, and after performing experimentation, Hayden is declared a failure. In "Lies of Omission", Theo requests Hayden be kept alive a little longer so to use her to his advantage in breaking apart Scott's Pack. The Surgeon tells Theo he has until the perigee syzygy (the upcoming supermoon). In "Status Asthmaticus", the Doctors observe their latest Chimera, the Surgeon stating "Success ... imminent." The Doctors later on, look upon a fresco of two monsters in battle. The Surgeon pronouncing the Chimera as "La Bete", and a "success". In Season 5B, Valack reveals the Dread Doctors' goal was to resurrect the most dangerous killing machine - the Beast of Gévaudan. The Doctors' methods were to achieve the process of reviving the ancient werewolf with their last chimera test subject serving as a host for the creature from their skills in pseudoscience. All the other Chimeras were only guinea pigs to perfect their experiment. Another requirement for the process to work was to kill off the failed Chimeras ("Failure compromises the experiment pool"). The Doctors also end their partnership with Theo, allowing him to use the Soldier's blood to revive several Chimeras to form his own Pack. With their work completed, the Doctors watch over and protect the Beast from discovery, covering up its carnage. They now want the Beast to remember itself in its previous life. To do this, they nurture its naturally lethal actions as it rampages throughout Beacon County, triggering the Beast's shapeshifting using high-powered frequencies and inconspicuously leave the Beast the message 'Damnatio Memoriae'. In "The Beast of Beacon Hills", after Scott's Pack discover Mason is the host for the Beast, the Doctors abduct Mason hiding him in a cabin and hook him up to the Soldier preventing him from escaping to allow for the transformation to finish. Scott, Liam and Theo arrive for Mason before the Doctors corner them, having anticipated Theo would come to take the Beast's power. The Surgeon goads his narcissistic henchman openly declaring him a failure for their experiment while also laying out their epiphany of their work. The lead para-scientist adds Theo's ultimate failure however provided a turning viewpoint in their paranormal research for the Chimeras, for reviving "La Bête": the 'banality of evil'. The Dread Doctors initially believed that to resurrect the Beast, the perfect killer, they first needed the "perfect evil". They chose Theo as the ideal candidate as Theo would murder his caring sister given motive and opportunity. However, they realized Theo failed in the end because 'true evil' comes only from corrupting someone truly good which is why Mason is the success. An infuriated Theo assaults his former masters to no use. The Doctors witness Mason determinedly, resolutely unpluck himself from the device when the Doctors attack Scott and Liam; the "corruption" they'd planned for him. The transformation occurs and the Surgeon excitedly notes the Beast is transforming without frequency. The Beast of Gévaudan is fully revived, remembering its name. The ancient werewolf slaughters the Doctors, killing the Pathologist and the Geneticist, but the Surgeon revels in his "Success", before he too is mauled by the Beast and it runs into the night. In "Apotheosis", the Surgeon is still partially alive. Scott and Liam take him to the animal clinic to treat and for information. The lead para-scientist however, jolts awake and hears the voice of Beast of Gevuadan, Sebastien Valet calling to him. He bursts out of the clinic, and staggers to his knees before Sebastien walks up to him. Sebastien rips off the Mask, revealing his disfigured, inhuman face. Sebastien recognizes the Surgeon as his loving friend, Marcel. Sebastien scolds Marcel that if his appearance is what immortality promised him, he was misled. Marcel, dying, justifies and declares his centuries of twisted acts and experiments was all for Sebastien. He tells Sebastien the Pike, which he now uses as his cane was taken by the Argents. Marcel dies.
Hayden Romero	Victoria Moroles	5, 6	Werewolf (currently) Chimera (formerly)
Hayden Romero is a sophomore and soccer player at Beacon Hills High, and the girlfriend of Liam. Hayden's older sister, Valerie Clark is also her guardian. Hayden has an independent nature, being tomboyish, tenacious, down-to-earth and mischievous, but eventually shows a warmer, empathic and braver side, being supportive of those in times of need. In Season 5, Hayden is a werewolf/werejaguar Chimera from the Dread Doctors' experimentation. She is brought back to life by the Theo Raeken after being killed then brought into his Chimera Pack, but later willingly accepts the Bite from Scott, becoming a new Beta werewolf in his Pack. Hayden first appears in "Parasomnia" in Ken Yukimura's history class with Mason and Liam. Hayden chews bubblegum while Liam is chagrined that he has to sit next to her. When Ken asks Liam to sit, he sees he'd sat in Hayden's gum, to her satisfaction. Beside Liam at the lockers, she tells him she is not still pissed off for sixth grade, she insists "I'm vengeful." Back in grade school, Liam had accidentally backhanded Hayden's face during a fight he had with another boy on year book picture day as collateral damage, for which earned she bears him a grudge. Hayden has a part-time job as a shot-girl at the bi club Sinema, to help her sister make ends meet for her medication for a kidney transplant she had a few years earlier. In "Dreamcatchers", Hayden notices Tracy Stewart, a senior, next to her in class. Tracy grabs Hayden's arm, clawing her to the latter's distress. After Tracy lets go then collapses, Hayden curiously watches, as Scott and his Pack take Tracy out of the school. Hayden goes to the bathroom to clean up Tracy's claw marks, but after the blood is washed away, she sees, to her astonishment, the wound has healed. In "Condition Terminal" Hayden spitefully allows Mason and Liam access to the club for a plus $50. Liam later accidentally knocks over shots she is carrying, to her ire. In "Required Reading", Liam attempts to mend his relationship with her, starting with paying her back for the shots. Hayden refuses, saying she does not care about his nice guy act. Liam answers she can keep on hating him for the sixth grade, but insists on paying her back. Hayden eventually accepts some of the debt. Hayden has a faceoff with Liam over their respective sports at school PE. She then sees Liam later rush to assist an asthmatic Scott with an inhaler. She smiles, touched at this display of care. Hayden decides to convince Liam to forget the shots, because her obnoxious boss Phil takes half her money anyway, hearing it from several yards away, which Liam catches. He places a glow stick near her face to her confusion, but her eyes reflect the light, revealing she is a Chimera. Hayden is annoyed, weirded out when Liam attempts to convince her of the supernatural world. After Liam shows her his Wolf face, his rescuing her from the Dread Doctors, brought to Scott's Pack and then being horrified at seeing her own werewolf features, she answers them: "I believe you". In "Strange Frequencies", Scott's Pack utilizes a plan to protect Hayden from the Dread Doctors as well as attempt to capture one of them. Liam stays by Hayden's side. She asks herself "what am I", with Liam answering she is Hayden. Touched more than ever, Hayden softens up towards Liam, their feelings for each other deepening. The plan fails, with Liam and Hayden being captured. In "Ouroboros", to her distress, Hayden is experimented upon by the Doctors, resulting in her bleeding black blood. She and Liam comfort each other while held captive, holding hands, seeing another Chimera Zach being taken away. Eventually, they are 'rescued' by Theo. Hayden and Liam then kiss, with Liam also activating his pain siphoning ability taking away her pain. Hayden is ultimately amazed and inspired at this, her grudge towards him completely gone. Liam and Hayden spend the night afterwards at Scott's house, starting a romantic relationship. In "Lies of Omission" Hayden and Liam take content in their newfound bliss. Hayden's wounds heal, but she soon starts to bleed mercury, indicating she is a failure. Scott's Pack do their best to keep her safe, but she is soon poisoned by the Doctors. Melissa McCall attempts to treat her. Faced with the possibility of dying, Hayden asks Scott for her sister. Unfortunately, she slowly dies, to Liam's devastation. Her body is taken by Parrish to the Nemeton. Theo finds the supernatural tree, then using the blood of the Dread Doctors' incubated Alpha werewolf "Der Soldat", he revives Hayden along with Corey, Tracy Stewart and Josh Diaz, bringing them back to life. Theo announces to the four Chimeras he is their Alpha and they are his Pack. They instinctively follow Theo, all of them following his orders as if in a trance. In "The Last Chimera", after Liam and Mason locate the Nemeton (Liam being a supernatural creature), Hayden reveals herself to Liam leading the cops to the location revealing the remaining Chimera corpses so to cover up her death and those of the others'. In Season 5B, Hayden is emotionally broken after having died, uncertain on how to feel about coming back to life. She becomes more alert, paranoid taking a higher sense of self-preservation. Like the other Chimeras, she falls under Theo's influence, following him, falling for his words that only he can keep them safe. Hayden is miserable over being unable to talk to her sister about her experiences. Nonetheless, she firmly decides she can't die again for Valerie's sake. Hayden is frosty towards Liam for his leaving her to die and appalled at his trying to kill Scott. Liam confronts her for being in Theo's Pack after the latter's treachery is revealed. In "Codominance", Hayden makes up with him professing that Theo can keep her safe in a way Scott can't. She also adds that nothing feels right after being revived except for when she is with him. She admits her fear of dying again, and . She and Liam ultimately carry on then consummate their romance. Liam continually pushes for her to get away from Theo. In "Amplification", Hayden takes watch over the captive Deucalion, fully aware Theo considers her a liability where Liam is concerned. Deucalion lets her know that Theo will only die if he follows through with his plan to steal the Beast's power using the Garuda talons. He also leaves her cryptic advice about what her role is, regarding her conflict about being with Liam during the enmity between the Packs. Soon, Hayden pulls herself together, regains her confidence and grows disillusioned about standing by Theo, not passing along Deucalion's message about the talons. In "A Credible Threat", inspired by both Scott and Liam's steadfastly drive to protect by identifying the Beast, she tells Liam she is with Scott's Pack and wants to be with him, to his joy. In "The Maid of Gevaudan", after the Beast injures Liam, Hayden helps get him to safety, then discovers her own pain siphoning ability by kissing Liam, to her amazement. When Mason is identified as the vessel for the Beast of Gévaudan, Hayden supportively assists Liam in trying to find him and tries to comfort a worried Corey. In "Apotheosis", Hayden rushes to the Sheriff's station where Sebastien Valet, the Beast has attacked, worried for her sister. Sebastien fatally mauls Hayden after kidnapping her for information, but is lured away by the Argents. At the animal clinic, Deaton manages to stabilize Hayden's wound, but he can't answer if or when she'll heal due to her invalidated Chimera status. To fully heal herself, of her own choice and volition, Hayden accepts the Bite from a compliant Scott. At the full moon, Hayden, now a real Beta werewolf, shares a kiss with Liam. In the season 6 premiere "Memory Lost", Hayden, along with Liam and Mason investigate the smell of blood inside the school and discover a man's body in the boiler room. In "Sundowning", Hayden confronts a classmate named Gwen after discovering that her sister is missing. She explains that Gwen's sister was taken by the Ghost Riders, which would make Gwen their next target as she saw the hunt occur. In "Relics", Hayden is forced to fight after Parrish is taken down by a Ghost Rider. She shifts into her werewolf form, but as she charges towards the Ghost Rider, a lightning strike blinds her and when she looks back, the Ghost Rider is gone. In "Ghosted", Hayden comes up with a plan to trap a Ghost Rider, an admittedly bad one. However, when that goes awry, Liam suggests an even worse back up plan that Hayden insists will go bad. In "Heartless", Hayden volunteers to lure the Ghost Rider into a cage, explaining that she is faster than Liam. As the Ghost Rider arrives, everything goes as planned on her end, she runs in one side and out through the other. In "Blitzkrieg", Hayden intervenes as Liam is nearly erased by a Ghost Rider, first disarming the Rider, then flipping him to the ground. Despite their best efforts, they're no match. She allows herself to be taken so Liam can escape. In "Riders on the Storm", Hayden and Mason try to find Corey after they recognise his voice on a call box. When Liam comes through the rift, she kisses him in relief before they continue their search. After finding Corey hooked up in the radio room, Hayden is informed by Liam that they can't unplug Corey until the train has been diverted. Once the train has been diverted, Hayden helps Liam and Mason unplug Corey which takes them and everyone else out of the Wild Hunt.
Donovan Donati	Ashton Moio	5	Chimera
Donovan Donati is a petty criminal. As a result of the Dread Doctors' experimentation, he is a wendigo/lamprey Chimera. Donovan applied to become a Sheriff's Deputy, wanting to be like his father. He failed the aptitude test with the psychological evaluation declaring him "not suitable for law enforcement", particularly his anger expression inventory. He blames Stilinski for not being able to pursue his dream job, and constantly threatens him. In "Creatures of the Night", Donovan first appears being dragged into the Sheriff's station by Deputies Clark and Cordova, arrested for breaking and entering, and possession of a weapon. Sheriff Stilinski comes up to Donovan, reminding him the next time he ran afoul of the law would be jail time. Donovan tries to reason with Stilinski, but the Sheriff simply says "Book him". Donovan then immediately and repeatedly screams and curses at Stilinski, telling him he is dead. In "Dreamcatcher" Donovan is readied for prison transport by Clark and Parrish. His attorney, Mr. Stewart arrives wishing to converse a reasonable deal. Donovan listens, but then stubbornly bawls at the Sheriff, threatening to gut him with a knife in exploratory detail. Stilinski orders Donovan be taken out. As Donovan is brought to jail in the prison transport van, the vehicle is attacked by a shapeshifted girl who Mr. Stewart calls Tracy - his daughter. Donovan witnesses Tracy savaging the van, but escapes out the back, terrified. He looks back just as Tracy kills Mr. Stewart. Suddenly he runs into the Dread Doctors. The Pathologist holds him while the Surgeon drills a lobotomy into his skull. Silver lids appear over Donovan's eyes. He is later seen unharmed when Scott tracks him down and subdues him. Donovan is re-imprisoned at the station. He experiences head pains, the silver lids over his eyes appearing now and then. In "Condition Terminal", during Tracy's attack on the station, the Doctors appear, coming for Donovan, and abduct him. Donovan is seen later in the Doctors' lair, struggling, strapped to an exam table. They take turns examining him; the Surgeon declares Donovan "looks promising". The Geneticist, performs one last procedure, tearing out Donovan's teeth, allowing new wendigo teeth to grow in place. Donovan is later visited by Theo Raeken. He mocks, and chews Donovan out, assessing his aptitude test to be a Deputy, saying he now can't be one like his dad. Theo tells him that he instead has something else now: power. He knows Donovan wants to go after Stilinski and make him suffer, but advises him that "real pain is emotional pain". If he wants to get back at Stilinski then he should go after someone he loves, imploring he go after Stiles. Donovan takes this to heart. Later at night, at the high school, Donovan is free, and comes upon Stiles as the teenager is fixing his Jeep. In the struggle, he mauls Stiles' shoulder but Stiles fights back, but drops his cellphone. Donovan picks up the phone, then chases Stiles throughout the school, into the library. As Stiles hides, Donovan trash-talk and taunts him. He tells him Stilinski was once partners with Donovan's father when he was a deputy. His father got caught in a shootout that severed his T-9 vertebrae that left him paralyzed while Stilinski was calling for backup. Donovan rants it is Stilinski's fault for being a coward, for his dad being in a wheelchair. He eventually catches Stiles, then chases him up a construction scaffolding. He grabs Stiles' leg, then taunts him he is not going to kill him, he is going to eat his legs away shapeshifting to his wendigo shape. Stiles, out of desperation, pulls out a ring that supports part of the construction; materials fall on top of Donovan. As Donovan falls backwards, he is impaled upon a metal bar through the chest, and dies. His corpse is taken by Parrish to the Nemeton. In "The Last Chimera", Donovan's body as well as those of Lucas, Beth and the unnamed Chimera girl were retrieved by the cops once they were shown the location of the Nemeton by Hayden. In "Damnatio Memoriae", Donovan's death was discussed with Stiles and his dad with the Sheriff having figured out Theo's version of how Donovan died was true, except that Theo wasn't the one who killed Donovan; it was Stiles who acted in self-defence. In "Codominance", Donovan's death was discussed between Stiles and Scott with the latter learning the truth of how Donovan was killed, that it was self-defence rather than murder as Theo had claimed. Donovan was converted into a Chimera by the Dread Doctors because he'd had an allogeneic skin graft. His Chimera makeup consisted of a lamprey and a wendigo. He had the eyes and fangs of a wendigo and could manifest lamprey mouths anywhere on his body.
Tracy Stewart	Kelsey Chow	5	Chimera
Tracy Stewart is a senior at Beacon Hills High in Season 5. After being experimented upon by the Dread Doctors, Tracy is a werewolf/Kanima Chimera. Tracy is killed by the Dread Doctors when she has declared failure. In Season 5B, Tracy having been revived by Theo Raeken, is a member of his Chimera Pack. In "Parasomnia", Tracy first appears in counseling with Natalie Martin. She nervously tells Natalie she is having night terrors, trouble sleeping. She recalls ravens appearing at her bedroom window, her sealed skylight is open, and she is hallucinating the Dread Doctors. Lydia notices Tracy's symptoms, she and Parrish suspecting Tracy could be newly supernatural. They note the skylight isn't sealed and the dead ravens all over her roof. Her father, Mr. Stewart, has the skylight boarded up, tells Tracy he has to meet a client and he'll be back soon. Later on, Tracy starts sleepwalking. She walks into the Dread Doctors' lair where the Doctors appear. Terrified, shedding a tear, Tracy tells herself she is sleeping. The Surgeon responds to her she is "awakening". The other two para-scientists restrain her, while the Surgeon injects her with a chemical. Tracy roars, manifesting the claws and the fangs of a werewolf. In "Dreamcatchers", Tracy appears, feral, out of her mind, outside a prison transport van after veering it off the road. Inside is her father and his client, Donovan Donati. She attacks the van, wounding the two guards, then comes out facing her father in her shapeshifted state and savages him to death. Scott's Pack learn of Tracy, her night terrors and attempt to track her down, thinking she could be a new werewolf. Parrish learns later in the night Tracy was at the hospital, killing her psychiatrist. Tracy appears in Ken Yukimura's sophomore history class. Scott and his Pack come for her, but she hallucinates them as the Doctors. Tracy collapses, puking up mercury. Scott, Stiles and Malia bring her to Deaton for treatment while Kira and Lydia search her house. Tracy comes to, suddenly manifesting a Kanima's tail and hide, and escapes the clinic, even bypassing a mountain ash barrier. Lydia deduces Tracy is still in a night terror, sleepwalking, and is targeting people who tried to help her, including Natalie Martin. Tracy appears at the Sheriff's station having tracked down Natalie, wall crawling on the roof, paralyzing the deputies, about to savage Natalie. She wounds Lydia, but Kira fights her off, severing her reptilian tail. Malia arrives and takes Tracy on. The werecoyote eventually subdues Tracy. Malia snaps Tracy out of her night terror, telling her she is awake and not dreaming. Tracy, fully aware and conscious, confusedly asks "What's happening to me?". Just then the Dread Doctors appear, and euthanize Tracy, killing her. In "Status Asthmaticus", Theo Raeken injects Tracy's corpse with a restorative liquid, and she is brought back to life (along with Hayden, Corey, and Josh Diaz). Theo declares to the four other Chimeras he is their Alpha and they are his Pack. Tracy and the others obediently follow Theo. In Season 5B, Tracy completely pledges her loyalty to Theo, becoming his right hand whilst the other three just follow him out of fear. In "Damnatio Memoriae", Tracy disaffectedly murders the surviving witness to her savaging Donovan's prison transport and remorselessly assaults Scott and Stiles under Theo's guidance. Tracy joins Theo in tracking down the Beast of Gévaudan so for Theo to steal the Beast's power. She remains emotionless when Theo tells her the Beast's body count back in the 18th century was closer to 500 instead of the reported 113 as stated online. In "Amplification", during the attempted extraction of Lydia from Eichen House, the Chimera Pack is all beat by Parrish as the hellhound. After Corey and Josh are both badly hurt, Tracy simply leaves them to find and recover Lydia for Theo, slaughtering guards in her way. Right after both Packs exit Eichen House, Tracy appears and attacks Parrish and takes an injured, overpowered Lydia hostage. She rebukes Scott's warning that Lydia's powers right now are dangerous, warning them none of them are getting in her way, but she is tazered from behind by an angry Natalie Martin. In "The Beast of Beacon Hills", Tracy supports Theo's order that Josh wear the Dread Doctors' mask due to its electromagnetic properties. She remains disaffected when Theo kills Josh to take his power simply so Theo can wear the Mask himself. When Theo asks Tracy for her, she talks of Josh disdainfully, noting that he was "small and inexperienced." Tracy prevents Malia and Braden from participating in final showdown against the Beast by breaking their mountain ash seal allowing the Desert Wolf to enter the McCall house and leaves them to die at the assassin's hands. In "Apotheosis, Tracy assists Theo in regrouping at the Doctor's operating theatre after he is injured by the Beast. Tracy, worried about him, inspects his injuries. Theo reassures Tracy he is fine, then seduces her. Tracy falls for his advances, lets her guard down and they make out. Tracy reminds him she can't take his pain. Theo softly reassures her there's something else she can do, give him her power. He then forcefully impales her in the back with his claws. Tracy roars in protest and pain, then tries to fight back against her treacherous savior, but Theo buries deep into her. With Theo taking her power, Tracy dies again. Tracy is at first delicate, shy and faint-hearted. After being resurrected, she loses her humanity, her morals, being cold, aggressive, dispassionate and emotionless, having no regard for human welfare and revels in her lethal tendencies, but is unerringly loyal and affectionate towards Theo. Tracy became a Chimera for the Doctors due to her having an allogeneic skin graft. Tracy's Chimera makeup consists of both a werewolf and a Kanima. Her natural shapeshifter abilities, super-strength, super-speed, healing are the amongst the strongest of the Chimeras. She displays the claws, fangs of a werewolf, and a Kanima's hide, wall crawling and ability to produce a paralytic toxin.
Corey Bryant	Michael Johnston	5, 6	Chimera
Corey Bryant is a sophomore at Beacon Hills High first appearing in Season 5 and is openly gay. Corey is fun-loving, charming and has a sweet, amicable nature, but is rather faint-hearted and comes from a neglectful household. In Season 5, Corey is a Chimera created by the Dread Doctors, with abilities of super-strength and healing. Corey has traits of the chameleon as he can use camouflage as well as make others become invisible through touch. After being killed by the Doctors then resurrected, Corey is a member of Theo Raeken's Pack in Season 5B. He later becomes the boyfriend of Mason. Corey is first seen in Season 5 episode 4 "Condition Terminal". Corey had been making out with his boyfriend Lucas. He noticed Lucas seemed like a whole different person. Corey then felt a sudden sting on his arm, and saw Lucas' eyes turn completely black, to his horror. Lucas left, telling Corey he'll see him at their favourite nightclub, Sinema. Corey was left writhing, screaming in "the worst pain of (his) life" and the wounded flesh on his left arm necrotized. Corey is forwarded to the hospital, still screaming. Melissa McCall and Geyer attempt to help him, pumping him full of morphine to no effect. Melissa calls Scott and Kira to the hospital, and Scott siphons his heavy pain, and Corey stops screaming. Though confused, Corey tells Scott and Kira that Lucas stung him, his witnessing his features, and where to find Lucas. In "Strange Frequencies", a fully recovered but unnerved Corey returns to school. He runs into Mason Hewitt at the library. He asks Mason if he'd seen Lucas at Sinema, if he'd said anything about Corey. Mason gives him his apologies over Lucas but said that he'd told the cops "everything". Corey thanks him, but leaves up a book he'd been reading titled "Miraculous Healing". Corey is later seen drinking at Sinema, but Mason asks him about his arm that had been melted off, but it had healed. Corey is distressed and confused over the bizarre things happening to him, but Mason identifies him as a Chimera. Corey is then enlightened on his situation, and brought to Scott's Pack afterwards. In "Ouroboros", Corey attempts to help locate an abducted Liam and Hayden Romero, reading the book "the Dread Doctors" to recover his altered memories, but a desperate, overwhelmed Scott instead performs a mind-meld to extract his memories himself. Corey is immensely disturbed by the process afterwards, but Scott rebuffs him saying he'll be fine. After Scott, Malia and Mason leave, Corey is just about to take off, being unwilling to help out now, because "a werewolf wired his way into (his) brain with his claws". Theo attempts to calm Corey down, and convinces him to try and remember something else. Corey, after some pressing, remembers an abandoned house which the Dread Doctors used to house the stored Chimeras, where Theo manages to 'find' Liam and Hayden. In "Lies of Omission", Corey eventually relaxes and adapts to his new identity with Mason's help, showing off super-strength in the school's gym to the latter. Unfortunately, he vomits up mercury, meaning he is not a success for the Dread Doctors. He is taken to the hospital, but escapes causing a ruckus as well as displaying camouflage. The Surgeon however still pinpoints his location and kills him. In "Status Asthmaticus", Theo brings Corey, Hayden, Tracy Stewart and Josh Diaz back to life using a restorative serum, courtesy of the Doctors. All four teens instinctively follow Theo when he declaring they all belong to him. In Season 5B, Corey goes back to school, with he and Theo having covered up his death. Though traumatized over having been killed, then brought back to life and feeling in debt to Theo, Corey also wants to return to normalcy in "Damnatio Memoriae". He hits it off with Mason, asking him out on a date. Theo however corners him and smooth-talks his way up to Corey, then subtly threatens the younger boy that he is going to follow Theo's orders because of his fear of dying again. Though unsettled, Corey timidly complies. In "Codominance", Corey continues to pursue Mason, but Mason tells Corey he is with Theo, "the bad guys". Corey reasons with Mason that there are no bad guys or good guys anymore. It is whether you are dead or alive and he wants to be alive. He asks Mason does he want to be alive with him. Mason falls for Corey's charm and the two boys kiss. Corey maintains his loyalty to Theo but he and Mason carry on their romance and trade information during the tension between the two Packs. In "Amplification", Corey goes as part of Theo's Pack to extract Lydia from Eichen House. When Parrish as the hellhound arrives to protect the banshee, Theo orders his Chimeras to take Parrish to Corey's disbelief and terror due to the hellhound's fire. Theo demands he obey because he'll heal. Corey complies before the hellhound strikes Josh, but he is set completely aflame badly burned, then dying. Josh helps him to safety and Malia saves his life by taking his pain so Corey can heal from his burns. In "A Credible Threat", Corey's burns slowly heal. He has had enough of the dangers everywhere and decides to leave Beacon Hills. Mason attempts to convince him to stay, assuring him he is healing and reasoning that normal people like Mason need people with special abilities like Corey to survive. Corey replies that Mason is smart and it is the smart ones who survive. However, when Mason uncovers the Dread Doctors' method of triggering the Beast's transformations with super strong radio frequencies and discovers their latest method to trigger its transformation is around the corner, Corey, having grown fond of and feeling protective of Mason, ultimately changes his mind. He assists Mason in following up on the clue to the Beast's host's identity, a size 10 shoe with Parrish's blood. He has himself and Mason camouflaged when they're almost caught, but Corey is disturbed, feeling something off about Mason, and is dreadfully fearful that Mason is the host. When Scott and Liam determine Mason is the Beast's host, Corey comes out of hiding and camouflages both he and Mason fearful for Mason's life. Corey attempts to convince Mason he is the host because he felt something really wrong back when he flinched away from him, but that every other second he is with Mason is completely and totally right. Corey panics when the Dread Doctors adduct Mason and goes back to Scott's Pack for help. In "Apotheosis", Corey remains camouflaged as the Pack successfully saves him, to his awe and content, and embraces a fully alive and well Mason. After the two of them witness Theo being banished to Hell for his crimes, Corey and Mason carry on with their lives. In the season 6 premiere, Corey uses his camouflage in order to "borrow" Mr. Douglas' compass so Liam and Mason can investigate strange readings. In "Superposition", Corey hides in the school as the Ghost Riders approach, warning Mason of their arrival as they he secretly watches while the Ghost Riders make someone vanish. In "Sundowning", Corey can't help thinking they forgot something as he prepares for the worst. When the Ghost Riders arrive at Scott's house, Corey and Gwen are the only ones who can see them. While camouflaged, he grabs a Ghost Rider as it passes, making them both visible to everyone. In "Relics", after he finds Liam in the locker room, Corey suggests that they leave as the night is over. Liam announces that he plans on catching one of the Ghost Riders but Corey is in disbelief. In "Heartless, Corey helps Scott and Mason in their plan to catch a Ghost Rider. While Scott and Liam attempt to question the Ghost Rider they captured, Mason reveals that he can still see Corey even though he is camouflaged due to light refracting off him. When Corey finds Garrett Douglas in the woods, he asks what he is doing there. Garrett says something he has wanted to do for a long time. Then he wraps the Ghost Rider's whip around Corey's neck until he disappears in a puff of green smoke. In "Riders on the Storm", Liam figures Corey's camouflage allows him to live in the real world and the phantom world. Corey is found to be attached to many wires in the radio room of the phantom train station and acts as the link to merging the Ghost Riders' limbo with Beacon Hills. Once Liam, Hayden and Mason take out the wires, the townspeople are returned and remnants of the Ghost Riders disappear. Corey is taken to the hospital where Melissa uses the 9 herbs to heal his injuries.
Josh Diaz	Henry Zaga	5	Chimera
Josh Diaz is a junior at Beacon Hills High appearing in Season 5. He is an electric eel Chimera altered by the Dread Doctors and a member of Theo Raeken's Chimera Pack in Season 5B. Josh is portrayed as being a thrill seeker, but shows that he cares for those he is close to. Josh first appears in "Required Reading" at the night club Sinema, then on the high school's lacrosse field. As an electric eel Chimera, Josh was responsible for the electricity outages at the school, then at the hospital feeding on the electrical wires with his fangs. Josh, in a feral state, attacks Stiles on the hospital roof, but Theo engages him. Theo manages to overpower Josh, and tears out Josh's throat, killing him. In "Status Asthmaticus", Josh is revived by Theo via a restorative serum courtesy of the Dread Doctors. Theo declares to Josh, as well as Hayden, Corey and Tracy Stewart that Theo is their Alpha, and they all belong to him. Along with the others, Josh follows Theo. In "Damnatio Memoriae", while at Sinema, Josh complains to Theo that he can't get drunk or high anymore. Theo consoles him that he can't because his body now heals too fast. To lure Josh under his influence, Theo plays on Josh urge for thrills and instead shows Josh how to use electricity, feeding Josh's electricity manipulation, having him shapeshift which Josh finds exhilarating, becoming power-drunk. Like Tracy, Josh falls for Theo's thrall losing touch with his ability to feel empathy, becoming more violent as seen when Theo sends them out to test their abilities against Scott. In the Chimera Pack, Josh joins Tracy in becoming Theo's muscle. In "Amplification", Josh along with the rest of Theo's Pack, infiltrate Eichen House to abduct Lydia under Theo's orders. Parrish, as a hellhound, appears and the Chimeras engage him to no use. When Corey is severely burnt by Parrish, Josh displays worry for the younger boy. He stops Malia from touching Kira because of her Thunder Kitsune power overload, saying he can feel the voltage from her. He makes a deal with Malia that he will siphon Kira's excess electricity and Malia will absorb Corey's pain so he can heal. When Hayden and Mason turn off the electric grid allowing the Packs to leave, the four leave without conflict. In "The Beast of Beacon Hills", Josh, due to his electrical abilities, is chosen by Theo to put on the Mask with him being compatible with its electromagnetic properties. He ultimately refuses due to not being interested in the Beast's identity, fed up with being used, telling Theo to do it himself. He decides to leave. Right after Deucalion shows him how to steal power from another, Theo murders Josh, taking his electrical powers in the process to use the mask. Josh has enormous front teeth, werewolf claws, the ability of electricity manipulation and his eyes glow purple. Josh's Chimera makeup consists of a werewolf as well as an electric eel giving him electrical based powers.
Corinne "The Desert Wolf"	Marisol Nichols	5	Werecoyote
Corinne also known as "The Desert Wolf" is a werecoyote, a professional killer and Malia's biological mother. Corinne was a lover of Peter Hale and eventually bore his child (Malia). When her daughter was born, Peter's older sister, Talia Hale snatched Malia from the assassin before she was even given a name and was put up for adoption. When Malia was nine years old, the Desert Wolf attempted to kill her. She opened fire upon the car she was in, along with her adoptive mother and sister; the car veered off the road, into the Beacon Hills Preserve and wound up in the ravine. Evelyn and the younger girl were killed but unbeknownst to her mother, Malia survived. The Desert Wolf eventually became the quarry of Braeden, the mercenary. In Season 5 "Ouroboros", the Desert Wolf tracks down and corners Deaton in Russia, where he was investigating an old lair used by the Dread Doctors. She kills his guide and holds him at gunpoint. The assassin informs him over a rumour she heard that her daughter is alive, and interrogates him if he knows anything. Deaton lies he does not know anything about any daughter of hers. The Desert Wolf replies that if he is wrong then she'll just have to "kill (Malia) again". The Desert Wolf takes Deaton hostage and makes her way to Beacon Hills. In "The Sword and the Spirit", Corinne holds Deaton at an abandoned base in the industrial estate and waits for Malia to arrive. Her daughter, Braeden and Theo arrive at the scene, and Theo makes his move knocking out Braeden and shooting Malia non-fatally, having made a deal with the Desert Wolf. Theo then leaves Malia for Corrine who then appears handing Theo the garuda talons appropriated from Deaton. After Theo leaves, Corinne malevolently greets her daughter. She rants that she lost part of her werecoyote power - super-strength, speed and healing - to Malia once she gave birth, all while torturing her daughter. She intends to kill Malia to regain her lost power. Corinne moves in to make the killing blow, but Deaton gets free of his gag and yells out to the assassin that she can't get her lost power back from Malia except whilst on a full moon, otherwise she gets nothing, stalling her. A banshee Scream from Lydia distracts the assassin further and Malia recovers from her wound enough to take on Corinne. Mother and daughter ferociously face off, both shapeshifted. The fight is, however, interrupted by the Beast of Gévaudan and all parties leave. In "A Credible Threat", Corinne stalks Malia during the Pack's plan to prevent the Beast from appearing at the lacrosse game. Malia faces off with her, the full moon around the corner. She is amused by Malia's attempt at heroism and identifies Stiles as someone Malia really cares about and slips away. The full moon closing in, the Desert Wolf stalks Scott's Pack to locate Malia making her move to strike. Corinne overhears Lydia talk to Malia over the phone: Malia is at the McCall house and protected by a mountain ash seal. The assassin heads to Scott's house and she recruits Tracy Stewart employing the Chimera to break the barrier, allowing Corinne to infiltrate the McCall house and faces off against Malia and Braeden, including a shootout between her and Braeden whilst Malia takes cover. Corinne remorselessly gloats and taunts Malia, telling her daughter nothing with dissuade her from killing Malia, from reclaiming what Malia 'stole' from her. She recalls, years ago, Talia Hale's persistent attempts trying to make her realize the gift of childbirth whilst she was pregnant with Malia, and her seeing the beauty of a werecoyote passing part of her power to her child. She spitefully declares bearing a baby "a parasite" and Malia gaining part of her power "theft". Malia causes a distraction, allowing Corinne to shoot Braeden. Stiles arrives at the house and inadvertently gets caught up in the fray. Corinne manages to catch Malia at gunpoint. She gleefully shoots Malia three times before moving in, claws extended. She impales a weakened Malia, but Malia guts her back - her own claws outfitted with the garuda talons, provided to her by Stiles, turning the tables. Malia absorbs Corrine's remaining power instead. The Desert Wolf staggers back just as a recovered Braeden knocks her unconscious. Afterwards, Corrine is imprisoned at Eichen House. Corrine is ruthless as an assassin, arrogant, sadistic, cruel, selfish and remorseless over her actions. Like Malia, Corrine is a werecoyote and she sports the supernatural blue eyes of a canine shapeshifter who has taken lives. Her supernatural powers, super-strength, shapeshifting, super-senses and healing are not on par with a normal werecreature, due to having given birth to Malia. Corrine is later fully sapped of her power by Malia.
Sebastien Valet	Gilles Marini	5	Werewolf
Sebastien Valet, "La Bête du Gévaudan", or "the Beast", is the most notorious, fearsome and famous werewolf in history. Sebastien was a super-powered, beastly werewolf who terrorized the French province of Gévaudan in the 18th century, killing scores of people until he was finally killed by his sister, Marie-Jeanne Argent in 1767. In the present, Sebastien is gradually resurrected by the Dread Doctors by binding his essence to a vessel, Mason Hewitt. Sebastien was born an antisocial and unrepentant sociopath. In 1760, Sebastien was a soldier alongside his faithful companion Marcel, and fought against the British in the French territory of Canada. One rainy night, whilst he and Marcel were evading the British, Sebastien fell face-forward into a puddle and unintentionally drank from it. The water-filled hole was a wolf's footprint. Sebastien, as a result of his disturbed persona, became a demonic werewolf. Overtime, he started killing, driven to simply kill whoever and whatever came across his path. His friend Marcel also became aware of his carnage, but steadfastly remained his ally, covering for him. Soon Sebastien was mentioned with fear throughout Gévaudan, becoming known as "La Bête". In 1764, Sebastien and Marcel return to town entering the local pub where all are talking the Beast and he reunites with his sister, Marie-Jeanne. Sebastien urges his sister to lead the hunting party for La Bête, which she eventually accepts after a little boy, the innkeeper's son is found dead by a man, Henri. Later at night, Marie-Jeanne's hunting party is slaughtered by La Bête one by one, but Marie-Jeanne is saved by Henri via a mountain ash barrier. Later on, Marie-Jeanne proposes a toast to honor the dead. Sebastien plays along, but he and Marcel uncover the spiked wolfsbane in Marie-Jeanne's mead. Sebastien splutters and involuntarily starts to shapeshift with eyes glowing blue. Sebastien unperturbedly waits as his sister walks over to him, having discovered his secret. A tearful Marie-Jeanne tells him he is a monster. Sebastien responds he is a beast, "the Beast" to his sister, that he'll kill anyone who crosses his path, because it is what he is. Sebastien gives his sister a kiss to the forehead, tells her she won't go up against him because they're family. Three years later, Marie-Jeanne tracks her brother down. Sebastien gives chase, attempts to kill her in his werewolf shape, but Marie-Jeanne reveals the pike hidden underneath the snow and impales the Beast. Back in human form, Sebastien is unconcerned with his injury, confident he'll heal from it and he will be remembered by history, that everyone will speak his name. Marie-Jeanne responds no one will remember his name. Affronted, Sebastien realizes she intends to invoke "Damnatio Memoriae" on his name. Suddenly, Sebastien realizes he is not healing but he is dying. Marie-Jeanne reveals the pike is mystical, was forged with their blood. In the Beast's dying moments, Marie-Jeanne tells Sebastien everyone will remember him, "but only as a Beast." Sebastien dies. During the Dread Doctors' reign on Beacon Hills, they work on perfecting the process of reviving Sebastien Valet. Using the teenage chimera Mason as a host, they produce an engineered version of Sebastien's demonic Wolf form which Mason sporadically transforms into under the Doctors' guidance as it kills its way throughout Beacon County. The Beast gradually remembers its former incarnation, nurtured by the Dread Doctors' actions. In "The Beast of Beacon Hills", the process fully completes, with Mason being enveloped by Sebastien's essence, with Sebastien himself completely reviving once he shapeshifts back from the Beast shape. Mason Hewitt now only exists as memory within Sebastien's form. In "Apotheosis", the resurrected Beast of Gévaudan accesses Mason's memory and uses his vessel's persona to adapt to the 21st century. Having killed the Dread Doctors, but aware the Surgeon is still partially alive, he looks for the surviving para-scientist, becoming aware he took possession of the only weapon that is capable of killing him, the Pike. He finds the Surgeon, whose face is horribly ravaged from his centuries' work but recognizes him as Marcel, his old comrade. Sebastien is disaffected by Marcel's centuries of twisted actions to bring him back, only demanding the location of the Pike. Marcel, in his dying moments, tells him the Argents took the weapon. Sebastien wreaks havoc throughout Beacon Hills searching for the Argents and the Pike, threatening Stilinski at the Sheriff's station, mauling both Lydia and Hayden, fighting ferociously against Parrish, the Argents and disabling Theo Raeken attempting to steal his power in the process. Sebastien finally comes face to face with Liam and Scott, and politely asks the Pike back. The Alpha and Beta state they just want Mason. Sebastien states he does not know where to begin, but states that Mason is gone anyway. The two werewolves take Sebastien on with all their might: Sebastien easily overpowers them whilst mocking them for not fighting with a killer instinct. He is about to kill Scott, but he unintentionally taps into Scott's memories, seeing images of Allison Argent. Sebastien confusedly hesitates, mistaking Allison for his sister Marie-Jeanne, allowing Scott escapes his grip. Right then, Lydia and Kira arrive: Sebastien shifts into the Beast then moves to kill them. Lydia Screams out Mason's name in her banshee voice, powerful sound waves striking the Beast. The power reverses the process, allowing Mason to separate from the Beast. Having been stripped of a physical body, the Beast now only exists as a shadow. Parrish arrives, catching and holding the Beast's essence captive. Scott then takes the opportunity to take the sword/cane and spears the Beast's spirit with the weapon, the shadow dissipating vanquishing Sebastien Valet, the Beast of Gévaudan once again. Having killed close to 500 people, Sebastien Valet is a born monster, arrogant, diabolical, vain and boasting of his immense power, entitled in being the "famous and feared Beast of Gévaudan". He has no emotions, no regard for any human life, not even those of his sister and Marcel and kills for the sake of killing, even his family, all so to carve himself in history. Sebastien's werewolf ability is the most powerful seen so far, surpassing even Peter's Alpha capabilities, Deucalion's as the Alpha Pack leader and those of Parrish, a hellhound: his strength, speed, durability and healing all extremely heightened, and completely indestructible due to being a sociopath relishing in his carnage. He is fully vulnerable only to the mystical Pike forged by his sister. When Sebastien shapeshifts, he is enveloped in dark energy and his clothes assimilate as part of his transformation.
"The Ghost Riders"	Marti Matulis (The Outlaw); Alexander Ward (The Enforcer); Kevin Ogilvie (The Ranger)	6	Ghost
The Ghost Riders are humanoid horsemen dressed in cowboy hats and other "old west" clothing and are part of the Wild Hunt. They are mentioned a few times in season 5, but first appear in season 6. There are many Ghost Riders but only 3 are named, the Outlaw, the Enforcer and the Ranger. The Ghost Riders tend to take and erase people who have seen them. The process can be instant or gradual as the memory seems to disappear for different people at different times. In the season 6 premiere, they take a couple whose son is left behind. The boy is later taken as he saw his parents get taken. The boy and his parents are instantly forgotten. Stiles Stilinski encounters a Ghost Rider at the boy's house. His memory is gradually erased from those who knew him until Lydia Martin is the only one who still remembers him. Stiles is taken by the Ghost Riders as Lydia watches on. The Ghost Riders take people by shooting them with guns. They also use whips and ropes to grab and erase their victims. The whip carries a supernatural toxin that can kill if the victim is struck but not taken. Victims disappear in a puff of green smoke. The Ghost Riders deliver their victims to what appears to be a train station that only the Ghost Riders can enter and exit safely. They apparently don't erase banshees despite their ability to see them, which is evident in "Ghosted" when the Ghost Riders erased the residents of Canaan but leave behind a banshee named Lenore. Lydia speculates that this may be because the Wild Hunt is connected to the old Irish legend of Morrigan, a mythical Irish figure that Lydia saya was a banshee. She also figures out that once the Ghost Riders left Canaan, their victims became Ghost Riders. Capturing a Ghost Rider is possible as Scott, Mason and Corey constructed a special cage that shielded it from electric currents to prevent the Ghost Rider from leaving once he enters the cage. They then surrounded it with mountain ash as a precaution. Killing a Ghost Rider wasn't deemed possible until Garrett Douglas killed the Outlaw in "Heartless". This is due to the fact that he was infused with their power. In "Memory Found", Liam and Theo battle Ghost Riders and were able to kill a few of them with a bone saw and their own guns. In "Riders on the Storm", after Scott diverts the phantom train, the Ghost Riders holster their weapons and start to leave. Garrett Douglas yells for them to come back, claiming that he is their master. The Ghost Riders turn around and surround him. Peter Hale points out to Garrett that the Ghost Riders have no leader. The Ghost Riders turn Garrett into one of their own and they leave Beacon Hills via lightning.
Garrett Douglas	Pete Ploszek	5, 6	Löwenmensch
Garrett Douglas is an Alpha löwenmensch (werelion) who works as a teacher at Beacon Hills High School in season 6. He was a Hauptmann (German for Captain) in the Nazi Regume during World War II. In 1943, Garrett was part of the Ahnenerbre, Heinrich Himmler's personal project to use the occult to win World War II. The Nazi captain proposed the use of the Ghost Riders as soldiers in their regume. However, Garrett intended to take the Ghost Riders for his own purpose. In the Ruhr Valley in Germany, Garrett and some soldiers attempted to penetrate the rift to the Ghost Riders' limbo. However, the Ghost Riders attack and the Germans are easily beaten. Garrett survived but is wounded by one of their whips. Still wanting to control the Ghost Riders, Garrett sought help from the Dread Doctors. Instead, they captured him and encased him in a large tube filled with liquid and used the healing properties in his blood to prolong their lives. The bleeding from the whip lash "infected the water" and mixed with the fluid from the tube. The combination made Garrett stronger. He was soaking it in, absorbing the power for 70 years. Throughout his captivity, he was known as "Der Soldat" by the Dread Doctors. At the end of season 5, he escapes their lair and resumed his efforts to use the Ghost Riders. Garrett is first seen in season 5A "Strange Frequencies" when Liam Dunbar and Hayden Romero are held captive by the Dread Doctors. Liam catches a glimpse of him in the tube while looking around the Dread Doctors' lair. In "Ouroboros" and "Lies of Omission", the Doctors use the liquid from Garrett's tube to rejuvenate their health. In "Status Asthmaticus", Theo Raeken uses the liquid containing Garrett's blood to revive Tracy Stewart, Corey Bryant, Josh Diaz and Hayden. In "The Beast of Beacon Hills", Theo shows Scott McCall and Liam "Der Soldat" and they find Mason Hewitt attached to his tube. In the season 5 finale "Apotheosis", after the deaths of the Dread Doctors and the Beast of Gévaudan, Garrett breaks out of the tube and escapes. In the season 6 premiere "Memory Lost", Garrett is teaching a class where students including Hayden and Corey are smitten by his good looks. Liam, Mason and Corey steal his compass to track down strange magnetic readings. In "Superposition", Garrett catches Scott trying to open a locker that isn't his and reminds him that it is against the rules opening someone else's locker. In "Sundowning", it is revealed Garrett's health is bad as a result of his time in the tube when he suffers a coughing fit while teaching a class. Because of this, he must inhale helium which eases his cough. He is later revealed to be the one responsible for a series of murders where he kills his victims and eats the pineal gland, which is said to house the soul as he is seen killing a janitor and eating his pineal gland. In "Ghosted", Garrett listens in as Liam and Hayden make their next move against the Ghost Riders. He decides to join them as they plan to trap one, assisting the two teens as they construct their plan. In "Heartless", Garrett shows up at the site where a Ghost Rider is held in the cage, non one is around but Theo and the captured Ghost Rider. He forces Theo to break the mountain ash barrier surrounding the cage. Garrett enters the cage, attacks the Ghost Rider and kills it by taking a bite out of its head and eats its pineal gland, which grants him the power of a Ghost Rider and changes his eye color to emerald. He also steals the Ghost Rider's whip which he uses to erase Corey. In "Blitzkrieg", Garrett's Nazi past is revealed by Theo and part of Garrett's plan is to find the hellhound. Once he locates an unresponsive Jordan Parrish, he erases Argent and Melissa McCall. After awakening Parrish, he commands the hellhound to open the rift, passing through as he does. In "Riders on the Storm", Garrett uses Corey to merge the Ghost Riders' limbo with the real world. He fights Scott and the Pack to complete his plans to create his own personal supernatural army, but Scott diverts the train before it could enter Beacon Hills. When the Ghost Riders start to leave, Garrett attempts to take command of them once more. They surround him and he is turned into a Ghost Rider with a swastika on his arm before he and the Ghost Riders are taken up by the lightning storm.
Gwen	Alisha Boe	6	Human
Gwen is a member of the lacrosse team. She is first seen in season 6A "Sundowning", where she is searching for her sister Phoebe who had been taken by the Ghost Riders. Distraught that no one remembers Phoebe, the only thing Gwen has left of her is a bracelet she wove for her. When Hayden tells her about the Ghost Riders, Gwen does not believe her until she sees a Ghost Rider at a party set up to protect her because she is a target. In "Relics", Gwen still refuses help despite what happened during the party. Hayden realises that Gwen wants to be taken because she feels it wouldn't matter if she disappeared. When the Ghost Riders arrive during a lacrosse game, Scott and Liam protect Gwen but she allows the Ghost Riders to take her and she disappears. In "Radio Silence", Gwen is brought to the train station where Stiles and the others are being held and is reunited with her sister.
