= List of Teen Wolf (2011 TV series) characters =

Early cast from left to right: Lydia, Jackson, Stiles, Allison, Scott, and Derek.

Later cast from left to right: Malia, Stiles, Lydia, Scott, Kira, Derek, and Liam.

Teen Wolf is an American television series that aired on MTV. The series premiered on Sunday, June 5, 2011, following the 2011 MTV Movie Awards. Teen Wolf is a supernatural drama series that follows Scott McCall (Tyler Posey), a high school student and social outcast who is bitten by a werewolf. He tries to maintain a normal life while hiding his secret and dealing with supernatural dangers that plague the town of Beacon Hills. He is aided by his best friend, Stiles Stilinski (Dylan O'Brien), and mysterious werewolf Derek Hale (Tyler Hoechlin).

Casting announcements were made in December, 2010, with the rest of the main cast being Crystal Reed, Holland Roden and Colton Haynes playing Allison Argent, Lydia Martin and Jackson Whittemore respectively. Haynes left the series after the second season to work on Arrow. He returned in the second part of the sixth season as a guest star. Reed followed, leaving after the third season to pursue other projects. She returned to guest star in the second part of Season 5 and played one of Allison's ancestors. Arden Cho, Shelley Hennig, and Dylan Sprayberry joined the cast for Seasons 4 and 5. Tyler Hoechlin left the series after the fourth season. Hoechlin later returned to the show in the second part of the sixth season in a guest capacity. On April 11, 2016, Arden Cho announced that she would not be returning for Season 6. After appearing in a recurring capacity in the first five seasons, Linden Ashby, Melissa Ponzio and JR Bourne were all upgraded to series regulars for the final season, and Dylan O'Brien got moved to a guest character due to his real life accident.

In February 2022, Paramount+ confirmed that the revival film's cast will consist of Tyler Posey, Holland Roden, Crystal Reed, Colton Haynes, Linden Ashby, Melissa Ponzio, J.R. Bourne, Shelley Hennig, Dylan Sprayberry, Orny Adams, Seth Gilliam and Ryan Kelley. In May 2022, Tyler Hoechlin was confirmed to be cast in the film.

== Overview ==
Legend
= Main cast (credited)
= Starring (starring cast in film)
= Recurring cast (actor appears in three or more episodes that season)
= Guest cast (actor appears in two or fewer episodes that season)

Character	Portrayed by	Seasons						Teen Wolf: The Movie
Character	Portrayed by	1	2	3	4	5	6	Teen Wolf: The Movie
Main characters
Scott McCall	Tyler Posey	Main	Main	Main	Main	Main	Main	Starring
Allison Argent	Crystal Reed	Main	Main	Main		Guest (Note: In season five Reed makes a guest appearance as Marie-Jeanne Valet.)		Starring
Stiles Stilinski	Dylan O'Brien	Main (Note: O'Brien is credited as a regular up to 6x10, and after that he is credited as a guest in 6x11 and 6x20.)	Main	Main	Main	Main	Main	
The Nogitsune (Note: Aaron Hendry plays the mummified version of the character during the third and sixth seasons.)	Dylan O'Brien			Main (Note: During 3x17 and 3x20 the Nogitsune appears in the same body as Stiles. In 3x19 and 3x21 the character is retracted alone, while the Stiles character does not appear.)			Guest	
Derek Hale	Tyler Hoechlin	Main	Main	Main	Main		Guest	Starring
Lydia Martin	Holland Roden	Main	Main	Main	Main	Main	Main	Starring
Jackson Whittemore	Colton Haynes	Main	Main				Guest	Starring
Malia Tate	Shelley Hennig			Recurring	Main	Main	Main	Starring
Kira Yukimura	Arden Cho			Recurring (Note: Arden Cho is credited as a recurrent this season, but as Noshiko she only appears in 3x21.)	Main	Main		
Liam Dunbar	Dylan Sprayberry				Recurring	Main	Main	Starring
Sheriff Noah Stilinski	Linden Ashby	Recurring	Recurring	Recurring	Recurring	Recurring	Main	Starring
Melissa McCall	Melissa Ponzio	Recurring	Recurring	Recurring	Recurring	Recurring	Main	Starring
Chris Argent	JR Bourne	Recurring	Recurring	Recurring	Recurring	Recurring	Main	Starring
Also starring (Note: Actors listed in the film's opening credits.)
Peter Hale	Ian Bohen	Recurring	Recurring	Recurring	Recurring		Recurring	Starring
Jordan Parrish	Ryan Kelley			Recurring	Recurring	Recurring	Recurring	Starring
Alan Deaton	Seth Gilliam	Recurring	Recurring	Recurring	Recurring	Recurring	Guest	Starring
Bobby Finstock	Orny Adams	Recurring	Recurring	Recurring	Recurring	Guest	Recurring	Starring
Mason Hewitt	Khylin Rhambo				Recurring	Recurring	Recurring	Starring
The Nogitsune	Aaron Hendry (Note: Hendry also portrays the recurring character Brunski during the third and fourth seasons.)			Recurring			Guest	Starring
Eli Hale	Vince Mattis							Starring
Hikari Zhang	Amy Workman							Starring

== Main characters ==
=== Scott McCall ===
Character	Portrayer	Season appearances		Supernatural classification
Character	Portrayer	Starring	Recurring/Guest	Supernatural classification
Scott McCall	Tyler Posey (teen); Steele Gagnon (child)	1, 2, 3, 4, 5, 6	—	Werewolf (currently); Berserker (formerly)
Tyler Posey Scott McCall is a True Alpha werewolf, meaning that he did not kill another Alpha werewolf to be an Alpha werewolf, and is the leader of his Pack. In Teen Wolf, Scott is bitten by Peter Hale and turns into a werewolf. He starts a relationship with Allison Argent, a new student whom he later discovers to be part of a werewolf-hunter family. Scott lives with his mother, Melissa McCall, and has a part-time job at Beacon Hills Animal Clinic as an assistant to veterinarian, Alan Deaton, who is his father figure. In season 1, with the help of his best friend, Stiles Stilinski, and fellow werewolf Derek Hale, Scott struggles to control his transformations, balance his high school life with being a new werewolf, and keeping his loved ones safe from the enemies that his new life presents. Scott is optimistic, good-natured, kind-hearted, protective and caring. He has strong morals and ideals. Over the series he exchanges his social awkwardness and naivety for a clear sense of duty in being a burgeoning leader in the supernatural world. Scott sees his new werewolf status as a curse and wishes to find a cure. In the Season 1 finale, Scott and Allison reaffirm their relationship after Allison finds out he's a werewolf and that his lies were to protect her. In season 2, despite being vehemently opposed by Allison's parents, Scott and Allison carry on their relationship in secret. Scott is blackmailed into helping Gerard Argent after the latter threatens Melissa's life by becoming a mole in Derek's Pack. His and Allison's romance then becomes strained due to their conflicting loyalties and later by Allison's new violent behaviour because of Gerard's manipulation of Victoria's suicide. After Gerard's defeat and rescuing Jackson in the Season 2 finale, Allison tearfully apologizes for her actions, and because she needs space, they break up, but they still care for each other afterwards. Melissa also learns and eventually accepts Scott's new life. Scott now sees his werewolf ability as a gift to protect those he cares for. Also, Scott gains a close friend in fellow werewolf Isaac Lahey. In the Season 3 premiere, Scott gets a tattoo of two bands on his upper left arm with Derek's help. He sees the mark as a reward for having let Allison go. In the episode "Currents", Deaton confirms that Scott has the potential to be the rarest form of Alpha, a True Alpha, one who can rise to Alpha status by sheer strength of character and willpower. In "Alpha Pact", Scott temporarily sacrifices himself along with Stiles and Allison in a Druid ritual to save their parents from being sacrificed for the Darach, Jennifer Blake. In "Lunar Ellipse", Scott and Derek defeat the Darach, and Scott fully awakens his True Alpha power. Scott also declares his close friends are his Pack. Scott later learns his father, Rafael is back in town something he and Melissa aren't too happy with, as he'd left the family when Scott was only a toddler. In season 3B, because of his Druid sacrifice, Scott now carries the burden of having a darkness around his heart like a scar. This causes him fear of shifting into his new Alpha form. After some "aid" and words of encouragement from the twins Ethan and Aiden, Scott regains confidence over his shifts and the ability to use the Alpha's Roar. Scott is hurt when Allison and Isaac develop a romantic relationship but eventually comes to terms with it. Scott starts going out with Kira Yukimura after learning she likes him and she is also a Kitsune. When Stiles is possessed by the Nogitsune, Scott is determined to separate the Dark spirit from Stiles without his best friend dying. In "De-Void", Scott and Kira share a kiss after she promises him they'll save Stiles. After being taught by Peter Hale, Scott uses an Alpha's power to meld minds and enter Stiles' mind with Lydia. Because Stiles is in his Pack, Scott uses his Alpha Roar, allowing Stiles to break free of the Nogitsune. In "Insatiable", Allison is fatally stabbed by the Oni. Scott tries to save her life by taking her pain, but he can't. Allison comforts Scott, telling him she is in his arms and she loves him before she dies. Devastated, Scott kisses Allison's forehead. In the Season 3B finale, "The Divine Move", Scott defeats the Nogitsune with an Alpha's Bite, as the Dark Kitsune can't be both a Fox and a Wolf. At Season 3's end, Scott moves on with his life mourning Allison. In season 4, Scott is trying to come to terms with Allison's death. He puts his romance with Kira on hold, but eventually decides to move on and give in to his feelings for her, sharing a deep kiss with her. In "Muted", Scott is forced to Bite Liam Dunbar, to save Liam from falling to his death, transforming Liam into his first true Beta. Scott takes Liam under his wing, helping him adjust to being a werewolf and keeping him safe. Scott vows to stop the Dead Pool and save his friends from death. Upon learning Rafael killed an assassin to save Stiles' life with no way otherwise, Scott contemplates should he resort to killing his opponents in order to stop them. In "Monstrous", Scott saves young Lori Rohr from death and then attempts to kill the assassin out of rage. This action causes Scott to Evolve for the first time, triggering a transformation into a new bestial shape which includes a heavier brow, rippled-like skin, more fangs, his eyes turning completely black with the exception of his Alpha eye color becoming brighter. When the assassin surrenders, Scott stops at the last minute, sparing the man's life. He permanently gains additional fangs afterwards. In "A Promise to the Dead", Scott and Kira are captured by Kate Argent and her Berserker and they are both taken to La Iglesia, where Kate transforms Scott into a new Berserker. In "Smoke & Mirrors" Scott, under Kate's control as a Berserker, attacks his friends. Liam reaches Scott's spirit, and Scott breaks free of the Berserker form. Scott then faces Peter, having figured out the latter's plan to conspire with Kate to have Scott killed. He clashes with his werewolf sire fiercely. Peter goads Scott he'll have to kill him if he wants to beat him. When Peter threatens Liam, Scott Evolves again, gaining new super-strength. He defeats Peter while also sparing him, deciding for good he's an Alpha instead of a monster while declaring that Peter was always the other way around. In season 5A, Scott and his Pack start senior year. Scott plans to get into UC, Davis to become a vet following in Deaton's footsteps. A new Omega werewolf, his grade-school friend Theo Raeken, returns to Beacon Hills wishing to join his Pack which Scott considers. Scott eventually tells Kira he loves her, but is then unnerved by her increasingly bloodthirsty behavior due to her Kitsune Evolution, admitting to Theo he's losing trust in her. During the Dread Doctors' killing spree, to combat the para-scientists, Scott and his Pack read the subliminally coded novel based on the Doctors. It causes Scott to flashback to when he was hospitalised as a child following a severe asthma attack. It's then revealed that as a child, Scott used to own a dog named Roxy who was fatally attacked by another dog which led to his asthma attack and hospitalisation. The book also causes Scott's asthma to psychosomatically return. When Hayden Romero is identified as the next Chimera, Scott takes rash action to stop the Doctors' bloodbath, using Hayden as bait in a sting operation to capture the para-scientists, to Liam's fury. Unfortunately, the plan fails with Liam and Hayden captured, but both are rescued by Theo afterwards. Due to this, Scott willingly accepts Theo into the Pack. Scott later has an emotional breakdown over his failed leadership and Kira having to leave (sharing a goodbye kiss with her) and is overwhelmed by the distrust and secrecy in everyone around. Upon learning of Donovan Donati's death at Stiles' hands, and because of Theo's lies, Scott kicks Stiles out of the Pack. In "Status Asthmaticus, Scott finally uncovers Theo's villainy and agenda to take Scott's Pack and True Alpha status for himself. The revealed Chimera has spiked his inhaler with wolfsbane to weaken him and arranges for Liam, enraged and supercharged due to the supermoon, kill him. Mason snaps Liam out of his rage, but Theo kills Scott afterwards. He is revived by Melissa and the supermoon's power. In season 5B, "The Last Chimera", Scott is physically and emotionally defeated over his failure, his Pack being estranged and his werewolf powers left faulty, his mortal wound from Theo not healing. Despite the rift in his friendship with Stiles, he and Scott figure out how to save Stilinski's life and succeed. Scott later takes his mom's advice to bring hope for his Pack. He marks this promise with a symbol, his tattoo, the symbol for his Pack. Amongst the enmity of Theo's Chimera Pack, and the bloodshed caused by the Dread Doctors' success, the Beast of Gévaudan, Scott ultimately pulls everyone back together including fixing his friendship with Stiles, slowly coming to forgive Liam and reuniting with Kira. After the shattered Pack is reunited, Scott's wound from Theo fully heals and he completely gets his confidence, power and motivation back. As the dangers escalate, Scott reveals he'd instigated a constructed plan in motion weeks in advance to put a stop to the collected villains: having a repentant Deucalion undermine Theo, preventing the sociopathic Chimera from stealing the Beast's power, as well as conspiring with Argent to double cross Gerard after securing the information and means to vanquish the Beast which succeeds, including saving Mason. Later, to assuredly save a consenting Hayden's life, Scott gives her the Bite, adding her to his Pack and power. In the season 6 premiere "Memory Lost", after 3 months of Beacon Hills being safe from supernatural threats, Scott believes the town no longer needs his protection, but is quickly embroiled in a bizarre case of a lost boy named Alex, his missing parents and mysterious horsemen known as the Ghost Riders. After Stiles' encounter with a Ghost Rider, Scott suddenly forgets about him. In "Superposition", when Scott tells Deaton that parts of his memory are missing, Deaton tells him that his subconscious is trying to tell him something and he should try getting some sleep. After waking up in the woods, Scott calls Malia and Lydia and tells them about the night he was bitten. Certain things don't add up, like how he knew about the body or how he got to the woods. He knows it sounds crazy, but he thinks he had a best friend who came with him that night. In "Sundowning", Scott, accompanied by Malia and Lydia go to visit Elias Stilinski despite the Sheriff's disapproval. Scott explains that they're looking for someone named "Stiles" but due to his dementia, Elias mistakes Scott for his son. In "Relics", after unsuccessfully trying to convince several students of the dangers they face by playing in the lacrosse game, Scott is forced to play in order to protect them. Unfortunately, he fails as each of the students were taken by the Ghost Riders. In "Radio Silence", Scott is forced to give up $50 to prevent Stiles' jeep from being towed. When the tow truck driver returns to take it, Scott becomes aggressive at him. Later in the episode, Scott and Lydia are contacted by Stiles through the radio. He tells them to find a place called "Canaan". In "Ghosted", Scott, Lydia and Malia drive to Canaan where they discover it's a ghost town. Scott wants to figure out why Stiles sent them there. He suffers a hallucination of his mom with a bite to her head, as a result of energy in the town. He and the others visit a house belonging to the only resident still in town, a banshee named Lenore. Scott, Lydia and Malia prepare to leave after failing to figure out what took place, only for Lenore to prevent them from leaving. After Lydia reasons with Lenore, Scott and the others are allowed to leave. Scott believes that Stiles sent them to Canaan to warn them of what will happen to Beacon Hills if they don't defeat the Ghost Riders. When Scott sees Theo back from Hell, he is furious. In "Heartless", Scott reminds Liam of all the awful things Theo has done. He wants to find Stiles but with someone they at least trust. Scott helps Liam, Hayden, Mason, Corey and Theo in catching a Ghost Rider. They succeed in catching a Ghost Rider, but can't get him to talk. They summon Deputy Parrish to talk to the Ghost Rider. When the Ghost Rider forces Parrish to shift into his hellhound form, Scott and Liam manage to push him away from the Ghost Rider. In "Blitzkrieg", Scott, along with Lydia, Malia and Peter attempt to find the rift into The Wild Hunt. They eventually find it in a tunnel. Scott and Malia are close to being killed by the Ghost Riders when Peter allows himself to be erased for a second time, allowing Scott and Malia to escape. Scott calls his mom's phone repeatedly, only to receive the same voicemail. Malia tells him that Melissa is gone but she's still alive, so they can still save her. In "Memory Found", Scott enters the cooling chamber, hoping the cold will allow him to remember Stiles, thus opening a rift. He regains his memories of Stiles but it isn't enough to open a rift. As Lydia goes through hypnosis to remember Stiles, Scott guides her, telling her to find memories of Stiles. In "Riders on the Storm", Scott is informed by Liam that everyone has been taken and they discover train tracks across town, (This is caused by Garrett Douglas using Corey to merge the phantom world with the real world). Scott is reunited with Stiles who escaped the Wild Hunt. He manages to divert the train, saving everyone in Beacon Hills and watches the Ghost Riders leave Beacon Hills, but not before turning Garrett Douglas into a Ghost Rider. In the aftermath, Scott drives off with Stiles after finishing high school. In season 6B, Scott is faced with the threat of all-out war, as it is revealed in "Said the Spider to the Fly" that when he, Malia and Lydia opened the door for Stiles to escape the Wild Hunt, a supernatural creature the Wild Hunt had imprisoned an unspecified amount of time ago, known as the Anuk-Ite, used the opportunity to escape as well. The Anuk-Ite creates fear those it encounters, and uses that fear to sustain itself. As a result, many of the civilians inside Beacon Hills who previously had contact with the supernatural in some way turn on the supernatural population out of fear, become Hunters and begin hunting down every supernatural creature they can find. While Scott is trying to figure out how to stop the Anuk-Ite, which Gerard is using to build an army of Hunters, it is revealed that he has developed romantic feelings for Malia, as in the episode "After Images", Scott is injured by a trap set by Gerard, and when Malia tries to take Scott's pain away so he can heal faster, Scott, who is half-delirious from the pain, confesses that he believes Stiles, Malia's ex-boyfriend, would be fine with them being together. It is revealed that Malia reciprocates Scott's feelings, and they share their first kiss in "Triggers", and consummate their relationship in "Genotype". When the Anuk-Ite reaches its full power and reveals the ability to turn people to stone through eye contact, Scott and Malia briefly train with Deucalion in "Broken Glass" to learn how to fight without seeing. However, in the final confrontation with the Anuk-Ite during "The Wolves of War", Scott realises that he will inevitably be unable to keep his eyes closed, and, resorting to drastic measures, claws his eyes out. Once the Anuk-Ite is defeated, Scott is initially unable to heal his eyes, but when Malia kisses him to divert his attention, his eyes heal naturally. Two years later, Scott rescues a young Omega werewolf named Alec from Hunters and informs him that although the Anuk-Ite is gone, the fight with the Hunters still continues against Gerard's former second-in-command, Tamara Monroe, and her followers. Scott offers Alec a place in his pack as one of Scott's Betas, which Alec accepts, and after Malia, Stiles and the rest of Scott's pack arrive, they all walk off together. It is also seen that Scott and Malia are still together after two years, making Malia Scott's longest-lasting girlfriend. In Teen Wolf: The Movie, it is revealed that in the 15 years since the end of the series, Scott and Deaton have moved to Los Angeles, with Scott running an animal shelter connected to Deaton's veterinary practice, he is no longer seeing Malia, and he is using his powers less frequently. He starts seeing visions of Allison (similarly to Chris), and with Malia and Lydia's help, the three bring her back to life with the Nemeton. Unfortunately, she does not fully remember him, and she is coerced to the Nogitsune's side. Later after being stabbed by her with a wolfsbane laced knife, he is able to bring back her memories by reminding her of her Hunter's code and when he first told her he loved her. After healing him with fire from a flare, they find their friends trapped in an illusion at the lacrosse stadium. Together, they trick the Nogitsune with his planned divine move (to have Scott die in Allison's arms similarly to how she died over a decade prior) and defeat him and his Oni with help from the pack. After Derek's death, Scott, Deaton, and Allison head back to Los Angeles, bringing Derek's son Eli with them (implying they will adopt him). "Teen Wolf: The Hunt", a Teen Wolf-inspired social network game for Facebook, states that Scott was born on October 6. He likes guitars, horror films, and skateboarding, and is a fan of The Black Lips, Kids of 88, Blink-182, and Lost in Kostko (Tyler Posey's band in real life, in which he plays guitar and sings lead vocals).

=== Allison Argent ===
Character	Portrayer	Season appearances		Supernatural classification
Character	Portrayer	Starring	Recurring/Guest	Supernatural classification
Allison Argent	Crystal Reed	1, 2, 3	5	Human
Crystal Reed Allison Argent is Scott McCall's first love, a member of the Argent family, a long line of werewolf hunters, being a direct identical descendant of Marie-Jeanne Valet and a member of Scott's Pack. Allison is best friends with Lydia, and later on the girlfriend of Isaac Lahey. Allison is naturally sweet, charming though she does have a rebellious streak. Throughout the series, Allison falls deeply in love with Scott. She has a natural talent for archery and is an accomplished gymnast. As a werewolf hunter, Allison displays skills in hand-to-hand combat, wiring vehicles, first aid, hunting werewolves and weaponry such as Chinese ring daggers, as well as her archery skills. During Season 2, struck with grief over her mom Victoria's death, her personality changes; she temporarily becomes reminiscent of Kate—bloodthirsty and cold-hearted. She later shows a genuine guilt and contrition for her actions. At her best, Allison is strong-willed and immensely loyal to her loved ones, going to great lengths to protect them. In the pilot, "Wolf Moon", Allison meets Scott McCall on her first day of school. There is instant chemistry between the two and they begin a romantic relationship. She is at first unaware of Scott life as a new werewolf, and her family's werewolf-hunter crusade. Her aunt Kate reveals the supernatural world to her in "Co-Captain" including her family's werewolf-hunter life by showing her a captured Derek. In the Season 1 episode "Formality", Allison is shaken up after the revelation, but she decides to be strong. She's shocked further when it is revealed Scott is a werewolf at the school formal. In the Season 1 finale, Kate entices Allison into joining her in hunting the Betas. Allison confronts Scott over his lies, but later she learns what Kate truly is, witnesses Peter Hale kill her as revenge for the Hale fire, and helps to defeat Peter. Realizing that Scott's dishonesty was to protect her, Allison kisses Scott and tells him she loves him. In season 2, Scott and Allison are in love, but carry on their romance in secret after Argent threatens Scott and she promises to never see Scott again. Her grandfather, Gerard, decides that it is time Allison be trained to be an official hunter, which in her case means being groomed to eventually succeed her mother as the family's leader. Allison helps Scott and Stiles deal with the Kanima and its mysterious Master. She is devastated in "Party Guessed", when she learns that Victoria is dead. She is later corrupted by Gerard emotionally, who uses Victoria's suicide to use her to attack and kill Derek's pack, straining her relationships with her friends and Argent. She comes close to murdering Erica and Boyd, but Argent shoots her bow out of her hand. In the Season 2 finale, when Gerard holds her captive with the Kanima so he can force Scott to have a paralyzed Derek Bite him to cure his cancer, Allison realizes Gerard's true intentions, and her mistake. Allison, saddened by the death of her mother and feeling guilty over her actions, breaks up with Scott. Scott accepts this. She also reconciles with Argent. At the start of Season 3, Allison returns to Beacon Hills, having spent the summer with Argent in France; she has had no contact with Scott whatsoever in the past four months. Although the two are no longer together, they still care deeply for each other. Allison and Argent have made a pact to lay aside their family legacy to start a normal life. Eventually Allison finds out from Scott that Victoria tried to murder him back in season 2 which is why Derek bit her, to save Scott's life. She accepts this. In violation of her agreement with her father, she begins to help Scott and Derek's Pack fight the Alpha Pack. Allison and Isaac also mend fences as she attacked him during her moral spiral, so much that they frequently partner up to deal with the current situation and they develop feelings for each other. He is chosen as her tether when she chooses to undertake a dangerous ritual to save her missing father from being sacrificed by Jennifer Blake, the Darach. Deaton warns her along with Scott and Stiles that sacrificing themselves, temporarily, will have lasting mental effects on them, such as having a permanent darkness around their hearts. In "Lunar Ellipse", Allison, with help from Isaac, finds the parents in the root cellar just before Jennifer sacrifices them. In response to the Nemeton's activation, Allison convinces her father to bring both of them out of retirement, accepts her role as leader of the family and states a new code: "Nous protégeons ceux qui ne peuvent pas se protéger eux-mêmes": "We protect those who cannot protect themselves" in English. In "Anchors", as a result of her sacrifice to the Nemeton, Allison has hallucinations of Kate and trembling which interferes with her motor and archery skills. Using her new code as an anchor, Allison regains her confidence and skills, saving Malia Tate's life. Allison appears slightly hurt, but shows acceptance when Scott starts going out with Kira. After a series of fits and starts, Allison also starts acting on her feelings for Isaac, entering into a romantic relationship with him. Isaac is electrified and induced into a coma by a trap set by off the Nogitsune saving her life. In "The Fox and the Wolf", Allison suffers a minor breakdown from all the pressure on her shoulders, confessing to Sheriff Noah Stilinski she seems to always feel scared due to the dangers and she's conflicted over her feelings with Scott and Isaac, the latter she thinks could be dying. In "De-Void", to her relief Isaac recovers, and spends the night with her. With Kira's help, she keeps him and the twins at bay whilst they are under the Nogitsune's control. After Lydia is kidnapped by the Nogitsune in "Insatiable", Allison sets out to search for her with Isaac. She is pleased that Isaac was himself when he slept with her before the Nogitsune's fly took control. In the meantime, Argent shows her how to cast her silver bullet as part of her allegiance to the Code to 'graduate' as a hunter. She opts to make a silver arrowhead instead, since the bow is her weapon. She tells Argent she loves him and is proud of what they've done. At Camp Oak Creek, the Nogitsune gains control of the Oni and turns them against Kira, Isaac, and Allison. During the fight, Isaac is slashed by the Oni and is about to be killed. Allison draws her final arrow, her silver arrowhead and fires it into the Oni, destroying the demon and saving Issac. Another Oni runs her through with its sword. Allison collapses into Scott's arms and he tells her that Lydia is safe. Dying, she comforts a horrified Scott, saying it is perfect, that she is in the arms of her first love and tells Scott she loves him. She tells Scott he has to tell her father something but dies before she can tell him. In the Season 3 finale, "The Divine Move", Isaac figures out Allison wanted Scott to tell Argent that the Oni are vulnerable to silver. She had forged four additional arrowheads, one for each demon. Argent and Isaac head to the school, joining the final stand against the Nogitsune, and using the arrowheads, destroy the last of the Oni, avenging Allison. After the Nogitsune's defeat, Scott, Stiles and Lydia return to their normal lives mourning their close friend. Argent and Isaac leave Beacon Hills together to help each other cope. In the Season 5 premiere, Allison is remembered when Scott's Pack begin senior year, writing their initials for the annual senior scribe and Scott adds Allison's initials. Lydia believes her best friend is still with them. Scott also thanks Allison due to his memories of her saving his life from Sebastien Valet, the Beast of Gévaudan (because Sebastien had confused Allison for her ancestor Marie-Jeanne, his sister, giving Scott the opportunity to escape). In Teen Wolf: The Movie, Allison is brought back to life thanks to the help of Scott, Lydia, and Malia. Unfortunately, her memories are fragmented, and her goal from waking up is to try and kill Peter and Derek. Eventually, the Nogitsune convinces her to join his side (taking on the appearance of her dead mother). After nearly killing Derek and Eli, Scott lets her injure him with wolfsbane to allow them to talk, and slowly her memories return. Eventually, the two defeat the Nogistune, and she joins Deaton, Scott, and Eli in Los Angeles, resuming her relationship with Scott. "Teen Wolf: The Hunt", a Teen Wolf-inspired social network game, states that Allison was born on March 19 in Elkhorn, Wisconsin. She likes archery, running, and Unicef, and is a fan of Karmin, Arcade Fire, Florence and the Machine, and Vampire Weekend.

=== Stiles Stilinski ===
Character	Portrayer	Season appearances		Supernatural classification
Character	Portrayer	Starring	Recurring/Guest	Supernatural classification
Stiles Stilinski	Dylan O'Brien (teen); Anthony Lapenna (child)	1, 2, 3, 4, 5, 6A	6B	Human (currently); Nogitsune (formerly)
Dylan O'Brien Stiles Stilinski (officially Mieczysław "Stiles" Stilinski) is Scott's best friend, he and Scott consider each other brothers, as well as a member of his pack. Stiles is very sarcastic, but has a very quick mind, being intelligent and clever if somewhat impractical. His intelligence is shown very early on when he figures out that Scott is becoming a werewolf and helps his best friend adapt to his new life. Stiles is Scott's sidekick and confident, helping the young werewolf deal with the supernatural crimes and events that plague the town. The show alludes to him having attention deficit hyperactivity disorder through references to his Adderall use, which lends to his fidgeting gestures and frequent flailing. Stiles often provides comic relief to the otherwise dramatic events surrounding him and Scott. Stiles' eagerness and caring nature have constantly put him in danger, nevertheless he continues to help, support and protect his supernatural friends. Stiles shares a close and affectionate relationship with his father, Sheriff Stilinski, partially due to the death of his mother, Claudia. Stiles is shown to be very emotional and insecure over her death because he was with her when she died. Stiles was 10 years old at the time, and he suffered panic attacks afterward. Stiles blamed himself for her death and secretly fears that his father blames him. Stiles, throughout Seasons 1 and 2, has an intense, unrequited love for Lydia Martin, having harbored a crush on her since the 3rd grade. He likes her for not only her beauty, but also her hidden genius, which only Stiles could see at time. In season 3, after Jackson left and Lydia was informed about the supernatural, she and Stiles form a close friendship. Stiles is shown to be working alongside Lydia to figure out who is the culprit behind the Human Sacrifices in Beacon Hills and they have a closer dynamic that suggests Stiles' love for her has changed from a simple boyhood crush into something deeper. As Stiles suffers from a panic attack, Lydia kisses him in order to make him hold his breath. Although Stiles still had a crush on Lydia, this seems to ignite his deep feelings for her yet again, which may now obviously be somewhat mutual. Stiles also wishes to keep his father out of the supernatural world out of fear he could get him killed, not wanting to lose both his parents. When the Dark Druid, or Darach, kidnaps his father for the Guardian sacrifice, Stiles eventually sacrifices himself temporarily along with Scott and Allison to save their parents, with Lydia as his Tether due to their extremely deep and strong connection. He is finally reunited with his father at the end of the mid-season finale "Lunar Ellipse", with the new burden of having a "darkness" forever shrouding his heart. With his father finally brought into the supernatural business, the two are now closer. After the Druid sacrifice, in "Anchors", Stiles suffers from hallucinations, sleep paralysis and partial dyslexia, as well as the fact that the sacrifice left a door to his mind open. Later, after using his natural intelligence to rescue Lydia from a steel jaw trap and helping to reunite the werecoyote Malia Tate with her father, Stiles' symptoms are cured. In "Illuminated" its revealed Stiles was who left the message telling serial killer William Barrow to kill Kira Yukimura though he doesn't know why or even remembers it. Stiles is later revealed to be possessed by a Nogitsune, a Dark kitsune that was able to take control of him due to the after effect of the sacrifice leaving him vulnerable and giving the nemeton power released the dark spirit. In "Riddled", Stiles comes face to face with the Trickster in his visions asking the riddle, "Everyone has it, but no one can lose it", which Stiles, eventually replies: "shadow". He comes to the dreaded realization he's possessed when the Void Kitsune assumes his very face. Posing as Stiles, the Nogitsune causes a slew of attacks that leave innocents injured and dead. The Nogitsune's hold over him is temporarily broken when Deaton poisons Stiles with a shot of letharia vulpina. In "Echo House", Stiles, to prevent the Nogitsune from harming anyone else, has himself institutionalized at Eichen House. He's shown around by his roommate Oliver. He sees that Malia is also interned there. With her help, Stiles searches for the connection between the Nogitsune and Eichen House. Stiles explains his situation to Malia, and they kiss and sleep together, which is seen as Malia merely exploring herself being human for the first time, but later forms into a relationship. Oliver, who is being controlled by the Nogitsune, attacks them both. Stiles gives up his fight with the dark kitsune, letting him back in so that he will spare Malia. In "De-Void", Scott enters Stiles's mind and using an Alpha's roar, Stiles is finally separated from the Nogitsune, but the Void kitsune has now taken on his shape. Stiles is shown to be in constant internal pain and freezing, while the Nogitsune grows stronger. After Allison's death, Stiles, while growing consistently weaker in "The Divine Move", he goes along with Scott, Lydia and Kira to the school to make a final stand against the Nogitsune. The Kitsune traps them in an alternate dimension at the school and are surrounded by the Oni. Stiles realizes that the winter reality is only an illusion. He has the foursome endure the Oni's attacks until they escape the illusion the Nogitsune has trapped them in, pulling off a divine move that turns "the game" around. Scott then Bites the Nogitsune, defeating the Dark Kitsune, winning the game, allowing Stiles to become whole, fully recovering. In season 4, Stiles is shown to hold himself in deep horror over the Nogitsune's possession of him, remembering everything he did while "feeling powerful". He is in a relationship with Malia, helping her adjust to a regular human life. Upon learning of the Dead Pool, Stiles sets up a clue board in his room to solve the mystery of who is behind the money. Stiles is reluctant to tell Malia about her true relation to Peter Hale because of the sociopathic werewolf's past actions. However, she soon discovers the truth herself, straining their relationship. In "Perishable", Stiles and Lydia, following clues leading to Eichen House, are almost murdered by Brunski and discover Meredith has been the Benefactor all along. After Malia finds out what happened and that Stiles and Lydia were almost killed, she decides to forgive him. In 'Monstrous', Stiles and Malia locate and shut down the computer servers that house the Dead Pool, terminating all the Benefactor's contracts. At the end of Season 4, Stiles starts a new investigation to find Malia's biological mother, the Desert Wolf. In season 5, Stiles is anxious of senior year, hoping his friends will remain together after graduation whilst attending college in the bay area. He is suspicious of the newcomer Theo Raeken, who says he's come to join Scott's Pack, convinced Theo's not the "grade-school friend" Scott and Stiles remember. When Scott asks Stiles why he can't just extend people the benefit of the doubt, he retorts that Scott is too trusting. In "A Novel Approach", Stiles is attacked by Donovan Donati, a petty enemy of his dad, and a recently converted Chimera. In the ensuing struggle, he kills Donovan in self-defense and by accident. Feeling distraught, guilt-ridden and horrified, his world falling apart, Stiles tells no one and His relationship with Malia becomes rocky as a result. Theo reveals to Stiles he knows about Donovan, blackmailing him to keep quiet over Theo's killing another Chimera, allegedly to save both their lives. Stiles keeps an eye on Theo, but eventually admits to him his killing Donovan to save himself at the moment felt good, but fears he'd lose Scott because killing is against Scott's moral code. In "Lies of Omission", Stiles is confronted by Scott over Donovan, the both of them under false impressions due to Theo's machinations. Scott declares they shouldn't have to kill the people they're trying to save. Stiles furiously fires back that not everyone can be True Alphas, that some people have to make mistakes, that some people "are human". Nonetheless, Scott kicks Stiles out of the Pack. In "Status Asthmaticus", a devastated Stiles' learns Malia knew about Donovan, but it didn't matter to her. Stiles replies it matters to him, knowing that his romance with Malia is over. Stiles is later accosted by Theo and he learns of the Chimera's plan to take Scott's Pack for himself, and that Scott is in danger, but Theo forces him to choose between saving Scott or his father. Stiles in incensed, but in the end rushes to save his father. In season 5B, Stiles is overcome with worry for his dad at the hospital, flashing back to his mom's funeral. He violently berates Scott for trusting Theo and believing his lies, their bond severely damaged. In the end, they manage to save Stilinski's life. Stiles and Stilinski talk about Donovan's death: Stiles confesses to his dad that he couldn't say anything to him or anyone, and it felt like he wanted Donovan dead. His Dad comforts and assures him that his actions were out of self-defense. He is then advised that to counterbalance the burden he now has on his shoulders, he should save someone's life instead of taking one and that he'll start to feel better by forgiving himself. Stiles takes his father's advice to forgive and make things up with Scott, accompanying him to reunite their estranged Pack. He tells Scott the whole story about Donovan's death in "Co-Dominance" with Scott assuring him he knows the difference between murder and self-defence. They ultimately patch everything up with Scott taking responsibility for trusting Theo despite his friend's suspicions and saying that due to the life they lead, he knew that at some point, someone was going to get a little too much blood on their hands and it should have been Scott himself. In "Amplification", Stiles steadfastly hatches a plan to break an institutionalized Lydia out of Eichen House and rescue her from Valack's deadly experiments. To his total relief and delight, in the end, they succeed in safely stabilizing her. In "Apotheosis", Stiles arrives at the McCall house to pass on a plan from Scott to Malia to take down her mother. Though he gets caught up in the skirmish between Malia and the assassin, injured, he swiftly passes the garuda talons to Malia, allowing her to defeat her mother. Stiles talks with his father telling him that everything he did, saving Malia's life amongst others left him feeling fulfilled at being able to help and save people, fully forgiving himself for killing Donovan, inspired to take up a career in law enforcement. In the season 6 premiere, after a boy and his parents disappear, Stiles and Scott search their house and realize they have been erased from existence. When Stiles goes to the boy's room, he sees the Ghost Rider who then attacks him but later disappears. Afterwards when he returns to the school, everyone soon begins to forget about him including his friends, Scott, and his father. Lydia becomes the only person who remembers Stiles due to the pair's emotional tether. After realizing he can't escape from the Ghost Riders, Stiles tells Lydia to find a way to remember him and that he loves her and always has. The next day, Lydia forgets all about him and Stiles is now erased from existence but has a slight inkling that something is off in her daily life. In "Superposition", Stiles' voice is heard in Lydia's mind when her subconscious relives the memory of Stiles being taken by the Ghost Riders. In "Radio Silence", Stiles is revealed to have been taken to a train station. He encounters Peter Hale, who was also taken by the Ghost Riders. Stiles makes several attempts to escape, with no success. He manages to make contact with Scott and Lydia through an old ham radio. He tells them to find Canaan. In "Memory Found", Stiles appears in flashbacks as Scott and Malia use the cooling chamber to remember him and Lydia undergoes hypnosis to remember him. It is then that a rift is created, from which someone appears. In "Riders on the Storm", Stiles returns to the real world just as Garrett Douglas begins merging the phantom train station with the real world. Stiles reunites with his friends, declares his love for Lydia and talks about heading off to George Washington University at Washington DC. In season 6B, Stiles is now an intern for the FBI in Virginia. He is surprised the FBI happened to be hunting Derek Hale for mass murder. In the series finale, Stiles and Derek reunite with Scott and his pack to stop the hunters and the Anuk-Ite. Two years later, Stiles is seen with Scott, Lydia, Malia, Derek, Liam, and a beta named Alec planning to stop Monroe and the hunters. Stiles does not appear in Teen Wolf: The Movie, though he is mentioned as still working with the FBI. Lydia brings up that the two broke up after she had a repeating dream of his death in a car crash that included her, worrying that it was a premonition, and that she wanted to keep him safe. His Jeep is held at Hale Auto, and is regularly stolen by Derek's son Eli. By the end of the film, at Derek's funeral, Chief Stilinski gives Eli the keys and ownership of the Jeep. "Teen Wolf: The Hunt", a Teen Wolf-inspired social network game, states that Stiles was born on April 8. He likes drumming, snowboarding, and the New York Mets. He is a fan of the bands The Ramones, The Offspring, Mumford and Sons, All Time Low and Slow Kids At Play (Dylan O'Brien's band in real life, in which he plays drums).

=== Derek Hale ===
Character	Portrayer	Season appearances		Supernatural classification
Character	Portrayer	Starring	Recurring/Guest	Supernatural classification
Derek Hale	Tyler Hoechlin (adult); Ian Nelson (teen)	1, 2, 3, 4	6	Werewolf
Tyler Hoechlin Derek Hale is a werewolf by birth. Derek lived in Beacon Hills with his family, a pack of both werewolves and humans, and his mother Talia Hale was the alpha werewolf. When he was 15, Derek fell in love with a girl named Paige. His uncle Peter came up with the idea of turning her into a werewolf so they could be together long term. Ennis, an alpha werewolf, gave her the Bite although it is not clear if Peter asked him to or if he took action on his own. Derek, hearing Paige's screams, was too late to save her and saw that Paige was rejecting the Bite. Derek attempted to pull Paige's pain out of her, but it was too intense and she asked him to end her suffering. Mercy killing her caused his werewolf eyes to change from yellow to blue. Later on, Kate Argent seduced Derek and committed statutory rape. Derek was unaware that she was a werewolf hunter and was only using him to get information on the Hales. Kate burned the Hale House down, killing most of Derek's family and rendering Peter comatose. Derek and his older sister Laura left Beacon Hills for New York soon after. Due to his tragic experiences, Derek became angry, sullen, misanthropic, cynical, defensive and mistrustful. In season 1, Derek returns to Beacon Hills six years after the fire to investigate a mysterious alpha werewolf who had bitten Scott McCall and killed Laura. He attempts to train Scott to help him control his new werewolf nature but Scott resists, blaming Derek for everything wrong in his life when Derek had nothing to do with it. He is antagonistic towards the Argents, especially Kate, the murderer of his family, and immediately disapproves of Scott's relationship with Allison. Without any support system and desperate for help, he uses empty threats against Scott and Stiles as it is the only way anyone will help him. In "Wolf's Bane", Derek discovers the alpha werewolf is his uncle Peter who had murdered Laura to rise to werewolf alpha status and his nurse was helping him sending the message to Allison. In the Season 1 finale, Derek becomes the new alpha werewolf, killing Peter to stop him from continuing to take revenge on the people responsible for the Hale fire. In season 2, Derek is on an initial power rush from the sudden power gain and sometimes acts rashly. He attempts to recruit Scott into his pack, but Scott still holds an unfounded grudge against him. He goes on to bite three students, Isaac, Erica and Boyd, after informing them of the downsides and the threat of werewolf hunters. He provides them with a chosen family of sorts and does his best to train them in hopes they will be able to survive together. As the town becomes threatened by the Kanima, he sets out to kill it to prevent it from killing even more innocent lives. As the dangers escalate, Erica and Boyd leave, frightened of the Argents' werewolf genocide. In the finale "Master Plan", Scott forces a paralyzed Derek to bite Gerard Argent even as Derek begs Scott not to, convinced Gerard will kill him after in order to become an alpha werewolf. However, Gerard was poisoned with mountain ash in Deaton and Scott's attempt to kill the werewolf hunter. Rejected, used and betrayed by Scott, Derek avoids him over the following summer even though he really could have used additional help. The reason Derek was in a hurry to build his pack and train them to survive was because an alpha pack would be on the prowl for a development such as his rising to alpha werewolf status. In season 3, the alpha pack are in Beacon Hills ostensibly to recruit Derek, and are holding Erica and Boyd hostage. Derek is devastated when Erica is found dead and is further emotionally shaken when he discovers his younger sister Cora is there and had survived the fire that killed their family. When Boyd and Cora are feral under the full moon, Derek saves Jennifer Blake, the English teacher, from them. She uses the power of virgin sacrifices in order to quickly gain his trust, and they later have sex halfway through the season. After discovering that Cora is alive, Derek displays a more caring and timid side of himself around her, becomes protective of her and seeking her approval from wanting to connect with one of his few remaining family members. In "Currents", Derek is shattered when the alpha werewolves use his body against his will to kill Boyd. Jennifer is later revealed to be the Darach who was making Human sacrifices across Beacon Hills, and had poisoned Cora with mistletoe for leverage against him to his anger. Having almost no one left in his pack and fearing for his sister's life, Derek gives up his werewolf alpha status to save Cora from death. He tricks Jennifer into using up most of her power healing Deucalion's eyesight, giving Deucalion and later Peter the chance to kill her for good. Derek leaves town with Cora for South America with the weight of his previous alpha werewolf responsibilities lifted from his shoulders. In season 3B, Derek, now an omega werewolf once again, is on a mission with Peter in Mexico to retrieve his mother, Talia's claws which are in the possession of the Calavera family and had Cora go into hiding. They retrieve the claws with the mercenary Braeden's help. After returning to Beacon Hills, Derek uses the claws in a ritual to communicate with Talia his late mother. Derek meets with Scott, telling him Talia revealed to him the Hales didn't only live in Beacon Hills, they protected the town and it needs someone like Scott to continue protecting it. Derek comes to solve his differences with Argent after he saves Argent's life from a bomb set off by the Nogitsune, and Argent tells Derek they aren't enemies anymore right after the Nogitsune had controlled him to kill the former. In the Season 3 finale, Derek and the twins face off against the Oni after bringing the triskele urn which held Talia's claws because it could be used to seal the Dark Kitsune away. Derek is last seen being cornered in his loft by the Calaveras. Suddenly the hunters are attacked, and Derek comes face to face with a revealed-to-be-alive Kate Argent. In the Season 4 premiere, "The Dark Moon", Kate is holding Derek in Mexico, in an underground Aztec temple. Scott's pack and Braeden rescue him, but Kate, using the magic of Tezcatlipoca, had Derek regressed in age and mind to 15 or 16 years old, the time of his life when he trusted Kate before she killed his family. In the episode "117", Kate used him to have him reveal to her the location of the Hale vault so she could steal a Triskelion medallion. Later on, Derek fights Kate's Berserkers, shifting to his werewolf form, and this causes him to return to his normal age, but his werewolf eye color has returned to gold. He later realizes this means he's gradually losing his werewolf power. Derek hires Braeden to find Kate for him over her contract with the Calaveras. Braeden accepts the job while simultaneously starting up a flirtation with him. Derek and Malia later seek out the Pack of Satomi Ito after finding out they are on the Deadpool. Tracking them, he finds Braeden injured, and takes her to the hospital. Derek and Braeden start a casual relationship as she gives him lessons on how to use firearms, as well as hand-to-hand combat necessary for a human against supernatural foes. He overpowers the assassins at the high school and protects Satomi's Pack. With Lydia arriving at his loft letting out a Banshee Scream, Derek contemplates the fact he may not come back alive on the mission to rescue Scott, sharing a final kiss with Braeden and refusing her weapons, implicitly ending their relationship. Derek is wounded by a Berserker and later dies. However, he revives with all of his powers restored and at their peak, destroying the Berserker, as well as gaining the talent to fully shapeshift into a wolf, like his mother Talia and sister Laura before him. Derek learns he was actually Evolving all throughout Season 4. Derek and Braeden leave together, presumably back to Beacon Hills as they hadn't packed for anything other than a rescue mission, and later go their separate ways. Derek returns to Beacon Hills in the last two episodes of season 6 to help fight the hunters. In the final flashforward, two years later, he is shown to still be allied with Scott's pack. The Anukite takes the form of Jennifer Blake to force Derek to open his eyes, suggesting his greatest fear was having to relive allowing the woman he loved be killed but instead he got froze leaving it up to Scott McCall In Teen Wolf: The Movie, Derek has taken on a role as a consultant to the Beacon Hills PD, working closely with Chief Stilinski and Deputy Parrish. It is also revealed that in the 16 years since the end of the series that he has a 15-year-old son named Eli, who has developed an anxiety of the transformation (a by-product of scaring off coyotes who almost attacked Eli as a child in his wolf form, which traumatized him). He has not fully transformed into a wolf since. His relationship with his son is strong but fragmented; while he does love him unconditionally, he is frustrated by his delinquency, specifically stealing Stile's Jeep. While consoling his son after a lacrosse game, both are attacked by Allison; while they survive, Derek is seriously injured after getting shot in the throat with a wolfsbane-laced arrow. He survives thanks to having the injury cauterized with fire by Peter. After being captured by the Nogitsune and the Oni, Derek sees that Eli has woken up his latent wolf powers, and eventually, father and son (with Scott) battle the Alpha-infused Nogitsune. Derek sacrifices himself by holding the Nogitsune down so Parrish can burn it, and his eyes change in the moments before his death from blue to red, signifying that his sacrifice had elevated him to True Alpha status.

=== Lydia Martin ===
Character	Portrayer	Season appearances		Supernatural classification
Character	Portrayer	Starring	Recurring/Guest	Supernatural classification
Lydia Martin	Holland Roden	1, 2, 3, 4, 5, 6		Banshee
Holland Roden Lydia Martin is Beacon Hills High's most popular student, a member of Scott's Pack, the former love interest of both Jackson Whittemore and the werewolf Aiden, Allison Argent's best friend, and (revealed in season 3 episode "The Girl Who Knew Too Much") is a banshee. In season 1, Lydia at first appears to be the archetypal spoiled materialistic high school queen bee. In reality she is surprisingly caring to her friends, befriending Allison on her first day at school. Lydia is also extremely intelligent, having a GPA exceeding 5.0. Her boyfriend is Jackson Whittemore, although she initially makes it apparent she is merely dating him due to his status as the school's lacrosse team captain, Lydia is actually in love with Jackson. She initially barely knows who Scott and Stiles are, only expressing interest in Scott after he is Bitten and shows skill at lacrosse. Stiles, throughout Seasons 1 and 2, has an intense, sweet crush on Lydia, but she does not reciprocate. In the Season 1 penultimate episode "Formality", Lydia is Bitten by the Alpha Peter Hale, which starts to trigger her supernatural powers. In the beginning of Season 2, Lydia recovers, but suffers from a hallucination while in the shower and goes into a fugue state running through the woods naked for two days. Afterwards she doesn't remember the entire experience at all. Lydia is determined to be immune to the Kanima's venom, and thus Derek assumes she's the Kanima, although it is later revealed to be Jackson. Lydia suffers further fugue episodes and hallucinations which, along with Jackson's rejection, causes her to have emotional breakdowns. The hallucinations are caused by Peter, who planted memories of himself in Lydia's mind from his Bite, possessing her to use her to resurrect himself. As a result, she learns pieces of the supernatural events taking place. In the Season 2 finale, Lydia selflessly faces the Kanima and successfully coaxes the shapeshifter to transform back into Jackson, by holding up the house key Jackson had given her when they were together. When Jackson asks if she still loves him while he's dying, she responds that she does and embraces him when he is cured of being a Kanima and resurrected as a werewolf. By Season 3, Lydia has been brought up to speed on the supernatural, has matured and come to care deeply for Scott and Stiles. She and Jackson have parted since he moved to London and she is attempting to get over it. Lydia enters into a purely physical relationship with Aiden, initially to distract herself from Jackson, unaware he was assigned to get close to her to get leverage on Scott. Lydia displays a strange connection to the events occurring in Beacon Hills being mysteriously drawn to the locations of several of the sacrifices and occupying her time with drawing the same tree over and over again. Lydia joins forces with Stiles to figure out who is really behind the sacrifices. In "The Girl Who Knew Too Much", when Cora Hale tells she, Scott and Stiles all they do is find bodies, not saving anyone, Lydia later appears at the memorial recital deciding to stop fighting her peculiar talents if it could help save someone with Scott offering his support. Later she is held captive by Jennifer Blake, the Darach, who attempts to kill her and Lydia lets out a high pitched Scream. Jennifer then reveals to Lydia that she is actually a banshee. Lydia later helps Stiles through a panic attack by kissing him. She then begins to develop small mutual feelings for Stiles. Lydia and Stiles find out the tree she's been consistently drawing is an inversion of the Nemeton's root system, which allows them to realize it is where the kidnapped parents are being held. During Season 3B, though Lydia continues her liaison with Aiden, she eventually tells the werewolf that he is only a 'bad guy' because he helped to kill Boyd, while she uses her abilities to help save lives. Lydia's talents allow for her to communicate on a network that predicts death: Jeff Davis has revealed this network is the whispers of other banshees. The Nogitsune kidnaps Lydia in "Insatiable" and takes her to Oak Creek. She senses the pending death of the Nogitsune - only this was the reason that he took her, to know in advance when the Oni would appear to kill him, so he would be able to take control of the demons. Lydia had warned the others through a message relayed by fellow banshee Meredith Walker not to come for her because she had sensed an impending death - Allison's. Lydia Screams for Allison when she's impaled by an Oni and is overcome with grief as she feels her best friend's death. In the Season 3 finale, Lydia meets with Deaton and Scott, and comes up with the idea to use the Hales' triskele urn to trap the Void kitsune. Shortly after the Nogitsune's defeat, she "feels" another death - this time it is Aiden. Despite her previous opinion of her lover being a "bad guy", Lydia grieves him from fighting the Oni as a "good guy". In season 4, Lydia has started over with new friends in Kira and Malia. Lydia helps Malia with her schoolwork by lending her notes. She learns some of the notes is actually computer code she doesn't remember transcribing. Using her banshee talents, Lydia learns the computer code comprises the Dead Pool, a hit list of supernaturals in Beacon Hills as well as the first cipher key to decode the list: ALLISON. Lydia immediately works on getting the other two cipher keys, later learning from Meredith the second is AIDEN. Lydia cracks the final third of the Dead Pool but sees that Meredith is on the list. She is saddened that Meredith has committed suicide out of fear. Lydia later learns her paternal grandmother Lorraine was also a banshee; she'd written a list of names, part of the Dead Pool code which lead her and Stiles to Eichen House. The twosome, along with Parrish, learn Lorraine was actually murdered by Brunski, that Meredith is alive and has been the Benefactor all along, and later on, Meredith's history with Peter. Meredith reveals to Lydia that she'd enacted the Dead Pool after Hearing Lydia's Scream when she felt Allison's death because of how many people have died because of the supernatural. Lydia tells Meredith, "Not all monsters do monstrous things", with the two banshees coming to an understanding. At the end of Season 4, Lydia gives Parrish a hard copy of the bestiary and offers him her help to learn what his supernatural species is. In season 5A, everyone is preparing for senior year. She and Parrish have also grown closer. Lydia watches over fellow senior Tracy Stewart who is actually a Kanima, and her target is Lydia's mother, Natalie. In the ensuing skirmish, Lydia is injured by the Kanima-Chimera, but implores her mom to secrecy. Tired of being defenseless, Lydia requests and takes up hand-to-hand lessons from Parrish and makes exceptional progress. Lydia, along with Stiles, discover Parrish is the one who is stealing the bodies of the deceased Chimeras, and is bringing them to the Nemeton. In "Lies of Omission", Lydia spars with Parrish to get him to "stop thinking", intending to, and successfully triggering his nature. She surmises what Parrish's doing is covering up the supernatural, protecting the secret. After a conversation with Parrish, and remembering Kira mentioning the Wild Hunt, Lydia positively identities Parrish as a hellhound. She suddenly predicts Scott's upcoming death in the library, but Theo knocks her out and kidnaps her before she can tell anyone. Theo then performs a mind-meld on her so he can find the Nemeton. Lydia is left driven out of her mind from the process. In season 5B, Lydia is rendered catatonic from Theo's clawing into her memories. Her mother Natalie has Lydia moved to Eichen House which has been usurped by an escaped Valack in disguise. In "Damnatio Memoriae", Lydia separates from her physical body before telepathically communicating with Meredith. The fellow banshee tells her she has to wake up to save her friends who are in danger and promises to teach her how to use her voice as a weapon. Under Meredith's coaching, while simultaneously predicting the carnage in Beacon Hills due to Beast of Gévaudan and predicting Malia's death at the hands of the Desert Wolf, Lydia succeeds in finding her voice. She snaps awake from her coma, Screaming and inconspicuously saves Malia's life. With her new skill, Lydia makes an attempt to escape to save her friends' lives, but Valack, glamoured as Aiden distracts her and she's restrained. Valack then performs a trephanation on her. In "Amplification", when Lydia comes to, she's gained extrasensory perception and her powers are dangerously amplified. Valack uses her to learn more about the Dread Doctors, Theo and the Beast, having her "be (his) eyes". Simultaneously, the Pack hatches a plan break her out of Eichen House, just as Theo's Chimera Pack also breaks in to capture her for Theo's own ends. Valack manages to slip away with Lydia, just as the Banshee whispers become powerful enough to kill her. Soon Lydia unintentionally kills Valack with her uncontrolled Scream, but Parrish, as the hellhound, shields the Pack from being harmed by her voice. Deaton treats her trephanation head wound with mistletoe, and Lydia recovers from her experience, to Stiles' euphoria and she's embraced by her recently enlightened mother. During the ongoing hunt for the Beast, in "A Credible Threat" the Argents have Lydia communicate with Parrish's hellhound side. Lydia tells the Guardian he can't beat the Beast without Parrish, and later convinces a disheartened Parrish to stay in Beacon Hills to help fight the Beast, reassuring him that her visions of death don't always come true and helps him figure out how to consciously tap into his powers. In "Apotheosis", Scott's Pack invoke an old piece of werewolf lore, by calling out a shapeshifter's Christian name they assume their human form. Lydia, as a harbinger of death, Screams Mason's name at the Beast of Gévaudan with her banshee voice: the sound cripples the Beast, and reverses the transformation, freeing Mason from the Beast's essence. In the season 6 premiere "Memory Lost", Lydia figures out the recent disappearances connect with the Wild Hunt and the Ghost Riders. She is present as Stiles is taken by the Ghost Riders. She promises she'll remember but appears to have forgotten him completely the next day. In "Superposition", Lydia notices a doctor sitting across from her in class (who happens to be the same one Stiles will sit next to in "Radio Silence" at the Ghost Riders' train station). She confronts the woman, wondering who she is and why she's in the class. The doctor opens her mouth and emits a high-pitched train sound. Then, when talking with Scott and Malia, Lydia admits that she had been looking for someone all day, though she doesn't know who. Lydia confesses that whoever it was, she thinks she loved him. She later falls into a trance and writes the word "mischief" several times in a format that spells the name "Stiles". She wonders "What the hell is a Stiles?" In "Sundowning", Lydia spots an elderly woman inside the Stilinski house. She excuses herself, following the woman down a hallway. Lydia calls to her, asking why she's there and what is it she wants to tell her. This woman is the same one that Stiles has a conversation with in "Radio Silence". Lydia seeing the same people that Stiles is seeing is symbolic of the pair's emotional tether, first brought up in "Lunar Ellipse" from Season 3A. In "Relics", Lydia returns to the Stilinski house, hoping to find a relic that belonged to Stiles which the Ghost Riders may have left behind. She returns to the hallway where she last saw the elderly woman. She starts ripping the wallpaper, only to be interrupted by Claudia Stilinski. In "Radio Silence", Lydia and Scott are forced to pay a tow truck driver off in order to prevent Stiles' jeep from being taken out of the school car park. She finds paperwork in the jeep which she presents to the Sheriff and Claudia. She breaks down in tears when Claudia tells her to drop the investigation of Stiles' existence. Lydia and Scott later make contact with Stiles through the radio where they both remember parts of Stiles and his existence. He also tells them not to try and find him (because it is impossible), and to rather find Canaan. In "Ghosted", Lydia has a dream of a Ghost Rider attack on a town. She, Scott and Malia travel to Canaan where Lydia discovers it to be the same town she saw in her dream. She meets a fellow banshee named Lenore who prevents her, Scott and Malia from leaving. Lydia questions Lenore on the current state of the town. After Lenore knocks Lydia across the room, the two banshees engage in a Scream off as waves of power are radiated from their hands and propelled by the Screams. After sharing a vision of the Ghost Rider attack in Canaan, Lydia snaps Lenore out of her denial and she, Scott and Malia are allowed to leave. In "Heartless", Lydia confides in her mum about her experience in Canaan and that Claudia was conjured by the Sheriff to keep him from remembering Stiles. She joins Sheriff Stilinski in Stiles' bedroom and tells him of her experience in Canaan, claiming that he conjured Claudia to subconsciously hide the fact that he's missing Stiles. Then she notices Stiles' lacrosse jersey, crying as she picks up and then tosses it to the Sheriff. In "Blitzkrieg", Lydia and Liam encounter a Ghost Rider as they make their way out of the tunnel. Liam surmises that the Ghost Rider fears Lydia as it lowers its weapon, allowing them to pass. In "Memory Found", Lydia guides Scott and Malia as they use the cooling chamber to remember Stiles. Lydia can't survive the cooling chamber due to her lack of supernatural healing, so she is put under regular hypnosis. She eventually remembers Stiles, causing a rift to form. In "Riders on the Storm", Lydia finds Stiles and they kiss passionately after he gets out of the rift. She helps Sheriff Stilinski save Stiles from the make-believe Claudia. In the aftermath, Lydia got into MIT where she'll be starting as a junior. In Teen Wolf: The Movie, Lydia is working at a firm focused on green energy, with her latest project being on using sound waves as an energy source. It is revealed that she has not used her Banshee powers in a long time, specifically her wale (she mentions that it has, "atrophied", due to her no longer using it). It is also revealed that has stopped seeing Stiles due to reoccurring premonitions of his death in a car accident with her. Like Scott, Lydia has visions of Allison (in the form of writing her name on project documents), and is able to determine the pieces needed to bring Allison back to life as well as the location. While the rest of the pack are dealing with the Nogitsune, Allison, and the Oni, her and Jackson try to solve the mystery of the fires and their connection to the creatures. Her and Jackson figure out that Adrian Harris is the one who released the Nogitsune in the first place, and are able to slyly defeat him (thanks to bringing back her Banshee wale). She is last seen at Derek's funeral. Teen Wolf: The Hunt, a Teen Wolf–inspired social network game, states that Lydia was born on March 23. She likes Mu Alpha Theta, figure skating, yoga, and astrophysics, and is a fan of Madonna, Calvin Harris, Kids of 88, Muse, and Kat Graham.

=== Jackson Whittemore ===
Character	Portrayer	Season appearances		Supernatural classification
Character	Portrayer	Starring	Recurring/Guest	Supernatural classification
Jackson Whittemore	Colton Haynes	1, 2	6	Human (originally) Werewolf/Kanima Hybrid (currently)
Colton Haynes Jackson Whittemore is the-captain of the Beacon Hills lacrosse team and the captain of the school's swim team. Jackson's birth parents were Gordon and Margaret Miller. They died in a car crash on June 14, 1995, but Margaret was kept on life support long enough for the doctors to deliver Jackson by c-section into the middle of the night as his birthday is June 15th. He was adopted by attorney David Whittemore and his wife. In compensation for their deaths, Jackson is to receive a large insurance settlement on his eighteenth birthday. Jackson is the big man on campus at Beacon Hills High, and has a competitive, self-absorbed and aggressive nature, which shows through hostility towards people who best him. Jackson wishes to make others proud of him, this desire to always live up to people's expectations appears to stem from his deeply rooted insecurity about his adoption and the fact that he does not know his real parents, leading him to be unable to see his adoptive parents as his true mom and dad. Despite his abrasive character, he is shown to care for his friends and dislikes hurting them. It turns out he is genuine friends with Danny Mahealani and he actually cares more for Lydia Martin than he lets on, though he'd never admit it. During Season 1, Jackson is angered, suspicious by Scott's sudden, seemingly impossible improvement on the lacrosse field and other activities repeatedly besting him, which impacts his psyche. Consequently, he investigates Scott, eventually coming in contact with Derek Hale and being accidentally scratched by Derek in "Magic Bullet" (who was poisoned with wolfsbane at the time and partially passes the poisoning onto Jackson through the claws), witnessing the Alpha werewolf in "Night School". He eventually discovers Scott is a werewolf. Jackson threatens to expose Scott unless he helps him become one too. The Argents grew suspicious of Jackson. At the school formal he gets drunk and exposes Scott's werewolf nature to them. In the Season 1 finale, "Code Breaker", he regrets turning Scott over to the Argents, and helps Scott, Allison and Stiles defeat the Alpha werewolf, Peter Hale. Later Jackson appears the Hale house demanding the Bite from Derek because he helped him. In the Season 2 premiere "Omega", it is revealed Derek had Bitten Jackson, which he takes with absolute smugness. However, Derek notices his body is rejecting the transformation, causing black blood to bleed out of his orifices. In the fifth episode of Season 2 "Venomous" it is revealed Jackson instead became a Kanima, a murderous reptilian shapeshifter that is a weapon of vengeance. Jackson, as the Kanima, commits numerous murders throughout Season 2. Jackson does not know that he is the Kanima, nor does the Kanima side of him know that it is Jackson. In his Kanima form, Jackson was nigh unstoppable: he had enhanced strength and agility that far exceeded the werewolves, even Derek, the Alpha werewolf, the Kanima could heal from being shot by Argent repeatedly, Derek slashing its throat, and Allison putting an arrow in its head and stabbing it in the chest. The Kanima's claws also produced a paralytic poison that could completely immobilize a victim by the Kanima slashing the back of the neck and it could scale walls. The Kanima seeks a Master who wishes to exact revenge on others to control the shapeshifter and the Kanima carries out whatever vengeance the Master bids, revealing that as the Kanima, Jackson's every move is controlled by someone else. In the episode "Fury", it is revealed Jackson came across an unstable, traumatized student, Matt Daehler who became his Master. Matt had the Kanima murder former Beacon Hills High students who almost caused him to drown when he was a little boy during a drunken pool party. After Gerard Argent kills Matt, he becomes Jackson's new Master. It is revealed that Jackson became the Kanima because he is an orphan, exemplified by his outward behavior and personality, meaning he lacks an identity. He can be saved by a person with whom he shared a true bond; in Jackson's case, this person is Lydia. Through Lydia's selflessness in the Season 2 finale, "Master Plan", the Kanima reverts to Jackson. Aware of what he is, Jackson then allows Derek and Peter Hale to kill him. Dying, he asks Lydia does she still love him, she responds that she does. Jackson returned to life and finally becomes a werewolf, however, with blue eyes rather than the common yellow. His eyes as a werewolf are blue, because as the Kanima he took innocent lives (regardless of his intent); Derek, Peter, and the twins Ethan and Aiden share this feature. In the Season 3 premiere, Lydia revealed that Jackson was trained by Derek to control his Werewolf nature. Later he and Lydia parted and his father moved him to London. He is next seen late in season six, when he is revealed to be in a same-sex relationship with Ethan Steiner, another werewolf. The pair live together in London attempting to find other werewolves, but are attacked by hunters linked to Gerard Argent. Returning to Beacon Hills, they are captured by Gerard's lieutenant, school guidance counselor Ms. Monroe, although they are later freed by Lydia and Stiles after Gerard reveals he has the pair captive. When telling Lydia he is in a same-sex relationship now, she is initially startled and then happy that he "figured it out". He is seen checking out a female and male student in his brief scene at Beacon Hills High, and to have retained some of his Kanima abilities, including venom, claws, and the ability to manifest Kanima eyes and a Kanima tail, but is unable to completely shift into one. In the closing montage of the series finale, he and Ethan are shown happily together in London once more. In Teen Wolf: The Movie, Jackson has been brought back to Beacon Hills by Lydia for the ritual to bring back Allison. He mentions that he is still with Ethan, and slyly mentions that he was coerced by Lydia to come back (he agreed on the condition that Ethan never find out that he returned). He works with Lydia on determining who was starting the mysterious fires around Beacon Hills and their connection to the return of the Nogitsune. Oddly enough, it is revealed that while he still retains limited Kanima abilities, his Werewolf powers are never mentioned. After discovering that the culprit of the fires and Nogitsune's release is Adrian Harris, as well as his plan, Harris severely injures Jackson by shooting him multiple times. With quick thinking from Lydia, the two are able to subdue Harris. He is later seen with Lydia at Derek's funeral. "Teen Wolf: The Hunt", a Teen Wolf-inspired social network game, states that Jackson was born on June 15. He likes Porsche, Golden State Warriors, USC Trojans, and the San Jose Sharks, and is a fan of Wiz Khalifa, Nicki Minaj, Drake, and Gym Class Heroes.

=== The Nogitsune ===
Character	Portrayer	Season appearances		Supernatural classification
Character	Portrayer	Starring	Recurring/Guest	Supernatural classification
The Nogitsune	Aaron Hendry (voice); Dylan O'Brien (host body)	3	6	Kitsune
Dylan O'Brien "The Nogitsune" (野狐) is a Void, or Dark, Kitsune, a 1000-year-old spirit. The Nogitsune possessed Stiles Stilinski, causing a string of chaos throughout Beacon Hills. He is a trickster that feeds on pain, tragedy, chaos and the like. Stiles was vulnerable to Nogitsune's control as the sacrificial ritual Stiles took, along with Scott and Allison, had left a door to his mind ajar. This Void kitsune was the reason the demon entities known as the Oni were summoned to Beacon Hills by the 900-year-old Kitsune Noshiko Yukimura; to search for the Nogitsune and kill him. The Nogitsune first appears to Stiles in a mental apparition in "Riddled". Stiles is sleepwalking, but in reality Stiles does not know he is actually still asleep. Stiles sees himself in a basement with the kanji "己" carved on a wall. The Nogitsune appears as a bandaged humanoid wearing an over-worn leather bomb jacket. The Void Kitsune haunts Stiles referring to himself (along with Stiles) as "we". The Nogitsune riddles Stiles with the question, "Everyone has it, but no one can lose it. What is it?" Stiles eventually wakes up and the Nogitsune, inhabiting his mind, vanishes. When Stiles loses consciousness during his MRI test for frontotemporal dementia, the same disease that killed his mother, the Nogitsune appears again in Stiles' mental visions. Stiles solves the riddle: a shadow. The Nogitsune removes the bandages from his body revealing Stiles' face: the Void kitsune has taken on Stiles' form as his 'shadow'. He instantly takes control of Stiles' body. The Void Kitsune causes utter chaos, arranging for traps, attacks to happen which kill innocents including a sabotaged electrical cable at Beacon Hills Memorial hospital, which induces Isaac into a coma, a bomb scare at the high school but the real bomb going off at the Sheriff's department. The Nogitsune employed absolute trickery, taunting Stiles' loved ones as his MRI test results displaying positive signs of the disease were fake, he was a master at Machiavellian schemes, at one point tricking Scott into thinking Stiles had broken free of his possession, enlisting Scott to siphon away the victim's pain from the very traps he'd set so he could absorb all the collected pain from Scott's body to grow stronger and maneuvering Stiles' friends to use as bodyguards from the Oni. In the episode, "The Fox and the Wolf", it is revealed Noshiko Yukimura had summoned the Nogitsune in the first place back in 1943. Noshiko had wanted him to possess her to seek vengeance upon the corrupt army medics that had caused a manslaughter at Camp Oak Creek, by selling medical supplies for her fellow interns on the black market and the death of her lover Corporal Rhys. She wanted her pain and tragic experience to imbue the Void Kitsune spirit with power. Only the trickster, once it was unleashed by Noshiko, instead possessed the bandaged corpse of Rhys because a Kitsune cannot be controlled. The Nogitsune had unleashed his horror causing a bloodbath at the Eichen House institution where the interns had been relocated which Noshiko had never intended to happen. She eventually cornered him and with some help from her werewolf friend, Satomi, slew the Nogitsune. But because the Void Kitsune could not be killed, his very essence, embodied in the form of a fly, left Rhys' corpse, was captured by Noshiko and buried beneath the magical tree, the Nemeton, just outside Beacon Hills. He laid there dormant for the next seventy years, but the sacrifice undertaken by Stiles, Scott and Allison had released him from his prison. The Nogitsune corners Noshiko Yukimura in the basement of Eichen House in "De-Void" where he steals Noshiko's last Kitsune Tail from her, her last remaining kaiken and cuts open Stiles' stomach which releases a stream of flies from Stiles' body. These flies infect and possess Derek, Isaac and the twins causing them to go feral, endangering their lives and others. The Void Kitsune is eventually subdued with Deaton drugging Stiles' body with Kanima venom. As assessed by Peter Hale, Stiles is in a battle for control of his mind; the Nogitsune has maintained his grip on Stiles body by playing an endless game of Go with Stiles as Rhys' corpse atop the Nemeton within Stiles' subconscious. Scott uses an Alpha's ability to meld Stiles' mind with his and Lydia's to free Stiles from the Dark influence. Scott uses an Alpha's roar while present in Stiles' head and Stiles tips over the Go board and breaks free of the Nogitsune. This process splits Stiles from the Nogitsune, Stiles is free and the infected werewolves are cured of their possession. But the Void Kitsune now exists in real time as a copy of Stiles' shape and takes Lydia hostage. The Nogitsune holds Lydia at the abandoned Camp Oak Creek. He taunts her telling her that Stiles is dying and he is growing stronger. Lydia senses the Void Kitsune's impending death at the hands of the Oni, but he had kidnapped Lydia just for the very purpose of knowing in advance when the Oni would be close enough to him. When the demons appear, he takes Noshiko's last Tail and snaps it with the Oni so close to him that the control of the Oni is transferred from Noshiko to him. The Nogitsune then unleashes the Oni upon the group, though he and his new minions retreat after one Oni is destroyed and another succeeds in killing Allison. In the Season 3 finale episode "The Divine Move", the Nogitsune, with the Oni still under his control, enters the final stages of his plan of destruction by unleashing the demons all over Beacon Hills; with each person dying as a result of being cut by their blades. Led by Scott, the entire group make one last stand against the Void Kitsune and his forces, intent on trapping him within the triskele urn that contained Talia Hale's claws, as its wood was made from the Nemeton, the very power that kept him trapped before. When Scott, Kira, Stiles, and Lydia face off against the Nogitsune at the school, the Dark Kitsune informs them that the only way to stop the chaos is for Scott to kill Stiles (comparing the young Alpha and his best friend respectively to a kaishakunin and a samurai) in a Seppuku ritual. When Stiles feels he has no other choice, he grabs Kira's dropped katana and starts to kill himself to end the strife, but then figures out that everything that is happening around him and his friends is an illusion, which they break. The Nogitsune, angered that his "game" has been ruined by the destruction of the Oni and by Stiles' divine move, attempts to kill his host. He advances on Stiles and Lydia raging, "I'm a 1000 years old! You can't kill me!" Stiles and Lydia tell the Kitsune they can change him instead by changing the body of his host's copy. Stiles tells his foe he "can't be a Fox and a Wolf" moments before Scott Bites him, turning him and Kira stabs him with her sword. The Nogitsune loses his power, his Stiles shape which collapses and dissipates like dry clay, reverts to the form of a fly, and Isaac seals him in the triskele urn, putting an end to his threat. In Teen Wolf: The Movie, the Nogitsune returns as the co-main antagonist, alongside Adrian Harris. It is revealed that since being sealed away, Liam kept the urn holding the Nogitsune in a ramen shop run by him and his girlfriend Hikari (a kitsune). Adrian is able to obtain it and release the demon, with its focus being defeating Scott in a divine move (in this case, killing his pack and having Scott die in Allison's arms by her hands). With this in mind, he is able to control Chris, convince Scott to reunite the pack, and bring Allison back to life via the Nemeton. Deaton figures out the Nogitsune's ruse and frees Chris, but it escapes in its fly form. Later, it is able to convince Allison to join its side (appearing as her long-dead mother) and rebuild its Oni army by killing a BCPD officer who was unknowingly a kitsune. With the Oni army, it captures, Derek, Eli, Chief Stilinski, Liam, Hikari, and Mason. It is able to convince Scott and Allison (her memories now restored by Scott) to come to its illusion domain in the lacrosse arena (surrounded by mountain ash thanks to Harris), and nearly succeeds in its divine move until it was averted thanks to quick thinking from Scott and Hikari. In the final battle between Scott, Derek, Eli, and the Nogitsune, it is revealed that it now has wolf-like abilities from Scott's bite in season 3. Thanks to Derek's sacrifice, Parrish is able to destroy it for good by burning it.

=== Malia Tate ===
Character	Portrayer	Season appearances		Supernatural classification
Character	Portrayer	Starring	Recurring/Guest	Supernatural classification
Malia Tate	Shelley Hennig	4, 5, 6	3	Werecoyote
Shelley Hennig Malia Tate (occasionally Malia Hale) is a werecoyote, a member of Scott's Pack, the adoptive daughter of Henry Tate and his late wife Evelyn, and the love interest of Stiles starting in season 3B. She also has a deceased younger adoptive sister named Kiley. In "Letharia Vulpina"; however, it is revealed Peter Hale is Malia's biological father. Malia's birth mother is an assassin named Corrine also known as the Desert Wolf. At age 9, Malia was presumed dead for eight years from a car accident that claimed the lives of her mother and her younger sister. She was actually alive, fully transformed as a coyote. On the night of the car crash Malia had shapeshifted on a full moon. Her shift had supposedly caused the accident, and killed her mom and sister in the process earning her blue eyes by taking innocent lives. In the Season 3B premiere "Anchors", Sheriff Stilinski reopens the case under a suspicion a supernatural may have been involved, and Scott and Stiles discover Malia in the woods. In the episode "More Bad Than Good", Scott uses his Alpha roar to have Malia return to human form. Sheriff Stilinski and Stiles bring her home and she is reunited with Henry. After eight years as a coyote in the wild, Malia is very in touch with her animal side, is rather brash, quick to fight, and tends to speak her mind. She initially struggles academically and shows little regard for social etiquette. As the series progress, Malia readjusts to her humanity. In "Echo House", Malia is interned at Eichen House sanatorium. There, she sees Stiles who has voluntarily committed himself. When he walks up to Malia, she attacks him aggressively. Malia tells Stiles she is unhappy as a human, because she now lives back with her father and can't tell him that she killed her mom and sister, and Scott's Alpha roar has caused her to remain human and unable to fully transform again. Stiles, who needs access to the basement for information regarding the Nogitsune's connection to Eichen House, specifically the kanji "self" on the wall, makes a deal with her: she helps him get into the basement, then Scott will teach her how to change back. Very soon afterward, they sleep together. Behind a wall in Eichen House, they find the Nogitsune's original host's body, a sheathed katana, and a photo. Afterwards, they are attacked by Oliver, Stiles' roommate, who is being controlled by the Nogitsune. Stiles lets the Nogitsune back in, in exchange for the Kitsune sparing Malia. Malia later prepares to leave Eichen House, intending to rescue Stiles. She eventually brings the sheathed sword and the photo to Scott. At the end of Season 3, Malia has started to learn to live as a human, enrolling at Beacon Hills High School and joining Scott's Pack. In season 4, Malia is continuing her romance with Stiles, with the Pack attempting to help her reintegrate back into society. Malia has a survival-of-the-fittest mentality, as shown when she was willing to leave Lydia behind when the Pack was held captive by the Calaveras. She regularly sneaks into Stiles' house at night. Malia is struggling in learning control during the full moon. In "The Benefactor", Stiles stays with her on the full moon while she is transformed into her werecoyote shape for the first time; he surmises she lacks control because of her guilt in what she did to her mother and sister. He relates to her because of the Nogitsune's possession of him. Malia perfects control at this. The Pack keeps Malia in the dark that Peter Hale is her biological father, to protect her from the sociopathic werewolf. But in "Weaponized" Malia discovers the truth when she sees she is listed on the Dead Pool as "Malia Hale". Malia is severely hurt and feels betrayed by Stiles keeping the information from her, straining her relationship with him. Malia meets with Peter, learning from him her real mother is known as 'the Desert Wolf'. Malia doesn't see herself as different from Peter, he being a killer while she killed her adoptive mother and sister. In "Monstrous" after being almost killed and learning of Stiles' own near-death experience, Malia, with a push from Melissa, ultimately makes up with him, and at the Martin lakehouse they locate the computer servers that house the Dead Pool, and shut them down. On the mission to rescue Scott and Kira, Peter tries to coax Malia into unleashing her animal side in the fight against Kate and the Berserkers, but Malia sees Peter for the monster he truly is upon learning he was intending to murder Scott. Malia is pleased that Stiles is looking into her biological mother. In season 5, Malia has settled back into her relationship with her dad Henry. She receives her summer school results allowing her to be a senior with the others. In "Dreamcatcher", Malia receives a photo of a carnage caused by the Desert Wolf from Braeden through Stiles. Malia is content in just "putting Tracy Stewart down" after her out-of-control murder spree. After Scott's encouraging and urging to save Tracy instead, with the latter at her mercy, Malia goes through with it. Unfortunately, Tracy is euthanized by the Dread Doctors at that moment to her horror. Malia soon grows to trust the newcomer Theo Raeken. In "A Novel Approach", while on a driving lesson with Theo, after reading Valack's novel, Malia remembers more of the crash that caused her family's death: it was not her full-moon transformation, but a woman that opened gunfire on the car that caused it to go off the road in the first place. She realizes the woman was the Desert Wolf. Unable to deal with it, Malia doesn't tell anyone. She notices Stiles' obvious lies, and starts to lose trust in him. In "Lies of Omission", Malia fails to save another Chimera. The recent trauma and chaos having left its mark, Malia states she can't follow Scott's rules on protecting people anymore and considers leaving the Pack. In "Status Asthmaticus", Malia reveals to Stiles she knew about Stiles' killing Donovan, but it didn't matter to her. Nonetheless, her relationship with him has ended. Malia secretly makes the decision to kill the Desert Wolf in vengeance for her family. In season 5B, when Braeden returns to assist Malia in her plan, she learns the Desert Wolf is coming back to Beacon Hills for her. Because of this and not wanting to put her friends in danger, Malia quits Scott's Pack saying she can't help. She and Braeden prepare for her mother's arrival, but learns she has taken Deaton hostage. In "The Sword and the Spirit", despite her best efforts, Theo seduces Malia to convince her to let him help the two find Deaton and the Desert Wolf. He betrays them at the last minute as he'd made a deal with the assassin and Malia finally comes face to face with her mother (Corrine). Malia faces off against her in vengeance for causing her to kill her family while Corrine wants to take back the power she transferred to Malia upon giving birth to her. When the Beast of Gévaudan intercepts, Malia chooses to save Deaton and Braeden over killing her mother which gives her back her confidence, and the resolve to rejoin the Pack. Braeden and Malia keep an eye out for Corrine as the assassin will come to kill Malia to reclaim her power on the full moon while also assisting in the hunt for the Beast. In "Apotheosis", despite their best efforts, Malia, Braeden are caught in a gunfight and faceoff with her mother at the McCall house. After Braeden is wounded, Corrine eventually has Malia at her mercy, but Stiles had slipped Malia the garuda talons from the Chimera Belasko at Scott's suggestion: once Corrine claws Malia, she stabs her mother back with the talons and yells "I want my family back." Malia drains the last of the Desert Wolf's power, then Braeden captures Corrine, gaining justice for her mom and sister, while also sparing Corrine. In the season 6 premiere, Malia is seen in her coyote form for the first time since season 3, as she had finally learned to fully shapeshift. She helps the Pack investigate a missing couple and determines they are still alive due to the lack of blood but says she couldn't smell any sign they were ever in their car. In "Superposition", Malia is revealed to be losing control of her animal side as she is growling at people, clawing at her desk when stressed and she has built a coyote den at the corner of her bedroom. She later admits to Scott and Lydia that she knows she wasn't alone when she was chained up during the full moon. In "Sundowning", while she's making up for a test, Malia loses control and shifts into her coyote form and makes her way to the school basement. In "Relics", Malia hears dying screams while running through the woods. The smell of blood leads her towards a murder scene, but is shot by Argent before she could investigate further. In "Radio Silence", after recognising the distant howl and scent of a dying werewolf, Malia and Scott track it to the woods. They both realise that it's Peter Hale who had escaped from the train station. Both Malia and Scott didn't know Peter was taken by the Ghost Riders 3 months prior. In "Ghosted", while she, Scott and Lydia are visiting Canaan, Malia is affected by energy in the town, causing her to hallucinate her dead adoptive mum Evelyn and sister Kiley as well as Theo. He shoots her, causing her to fall directly in between Evelyn and Kiley as they pull her into the ground. While trapped in Lenore's house, Malia and Scott encounter the ghost of Lenore's son Caleb who starts to drown them. They stop drowning once Lydia reasons with Lenore. When Malia sees Theo at Scott's house, she is furious. In "Heartless", Malia repeatedly punches Theo as he betrayed her back in season 5. With her claws out, she plans to finish him off, but Scott and Liam intervene. She accompanies a healed Peter in looking for the rift. In "Blitzkrieg", Malia and Scott fight the Ghost Riders long enough for Lydia and Liam to get away. She saves Scott before the Ghost Riders could kill him, however the two of them are not enough to hold off the Riders for long. They're saved by Peter who allows himself to be erased, giving them the chance to run. In "Memory Found", Malia enters the cooling chamber shortly after Scott. She finds herself in the school library, where each book represents a memory. She soon finds the shelf with all her memories of Stiles. In "Riders on the Storm", after finding Peter in the Ghost Riders' dimension, Malia musters a small amount of love for Peter to call him "Dad". She, along with Peter and Theo join Scott in the final showdown against Garrett Douglas and the Ghost Riders. After the Ghost Riders take Garrett and leave, Malia has to attend summer school before she could graduate. In season 6B, Malia, who has successfully graduated, excitedly plans to travel to France, but is convinced to stay in Beacon Hills by Scott and Lydia when it becomes apparent that there is a new supernatural problem to deal with. While dealing with the threat of new Hunters emerging and killing supernatural creatures without mercy, Malia is surprised but secretly pleased when Scott deliriously indicates his feelings for her in "After Images", as it is revealed that she has developed feelings for him in return. Malia initially tries to tell Scott how she feels about him in "Face-to-Faceless", but to her frustration, she is unable to spark up the courage. In "Pressure Test", while being trapped inside the police station by Hunters, the Anuk-Ite amplifies Malia's fear of being killed to the point where she becomes almost hysterical, but Scott calms her down. In "Triggers", Malia, Scott, Lydia and Argent attempt to destroy the Hunters' arsenal, but when it is revealed to be a trap set by the Hunters, Scott and Malia end up locked in a room which rapidly begins to run out of oxygen. After Lydia and Argent rescue them, the near-death experience is enough to give Malia the courage she needs to kiss Scott, and although Malia's Alpha is initially taken aback, Scott then responds by passionately kissing Malia, confirming that he returns her feelings. In "Werewolves of London", Malia and Scott try to recruit every surviving supernatural creature they know to help them fight the Hunters, but are mostly unsuccessful with the exception of Peter, who joins them when he looks into Malia's mind and sees that her feelings for Scott have developed to the point where she has fallen in love with him. In "Genotype", Malia and Lydia work to resurrect the dead Hellhound Halwyn to try and defeat the Anuk-Ite, but he is only able to live long enough to tell them it can kill through eye contact if its two halves merge, before dying again. After this, Malia has sex with Scott, consummating their relationship. In "Broken Glass", Malia and Scott are trained by Deucalion to fight the Anuk-Ite without having to look at it. Unfortunately, in "The Wolves of War" Malia is (off-screen) unable to resist looking into the Anuk-Ite's eyes, and is turned to stone, although she is freed from her stony prison after the fear-monger is defeated. When Malia sees that Scott had to claw his eyes out to fight the Anuk-Ite and is unable to heal himself, she gently kisses him at the suggestion of Lydia to divert Scott's attention and allow his eyes to heal naturally. Two years later, Malia arrives with the rest of the pack at the scene where Scott is talking to Omega werewolf Alec about the war with the Hunters. Malia gazes lovingly at Scott more than once during this encounter, and they walk off together, revealing that after two years, Malia is still in a relationship with Scott, making him Malia's longest lasting boyfriend. In Teen Wolf: The Movie, Malia and Scott have since broken up (having an awkward reunion), and she is now in a sexual relationship with Deputy Parrish, being one of the few remaining members of the pack to stay in Beacon Hills. She helps restore Allison back to life at the Nemeton with Scott, Lydia, and Jackson. When the Oni attack Derek's house, she is the only one to survive the onslaught thanks to remembering that Oni can only survive in the dark. Her and Parrish arm themselves in silver to prepare for the final battle, hinting that they end up a couple (though this is not confirmed). She is able to get Parrish to use his powers to burn away the mountain ash surrounding the lacrosse stadium, and watches as he destroys the Nogitsune for good. She is last seen at Derek's funeral.

=== Kira Yukimura ===
Character	Portrayer	Season appearances		Supernatural classification
Character	Portrayer	Starring	Recurring/Guest	Supernatural classification
Kira Yukimura	Arden Cho	4, 5	3	Kitsune
Arden Cho Kira Yukimura is a kitsune, the daughter of Ken and Noshiko Yukimura, and Scott's second love interest. In season 3B, Kira is the new girl at school, having moved to Beacon Hills from New York. Kira is sweet and intelligent, but introverted and socially awkward. After being brought into the supernatural and learning of her own nature, as well as her family's secrets, she shows a defined sense of ethics, protection, a growing sense of confidence and camaraderie on joining Scott's Pack. As a Kitsune, Kira is of the type Thunder: she has power over electricity, and she naturally wields a katana sword as a "gateway" to her Fox Spirit. At Season 3B's start, "Anchors", Kira looks to make friends in school, but is embarrassed because her dad, Ken, is the new history teacher and prone to unintentionally embarrassing her. Early on, Kira has an obvious crush on Scott, which he reciprocates. In "Galvanize", Kira is revealed to be supernatural after mass murderer William Barrow kidnaps her and, while attempting to kill her using electrocution, causes her to manifest an ability to absorb electricity. Scott witnesses this display, and Kira is intrigued that Scott doesn't "run the other way" from her peculiar circumstances. In "Illuminated", it is shown that Kira radiates an aura that is shaped like a bipedal fox, flaring around her like armor. Scott invites her to Danny's black light party and their interest in each other strengthens. Later, she witnesses Scott and Derek Hale fight the Oni in their werewolf forms, revealing the supernatural lives of Scott, his Pack, and everything else to her, to her elation and inspiration. Kira eventually does research into her own abilities and theorizes that she is a Kitsune, the Fox trickster. This is later confirmed by Derek. Kira discovers further abilities; super speed and a natural talent for swordplay. When her mother, Noshiko, displays similar talents, Kira discovers, to her shock, that Noshiko is also a Kitsune and the one who summoned the Oni to Beacon Hills. In "The Fox and the Wolf", Kira and Scott confront her parents. Kira is distrustful of her mom and is further baffled when Noshiko reveals that she is actually 900 years old. Noshiko tells Kira her story of her time as an intern at Camp Oak Creek, and her role in unleashing the Nogitsune. Noshiko asks Kira to trust her this once, telling her she is a Thunder kitsune, and showing her how to use her FoxFire to repair her shattered katana. Upon being passed the katana, Kira is told that Noshiko's legacy is now hers. Kira comes to grips with her Kitsune nature, and resolves to help save Stiles. In "De-Void", still unable to face her parents after everything they've kept from her, Kira spends the night with Scott, she shares a kiss with him. In "Insatiable", Kira along with Isaac and Allison go up against Noshiko and the Oni trying to dissuade her mother from outright killing the Nogitsune as the process could potentially kill Stiles. Unfortunately, the Nogitsune takes control of the Oni and turns the demons against them and Allison is killed. In the Season 3 finale, Kira is told by Ken and Noshiko their move at this point has to be a divine move in order to stop the Nogitsune. Kira goes along with Scott, Stiles and Lydia to stop the Nogitsune at the school. She battles the Oni and then fatally stabs the Nogitsune running the demon's corporeal form through with the katana after Scott Bites him. In season 4, Kira has her romance with Scott on hold because she wants to give Scott the time he needs to grieve for Allison. Kira has also become completely integrated with the Pack, becoming close friends with Lydia and Malia, wanting to use her abilities to protect people in Beacon Hills. In "Muted", Scott decides to give in to his feelings for Kira, sharing a deep kiss with her, to her joy. Scott and Kira finally go on their first date. They are attacked by Kate Argent and her Berserker and are taken to La Iglesia. Kate has Scott converted into a new Berserker, and under the malevolent werejaguar's control, Kira is attacked by Scott. Hallucinating her mother and determined to save Scott, Kira breaks off a piece of obsidian in the temple and uses it to trigger her kitsune healing. She saves Scott when, as per Peter Hale and Kate's plan, he's almost destroyed as a Berserker. Kira keeps the obsidian shard when returning to Beacon Hills. Afterward, Ken has the shard reshaped into a shuriken and Noshiko presents her with the star, and Kira realizes the shuriken is her first Kitsune Tail. In season 5A, Kira, after a summer with her parents in New York, starts senior year with her friends, including she and Scott consummating their relationship. She has been fashioned a customized sword by Ken that was forged with a "unique power". In "Dreamcatcher", Kira takes Tracy on the Chimera Tracy Stewart, and displays an Evolution: her Kitsune aura erupts around her frame and becomes naturally visible. Second time around, she starts to lose control, attempting to behead another hybrid shouting "Watashi wa shi no shisha da!", but Scott stops her. Her Fox Spirit has also become independent which Scott witnesses when he views the Fox spirit, though he keeps quiet about it. Kira is flabbergasted when Scott tells her he loves her under the impression he doesn't realize he did, but is lighthearted upon hearing he remembers, and that he meant it. After the debacle at Eichen House, Kira starts to feel she's causing problems, when she can't read or finish Valack's novel, due to her Fox being affected by it, and later when she almost kills her mother in a rage. In "Ouroboros", Kira goes into a trance leading to route 115. She learns, to her horror, her sword was found impaled in the body of a Chimera, but she can't remember. Noshiko gives Kira instructions for to allow her Fox Spirit to read the novel and Kira remembers the Dread Doctors experimented on her during the storm on route 115, amplifying her Kitsune status and power, revealing that they're responsible for her Evolution. She and her parents decide they have to leave so they can tame her Fox spirit. Kira has Scott tell her the truth about her Fox Spirit; he does. She shares a kiss goodbye with him, and leaves Beacon Hills and the Pack behind. In season 5B, "Codominance" Kira and her mother have traveled to Shiprock, New Mexico to find a solution for to control her Fox Spirit. They come into contact with local skinwalkers. Kira is put through a test by the shifters, facing off against an Oni. Her Fox Spirit takes control and destroys the demon. The three skinwalkers declare that while Kira wields the sword, the Fox wields her: Kira is now condemned by the skinwalkers to stay and become one herself. Scott appears in time to help her and Noshiko escape. Overjoyed, Kira tells a light-hearted Scott she loves him and rejoins the Pack. In "The Sword and the Spirit", Kira is advised by her father Ken to use her mind as a weapon instead of the sword and she'll "outfox the Fox" as a new solution to control the Spirit, dismantling her mystical belt-sword. In "Amplification", as part of the plan to break Lydia out of Eichen, Kira draws power from the electrical grid which overloads her, causing her Fox Spirit to periodically jump out. In "A Credible Threat", Kira completely loses control, possessed by her abrasive, bloodthirsty Fox Spirit (whom is fluent in Japanese) but Scott pulls her back with his werewolf voice. When the dangers escalate with Mason revealed to be the host for the Beast of Gévaudan, Kira takes desperate action and slips away with the shards of her sword, returning to the skinwalkers. She tells him that she will join them, but only if they assist her to help save her friends. The skinwalkers accede to Kira's request but also telling her, there will be a price. In "Apotheosis", Kira (now has her Fox Spirit under control) returns to Beacon Hills just in time to stop a vengeful Theo from killing everyone. Kira tells the sociopathic Chimera the skinwalkers have a message for him: his sister wants to see him. Using her sword, harnessing the skinwalkers' power, Kira creates an underworld chasm. Theo's undead sister emerges and drags Theo down to Hell. Later, due to her deal with the skinwalkers, Kira returns to Shiprock, New Mexico to be taught how to fully navigate her Fox Spirit. She promises Scott she will return, hands him her shuriken Tail to keep it safe for her and gives him a kiss goodbye, leaving the Pack for a second time.

=== Liam Dunbar ===
Character	Portrayer	Season appearances		Supernatural classification
Character	Portrayer	Starring	Recurring/Guest	Supernatural classification
Liam Dunbar	Dylan Sprayberry	5, 6	4	Werewolf
Dylan Sprayberry Liam Dunbar is a new freshman at Beacon Hills High School in season 4, Mason's best friend and a Beta werewolf in Scott's Pack. Liam is loyal, extroverted, sometimes cocky, but has severe anger issues. Liam lives with his mother, and step-father Geyer. In sixth grade, Liam had gone into one of his rages, injuring Hayden Romero's face on the day yearbook photos were taken, earning him her enmity. Liam transferred to Beacon Hills High after being kicked out of Devonford Prep because he'd vandalized his lacrosse coach's car. Over the series, Liam's rage problems mostly diminish, with him wanting to atone for his actions, being exchanged for a more emotionally responsible, mature and dutiful personality. Liam is Scott's first true Beta. Liam first appears in "Muted" at lacrosse practice. He is accidentally injured by Scott who immediately helps bring him to the hospital. Liam enters the supernatural world when he's attacked, held hostage by Sean Walcott, a wendigo. Scott attempts to rescue him, but Liam is thrown over the hospital roof. Sean has Scott's arms pinned, so to save Liam from falling to his death, Scott catches Liam with his fangs, Biting him, transforming Liam into his first Beta. In the next episode "The Benefactor", Liam's werewolf abilities begin to manifest. At Lydia's lake house, Scott's Pack meet with Liam, attempt to gain his trust and debrief him of their supernatural species. Annoyed, Liam angrily snaps at them, losing control, fully transforming for the first time and running out into the Preserve. Scott and Argent effectively subdue him. Horrified at what's happened to him, Liam tearfully admits he deserved getting kicked out of his old school. He fears his parents seeing him as a monster. Scott comforts and tells Liam: "You're not a monster. You're a werewolf. Like me." Afterwards, Liam is brought into the Pack, with Scott teaching him control and everything supernatural. In "I.E.D.", Liam faces off against his old school rival Brett Talbot during the lacrosse season's pre-season scrimmage. Scott and Stiles attempt keep him under control during the game, but they learn that their teammate Garrett is an assassin, and is targeting Brett who is also a Beta werewolf from a Pack of buddhist. Liam is then kidnapped by Garrett and dying of a wolfsbane laced wound. Liam remembers Scott's instruction on how to be a werewolf which gives him enough control to let out a howl allowing Scott to find and rescue him. Liam eventually develops enough control outside of the full moon. In "Time of Death", Scott tells him he doesn't have to get involved in the plan of catching the Benefactor if he doesn't want to. Liam decides he's not afraid and wants to help. Liam and Kira take on a Berserker, but they're overpowered with Liam terrified of the demons. Afterwards, Liam develops PTSD afterward, having hallucinations of the monsters. Later on with his price on the Dead Pool being spiked and the attempted assassination at the bonfire, the trauma and stress starts to get to him. Liam admits his fears to Scott, saying he's not like his Alpha, how he and the others put their lives on the line to save people. In "A Promise of the Dead", Liam continues to struggle, but gets help from Brett, his former rival roughing him to encourage him, and reminding him he is alive, snapping Liam out of his paranoia. Brett then tells Liam he's lucky to have Scott as his Alpha, because Scott is a True Alpha, meaning he earned his status. Liam is inspired upon hearing this, fully overcoming his fears. In "Smoke & Mirrors", it is the full moon, but Liam insists on coming to help save Scott. Liam manages to control himself when Stiles has him recite Satomi's mantra. When Scott is cursed as a Berserker by Kate Argent, Liam reaches Scott using Scott's same words: "You're not a monster. You're a werewolf. Like me". These words then breaks Kate's spell, and Liam sees Scott put away Peter after the murderous werewolf threatens him. In season 5A, Liam is still learning to perfect control under Scott's tutelage. In "Parasomnia", he learns, to his chagrin, his nemesis from grade school, Hayden has enrolled. The Pack has given him permission to let Mason in on the supernatural business. Though worried that his best friend would reject him, Liam attempts to do so. However, a full wolf (Theo) chases him and Mason, forcing Liam to fully expose himself to his best friend, but the latter is instead completely beside himself with awe. Liam tracks a Chimera at the club Sinema where Hayden works in "Condition Terminal", but he causes her to drop the shots she's carrying, to her annoyance. He later attempts to pay her back. Hayden coldly rebukes him, but he insists on making up for the shots, even more so when he learns the money is for her medication. Their relationship overtime begins to improve, with the two starting to fall for each other. Liam later discovers Hayden is a Chimera. He manages to convince her of the supernatural, and brings her to Scott's Pack in "Strange Frequencies" to protect her. Liam is furious, appalled at Scott's decision to use Hayden as bait, but has Scott promise that he'll do everything he can to save Hayden. Despite the Pack's efforts, the Dread Doctors abduct both Liam and Hayden, and while held captive, they comfort each other. Upon being rescued by Theo, Liam shares a kiss with Hayden, also activating his pain siphoning ability. After this, he and Hayden enter a romantic relationship, becoming lost in their own world. When Hayden is poisoned by the Dread Doctors in "Lies of Omission", Liam, overcome with worry, is tricked by Theo into thinking the Bite will save her. Liam demands Scott Bite Hayden, but a discouraged Scott says no, reasoning the Bite could actually kill her. In "Status Asthmaticus", Scott's refusal and the supermoon greatly feeding his bloodlust and temper, Liam is led by Theo to violently clash with Scott (who has been weakened by wolfsbane) and attempts to kill him to take his True Alpha powers so he can save Hayden himself. Liam comes close to killing Scott, but Mason arrives in time and snaps Liam out of his rage. Mason tells him of Hayden's death. Devastated, Liam gives Hayden a final kiss before she is taken by Parrish. In "The Last Chimera", Liam mulls over his misplaced, misguided actions, wracked with guilt for almost killing Scott and leaving Hayden for dead. He is however shaken when he discovers she is actually alive, having been brought back to life by Theo. Liam and a frosty Hayden confront each other over his leaving her to die to kill Scott, and she being in Theo's Pack after Theo manipulated Liam to kill Scott, and had killed Scott himself. In "Codominance", the two make up after Hayden tells him she can't die again for her sister's sake. Liam admits he can't bear for her to die again either and the two kiss. Later on they consummate their romance, but he continually pressures her to get away from Theo. In "The Sword and the Spirit", Liam attempts to locate the Dread Doctors' lair and runs into Scott. Liam guiltily admits to Scott he did something wrong in attempting to kill him and says he has to make things right for it, like he'd have to save Scott's life. Scott reassures him that Hayden is alive and is sure he'll get a chance. During the chaos caused by the Beast of Gévaudan, the Dread Doctors and Theo, Liam does everything he can to make things up to Scott, and his Alpha slowly comes to forgive him and accept him back into the Pack. In "A Credible Threat", during the charity lacrosse game with Devonford Prep, Liam is overjoyed when Hayden says she's taking his advice to stand with Scott's Pack because she wants to be with him. By the end of Season 5, the Pack puts an end to the Beast, Sebastien Valet, including saving Mason separating his best friend from the Beast's essence to Liam's relief and joy, and he and Hayden affirm their love after Hayden is willingly Bitten, made a Beta werewolf by Scott, sharing a kiss with her under the next full moon. In the season 6 premiere "Memory Lost", while on a date, Liam and Hayden find a car with no driver and a scared boy in the back. Liam and Mason investigate unusual compass readings leading them to the home of a missing couple. Liam, Hayden and Mason investigate the smell of blood in the school, it leads them to a dead body in the boiler room. In "Superposition", Liam is blunt with Mason about his distrust in Corey, he questions where Corey was when they fought Sebastien Valet or why he was loyal to Theo for such a long period of time. He says he'll trust Corey when he does something trustworthy. In "Sundowning", Liam takes charge of the situation with Gwen as Scott is preoccupied with other things. They trick her into going to a party at Scott's house. Shortly after Gwen arrived, the Ghost Riders appear. Liam and Corey are forced to fight, but they're no match for them. In "Relics", Liam is forced to take action as the Ghost Riders storm the sports field during a lacrosse game. He lunges at one of the Riders, knocking it off its horse and clawing at it. In "Ghosted", when Hayden's plan to trap a Ghost Rider is no longer an option, Liam devises a plan of his own. He insists they get Theo, doing so would allow them to use Theo's power. Liam drives Kira's sword into the ground, releasing Theo. He is disappointed to learn Theo no longer has the powers he stole from Josh and Tracy. He and Hayden then discover that Theo remembers Stiles, convincing them to keep Theo above ground. In "Heartless", Liam convinces Scott that Theo could help in stopping the Ghost Riders. He reminds Theo that he still has the sword, and if he becomes more trouble than he's worth, Liam will send him back. In "Blitzkrieg", Liam learns of Garrett Douglas' past from Theo and is stunned to learn that when Garrett escaped from the tube in the Dread Doctors' lair, he has the power of an Alpha, a Lowenmensch and a Ghost Rider. Liam becomes enraged as he is forced to watch Mason get taken by the Ghost Riders. He attacks the Ghost Rider at fault with such ferocity, despite being outmatched. He escapes after Hayden allows herself to be taken. In "Memory Found", Liam and Theo lure the Ghost Riders to the hospital in order to buy Scott, Lydia and Malia time to remember Stiles. Despite the odds stacked against him, Liam attacks and kills a few Ghost Riders with Theo's help. In "Riders on the Storm", Liam discovers parts of the phantom train station being merged with the real world. After Scott discovers a way to divert the train, Liam enters the rift by using one of the Ghost Riders' horses and is reunited with Mason and Hayden. They find Corey wired up in the radio room. Once he hears Scott's Roar, telling him that the train has been diverted, Liam helps Mason and Hayden rescue Corey which also rescues everyone else who had also been taken. In Teen Wolf: The Movie, Liam has opened up a ramen shop with his girlfriend Hikari (a kitsune), and is now holding the Nogitsune. Adrian Harris discovers the location of the Nogitsune through mysterious means, and is able to retrieve and release it after severely injuring both. He and Hikari later rejoin the group after Allison's revival (he is not a part of the ritual as he did not know her when she was alive). Both are defeated by the Oni and held in the illusion realm at the lacrosse stadium. Eventually, thanks to quick thinking from Hikari, Liam and the rest of the pack are released from their restraints and defeat the Oni. He is last seen with Hikari at Derek's funeral.

=== Noah Stilinski ===
Character	Portrayer	Season appearances		Supernatural classification
Character	Portrayer	Starring	Recurring/Guest	Supernatural classification
Noah Stilinski	Linden Ashby	6	1, 2, 3, 4, 5	Human
Linden Ashby Noah Stilinski (primarily referred to as Sheriff Stilinski) is Stiles's father and the sheriff of Beacon Hills. His first name is not known until season 6 where he intrudes on his father Elias Stilinski having a conversation with Scott and Lydia. Stilinski is close to Scott and Melissa. He is an intelligent and dedicated officer, although his ability to do his job is hampered by his initial unawareness, and later because of the supernatural forces behind many of the crimes in Beacon Hills. Stilinski and Stiles are mutually supportive and protective of one another, in part because of the death of Stiles' mother, Claudia, some years before the series timeline. In season 1, "Co-Captain", Stilinski links the murders committed by the Alpha to the Hale House fire. He discovers an accomplice in the arson, Adrian Harris, who gave him the lead to the culprit, a pendant. In the Season 1 finale, Stilinski finds the body of Kate Argent with the necklace, linking her to the crimes. In season 2, the Sheriff is again working on solving a killing spree. He is put on temporary leave because of Stiles' behavior throughout the season, straining his relationship with his son. With Stiles' help, he finds out the victims were part of the Beacon Hills High swim team in 2006. He is held hostage at the Sheriff's station with Melissa and their sons by Matt, when they uncover evidence convicting Matt. After the events are resolved and Matt's death, he is reinstated as Sheriff. In season 3, Stilinski has a murder spree on his hands, this time committed by the Darach. Stiles is reluctant to let his father in on the supernatural loop out of fear he could be killed. Eventually in the episode "The Girl Who Knew Too Much", he attempts to tell Stilinski the truth using previous seemingly inexplicable incidents, but Stilinski says he doesn't know what he's seen, harshly trying to end the argument. Stiles talks back, saying, "Mom would've believed me." Stilinski later uncovers information on a hunch about the supernatural and discovers Jennifer Blake about to kill Lydia. He witnesses Jennifer removing her glamour talent to reveal her actual face, the Darach, and Scott in his werewolf shape. Jennifer abducts him for the Guardians' sacrifice. He is held in the Nemeton along with Melissa McCall and Argent. He is now brought up to speed. In "Alpha Pact", Stilinski relays a story eight years ago when Claudia was on her deathbed. He was helping a girl who was caught in a car accident. He was holding the girl's hand and her grip tightened. She'd comforted him saying if his wife was dying, he should leave and go be with her. Ultimately, he didn't, waiting for paramedics to arrive instead. Claudia had already died when he arrived and Stiles had been with her. If he'd believed in the supernatural, believed that the girl psychically knew that Claudia was dying, he would've been with his wife in her final moments. He and the parents are rescued by Allison and Isaac just as Jennifer is using the storm to bury them. Stiles arrives holding up the ceiling of the root cellar with an aluminum bat and is reunited with his son. Finally brought into the supernatural circle, and subsequently closer to Stiles, Stilinski starts to search through old cases which he suspect could involve a supernatural creature, particularly the case of Malia Tate. He asks Scott to help him to find some clue in Malia's house, but this proves unsuccessful. Later, Stiles admits to Scott this action was his last attempt to solve some case when he's still the sheriff, since Rafael, Scott's father is having Stilinski impeached for a "lack of resolution and ability to close cases". However, with Scott and Stiles' help in the following episode "More Bad than Good", Malia Tate is found alive and he reunites her with her father and Stilinski closes the case. Stilinski temporarily puts his dislike of Rafael aside in "Riddled" when Rafael finds Stiles after he goes missing and shakes his hand in gratitude. Stilinski has been taking notes of Stiles' growing symptoms and has him undergo a test for the same disease that killed Claudia. When he sees a brain scan similar to his wife's, he is visibly shaken. However, later, Scott reveals to Stilinski Stiles is possessed by the dark trickster, the Nogitsune. Displaying belief in the supernatural, Stilinski clues in on the fact that the Kitsune is a trickster. He learns Stiles' MRI results are fake: they are virtually similar to his wife's results, courtesy of the Void Kitsune. He recalls his time in the army; he was taught that to defeat a foe, "you take away their hope". Rafael helps to talk Stilinski out of the impeachment case, saving his career and admits he only needed a reason to stay in Beacon Hills so he could make things up with Scott. Stilinski attempts to give Rafael some sound advice: that he reveal to Scott why he left. In "Insatiable", when he sees the Nogitsune has been exorcised from his son, he gives Stiles a tight hug. In season 4, Stilinski investigates the murders by the assassin, 'the Mute'. With Derek in tow, he is led to the school, where a Claymore mine is set up, but the assassin shows up. Derek and Stilinski overpower him, then Stilinski attempts to arrest him, but the assassin is killed by Peter. The Sheriff learns of the Dead Pool from Scott and Stiles; he has the hit list run through recognition to find the intended targets. Stilinski and Stiles are having money problems, trying to pay for the MRI and the "visit" to Eichen House which are both long overdue. Stiles is tempted to use the Dead Pool money Scott found to help solve the problems. Later on however, because Stiles was almost murdered by Brunski, their Eichen House bill is dropped as a gesture of apology. In the Season 4 finale, "Smoke and Mirrors", Stilinski saves Lydia and Mason from a Berserker using the Mute's Claymore, destroying the demon. In season 5, Stilinski is constantly given death threats from the delinquent Donovan Donati for his history with Donovan's father. Stiles notes his dad has taken off his wedding ring. In "Condition Terminal", Stilinski is against moving Tracy's shapeshifted corpse from a crime scene. Deaton counters he'd be holding a press conference announcing the existence of the supernatural. Stilinski stammers, with a growing frustration over having to obscure supernatural aspects in his cases, saying "There is a line we have to draw", but reluctantly acquiesces. Stilinski notices Stiles' uncharacteristic silence and withdrawal upon realizing Donovan is a Chimera. In "Strange Frequencies", he and Melissa uncover that all the known Chimeras had previous organ transplants from an unknown donor: they were all genetically chimeras beforehand. In "Ouroboros", when another unnamed Chimera is found dead, impaled upon Kira's sword, Stilinski culminates by resolutely reporting it with an APB out on Kira to the protest of Melissa, Stiles and Kira's parents. He vehemently argues the girl is murder, it is his job to investigate within the parameters of the law and although his son along with Scott's Pack combat threats outside the law, they're not above it. Melissa humors him writing an official report detailing all the supernatural phenomena present in the town, and sharply tells him "maybe (he) should learn to bend a little before someone else breaks." In "Lies of Omission", Stilinski sees Parrish has incarcerated himself because he's the one stealing the bodies. He considers letting it slide, but Parrish resolutely says no. In "Status Asthmaticus", Stilinski uncovers clues surrounding Donovan's death, but he's attacked then left to die by Theo. Stiles, horrified, manages to find Stilinski and the latter is hospitalized. Scott, Stiles and Malia uncover he'd been slashed, poisoned by Noah Patrick, a Berserker Chimera. The bone marrow poisoning him is removed by Geyer and Stilinski recovers, waking up and reassuring Stiles he "still has (him)". In "Damnatio Memoriae", Stilinski recovers from his near-death experience. He talks to Stiles about Donovan's death. Stilinski reassures and advises his son that his only crime was surviving, though his heart is telling him it was murder, and if a judge said differently "then hell with the judge." Stilinski admits he made a mistake in arresting Kira and says he's learning "to bend." Stilinski advises Stiles that the burden he now carries won't ever feel OK again without a counterbalance, like saving a life. He encourages Stiles to reconcile with Scott, saying he'll feel better by forgiving someone if not himself. Stilinski moves forward with his new mindset, keeping Parrish on as a deputy, despite growing increasingly concerned over Parrish's apocalyptic dream and the growing number of bodies committed by the Beast. In "Amplification", Stiles alerts him to the danger Lydia's in while in Eichen House. Stilinski talks to a resolutely oblivious Natalie Martin firmly telling her she knows the bigger picture of what's happening in Beacon Hills, giving her the records of Valack's experimentation at Eichen House and Melissa's "police report" as proof, which later leads to her finally acknowledging the supernatural. In "Apotheosis", the Beast is destroyed (with Mason separated) and the Desert Wolf defeated and captured by Malia and Braeden, Stilinski tells Stiles his role in making all of the above happen must have felt good. Stiles admits it did and he wants to feel it again. Stilinski proudly tells his son: "Welcome to your future career in law enforcement." In the season 6 premiere "Memory Lost", the Sheriff brings Scott in to help find out what happened to a boy's missing parents. After Stiles' encounter with a Ghost Rider, Stilinski doesn't recognise him. In "Superposition", the Sheriff and Parrish enter the station as they go over a recent case. His wife Claudia is alive as a result of the Ghost Riders' interference. She waits for him in his office. He asks if she's happy to which she says "Always". In "Sundowning", Stilinski tells Scott and Lydia that "Stiles" is not a thing, but a person. His father Elias was an army engineer and used the nickname Stiles. He denies Scott's request to see Elias as he would be no help to them due to his dementia. He later walks in on Scott, Lydia and Malia visiting Elias. Elias becomes agitated towards his son and tells him to go back to his "dead wife and loser son". The Sheriff later tells Scott that he remembers back in college, he and Claudia were discussing their future including having a son named Stiles. In "Relics", Stilinski gives Lydia permission to search his house for any possible relics of Stiles. He tells her that he couldn't sleep the night before, he got up to do some paperwork but he stubs his toe on an old baseball bat and, without thinking, he yells out Stiles' name. In "Radio Silence", the Sheriff doesn't know how the jeep ended up in the school car park, he admits the vehicle was a junker in the day, but doesn't understand who would want it now. In "Ghosted", the Sheriff refuses to acknowledge the possibility that Stiles is his son and that he was taken by the Ghost Riders. He believes the person Scott heard on the radio could've been the result of signal crossing. He later talks to Claudia that someone should write a paper on how she survived the frontotemporal dementia, but she shoots him down and instead talks about replacing the wallpaper Lydia had damaged. In "Heartless", Stilinski discovers what he believes to be Stiles' bedroom. He asks Claudia why it was sealed off. She just says there are several simple explanations for the room and tells him to "leave it alone" but he cannot. He begins to think that maybe what Scott and Lydia have been telling him was true. Lydia gives him the first clue that he has a son by spotting Stiles' lacrosse jersey in the room and tossing it to him. In "Blitzkrieg", the Sheriff starts piecing together that he has a son by running string to the walls of Stiles' room, causing Stiles' possessions to reappear. He later tries to show Claudia Stiles' room full of Stiles' stuff but she sees nothing. He then realises that Claudia isn't real as he can't remember her last birthday or anniversary. Claudia tries to fill his head with false memories but he persists, remembering her "last good day" at the hospital. Once he remembers Stiles, Claudia disappears. The Sheriff tells the Pack that he has a son, his name is Mieczyslaw Stilinski but they call him Stiles. He remembers everything about his son, everything from his first time behind the jeep to him dragging Scott into the woods. In "Memory Found", Stilinski is shot and erased by the Ghost Riders as he exits the Sheriff's station. In "Riders on the Storm", the Sheriff is briefly reunited with Stiles before giving him cover so that Stiles could escape. He later saves Stiles from the conjured up Claudia. After the Ghost Riders leave Beacon Hills and everyone is saved, the Sheriff is back at the station with all his deputies. In Teen Wolf: The Movie, Stilinski is still the Chief of the BHPD, now working closely with Derek as a consultant on supernatural cases. Ironically, while his relationship with Derek is great, he is constantly at odds with Derek's son Eli (in part due to Eli repeatedly stealing his son's prized Jeep that he left in Beacon Hills). He starts the film investigating mysterious fires with Derek, Deputy Parrish, and Mason (now a police officer himself). When asked if he would like to bring his son in for help, he refuses, stating that he has, "his own problems", to deal with. He discovers the return of Allison, the Nogitsune, and the Oni, but decides to focus on the mysterious fires instead, figuring that they are connected and that it is best for the pack to handle the supernatural threat. He is sent to the Nogitsune's illusion in the lacrosse stadium by the Oni along with Mason. In the final battle, he is able to defeat Oni with assistance from Chris (who provides silver bullets to the police). After Derek's death, he gives the Jeep to Eli, knowing that while his father's relationship with the vehicle wasn't the best, he was secretly repairing it for his son, showing how much he loved him.

=== Melissa McCall ===
Character	Portrayer	Season appearances		Supernatural classification
Character	Portrayer	Starring	Recurring/Guest	Supernatural classification
Melissa McCall	Melissa Ponzio	6	1, 2, 3, 4, 5	Human
Melissa Ponzio Melissa McCall (née Delgado) is Scott's overworked, cynical but comforting and loving mother. Melissa is close friends with Stilinski and is like a surrogate mother to Stiles. Melissa works as a nurse at Beacon Hills Memorial Hospital. Scott is very close to her, since her ex-husband Rafael is absent. From Season 2's end onwards, Melissa is in the know of Scott's werewolf status. She becomes closer to him, participating and helping her son in his missions to protect Beacon Hills, serving as his moral tether and role model. In "Formality", Melissa helps Scott get ready for the school formal and tells him "Women love words", giving her son the confidence he needs to tell Allison both he loves her, and that he's a werewolf. In season 2, "Abomination", Melissa's life is inconspicuously threatened by Gerard Argent to blackmail Scott into following his orders. Scott complies, though Melissa notices his distress right afterward. Scott lies to her, saying everything's fine. In "Restraint" after Jackson files a restraining order against Scott and Stiles, Melissa angrily confronts Scott over all of his bizarre behavior. She concernedly asks are his actions because of his absent father. To keep her in the dark, Scott affirms this. In "Fury", Melissa is called to the sheriff's station as a witness, but as she arrives she sees Matt Daehler shoot Scott in the stomach and is horrified. Melissa is held hostage with Stilinski. Melissa comes into contact with the supernatural, witnessing a shapeshifted Derek Hale fight the Kanima, and finally sees Scott as a werewolf. At first, she is horrified, devastated, having trouble coping. She avoids Scott for a week and is even more frightened when Gerard breaks into the house and has the Kanima hold her hostage. Eventually, Melissa comes to accept Scott for his new identity, and encourages him to help others with his abilities. In season 3, Melissa is closer to Scott having come to terms with his world, assisting him whenever possible, attempting to smuggle Isaac out when he's committed to the hospital and helping Stiles identify a new killer in Beacon Hills by allowing him access to the morgue. In the episode, "The Overlooked", during the evacuation of the hospital because of a storm, Melissa finds Ethan and Aiden in their merged form attacking Scott. She saves her son by electrocuting them with a defibrillator. She helps Scott the others with their plan to help Jennifer, the Darach, escape the Alphas (Jennifer had poisoned Cora and kidnapped Stilinski for leverage), but Jennifer double-crosses them and kidnaps Melissa. Melissa is later held in the Nemeton along with Stiles' and, later, Allison's father for the final sacrifice, Guardians. In "Lunar Ellipse", she and the other parents are rescued by Isaac, Allison and Stiles. Like Scott she is not happy with her ex-husband, Rafael back in town. In "Anchors", Melissa, along with Scott, is angry when Rafael conducts a case for impeachment in his attempt to fire Sheriff Stilinski. Right afterward she realizes Scott is about to lose control of his wolf side. More used to the supernatural, she helps him regain control by telling tell him to "be his own anchor", as Allison was his anchor and they've parted which Scott manages to do. After that she comforts and promises him that people fall in love more than once. Melissa has also had the McCall residence installed with ash wood base boards with Deaton's help to work as wards against supernatural intruders which she arms when the Oni attack the house. Mellisa, Stilinski and Scott's issues with Rafael are revealed in "Insatiable": when they were married, Rafael used to be a heavy drinker. One time, when Scott was only a toddler, Rafael came home drunk and had accidentally knocked Scott down the stairs bruising his head on the floor and she'd kicked Rafael out. Stilinski had answered the domestic distress call, exacerbating spite from Rafael. In the Season 3 finale, the hospital is attacked by the Oni, and Melissa makes Rafael promise her, if she doesn't make it, he is to make things up with Scott. Melissa is saved when the Nogitsune is defeated. Melissa comforts her son when he finally has time to mourn Allison's death. During Season 4, because of all the antecedent damage done to the hospital, Melissa is late in paying her bills for the house, forcing her in having to make double shifts at the hospital. She calculates the cost of the budget to learn how long before she and Scott could lose their house. Scott, worried for Melissa, hides the duffel bag full of Dead Pool money, paid to the assassin Garrett, in his room, hoping it could solve their financial crunch. In "Time of Death", Melissa takes part in Scott's plan to have Scott fake his death to catch the Benefactor. She hates the plan when told Scott will die for real if Kira doesn't shock him again within the next 45 minutes. Melissa snaps at Noshiko asking why are they letting their kids handle these dangers. Noshiko answers that they'd be asking them to "run and hide for the rest of their lives" otherwise. Melissa finds the Dead Pool money in "A Promise to the Dead", and confronts Scott, saying while he can "save lives", he can't save people "from life", convincing her son to return the money to the Hales. In season 5, "Condition Terminal", Melissa calls Scott to the hospital where a patient named Corey is in relentless pain so Scott can siphon the pain. Scott and Melissa store the Chimera Lucas' corpse in the morgue after the Dread Doctors kill him. Scott mulls that he "should have done something". Melissa says his grandfather had a saying; when one says "I should have" too much, then "You're should-ing all over yourself." She says she wishes she could be the mother to say Scott can't be involved in the danger of Beacon Hills because he's always going to be at the center of it all, and because he cares. She asks him the foremost question: what is he going to do. Scott replies he'll find out whoever murdered Lucas and stop them. In "Ouroboros", when Stilinski sticks to the law putting out an APB on Kira when her sword is found in the body of a dead Chimera in spite of the world they now live in, Melissa slaps him in the face for it, sharply telling him, "Maybe you should learn to bend a little, before some else breaks." In "Status Asthmaticus", after Scott is killed by Theo Raeken, Melissa persistently applies CPR. She screams for her son to roar to bring himself back: it works and Scott is revived, roaring. Melissa treats and comforts her defeated son. Melissa tells Scott his friends will come back to him, and advises him to bring and give everyone and his Pack hope. In "The Last Chimera", Melissa comforts a distraught Stiles over Stilinski's injuries and attempts to help Geyer keep Stilinski from dying. She learns from Stiles the Sheriff's being poisoned by bone marrow. She manages to convince Geyer to perform surgery to remove the piece of bone: it works and successfully saves Stilinski' life. In "Amplification", Melissa conducts and oversees the evacuation of the hospital to Hill Valley in time before the Beast of Gévaudan arrives at the building. In "The Beast of Beacon Hills", Melissa looks up Mason's medical records after the reveal he is the host for the Beast and reveals new information to Lydia and Stiles: Mason is genetically a chimera because he'd absorbed his twin while still an unborn fetus accounting for him having two sets of DNA. Melissa asserts that this information sounds "just bizarre enough to sound like it might be important." In "Apotheosis", Melissa, not caring she could be fired, gives an injured Lydia a shot of cortisone to the throat to allow her limited use of her voice, her banshee voice, so Lydia can Scream Mason's name to save him, separate him from the Beast. In season 6A "Sundowning", Melissa sneaks Argent into the morgue at the hospital in order for him to take a look at a recent murder victim. Upon further examination, she realizes that the murder victim is missing his pineal gland, which is said to house the soul. In "Relics", Melissa follows Argent in the woods as he hunts for the werewolf that's been killing people. She decided to join him because she's sick of seeing people she cares about getting hurt. They find two cyclists with their heads caved in. Melissa is later approached by Lydia and Natalie who want her to show them Claudia Stilinski's medical records. The records show Claudia never had children but did have frontotemporal dementia "10 years ago". Melissa is shocked Claudia is still alive and thinks it's a miracle. In "Ghosted", in order to save Argent's life, Melissa secretly moves him down to an abandoned storage room. She mixes together nine herbs to counter-act the nine toxins that are poisoning him, and uses the herbs to heal him. In "Heartless", Melissa informs Malia that Peter is dying. She reminds Malia that Peter is ruthless and always has a plan to hurt everyone around him. She injects Peter with a syringe containing the nine herbs which heals him. In "Blitzkrieg", Melissa agrees to take Garrett Douglas to Deputy Parrish in order to save Argent. On arrival at the bunker, she pleads with Parrish to awaken but he doesn't and she's erased. In "Riders on the Storm", Melissa and Argent attempt to escape the Wild Hunt as it's being merged with the real world. After Argent kills two Ghost Riders, Melissa kisses him before they leave. After the Ghost Riders leave and everyone in Beacon Hills are saved, Melissa treats Corey with the nine herbs. In Teen Wolf: The Movie, Melissa is still living in Beacon Hills and working at the hospital (it is implied by her attire that she is now a doctor). It also implied that Chris and her are no longer together. She treats Allison after she is brought back to life (initially thinking that the girl brought in just happens to look like Allison), and later Derek at her home after he is severely injured by Allison with a wolfsbane-laced arrow. When Scott decides that he will have to kill Allison (believing that who they brought back is not the Allison they know), Melissa tells him that if by some chance it is her, he must do everything in his power to bring her back. She, Peter, and Chris later track down Scott and Allison after discovering him and Eli were being hunted by him. She does not participate in the final battle and is last seen at Derek's funeral.

=== Chris Argent ===
Character	Portrayer	Season appearances		Supernatural classification
Character	Portrayer	Starring	Recurring/Guest	Supernatural classification
Chris Argent	J.R. Bourne (adult); Max Lloyd-Jones (teen)	6	1, 2, 3, 4, 5	Human
J.R. Bourne Christopher "Chris" Argent (primarily referred to as simply Argent) is Allison's father and a werewolf-hunter veteran. Argent is a strong willed, stern man, and while initially hostile towards werewolves having been born and indoctrinated into his family's cause, Argent has a sense of honor and a moral compass. Unlike most of the Argents, he sticks to the Hunter's Code not believing in killing the innocent and wishes to instead provide a symbol of protection for people against supernatural creatures and truly loves his family, wanting the best for Allison, being overprotective of her. In season 1, Argent is antagonistic towards Derek Hale, and is suspicious of Scott due to his being Allison's boyfriend. Argent eventually learns Scott is another Beta werewolf, but later that Kate has revealed their secret life to Allison, to his fury. Argent locates Stiles and Jackson for Scott's whereabouts but the former instead tells him Kate orchestrated the Hale fire. He then confronts Kate and fires a warning shot to have her take her gun off of Scott. In season 2, after Kate and Peter's deaths, Argent forces Allison to end her romance with Scott by holding Scott at gunpoint to prove his point. His father, Gerard then arrives afterward to declare war, despite his protests. Argent begins Allison's training to be a hunter but grudgingly keeps Scott safe for her sake. In "Raving", Argent confronts Allison over her knowledge of the murders committed by the Kanima explaining to her that because they know of the supernatural, it is the hunters' job to protect the human norms from them. When Victoria is Bitten, Argent is conflicted over it while Gerard endorses her suicide and Victoria ultimately decides to go through with it to obey the Hunter's Code. She asks Argent to help her commit suicide when she can't do it alone, to his devastation and remorse. He desperately tries to comfort Allison upon her learning the news. In "Fury", Argent is reluctant to let Allison take charge of the family. He eventually follows her lead but becomes upset, horrified when she falls under Gerard's influence. After she almost murders Erica and Boyd out of rage, Argent saves their lives, horrified by the person she's becoming. Realizing Gerard is the enemy in "Master Plan", Argent defects from his family's crusade, sets Erica and Boyd free and allies with Scott and Derek, putting aside their differences, to stop Gerard. When Gerard comes out with his plan all along was to get the Bite to cure his cancer, having the Kanima threaten Allison's life to this end, Argent is incensed at his father's betrayal after he'd pushed for Victoria's suicide all while what he was planning to do and now threatening Allison's life, branding his father a monster. After Scott puts an end to Gerard, Argent is now on more reasonable terms with him and comforts a devastated Allison. In season 3A, Argent and Allison have retired from hunting to stay out of supernatural affairs. In "Fireflies", Scott goes to him for help in stopping Cora and Boyd when they are under the influence of the full moon. Argent initially refuses saying Scott's world "decimated his". After seeing a supposed victim of their rampage however, he relents assisting Scott, Derek, and Isaac, in finding and capturing them. Despite saying that he has retired, Argent starts getting involved with the Alpha Pack situation in "Motel California" and is revealed to have been hunting the Darach for some time and knows also about Allison's continued involvement. Argent has also grown more supportive and compromising towards Allison's relationships with her supernatural friends. When Jennifer names him as the final sacrifice, Argent hands himself over to keep his daughter safe and is kidnapped by her. He is held in the Nemeton along with Scott's mother and Stiles's father, all three being Guardians of their children for the final sacrifice. Argent and the other parents are eventually rescued by his daughter, Isaac and Stiles. He decides to re-work the Code with Allison in the mid-Season 3 finale and "protect those who cannot protect themselves", since the Nemeton had been revitalized. During Season 3B, when the Oni appear in Beacon Hills, Argent relays a tale to the group in "Silverfinger". 24 years earlier, at the age of 18, Gerard had Argent conduct his first gun deal leaving out the fact that the customers were Yakuza. During the meeting, three Oni appeared and went after the Yakuza boss, the kumichō, who was supernatural, possessed by a Nogitsune. Argent had survived and saved the life of a man called "Silverfinger" by shooting one of the Oni directly in the face, shattering its mask. Argent and Derek also come to solve their differences in "Letharia Vulpina", when Derek saves his life, shielding Argent from the blast of a bomb, and after Derek is freed from the Nogitsune possession in "De-Void", Argent tells Derek he's not his enemy anymore. In the penultimate episode of Season 3, when he shows Allison how to cast a silver arrowhead to graduate as a hunter, Allison takes the time to tell Argent she loves him and she's proud of what they've accomplished. Argent later arrives at the Oak Creek camp and sees that Allison has been killed. In "The Divine Move", Argent feels devastation, but knows how to deal with it saying he has the capacity and a skill to compartmentalize his emotions. He actually comforts Isaac over the latter's sorrow. Isaac figures out that Allison wanted Scott to tell him that she had destroyed the Oni with her silver arrowhead. He has Argent recall his first deal where he'd shot off an Oni's mask; Argent had fired a silver bullet, but the bullet must have gone through and through: silver is a poison to the Oni. They come to the school and destroy the remaining Oni with the arrowheads avenging Allison. Argent leaves Beacon Hills for France with Isaac in tow to permanently put away the Nogitsune trapped in the triskele urn and to help each other come to terms with the death of his daughter. In season 4 "The Benefactor", Argent returns to Beacon Hills after receiving Scott's text telling him Kate is alive and in Beacon Hills. Argent arrives just in time to help Scott corral and subdue Liam. While apparently dealing with Allison's death, determined to honor her by upholding her Code and resolved to protect her loved ones during the Dead Pool situation, Argent is shown to be desolate, harboring immense grief. He receives a visit from the Calaveras who come to enlist him in hunting Kate, intending to have Argent return to the ways of the hunter. In "A Promise to the Dead", Argent tracks Kate's Berserkers to the sewers, but he's captured by Peter. The werewolf pegs Argent to the sewer wall through a rebar, then bends it, trapping him. He is found by Parrish but eventually Argent tells Parrish to just leave him, to warn Scott about Peter and Kate, and gives into his pain, fatigue and ultimately grief, telling Parrish, "I've got nothing left". Parrish refuses, telling Argent he knows about Allison, and how she felt about Scott. He enthralls Argent to use anger over how Allison would feel if Scott were in danger, and Argent eventually breaks free. In "Smoke and Mirrors" Argent and Parrish, along with the Calaveras arrive at La Iglesia and face off against Kate and her Berserker. Argent subdues Kate, shooting her with a yellow monkshood laced bullet. Kate defends her actions telling Argent that Scott and his friends killed Allison. Argent firmly tells Kate that Allison died saving her friends' lives. Argent tearfully admits he won't kill his sister, but wonders is she even worth saving. When Kate escapes, Argent leaves with the Calaveras to hunt her down as his part of a deal he eventually made with them; in exchange they have to leave Scott's Pack in peace. In season 5B "The Last Chimera", Argent returns to Beacon Hills as backup called by Scott, helping the latter, Stiles and Malia escape from the Dread Doctors. In "Damnatio Memoriae", Argent visits Gerard admittedly knowing he needs his father's knowledge and experience. In contempt, Argent hands his crippled father yellow monkshood which heals Gerard of his ailment. Argent questions him on the Dread Doctors knowing his father has information. Gerard replies the para-scientists' success is a resurrected werewolf that's actually connected to their family: the Beast of Gévaudan. In "The Sword and the Spirit", Argent and Gerard track the Beast and uncover the operating theatre of the Dread Doctors. Argent shows Scott (who is affronted by his decision to heal and recruit Gerard) the fresco depicting the Beast fighting a creature called a hellhound with bodies littered below the fray - bodies of citizens of Beacon Hills. Argent and Gerard then visit Parrish and confirm he's a hellhound. In "The Maid of Gévaudan", Argent and Lydia hear the story of his ancestor, Marie-Jeanne Valet from Gerard and also learn of the only means of killing the Beast: the mystical Pike Marie-Jeanne used to slay him in the eighteenth century. He and Gerard set out to find the weapon along with Parrish who is now able to consciously tap into his powers. They recover the Pike which has been re-forged into the same cane that was carried and used by the Surgeon. In "Apotheosis", the Argents lure the Beast, Sebastien Valet, into the sewers for the final showdown. Argent gives Parrish a pep talk to give the latter the confidence he needs to take on the Beast in repentance for Parrish saving his life. As events come to a close, with all the pieces in place, Argent comes out with his and Scott's own plan to double cross Gerard, passing the Pike to Scott. Everyone knew his father's only purpose would only be serving his own ends than saving people, shooting his father, disabling him. After the Beast is destroyed, Argent once again severs all ties with Gerard without hesitation. In season 6A "Sundowning", after seeing a murder victim in the morgue, Argent informs Melissa that the body found in the school wasn't the first victim. There are several others, all of which are missing the pineal gland, which Melissa says houses the soul. Argent suspects the attacker was a werewolf who is stealing souls. In "Relics", Argent and Melissa search the woods for the werewolf responsible for the recent murders. They finds 2 more victims with their heads caved in. Argent offers to help Malia gain control as she almost killed him and Melissa the night before. He tells her that he saw the look of blood lust on Kate's face years prior. He believes that if he'd done something, then maybe Kate wouldn't be a monster. He is later injured by the Ghost Riders while trying to protect several people who saw the Ghost Riders at Scott's house. In "Ghosted", Argent is dying as a toxin quickly spreads throughout his body. The Ghost Riders' whip infects its victims with a supernatural toxin. He requests Melissa to mix together 9 herbs to counter-act the toxin. In "Blitzkrieg", upon bringing Garrett Douglas to the bunker, Argent grabs a nearby shotgun, shooting him several times. This doesn't do much damage. He apologises to Melissa before he is erased. In "Riders on the Storm", Argent and Melissa try to find a way out of the Wild Hunt. Argent kills a Ghost Rider with its own gun. He then faces another in a standoff with Argent quickly pulling the trigger. After everyone is saved from the Wild Hunt, Argent accompanies Melissa and Mason as Melissa treats Corey's injuries with the 9 herbs. In Teen Wolf: The Movie, Chris finds Scott and Deaton in Los Angeles, searching for their help in bringing Allison back to life. Many things are revealed throughout the movie about what has been happening to Chris since the end of the series and prior; he is no longer in a relationship with Melissa (it is implied it wasn't on the best of terms), and since Allison's death he has seen fleeting visions of her that since the beginning of the film have magnified (similarly to Scott). He provides Scott one of the pieces needed for Allison's revival (the sword that killed her). It is later revealed that this was the plan of the Nogitsune, and that it had possessed him in its fly form since its release; Deaton is able to see through the trickery and expel it from Chris's body. After seeing Allison returned and attack civilians at the hospital, he quickly comes to terms with the idea that his daughter was not brought back and that what was must die. This is later revealed to be a ruse, and after reaching the Nogitsune's realm, he supplies the pack with silver weaponry to defeat the Oni. He is last seen at Derek's funeral.
