= Teen Wolf season 4 =

Teen Wolf
- Season 4
- DVD cover
- Starring: Tyler Posey; Dylan O'Brien; Tyler Hoechlin; Holland Roden; Shelley Hennig; Arden Cho
- No. of episodes: 12

Release
- Original network: MTV
- Original release: June 23 – September 8, 2014

Season chronology
- ← Previous; Season 3 Next → Season 5

The fourth season of Teen Wolf, an American supernatural drama created by Jeff Davis, premiered on June 23, 2014. The series was renewed for a fourth season of 12 episodes on October 12, 2013.

== Plot ==
Two months after the end of Season 3 and still healing from tragic losses (Allison, Boyd, Erica and Aiden), Scott (Tyler Posey), Stiles (Dylan O'Brien), Lydia (Holland Roden) and Kira (Arden Cho) return to a new semester of school with more human worries than supernatural, while also trying to help their new friend, Malia (Shelley Hennig), integrate back into society. But Kate Argent's (Jill Wagner) surprising resurrection brings a new threat to Beacon Hills along with the emergence of another mysterious enemy known simply as the Benefactor. Scott must also uphold the responsibility of his first Beta werewolf, Liam Dunbar (Dylan Sprayberry).

== Cast ==
=== Main ===
- Tyler Posey as Scott McCall
- Dylan O'Brien as Stiles Stilinski
- Tyler Hoechlin as Derek Hale
- Holland Roden as Lydia Martin
- Shelley Hennig as Malia Tate
- Arden Cho as Kira Yukimura

=== Recurring ===
- Linden Ashby as Sheriff Stilinski
- Ian Bohen as Peter Hale
- Dylan Sprayberry as Liam Dunbar
- Meagan Tandy as Braeden
- Ryan Kelley as Deputy Jordan Parrish
- Orny Adams as Bobby Finstock
- J.R. Bourne as Chris Argent
- Jill Wagner as Kate Argent
- Melissa Ponzio as Melissa McCall
- Khylin Rhambo as Mason Hewitt
- Cody Saintgnue as Brett Talbot
- Seth Gilliam as Dr. Alan Deaton
- Tom Choi as Ken Yukimura
- Maya Eshet as Meredith Walker
- Mason Dye as Garrett
- Matthew Del Negro as Agent Rafael McCall
- Samantha Logan as Violet
- Tamlyn Tomita as Noshiko Yukimura
- Lily Mariye as Satomi Ito
- Susan Walters as Natalie Martin
- Joseph Gatt as the Mute
- Ivonne Coll as Araya Calavera
- Ivo Nandi as Severo Calavera
- Aaron Hendry as Brunski
- Rahnuma Panthaky as Ms. Fleming
- Ian Nelson as young Derek Hale
- John Posey as Dr. Fenris
- Steven Brand as Dr. Valack

== Episodes ==
No. overall	No. in season	Title	Directed by	Written by	Original release date	US viewers (millions)
49	1	"The Dark Moon"	Russell Mulcahy	Jeff Davis	June 23, 2014	2.18
Scott and his friends head into Mexico, looking for the Spanish hunter clan, known as the Calaveras, that were hunting Derek. The lead hunter, Araya, makes Scott realize that Kate Argent, Allison's presumed dead aunt, has returned and taken Derek. With assistance from Braeden, Scott and the group go in search of Derek in an abandoned town known as La Iglesia, said to be the home of supernatural creatures called the Nagual (werejaguars). When Stiles's jeep breaks down, Scott and Braeden carry on alone. They arrive in La Iglesia and enter an abandoned church buried beneath the town, but are attacked by a mysterious creature wearing bone armor. Meanwhile, a second creature attacks Malia and Kira in the desert. Both groups manage to escape their attackers, and Scott and Braeden find a teenage version of Derek buried in the church.
50	2	"117"	Christian Taylor	Eoghan O'Donnell	June 30, 2014	1.55
Years earlier, Peter teaches Derek how to control his shift, using an artifact known as the Triskelion. In the present day, Kate kills a gas station attendant, and appears to be unable to control herself when transformed. Scott and his friends return from Mexico and take Derek to Deaton, who is baffled by Derek's regression. Derek attacks Deaton and goes to his destroyed house, but is arrested. When Kate abducts Derek from Scott's house, Scott teams up with Peter to put an end to Kate's plan. Peter identifies the creatures that attacked Scott as Berserkers. Kate and Derek access the Hale family's vault under the high school, and Kate wants the Triskelion in order to learn control. Scott, Malia and Kira take on the Berserkers, but are defeated. Peter confronts Derek and Kate in the vault. Derek leaves to help Scott, while Peter explains that the Triskelion was only ever a trinket. With Derek gone, Peter and Kate fight, but are interrupted when an individual blinds them and steals a briefcase. Kate flees and Derek reverts to his normal age. Stiles and Lydia find Peter, and he reveals that 117 million dollars were stolen.
51	3	"Muted"	Tim Andrew	Alyssa Clark	July 7, 2014	1.55
Sean Walcott, a seemingly ordinary teenager, is attacked by a mouthless assassin known as the Mute; the Mute slaughters his family, but Sean is able to escape. Stiles and Scott meet a new freshman, Liam (Dylan Sprayberry), who excels on the lacrosse field; worried that their positions on the lacrosse team are in jeopardy, Stiles persuades Scott to use his werewolf abilities again on the field. Scott begins excelling again, but accidentally injures Liam. Deputy Parrish and Lydia investigate Sean's house, where they find a hidden meat locker full of frozen human corpses. Sean, identified as a wendigo, kills and eats one of the cops protecting him and takes Liam hostage on the hospital roof. Scott is forced to bite Liam to keep him from falling off of the roof, saving his life. The Mute kills Sean, and Scott realizes that his bite may have turned Liam into a werewolf.
52	4	"The Benefactor"	Russell Mulcahy	Jeff Davis & Ian Stokes	July 14, 2014	1.72
Peter is attacked and injured by the Mute. Scott and his friends attempt to plan a way to help Liam deal with the upcoming full moon. Deputy Parrish, Sheriff Stilinski and Derek discover that the Mute is an assassin hired by someone called the Benefactor. Scott and his friends lock up Liam and Malia at Lydia's lake house; unfortunately, Liam texted his friends that there was a party at the house. Lydia deals with the party, and discovers a soundproofed room in her house. Derek and Sheriff Stilinski locate the Mute at the high school, and avoid a claymore mine that the Mute planted. Peter eventually appears and kills the Mute. Stiles is able to help Malia gain control over her shift. Liam escapes, but Scott is able to subdue him with help from Chris Argent. At the party, a werewolf is killed by Violet, an agent of the Benefactor, along with her boyfriend Garrett. Lydia manages to decipher the code in the Mute's computer, using the keyword "ALLISON", which reveals that it's actually a "dead pool", a hit list of supernatural beings living in Beacon Hills, which includes all of their supernatural friends.
53	5	"I.E.D."	Jennifer Lynch	Angela L. Harvey	July 21, 2014	1.61
Violet and Garrett kill another werewolf at the school, and then prepare to take down their next target during the first lacrosse scrimmage. Malia tries to help Lydia use her powers to find the next cipher key, but when Lydia is unsuccessful, they decide to contact Meredith Walker – another banshee from Eichen House. Derek reveals to Chris that he is losing his powers. Scott, Stiles and Kira spend the game attempting to keep Liam safe, assuming that he is the assassins' target; however, Brett, a player from Liam's old school, is revealed to be a werewolf, and turns out to be Violet and Garrett's target. With help from Meredith, Lydia is able to decipher the second code, using the codeword "AIDEN", and is shocked to discover that the deadpool includes Deputy Parrish. Violet uses Brett as bait and tries to take down Scott, but he effortlessly overpowers her.
54	6	"Orphaned"	Russell Mulcahy	Jeff Davis	July 28, 2014	1.56
Agent McCall recognizes Violet as a member of the Orphans, a group of teenage serial killers. Garrett attacks and poisons Liam, throws him into a well, and forces Scott to help him free Violet. However, Kate and the Berserkers have already abducted Violet, and Garrett is killed. Derek recruits Malia in an attempt to find the pack of the werewolves who have been killed by the assassins. Lydia, Stiles and Deputy Parrish go to Eichen House in an attempt to get Meredith's help in finding the last cipher key. She refuses, saying that the Benefactor has ordered her not to help them. Scott and Chris face off against Kate and the Berserkers, but are overpowered; during the fight, Scott discovers that Violet has been killed. Derek and Malia find Satomi's pack, only to discover that they are all dead. Liam howls a distress call to Scott, who is able to hear it and rescues Liam. Lydia deciphers the last part of the list, which includes Liam, Malia and Meredith. Scott and Stiles find the money that Garrett and Violet received from the Benefactor. Peter offers to teach Kate to control her shift.
55	7	"Weaponized"	Tim Andrew	Alyssa Clark	August 4, 2014	1.75
Derek rushes an injured Braeden to the hospital. A virus designed to kill werewolves is released during the PSATs, and the school is quarantined. Deaton is confronted by Satomi at the animal clinic; she explains that most of her pack have been wiped out by the virus, and she was the only one who was immune. After conducting an autopsy on a werewolf, Deaton figures out that the virus is a version of canine distemper. With help from Satomi and Derek, they realize that Reishi tea leaves are the cure, and that there is a jar of them in the Hale vault. Scott, Malia and Kira are dying due to the virus, and hide in the vault to avoid the assassin. Stiles discovers that an assassin, a teacher overseeing the PSATs, is responsible for unleashing the virus. Agent McCall saves Stiles by shooting the teacher, who was about to kill Stiles. Using the last of his strength, Scott finds the tea leaves and breaks the jar, releasing the spores, which cures the virus. Malia walks away from the others after discovering that she is Peter's daughter.
56	8	"Time of Death"	Jann Turner	Angela L. Harvey	August 11, 2014	1.68
For their plan to lure out the Benefactor, Scott is put into a near-death state by Kira, brought in to the hospital, and declared dead, and his friends have 45 minutes before he dies permanently. Derek reveals to Braeden that he lost all of his powers; Braeden teaches him how to use guns and fight without his abilities. Scott experiences repeated hallucinations in which Liam urges him to embrace his werewolf nature, and tries to convince him that he can kill the assassins. In separate hallucinations, Liam fails to convince Scott and is killed by the Mute, and Scott ultimately kills Liam with the Mute's tomahawk. Malia seeks out Peter to get information about her family, especially her biological mother; Peter says that he is trying to locate the "Desert Wolf". Kate and the Berserkers break into the hospital in an attempt to confirm whether Scott is dead, but Chris persuades her to leave; however, Kira's mother becomes injured. Lydia discovers information that suggests her grandmother was a banshee. Lydia discovers that her grandmother wrote down part of the deadpool code and finds another message in the same code.
57	9	"Perishable"	Jennifer Lynch	Eric Wallace	August 18, 2014	1.48
Parrish is attacked and burned alive by his partner, only to survive, which brings him into the supernatural world. Scott, Derek, Lydia and Parrish realize that the deadpool is available to anyone. Lydia explains her grandmother's history; she spent many years researching numerous different subjects in an attempt to learn about her powers. One of her subjects was Meredith, but the tests seriously injured Meredith, forcing her to spend a year in hospital. Stiles and Lydia figure out that the coded message written by Lydia's grandmother was another list of names; they realize that all of the names belonged to deceased patients at Eichen House. Stiles and Lydia go to Eichen House for the files, but are attacked by the head orderly. Scott, Liam and Malia attend the annual lacrosse bonfire, but it turns out to be a trap; the music distorts their senses and makes them sick, allowing the guards, who were working with Parrish's partner, to ambush them. Derek and Braeden rescue them, and Parrish saves Stiles and Lydia from Brunski, and shoots him. Meredith enters the room, still alive, and reveals that she is the Benefactor.
58	10	"Monstrous"	J. D. Taylor	Jeff Davis & Ian Stokes	August 24, 2014	1.44
Kira saves Brett Talbot and another werewolf named Lori from a team of hunters. Scott races to the Clinic, reunites with Kira and meets Satomi and her pack. Lydia tries to get Meredith to talk, but she will only talk to Peter, who reads her mind to find out how she knows him. Lydia discovers that during her stay in the hospital, Meredith was placed in the same room as Peter, and involuntarily listened to Peter's thoughts and plans. When Meredith heard Lydia's scream when Allison was killed, she decided to carry out Peter's plan; Brunski stole Peter's money from the vault, and she hired assassins to eliminate every supernatural creature in Beacon Hills. The hunters track down Satomi's pack and are fought off. During the fight, Scott further transforms into a new form, but regains control when the hunter he was fighting surrenders. Stiles and Malia discover a room filled with old computer servers behind the wall of the soundproof study at the lake house. They shut down the computers, deactivating the deadpool and terminating the Benefactor's contracts. Peter meets with Kate and continues with his plan to kill Scott and steal his powers.
59	11	"A Promise to the Dead"	Tim Andrew	Jeff Davis & Ian Stokes	September 1, 2014	1.29
Dr. Deaton meets with one of the inmates of Eichen House, Dr. Valack, who claims to have knowledge regarding what Kate did to Derek. Deaton obtains the information by looking into Valack's third eye, but ends up in a coma. Chris tracks down Kate in the sewers, but encounters Peter and a Berserker. Peter impales Chris with a metal bar and leaves. As Stiles and Liam prepare for the season's first lacrosse game, Scott and Kira go on a date in Derek's loft, but are ambushed by Kate. Scott and Kira are eventually defeated and abducted. Lydia is able to awaken Deaton; he informs the group that Kate has taken Scott and Kira to Mexico. Peter appears at the lacrosse game, and offers Malia a deal; he will give Malia her mother's identity if she helps him kill Kate. Parrish finds Chris in the sewers and frees Chris. Kate imprisons Scott and Kira in the abandoned church in the Mexican town where she was keeping Derek, and informs Scott that she is planning to turn him into a Berserker.
60	12	"Smoke and Mirrors"	Russell Mulcahy	Jeff Davis	September 8, 2014	1.54
Kira awakens in the tunnels, and Scott, now a Berserker, attacks her. Kate explains that she was drawn to La Iglesia after she turned into a Nagual, and found Berserkers. Lydia and Mason are attacked by a Berserker at the school, and are held prisoner. The pack arrive at La Iglesia, but are attacked by Scott. Derek is badly injured, and Braeden protects him while the rest pursue Scott. Stiles finds Kira, while Peter, Liam and Malia overpower Scott, and Liam manages to bring him back. In Beacon Hills, Stilinski enters the school and destroys the Berserker using the Mute's mine. In La Iglesia, Kate attacks Braeden, but Chris, Parrish and the Calaveras arrive. Derek apparently dies, but reveals that his body was evolving; he is a werewolf again, and can shift into a full wolf. Kate escapes into the tunnels and reveals to Chris that she tried to kill Scott because she blames him for the death of Allison and the decimation of the Argent family. Peter reveals his true plan to become the Alpha again and attacks Scott, who embraces his true nature, and easily defeats Peter. Chris leaves with the Calaveras to hunt down Kate. Peter is locked up in the supernatural wing at Eichen House, in the same room as Dr. Valack.

== Production ==
A fourth season of 12 episodes was confirmed and premiered on June 23, 2014, on MTV. Filming began in February 2014. Crystal Reed and Daniel Sharman did not return, making this the first season of the show not to star Reed and the first since season two not to star Sharman. Jill Wagner (Kate Argent) confirmed on Wolf Watch that she will be appearing more this season after her character made a surprise appearance in the season 3 finale.

New cast additions include Meagan Tandy as Braeden (who only appeared in 2 episodes of season 3), Dylan Sprayberry as "Liam", Khylin Rambo as Mason "an out-and-proud athlete" and Mason Dye as Garrett. In addition to this, Dylan O'Brien and Jeff Davis confirmed in interviews that Malia Tate (Shelley Hennig) and Kira Yukimura (Arden Cho) would be regulars this season and join the pack.

On July 14, 2014, during the original airing of the fourth episode of the season, there was an audio failure in one of the scenes. MTV posted the scene, with the proper audio, on its official Facebook account the following day.

== Reception ==
The review aggregator website Rotten Tomatoes reported an approval rating of 67% and an average rating of 4.98/10 for the fourth season, based on 12 reviews. The website's critics consensus reads, "Teen Wolf's fourth season refreshingly seeks to mix things up but feels less confident than its predecessors, giving viewers reason to fear that this series may already be long in the tooth."

== Awards and nominations ==
Year	Association	Category	Nominee(s)	Result
2014	Young Hollywood Award	Bingeworthy TV Show	Teen Wolf	Nominated

== Home media ==
Season 4 was released on DVD in the United States on June 9, 2015, 20 days before the premiere of Season 5 on June 29, 2015.
