= Cioffi =

Cioffi is an Italian surname. Notable people with the surname include:

- Anthony Cioffi (born 1994), American football player
- Antonio Cioffi (born 2002), Italian footballer
- Charles Cioffi (1935–2026), American actor
- Felippe Cioffi, American trombone soloist
- Frank Cioffi (1928–2012), American philosopher
- Gabriele Cioffi (born 1975), Italian footballer
- Halle Cioffi (born 1969), American tennis player
- John Cioffi (born 1956), American electrical engineer and inventor
- Lokanātha (Salvatore Cioffi; 1897–1966), Italian Buddhist missionary
- Lou Cioffi (born 1957), American soccer player
- Massimo Cioffi (born 1997), Italian rugby player
- Mauro Cioffi (born 1994), Italian footballer
- Sandy Cioffi, American filmmaker
- Rebecca Parr Cioffi, American writer
