= Teen Wolf season 5 =

Teen Wolf
- Season 5
- DVD cover for both parts
- Starring: Tyler Posey; Dylan O'Brien; Holland Roden; Shelley Hennig; Arden Cho; Dylan Sprayberry
- No. of episodes: 20

Release
- Original network: MTV
- Original release: June 29, 2015 – March 8, 2016

Season chronology
- ← Previous; Season 4 Next → Season 6

The fifth season of Teen Wolf, an American supernatural drama created by Jeff Davis and to some extent based on the 1985 film of the same name, received an order of 20 episodes on June 24, 2014, and premiered on June 29, 2015. The second episode aired the day after, on June 30, 2015, then returned to the regular schedule on Mondays.

The first ten episodes of the season premiered in June 2015, with the second half of the season premiering on January 5, 2016. The entire season concluded on March 8, 2016. However, unlike the third season, the twenty episodes featured the same story arc. Several cast changes occurred, with Dylan Sprayberry becoming a series regular as Liam Dunbar, while Tyler Hoechlin left the show to pursue film roles.

== Cast ==
=== Main ===
- Tyler Posey as Scott McCall
- Dylan O'Brien as Stiles Stilinski
- Holland Roden as Lydia Martin
- Shelley Hennig as Malia Tate
- Arden Cho as Kira Yukimura
- Dylan Sprayberry as Liam Dunbar

=== Recurring and guest ===
- Cody Christian as Theo Raeken
- Linden Ashby as Sheriff Stilinski
- Melissa Ponzio as Melissa McCall
- Seth Gilliam as Dr. Alan Deaton
- Meagan Tandy as Braeden
- Ryan Kelley as Deputy Jordan Parrish
- Khylin Rhambo as Mason Hewitt
- Susan Walters as Natalie Martin
- Tom Choi as Ken Yukimura
- Tamlyn Tomita as Noshiko Yukimura
- Steven Brand as Dr. Gabriel Valack
- J.R. Bourne as Chris Argent
- Max Carver as Aiden Steiner
- Marti Matulis as the Surgeon
- Douglas Tait as the Pathologist
- Caitlin Dechelle as the Geneticist
- Michael Lynch as the Slaugh
- Cody Saintgnue as Brett Talbot
- Kelsey Chow as Tracy Stewart
- Victoria Moroles as Hayden Romero
- Ashton Moio as Donovan Donati
- Michael Johnston as Corey Bryant
- Henry Zaga as Josh Diaz
- Gabriel Hogan as Belasko
- Michael Hogan as Gerard Argent
- Gideon Emery as Deucalion
- Marisol Nichols as Corinne, the Desert Wolf
- Orny Adams as Bobby Finstock
- Gilles Marini as Sebastien Valet
- Lachlan Buchanan as Henri Argent
- Crystal Reed as Marie-Jeanne Valet (special guest star)

== Episodes ==
No. overall	No. in season	Title	Directed by	Written by	Original release date	US viewers (millions)
Part 1
61	1	"Creatures of the Night"	Russell Mulcahy	Jeff Davis	June 29, 2015	1.53
Scott, Stiles, Lydia, Kira and Malia prepare for their senior year. Sheriff Stilinski is threatened by a teenage delinquent named Donovan. Kira comes back to Beacon Hills after spending the summer in New York. Stiles and Malia are continuing their search for Malia's biological mother, the Desert Wolf, while Stiles is struggling with the fear that he will lose his high school friends when they all go to college. A strange, mutated werewolf named Belasko hunts down Scott, intending to steal his Alpha power. Scott and Kira are able to fight off Belasko with the help of another Beta werewolf, who introduces himself as Theo, an old friend of Scott and Stiles. Theo says that he's come back to Beacon Hills to join Scott's pack. Belasko later reports to his masters, the Dread Doctors, and is executed by their leader, the Surgeon. In a flash-forward, Lydia is being held in Eichen House; she's questioned by Dr. Valack, and says that her friends are all going to die.
62	2	"Parasomnia"	Tim Andrew	Jeff Davis	June 30, 2015	1.18
Deaton informs Scott that Belasko's claws were actually the talons of a harpy eagle, and warns him that someone may be trying to change the rules of their supernatural world. Stiles investigates Theo, as he's convinced that Theo is up to no good. Liam reveals his true nature as a werewolf to his best friend Mason, and tells him about the supernatural world. Lydia and Parrish try to help a girl named Tracy, who has been suffering from hallucinations and night terrors. Tracy later wanders into the lair of the Doctors, who inject her with a serum that turns her into a werewolf.
63	3	"Dreamcatchers"	Russell Mulcahy	Talia Gonzalez & Bisanne Masoud	July 6, 2015	1.38
Tracy goes on a killing spree, brutally murdering her father and her psychiatrist. Liam, Mason and Brett discover that Tracy was buried alive in the woods and dug her way out of the ground. Lydia and Kira figure out that Tracy is still trapped in a night terror and thinks that she's still asleep. Scott, Stiles and Malia bring Tracy to Deaton at the vet clinic, where Tracy grows a tail and is revealed to be a Kanima. She paralyzes Scott, Stiles, Deaton and Malia and escapes, breaking through a barrier of mountain ash with ease. Tracy then goes after Lydia's mother at the police station; during the resulting fight, Kira unleashes her Kitsune powers and manages to cut off Tracy's tail, but Lydia is badly injured. Malia arrives and manages to subdue Tracy, but the Doctors immediately appear and kill Tracy in front of Malia.
64	4	"Condition Terminal"	Bronwen Hughes	Jeff Davis & Ian Stokes	July 13, 2015	1.01
In a flashback, Parrish tells Lydia about a dream where he carries a body to the Nemeton before setting himself on fire. The Doctors abduct Donovan and transform him into a supernatural creature, who Theo is working with. Lydia undergoes surgery in the hospital, and asks Parrish to teach her how to fight. Deaton informs Scott that Belasko was a werewolf-Garuda hybrid, while Tracy was a werewolf-Kanima hybrid. They were both made artificially, explaining why Tracy was immune to mountain ash: someone is creating hybrid supernatural creatures. While being Mason's wingman at a nightclub, Liam argues with a girl named Hayden, while another Chimera, Lucas, tries to seduce Mason. Scott, Kira, Liam, and Brett manage to subdue Lucas. Kira loses control and attempts to kill Lucas, but Scott stops her. The Doctors appear and kill Lucas themselves, stating that he was a failure. Malia discovers a book in Tracy's bedroom called "The Dread Doctors", featuring pictures of the Doctors on its cover. Parrish takes Lucas's body to the Nemeton in a trance and sets them both ablaze. Elsewhere, Stiles is attacked by Donovan, who has been fully transformed into a Chimera.
65	5	"A Novel Approach"	Tim Andrew	Angela L. Harvey	July 20, 2015	1.26
Donovan, who is revealed as a wendigo-lamprey hybrid, chases Stiles into the school library, where Stiles accidentally kills him in self-defense. Parrish steals the bodies of Tracy and Donovan, and takes them into the woods in another trance. Scott overhears Kira whispering in Japanese in her sleep. Malia shows the book that she found to the others, and Scott discovers that it is dedicated to Dr. Valack, a three-eyed inmate at Eichen House. Scott, Kira, Stiles, and Lydia go to Eichen House. Stiles and Lydia question Valack, who reveals that he wrote the book under an assumed name to chronicle what happened the last time the Doctors came to Beacon Hills. Kira's electric power goes haywire, knocking out the power to the asylum, and disrupting the electromagnetic currents that are part of its supernatural security system. The Doctors enter the asylum, attack Valack, and surgically remove his third eye. Malia has a flashback while driving with Theo, and discovers that the Desert Wolf caused the car crash that killed her adopted mother and sister. An injured Valack uses a recording of Lydia's banshee scream to shatter the glass wall of his cell.
66	6	"Required Reading"	Alice Troughton	Jeff Davis & Ian Stokes	July 27, 2015	1.14
Sheriff Stilinski discovers eight large holes on the lacrosse field, suggesting that the Dread Doctors have created eight new Chimeras. Parrish begins teaching Lydia how to fight. Liam attempts to make things up to Hayden. The group begins reading Valack's book, but Kira has difficulty reading it. Mason later explains to her that it is because Kitsunes are confused by "language tricks." Theo records Kira's whispering in her sleep, and he later informs Scott that what she has been saying translates to "I am the messenger of death." Scott has an asthma attack at the high school. One of the new Chimeras, a boy named Josh, enters the school basement, and chews through the power lines, before making his way to the hospital roof. Scott, Stiles and Lydia all experience traumatic visions because of their exposure to the book. Liam discovers that Hayden is a Chimera. In the hospital, Scott and Malia are attacked by the Pathologist, one of the Doctors, but they manage to escape. Meanwhile, Stiles goes to the roof of the hospital during a hallucination. Josh, the new Chimera, attacks Stiles, but Theo rescues him and kills Josh.
67	7	"Strange Frequencies"	Russell Mulcahy	Angela L. Harvey	August 3, 2015	1.09
Theo convinces Stiles to help him conceal the truth about Josh's death. Hayden is attacked by the Doctors, but Liam rescues her and takes her home. However, she then transforms into a werewolf. Mason befriends Corey, Lucas's ex-boyfriend, and discovers that Corey is also a Chimera. Kira's mother, Noshiko, warns her that Kira's "inner fox" is fighting her for control. Melissa McCall and Sheriff Stilinski discover that the Chimeras had all previously received organ transplants. Theo and Stiles stake out the vet clinic to find out who is stealing the dead Chimeras. Scott, Lydia, Malia, Liam, and Parrish set up a trap in the high school, planning to protect Hayden and capture one of the Doctors. Kira disappears from her house. Meanwhile, Parrish slips into another trance after seeing a hallucination of Lydia. He goes to the vet clinic, knocks Stiles and Theo unconscious, and steals Josh's body. The Doctors enter the high school, subdue Scott, Lydia and Malia using illusions, and abduct Liam and Hayden. Melissa finds a dead Chimera girl in her house, who has been impaled by Kira's katana.
68	8	"Ouroboros"	David Daniel	Will Wallace	August 10, 2015	1.10
Deaton investigates the Doctors, but is confronted by the Desert Wolf. Kira is arrested for the murder of the Chimera girl, but her father confesses to the crime to protect her. The Doctors begin experimenting on Liam and Hayden. Scott accesses Corey's memories and discovers that the Doctors took him to a water plant. Liam and Hayden meet another Chimera with amputated wings. Zach explains that the Doctors kill their failed Chimeras when they start bleeding mercury. Scott, Malia, and Mason go to the water plant to rescue Liam and Hayden but fail. Theo and Lydia discover that Liam and Hayden are being held in the abandoned house where Belasko first appeared. Kira manages to read Valack's book and discovers that the Doctors experimented on her the night she first came back to Beacon Hills. At the hospital, Parrish goes into another trance and steals the female Chimera's body. Kira decides to leave Beacon Hills with her family until she can understand what the Doctors did to her. Stiles and Lydia find out that Parrish is the person stealing the bodies.
69	9	"Lies of Omission"	Tim Andrew	Eric Wallace	August 17, 2015	1.10
Scott struggles with the return of his asthma. Theo asks the Doctors to leave Hayden alive. Hayden begins bleeding mercury, while Corey begins vomiting blood and mercury and is taken to the hospital. Theo tells Scott that Stiles murdered Donovan, leaving out that it was in self-defense. Corey tries to escape the hospital, but he is found and killed by the Surgeon. Lydia and Parrish find the Nemeton, where Parrish has left the dead Chimeras. Parrish is horrified, and tells Lydia that in his dream, there were hundreds of bodies. Theo lies to Sheriff Stilinski, claiming that he killed Donovan in self-defense. Liam and Hayden decide to go on the run, but they are confronted by the Doctors. Scott, Theo, and Liam fight them, while the third Doctor injects Hayden. Parrish locks himself in a cell at the police station. Scott confronts Stiles at the vet clinic, and they fight over Stiles killing Donovan. Hayden's condition begins rapidly worsening. Liam asks Scott to bite Hayden, hoping that it will heal her, but Scott refuses to do so.
70	10	"Status Asthmaticus"	Russell Mulcahy	Jeff Davis & Ian Stokes	August 24, 2015	0.96
Scott argues that Hayden is weak and will die if he bites her. The pack enlist Melissa to treat Hayden at the vet clinic, while Lydia discovers that Parrish is a hellhound. Theo locks Malia up at the hospital, and then abducts and injures Sheriff Stilinski. Scott goes to the school, where Theo traps him with mountain ash and reveals that he was the first Chimera, and Scott finds that Theo was poisoning him by putting wolfsbane in his inhaler. Malia escapes, but is attacked by a Chimera. However, Braeden rescues her and warns her of the Desert Wolf. Theo confronts Stiles and reveals his plan to create a pack of villains. Scott and Liam engage in a fight, and Scott's poisoning and his unwillingness to kill Liam render him disadvantaged, but Mason appears and returns Liam to a calm state. Theo kills Scott, however, Melissa is able to revive him. Theo accesses Lydia's memories, and brings her to the Nemeton where he injects Tracy, Corey, Josh, and Hayden to revive them as his own pack. The Doctors uncover a painting depicting a battle between a hellhound and another creature.
Part 2
71	11	"The Last Chimera"	Russell Mulcahy	Jeff Davis	January 5, 2016	1.11
Parrish experiences a vision, which prompts him to search for Lydia; he discovers her in the woods in a catatonic state. Stiles confronts Scott, demanding to know what happened to his father. After a brief discussion, Stiles meets with Theo. Stiles and Scott deduce that Stiles' father was attacked by another Chimera, Noah Patrick, who is also being hunted by the Dread Doctors. Lydia's mom signs papers to transfer Lydia to Eichen House. The pack find Noah and are confronted by the Dread Doctors, but Chris Argent helps them escape. Stiles discovers that his dad was poisoned by Noah's bone spikes. This information is relayed to Melissa, who informs the surgeon to remove a piece of Noah's bone spike from Sheriff Stilinski's body, and saves his life. In a flashforward, Lydia experiences a vision where she sees Theo's sister without her heart, and discovers that in the past, the Dread Doctors transplanted the heart to Theo to make him the first Chimera. Theo kidnaps Lydia, but Parrish shows up in his Hellhound form.
72	12	"Damnatio Memoriae"	Tim Andrew	Brian Sieve	January 12, 2016	0.93
Hayden and Liam are attacked by a massive, shadowy creature, which Scott later identifies as the Doctors' last Chimera. Scott and Stiles reconcile and begin investigating the creature, while Theo trains his new Chimera pack. Malia and Braeden discover that the Desert Wolf is on her way to Beacon Hills with Deaton hostage. Lydia has a dream of Meredith, who promises to teach her how to control her banshee powers. Scott and Stiles deduce that the monster is an ancient supernatural creature that was recreated by the Dread Doctors, and decide that they need to reunite their pack. Chris visits Gerard, heals him using a strange plant, and interrogates him about the last Chimera. Gerard reveals that the creature is the Beast of Gévaudan. Kira and her mother are in New Mexico, where they are confronted by a trio of Skinwalkers.
73	13	"Codominance"	Jennifer Lynch	Will Wallace	January 19, 2016	0.91
Theo and Tracy are confronted by the Doctors and the Beast, after Theo reveals that the Doctors are trying to help the Beast remember its past self and unleash its full power. Meanwhile, the Skinwalkers inform Kira and Noshiko that they intend to test Kira to see if she can learn control; if not, they will turn her into a Skinwalker. Scott and Stiles go in search of Kira, and reconcile along the way; in the process, Scott deduces that Malia intends to kill her mother, the Desert Wolf. At Eichen House, Meredith continues teaching Lydia how to use her banshee powers. Kira's test begins, as the Skinwalkers summon an Oni for her to fight; however, Kira's inner fox takes control of her and destroys the Oni, thereby failing the test. The Skinwalkers attempt to force Kira to stay, but Scott and Stiles arrive in time to rescue her and Noshiko. Kira and Scott reunite as they return home. Liam and Mason tell Scott that they've learned Theo is trying to find a blind Alpha, and Scott realizes that Theo is looking for Deucalion.
74	14	"The Sword and the Spirit"	Kate Eastridge	Angela L. Harvey	January 26, 2016	0.92
Chris and Gerard find corpses in the sewers, victims of the Beast. Scott and Liam discover the Doctors' underground lair, where they meet up with Chris and Gerard and discover a painting in the Doctor's lair that depicts a battle between the Beast and a Hellhound. Gerard and Chris help Parrish to discover his true nature. Malia, Braeden and Theo track down the Desert Wolf and find Deaton, but Theo hands Malia over to the Desert Wolf in exchange for Belasko's claws. The Desert Wolf reveals that she wants to kill Malia because she lost some of her power when she gave birth to Malia, and intends to reabsorb that power. The Beast appears and attacks; Malia, Braeden and Deaton escape, and the Desert Wolf gets away. Lydia gains control over her powers and tries to escape Eichen House, but fails. Theo and his pack have captured Deucalion, now blind again; he deduces that Theo wants his help in stealing the Beast's powers, and demands Scott's eyes in exchange. Scott reunites his pack and begins planning to rescue Lydia.
75	15	"Amplification"	Russell Mulcahy	Lindsay Jewett Sturman	February 2, 2016	0.98
The Beast goes on a rampage through Beacon Hills; Parrish tries to stop it as a Hellhound, but is defeated. Deaton warns Scott and Stiles that, if Dr. Valack has drilled a hole into Lydia's skull to amplify her powers, it will kill her, as well as triggering a supercharged "death scream" that will kill everyone around her. Scott and his pack develop a plan to get Lydia out of Eichen House. Scott, Stiles and Liam infiltrate Eichen House, while Malia and Kira enter the electrical room and are able to knock out the power. Deucalion informs Hayden that Theo intends to use Belasko's claws to absorb the Beast's power, but the claws will kill him if Theo uses them. Scott and Liam are able to get Stiles into the closed wing, where supernatural creatures cannot enter due to mountain ash. Stiles reaches Lydia, to find that Valack has already performed the operation, and hides when Valack arrives. Theo and his pack break into the asylum, and use Lydia to lure the Hellhound to them. Eichen House goes on lockdown, trapping everyone inside.
76	16	"Lie Ability"	Russell Mulcahy	Eric Wallace	February 9, 2016	0.88
Parrish easily overpowers Tracy, Josh and Corey, but Theo disables him by impaling him; meanwhile, Valack escapes with Lydia, and Stiles and Theo pursues them. Scott and Liam find Meredith, who tells Scott that Parrish can find Lydia. Kira's electricity begins to overload, but Josh helps her by absorbing the electricity; in exchange, Malia helps to heal Corey, who was badly burned by Parrish. Valack plans to increase Lydia's power so that she can discover the identity of the Beast, and reveals that he intends to put a Dread Doctor helmet on her; however, Lydia loses control and unleashes a scream that kills Valack. Scott and Liam help Parrish transform back into his Hellhound form. Stiles and Theo rescue Lydia, while Parrish burns through the mountain ash barrier, allowing Scott and Liam to follow him. Lydia begins to unleash a deadly scream, but Parrish smothers the scream and saves the others. Mason and Hayden restore power to Eichen House, and the packs escape. Scott and Stiles rush Lydia to Deaton, who heals her.
77	17	"A Credible Threat"	Tim Andrew	Jeff Davis	February 16, 2016	0.97
Parrish fights the Beast at the school, but loses, as the Beast is getting smarter. Mason deduces that the Doctors are using high-frequency radio signals to trigger the Beast's shifts, and the pack realize that the Beast may be summoned again at the upcoming lacrosse game. Scott and Stiles find Bobby Finstock in rehab, and convince him to coach the game, planning on having him forfeit the game; however, Finstock refuses to do so and the game begins. Scott convinces Brett and his sister Lori to help them. With help from Chris, Gerard and Lydia, Parrish is able to access his Hellhound side; the Hellhound informs Lydia that it possessed Parrish when he died defusing a bomb. At the game, Kira loses control and injures several players, before storming off. She almost kills Lori, but Scott stops her. Mason and Corey search for the Beast's human form at the game. Meanwhile, Malia disables the broadcast antennas, but she is interrupted by the Desert Wolf, and the news broadcast begins. The Beast immediately appears, and overpowers Liam before going on a rampage through the high school.
78	18	"Maid of Gévaudan"	Joseph P. Genier	Jeff Davis	February 23, 2016	0.76
Parrish leaves, believing himself to be dangerous. Chris and Gerard tell Lydia the story of Marie-Jeanne Valet, the first werewolf hunter and the woman who killed the Beast of Gévaudan. With help from her allies, including a man named Henri Argent, she hunted down and killed the Beast, which was revealed to be her brother Sebastien. Marie-Jeanne later married Henri and took his surname; they went on to start the Argent hunters. Gerard suggests that Lydia might be able to kill the Beast, but she insists that they need Parrish and leaves to find him. Meanwhile, Scott takes on the Beast at the school, while Stiles and Hayden heal Liam. Scott fights the Beast in the school library, after transforming in front of numerous students, and is losing until Stiles, Liam, Malia and Braeden help him. The four of them manage to drive the Beast out of the school, and Scott follows its scent to a car where they find a pair of bloody sneakers. Mason shows up and reveals that it's his car, and Scott and Liam realize that Mason is the Beast's human form. Before any of them can do anything, Corey appears and abducts Mason.
79	19	"The Beast of Beacon Hills"	Tim Andrew	Eric Wallace	March 1, 2016	0.91
Mason is abducted by the Dread Doctors. Lydia and Sheriff Stilinski persuade Parrish to remain in Beacon Hills and to fight the Beast. Deucalion reveals that he could have escaped from Theo at any time, and advises Theo on what to do next. Theo kills Josh and absorbs his power, allowing him to wear the Dread Doctor helmet to discern the Beast's identity; however, he doesn't see Mason. Scott, Liam and Theo team up and find Mason at the Doctors' lair, but they are cornered by the Doctors. Malia and Braeden are confronted by the Desert Wolf at Scott's house; the Desert Wolf gets past the mountain ash barrier, but Braeden recreates the barrier and traps the Desert Wolf inside the house with Malia. Kira returns to the desert and requests the Skinwalkers' help. The Doctors easily overpower Scott, Liam and Theo, but Mason then naturally transforms into the Beast. The Beast kills two of the Doctors, before Parrish, Chris and Gerard arrive and join the fight. The Beast reverts to human form, but transforms into Sebastien instead of Mason.
80	20	"Apotheosis"	Russell Mulcahy	Jeff Davis	March 8, 2016	0.80
Sebastien searches for the Surgeon's cane-sword, which Gerard reveals was once the spear that Marie-Jeanne used to kill the first Beast. The Surgeon was actually Marcel, Sebastien's old friend; he then dies. Theo kills Tracy and takes her power. Sebastien pays a visit to the Sheriff's station and injures Lydia and Hayden. Deaton thinks a part of Mason is still inside Sebastien, and that Lydia is the answer to saving him. Deucalion double-crosses Theo and reveals that he was working with Scott. Malia uses Belasko's talons to take away what's left of the Desert Wolf's power. Parrish, Chris, Scott and Liam fight Sebastien, but are losing, until Kira returns and brings Lydia to the Beast; Lydia screams Mason's name, separating Mason from the Beast. Parrish pins the Beast down and Scott impales it with the cane-sword. Theo attacks the pack, but Kira opens up the ground and summons Theo's dead sister, who drags him into the hole. Later on, Scott turns Hayden into a werewolf, Stiles decides to become a cop, and Kira leaves with the Skinwalkers to gain control over her fox spirit. The Doctors' final test subject, a Nazi Alpha werewolf, has escaped from their lab.

== Production ==
The series was renewed for a fifth season for a two-part 20-episode run on June 24, 2014. However, unlike the third season, it remained as a single 20-episode arc. Filming began on February 9, 2015. Season 5 premiered on June 29, 2015. Filming for the second part of Season 5 began on August 24, 2015. The second half of Season 5 premiered on January 5, 2016, and concluded on March 8, 2016.

On September 11, 2014, Holland Roden revealed that "you're going to have to tune in for season five to see if we're all coming back or not. That's just reality... It's sort of a toss up of who is not coming back for season five, but somebody is not coming back." Tyler Hoechlin was the major cast member who left the series. Dylan Sprayberry disclosed to Hollywood Life that "Liam will get a love interest next season". He also said Season 5 will see more of the friendship of Liam and Mason.

Of the season, Tyler Posey said "It's going to be badass. Like, it's another thing we haven't done before. I'm really excited. It's cool because I know nothing about the season, I only know one part of it. But it's so badass that I would watch the entire season just for this one part." Jeff Davis teased that there will be more complex mythology. Furthermore, Posey joined the production team as a co-producer.

On December 27, 2014, Davis posted a picture on Instagram of the front page of the season's first episode's script, written by himself and titled "Creatures of the Night".

In January 2015, Teen Wolf launched a competition where fans could enter their original creature designs on Tumblr using the tag #TWCreatureFeature with the winner getting their creature brought to life in Season 5. The contest ended February 4, 2015 and the winner was announced March 9, 2015. The winning design will be introduced in the first few episodes of Season 5, with the name Slaugh, the creature can reportedly "eat the souls of the innocent. He can also leave a portion of his soul inside the bodies of his victims". On May 9, 2015, it was announced that Slaugh will be portrayed by Michael Lynch.

Steven Brand was added to the cast as a new villain, Dr. Valack. On February 10, 2015, Cody Christian was cast as Theo, "a lone wolf who is drawn to town in search of a pack. He's described as athletic and charming yet covert, and while it may appear that the young adult is new to town, his past might suggest otherwise". On March 7, 2015, Orny Adams revealed at a Teen Wolf convention that he would not be returning for the fifth season due to scheduling conflicts. On March 11, 2015, it was announced that Tyler Hoechlin would not be returning at all. On May 12, 2015, Michael Johnston was cast in as Corey, reported to appear as Mason's lover. On March 12, 2015, Sprayberry revealed that his character's love interest would be played by Victoria Moroles. On November 11, 2015, Davis confirmed that Adams would return in the second part of Season 5. On January 7, 2016, it was announced that Crystal Reed would be returning to the show for a guest appearance playing a different character.

== Reception ==
The review aggregator website Rotten Tomatoes reported an approval rating of 92% and an average rating of 6.01/10 for the fifth season, based on 12 reviews. The website's critics consensus reads, "Teen Wolf rebounds from a case of the narrative shakes by doubling down on the absurdity in a season that goes for broke with narrative irreverence and campy thrills."

== Awards and nominations ==
Year	Award	Category	Nominee(s)	Result
2015	Saturn Awards	Best Performance by a Younger Actor in a Television Series	Tyler Posey	Nominated
2015	Saturn Awards	Best Youth-Oriented Television Series	Teen Wolf	Nominated
2015	Teen Choice Awards	Choice TV: Scene Stealer	Dylan O'Brien	Won
2015	Teen Choice Awards	Choice TV: Summer Show	Teen Wolf	Won
2015	Teen Choice Awards	Choice TV: Villain	The Dread Doctors	Nominated
2015	Teen Choice Awards	Choice TV Summer Star: Male	Tyler Posey	Nominated
2016	People's Choice Awards	Favorite Cable TV Sci-Fi/Fantasy Show	Teen Wolf	Nominated
