= Sean Porter (cinematographer) =

American cinematographer

- Born: Tacoma, Washington, U.S.
- Education: University of Washington
- Occupation: Cinematographer
- Years active: 2005–present

Sean Porter Campbell is an American cinematographer.

In 2014, he was listed on Filmmaker's "25 New Faces of Independent Film", as well as IndieWire's "Cinematographers to Watch" and Complex's "Underrated Cinematographers Poised to Make It Big in 2015". In 2015, he was listed on Variety's "10 Cinematographers to Watch". In 2024, he became a member of the American Society of Cinematographers.

== Early life ==
Growing up in Gig Harbor, Washington, he graduated from the University of Washington in 2004.

== Filmography ==
=== Film ===
| Year | Title | Director | Notes |
|---|---|---|---|
| 2009 | Sweet Crude | Sandy Cioffi | Documentary |
| 2010 | Bass Ackwards | Linas Phillips | |
| 2012 | Eden | Megan Griffiths | |
| 2012 | Grassroots | Stephen Gyllenhaal | |
| 2013 | It Felt Like Love | Eliza Hittman | |
| 2014 | Kumiko, the Treasure Hunter | David Zellner | |
| 2015 | Green Room | Jeremy Saulnier | |
| 2016 | The Trust | Alex Brewer; Benjamin Brewer | |
| 2016 | 20th Century Women | Mike Mills | |
| 2017 | Rough Night | Lucia Aniello | |
| 2018 | Green Book | Peter Farrelly | |
| 2022 | The Greatest Beer Run Ever | Peter Farrelly | |
| 2026 | I Play Rocky | Peter Farrelly | |
| 2028 | Lilo & Stitch 2 | Chris Sanders | |

=== Television ===
| Year | Title | Director | Notes |
|---|---|---|---|
| 2014 | Independent Lens | Reuben Atlas | Episode: "Brothers Hypnotic" |
| 2021 | Generation | Daniel Barnz | Episode: "Pilot" |
| 2022 | The Old Man | Jon Watts; Jet Wilkinson | 4 episodes |
| 2024–2025 | Star Wars: Skeleton Crew | Jon Watts; David Lowery; Lee Isaac Chung | 4 episodes |

== Awards and nominations ==
| Year | Award | Category | Title | Result |
|---|---|---|---|---|
| 2013 | Independent Spirit Awards | Best Cinematography | It Felt Like Love | Nominated |
| 2014 | Tallgrass Film Festival | Outstanding Cinematography | Kumiko, the Treasure Hunter | Won |
| 2018 | St. Louis Film Critics Association | Best Cinematography | Green Book | Nominated |
| 2023 | American Society of Cinematographers | Outstanding Cinematography in Television | The Old Man (For episode "I") | Won |
| 2023 | Primetime Emmy Awards | Outstanding Cinematography for a Series | The Old Man (For episode "I") | Nominated |
