= Teen Wolf season 6 =

Teen Wolf
- Season 6
- DVD cover for both parts
- Starring: Tyler Posey; Dylan O'Brien; Holland Roden; Shelley Hennig; Dylan Sprayberry; Linden Ashby; Melissa Ponzio; JR Bourne
- No. of episodes: 20

Release
- Original network: MTV
- Original release: November 15, 2016 – September 24, 2017

Season chronology
- ← Previous; Season 5

The sixth and final season of Teen Wolf, an American supernatural drama created by Jeff Davis and to some extent based on the 1985 film of the same name, received an order of 20 episodes on July 9, 2015, and premiered on November 15, 2016. The second half of the season premiered on July 30, 2017.

Unlike the previous season, instead of telling a single story, the season was split into two 10-episode arcs, following the same format of the third season. On July 21, 2016, the cast announced at Comic Con that the series would end after its sixth season. The final episode aired on September 24, 2017.

== Premise ==
Scott, Stiles, Lydia, Malia and the rest of the pack return to Beacon Hills High for the second semester of senior year. Everyone will be feeling a bit emotional and anxious as they inch closer to graduation and the thought of imminently parting ways almost becomes a reality. But their last semester in high school will not go without trouble. Teen Wolf executive producer Jeff Davis revealed that the sixth season will be a "ghost story".

== Cast ==
=== Main ===
- Tyler Posey as Scott McCall
- Dylan O'Brien as Stiles Stilinski
- Holland Roden as Lydia Martin
- Shelley Hennig as Malia Tate
- Dylan Sprayberry as Liam Dunbar
- Linden Ashby as Sheriff Noah Stilinski
- Melissa Ponzio as Melissa McCall
- JR Bourne as Chris Argent

=== Recurring and guest ===
- Seth Gilliam as Dr. Alan Deaton
- Orny Adams as Coach Bobby Finstock
- Ian Bohen as Peter Hale
- Ryan Kelley as Jordan Parrish
- Khylin Rhambo as Mason Hewitt
- Susan Walters as Natalie Martin
- Cody Christian as Theo Raeken
- Victoria Moroles as Hayden Romero
- Michael Johnston as Corey Bryant
- Ross Butler as Nathan Pierce
- Alisha Boe as Gwen
- Andrew Matarazzo as Gabe
- Gabrielle Elyse as Jayden
- Pete Ploszek as Garrett Douglas
- Joey Honsa as Claudia Stilinski
- Matthew Del Negro as Agent Rafael McCall
- Cody Saintgnue as Brett Talbot
- Tamlyn Tomita as Noshiko Yukimura
- Claire Bryétt Andrew as Sydney
- Lily Bleu Andrew as Lorilee Rohr
- Sibongile Mlambo as Tamora Monroe
- Michael Hogan as Gerard Argent
- Gideon Emery as Deucalion
- Froy Gutierrez as Nolan Holloway
- Colton Haynes as Jackson Whittemore
- Tyler Hoechlin as Derek Hale
- Charlie Carver as Ethan Steiner
- Jill Wagner as Kate Argent
- Haley Webb as Jennifer Blake

== Episodes ==
No. overall	No. in season	Title	Directed by	Written by	Original release date	US viewers (millions)
Part 1
81	1	"Memory Lost"	Tim Andrew	Lindsay Jewett Sturman	November 15, 2016	0.57
Liam and Hayden find a young boy named Alex whose parents were abducted by a man riding a horse. The gang goes to Alex's house and find that his parents appear to have been erased from existence. Stiles sees the man who took Alex's parents. Lydia and Stiles deduce that the men on horseback are Ghost Riders, part of the mythical Wild Hunt. Anyone who sees them is a future target for erasure. Alex is taken by the Riders and erased. Liam, Mason and Hayden find a dead body in the high school. Stiles realizes he is the next target of the Wild Hunt, as everyone except Lydia has forgotten him. Before he is taken by the Riders, he tells Lydia to find a way to remember him. The next day, it is apparent that Lydia has also forgotten Stiles.
82	2	"Superposition"	JD Taylor	Mark H. Kruger	November 22, 2016	0.41
Mason and Corey see the Ghost Riders abducting a student in the school, and Corey discovers that he can see the Riders when he turns invisible; however, they forget the abducted student when he is erased. Scott, Lydia and Malia all begin having hallucinations and subconscious memories linked to Stiles, and realize he must have been someone important to them. Stiles's mother, Claudia, is revealed to be alive as a result of Stiles's being erased. Liam, Mason and Corey use Corey's powers to recover the missing student's ID, which help them remember him. The gang deduces that the Wild Hunt does not just take people, but also erases them from reality. With Deaton's help, Lydia subconsciously draws Stiles's name, but does not remember who he is.
83	3	"Sundowning"	David Daniel	Will Wallace	November 29, 2016	0.43
Mr. Douglas, a new teacher at the high school, is revealed to be the Nazi Alpha werewolf who escaped from the Dread Doctors. He kills several people by eating their pineal glands, causing Argent to recruit Melissa to find the werewolf responsible for the murders. Hayden meets a student named Gwen, whose sister was abducted by the Ghost Riders. Assuming Gwen might be the Riders' next target, the gang throws a party in an attempt to keep her safe. The Riders arrive and Parrish confronts one, which vanishes without attacking him. The gang tracks down Sheriff Stilinski's father Elias, who turns out to have dementia and was abusive to his son, but remembers Stiles. Scott and Liam realize that all the students who saw the Ghost Rider at the party are now targets.
84	4	"Relics"	Tim Andrew	Eric Wallace	December 6, 2016	0.51
Lydia starts looking for some sort of "relic" Stiles might have left behind. The gang attempts to protect everyone who saw the Ghost Rider at the party by taking them to Argent's underground bunker. Mason deduces that Parrish may be able to stop the Riders, as they had left when he confronted them. The Riders however manage to erase everyone from the party, including Gwen, and also injure Argent and Malia. Parrish is shot by a Rider, but survives. Lydia and Melissa investigate Claudia's medical records, which show that she had no children, but miraculously survived her frontotemporal dementia. It is revealed that Stiles's "relic" is his Jeep, which is still in the school parking lot.
85	5	"Radio Silence"	Russell Mulcahy	Ross Maxwell	December 13, 2016	0.55
After being abducted, Stiles finds himself in an abandoned train station with others who were also erased by the Riders. One of those people is Peter Hale, who was abducted after he escaped Eichen House during the power outage caused when the pack rescued Lydia. The two attempt to figure out how to escape. Scott, Lydia, and Malia find the Jeep, realizing it might belong to Stiles. Peter makes it through the magic barrier, but is badly burned as a result, surviving only due to his healing ability. Scott and Malia find Peter, remember him, and realize they had forgotten him too. Stiles uses the train station intercom and is able to contact Scott and Lydia through the radio in his Jeep. He tells them to find "Canaan", one of the towns listed on the train station's Arrivals board.
86	6	"Ghosted"	Russell Mulcahy	Angela L. Harvey	January 3, 2017	0.45
Lydia has a vision of a town called Canaan in the 1980s, where the residents all disappeared. The gang goes to Canaan and realize that it is a ghost town, as the Riders have taken the entire population. They see a boy who leads them to the house of Lenore, a banshee who is the only remaining resident of Canaan. Lenore takes them prisoner as playmates for the boy, who is the ghost of her dead son Caleb, unconsciously summoned by her to fill the void in her life that was created by the loss of the townspeople. Caleb almost kills Scott and Malia until Lydia is able to convince Lenore to release them. Liam and Hayden devise a plan to fight the Riders. Using Kira's sword, Liam frees Theo from his purgatory.
87	7	"Heartless"	Kate Eastridge	Antoinette Stella	January 10, 2017	0.43
Lydia theorizes that Claudia is a ghost like Caleb, conjured by Sheriff Stilinski to fill the void in his life created by Stiles's erasure. The pack captures a Ghost Rider and tries to interrogate it, but are unsuccessful. Mason deduces that Parrish can communicate with the Riders, but the Rider somehow triggers Parrish, who tries to free it. Scott and Liam must force him away. Malia and Melissa heal Peter's burns in return for his help finding the location of the portal to the Riders' train station. Mr. Douglas reveals his true identity and overpowers Theo, then kills the Ghost Rider and eats its pineal gland. Lydia and Sheriff Stilinski find Stiles's old bedroom behind a wall in the Stilinski house. Mr. Douglas attacks Corey with the Ghost Rider's whip and causes him to vanish like the Riders' other victims.
88	8	"Blitzkrieg"	Joseph P. Genier	Will Wallace	January 17, 2017	0.44
Mr. Douglas forces Argent and Melissa to help him find Parrish; he then erases them both and takes control of Parrish. Theo explains that Douglas was a Nazi captain, and that he wants to take control of the Ghost Riders and use them as his own supernatural army. The gang realizes that the rift's entrance is underground. The Riders erase Mason and Hayden, but Liam escapes. Mr. Douglas and a mind-controlled Parrish confront the gang at the rift; Parrish opens the rift, and Douglas and Parrish go through it. The Riders nearly kill Scott and Malia, until Peter intervenes and sacrifices himself to help them escape, being erased again. Sheriff Stilinski recovers his memories of Stiles and realizes that Claudia is dead, which causes her spirit to vanish. Scott, Lydia, Malia, Liam, Theo and Sheriff Stilinski are now the only people left in Beacon Hills; however, they realize they can open another rift by remembering Stiles.
89	9	"Memory Found"	Tim Andrew	Mark H. Kruger & Antoinette Stella	January 24, 2017	0.49
Lydia, Malia and Scott try to remember Stiles in hopes of reopening the rift. Sheriff Stilinski is erased by the Ghost Riders. Scott and Malia each enter Parrish's freeze chamber and go into a death-like trance in the hope that it will trigger memories of Stiles, which will open a rift. They each recover their memories of Stiles, but the rift does not open. Scott then hypnotizes Lydia, which brings her to the memory of when she first kissed Stiles. This finally opens the rift. Liam and Theo fight the Ghost Riders to keep them from finding Scott.
90	10	"Riders on the Storm"	Russell Mulcahy	Lindsay Jewett Sturman & Joseph P. Genier	January 31, 2017	0.45
Stiles makes it through the rift and reappears in his Jeep. Stiles helps free Parrish from Douglas's control. Liam finds the train station and reunites with Mason and Hayden; they discover Douglas is using Corey to merge the Ghost Riders' realm with the real world, so he can gain control over them. Stiles and Lydia kiss before Claudia's spirit attacks them, but they destroy her. The pack battles Douglas and the Riders, and divert the Riders' ghostly train from Beacon Hills to free Corey, and reverses the merging. The Riders leave and claim Douglas as one of their own. Beacon Hills returns to normal with the pack completing their last day of high school.
Part 2
91	11	"Said the Spider to the Fly"	Russell Mulcahy	Adam Karp	July 30, 2017	0.52
Scott and Liam discover many dead wolves in the forest. A new hellhound named Hawlyn escapes from Eichen House, seeking something that Scott's pack let out when they rescued everybody from the Wild Hunt. Lydia has a premonition and convinces Malia, who was on her way to Paris, and Scott, who was preparing to leave for college, to stay in Beacon Hills to help. Tamora Monroe, the new guidance counselor with ulterior motives, kills Hawlyn before the pack can learn about the creature he was hunting. Scott deduces that Hawlyn's killer was a hunter. Stiles begins his career as an FBI intern in Virginia and is shocked to discover the FBI are pursuing Derek Hale, who they believe is a mass murderer.
92	12	"Raw Talent"	Tim Andrew	Brian Millikin	August 6, 2017	0.47
Theo is attacked by a group of unknown hunters. Feeling threatened, Scott loses control of his shift and almost attacks Sheriff Stilinski. A student named Aaron is attacked by a swarm of spiders in the locker room, and Liam and Mason find a faceless body in the same room. Scott and Malia save Argent's life when his latest buyers in his gun business attempt to kill him. Argent deduces that the hellhound's killer is a new hunter. Monroe attacks Brett after figuring out he is a werewolf. Brett flees after Gerard wounds him with an arrow. Gerard recruits Monroe due to her potential as a hunter. Parrish and Lydia go to Eichen House; Parrish is nearly killed by the head doctor, Conrad Fenris, who displays the same fear of the supernatural as Monroe, but Lydia rescues him. The pack deduces that something is making the ordinary people of Beacon Hills afraid of the supernatural.
93	13	"After Images"	Tyler Posey	Angela L. Harvey	August 13, 2017	0.43
Scott, Malia, Liam and Brett's sister Lori try to find Brett, who has been poisoned and is being hunted by Gerard and Monroe. The pack tracks them into the tunnels, where Scott is injured when a hunter's tripwire is triggered. While Malia is trying to take Scott's pain away so he can heal faster, Scott, driven to delirium by the pain, reveals that he has developed romantic feelings for Malia, which both surprises and pleases her. Liam and Lori find Brett and escape the sewers. It is revealed that Gerard had set a trap; Brett and Lori are hit and killed by a truck as soon as they escape, and Liam's rage causes him to shift in front of many eyewitnesses. At the high school, Nolan stabs Corey with a pen and sees his injury heal, outing Corey as a supernatural creature. At the hospital, Melissa attempts to perform an autopsy on the faceless corpse, but is overwhelmed by terror emanating from the corpse. She enlists Argent to help her; they remove a tissue sample from it, but they discover that the corpse has no DNA.
94	14	"Face-to-Faceless"	Linden Ashby	Will Wallace	August 20, 2017	0.44
Aaron goes to the hospital and regurgitates the swarm of spiders onto the faceless corpse, which comes back to life. Rumors about Liam's true nature spread through school. Nolan and the lacrosse team beat him up terribly to try to make him transform through anger, but he is able to resist the change until Coach Finstock intervenes. Malia, who is revealed to reciprocate Scott's feelings for her, tries to tell him of her own feelings, but is unable to spark up the courage, frustrating her. Liam learns Monroe is the new hunter, and Scott meets with her and Gerard for a peace treaty. Monroe reveals she was almost killed by the Beast of Gévaudan, for which she blames Scott's pack. The faceless corpse (the creature that escaped the Wild Hunt) attacks Scott's pack and the hunters, but Parrish repels it. A young werewolf named Quinn is shot by a deputy and later seeks sanctuary with Scott.
95	15	"Pressure Test"	Tim Andrew	Jennifer Quintenz	August 20, 2017	0.37
Deaton, Mason and Corey identify the Wild Hunt escapee as the Anuk-Ite or Double-Face, a powerful creature from Native American mythology, which feeds on the fear it creates. Theo escapes the hunters along with Jiang and Tierney, the last survivors of Satomi's pack, but the trio are arrested for murder. Scott's pack go to the police station but Monroe's hunters surround the precinct, demanding they hand over Jiang and Tierney, who killed some of her hunters to avenge Satomi. The Anuk-Ite increases everyone's fear, and two deputies kill themselves. Scott's father arrives and makes a compromise with the hunters, taking Jiang and Tierney into FBI custody, but the deputy who drives them away is loyal to Monroe and kills them. Scott's father persuades Scott's pack to flee Beacon Hills, but they only pretend to do so, having decided to fight back.
96	16	"Triggers"	Eric Wallace	Eric Wallace	September 3, 2017	0.44
Aaron identifies a werecoyote named Edgar in school and "tests" him by transferring a spider into his body. Edgar is left slowly dying, and Monroe has him killed by Gabe, unsettling Nolan. Theo and Liam draw the hunters to an abandoned zoo, and Theo stops Liam from killing Nolan in rage, warning him that his fear of the Anuk-Ite triggers his anger. The pack breaks into Gerard's armory, discovering it empty of weapons. They find Jiang and Tierney's remains and a world map, and inadvertently activate the armory's security system, which sucks all the oxygen out of the room. Scott and Malia nearly suffocate to death, but Lydia and Argent rescue them. At the McCall home, Scott and Malia reveal their feelings for each other and kiss passionately, starting a relationship. They discover that Gerard's map indicates the locations of all the Nemetons around the world, which he plans to use to wipe out all supernaturals, and that Gerard has given all his weapons to the people of Beacon Hills. The house is suddenly attacked by gunfire, and one of them is shot.
97	17	"Werewolves of London"	Russell Mulcahy	Kyle Steinbach	September 10, 2017	0.42
Gerard sends hunters to London, where Jackson and Ethan, now a couple, live. Suspecting Gerard, they return to Beacon Hills to find Scott, but are captured by Monroe. Melissa, Mason, Rafael and Lydia were all shot in the gunfire attack, moving Scott to decide to form an army to combat Gerard's army. He and Malia unsuccessfully try to recruit Deucalion to join the fight. Malia recruits her father Peter Hale, who joins after he sees that Malia is in love with Scott. Scott and Malia also try to recruit another pack of werewolves known as the "Primal", but find them all dead, killed by the Anuk-Ite, with a second skinless corpse amongst them, meaning the Anuk-Ite's second half has taken the form of a werewolf. The pack discovers that Aaron is the first half of the Anuk-Ite. Lydia sees a vision of the dead Hellhound Hawlyn, who reveals that she needs to find the other half of the Anuk-Ite before it finds itself.
98	18	"Genotype"	Joseph P. Genier	Joseph P. Genier	September 17, 2017	0.43
Lydia and Malia briefly revive Halwyn, who warns them of the Anuk-Ite's petrifying vision before the silver from Monroe's bullet poisons and finally kills him. While Mason and Theo track Aaron in the tunnels beneath the town, Scott and Liam trace a call on a dead Primal werewolf's phone to science teacher Mrs. Finch, who is revealed to be the Alpha of the Primal pack and Quinn's mother. Quinn, the other half of the Anuk-Ite, attacks Scott, Liam and Finch, while Theo wounds Aaron in a fight, inflicting pain on Quinn in the process. This enables Aaron and Quinn to find each other and merge into the complete Anuk-Ite. Later, Scott has sex with Malia, consummating their relationship. The Anuk-Ite allies with Gerard to destroy Scott.
99	19	"Broken Glass"	Tim Andrew	Lindsay Jewett Sturman	September 17, 2017	0.39
In Brazil, Argent tracks down Derek, who is searching for yellow wolfsbane. Kate, who is allied with Gerard and framed Derek for mass murder, arrives and shoots them both, taking the wolfsbane to use against Scott. Gerard and Monroe distribute weapons to most of Beacon Hills' population, but Scott believes the townspeople's fear and hatred are not real, and the war can be averted by destroying the Anuk-Ite. He and Malia enlist Deucalion to teach them how to fight without sight, so they can defeat the Anuk-Ite. Lydia has a vision of her friends petrified and turned to stone. Lydia and Peter track down Scott to warn him, but Monroe and her hunters arrive and open fire, mortally wounding Deucalion. At the same time, Nolan betrays the hunters and leads Liam to the hospital to find captured werewolves, but this is a trap Monroe set up, knowing Nolan planned to betray her. Liam, Mason and Corey are trapped in the hospital as hunters close in.
100	20	"The Wolves of War"	Russell Mulcahy	Jeff Davis	September 24, 2017	0.68
Stiles and Derek return to help Scott and the others. Deucalion dies from his injuries. Gerard broadcasts them a message, which reveals the location of Jackson, Parrish, Liam, Agent McCall, Mason and Corey. Stiles and Derek are updated on the news of the hunters and Anuk-Ite. Melissa rejuvenates Nolan and Peter looks at the Anuk-Ite, turning into stone. Jackson escapes and reunites with Lydia and Stiles. Monroe arrives at the school, and shoots Scott with yellow wolfsbane while Liam and the rest, including Theo, face off against the hunters at the hospital. Sheriff Stilinski rescues Parrish while Scott faces the Anuk-Ite. While fighting it, Scott claws his eyes out to prevent himself from seeing the Anuk-Ite, and manages to defeat it with mountain ash provided by Stiles. The group members trapped at the hospital are saved by the werewolves, Parrish, Stilinski and Agent McCall. Scott is unable to heal his eyes until Malia distracts him with a kiss. Kate kills Gerard while Monroe’s hunters retreat, and Beacon Hills is saved. In the future, with a new beta named Alec, Scott and every member of his pack gather to stop Monroe.

== Production ==
The sixth season of Teen Wolf received an order of 20 episodes on July 9, 2015. Instead of telling a single story, the season was broken into two 10 episode arcs. Filming for the season started on February 22, 2016.

On April 11, 2016, Arden Cho announced she would not be returning for season 6. New recurring characters include Ross Butler as Nathan and Pete Ploszek as Garrett Douglas. Sibongile Mlambo joined the series as Beacon Hills' new humanities teacher and guidance counselor.

Tyler Posey directed the thirteenth episode of the season, which was his first time directing an episode of Teen Wolf. Linden Ashby, who portrays Sheriff Stilinski, directed the fourteenth episode for the season, which was also a first for Ashby.

On March 7, 2017, Meagan Tandy confirmed that, while she was invited back to reprise her role as Braeden, she would not be able to do so due to scheduling conflicts with other television projects.

== Reception ==
The final season received positive reviews, though many expressed disappointment from Dylan O'Brien's absence in the final season and others criticized the show's pacing. The review aggregator website Rotten Tomatoes reported an approval rating of 83% and an average rating of 6.94/10 for the sixth season, based on 12 reviews. The website's critics consensus reads, "The full moon ends its lunar cycle in this fast-paced final season, bringing Teen Wolf to a narratively messy but emotionally satisfying conclusion."
