= Dutch Party (band) =

US musical group

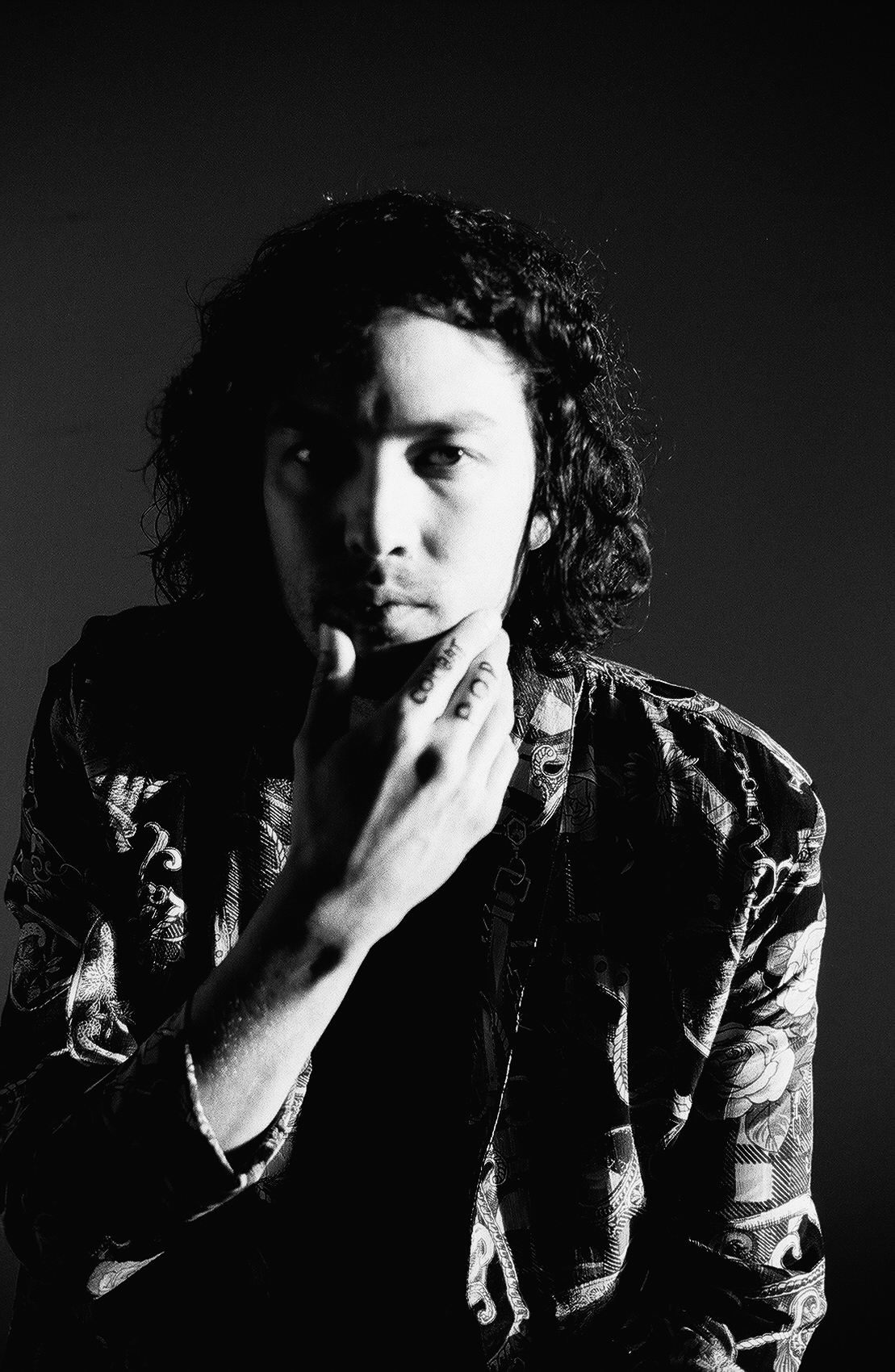
- Ken Franklin of Dutch Party

Background information
- Origin: Los Angeles, California
- Genres: Alternative, indie pop, rock and roll, combat pop
- Members: Ken Franklin
- Website: http://www.dutchpartymusic.com

Dutch Party is an American rock band from Los Angeles, California. Formed in 2014, the band's music is written, recorded and produced by lead singer, Ken Franklin.

== Early life and influences ==
Lead singer and multi-instrumentalist Ken Franklin began writing and playing music while attending Ruth Asawa San Francisco School of the Arts. Using an old TEAC A-2340 Reel-to-Reel tape machine, he began recording home demos. In 2013 Franklin moved back to Los Angeles and began working on what would later become Astral Nights, with music producer Matthew Moore during his studio's off-hours. In 2014, an early version of Storm of the Century caught the attention of DJ Brendan Fallis who subsequently played it for Matte Babel, label head of Ransom Music Group and former correspondent for Much Music and Fuse News, who signed the band.

Franklin has cited David Bowie as one of his preeminent influences, as well as Motown, The Beatles, and The Velvet Underground. Franklin later found inspiration in Unknown Mortal Orchestra, William Onyeabor, LCD Soundsystem, Talking Heads, Leonard Cohen, ELO, minimalist composer Max Richter and early 1990s hip-hop.

== Career ==
In December 2014, Dutch Party released their debut singles, Paper Moon and Echo Girl. The release was premiered by Billboard, and included a video for Echo Girl featuring Sione Maraschino, who was also featured in Meghan Trainor's All About That Bass video that same year. The release garnered rave reviews, in which Billboard call Dutch Party "a spry, good-vibin' indie pop band" who "know how to get a drum-and-bass groove going", and compared them to "Spoon's jaunty, piano-based hooks and the easygoing L.A. vibes of bands from Cold War Kids to Rilo Kiley.” The singles garnered additional press attention from multiple outlets including Kick Kick Snare, who praised them for “creating music reminiscent of a simplistic 70s paisley cool hunted for at flea markets" and their "refreshing tone".

In April 2015, Dutch Party released their first EP, Astral Nights, along with a music video for Paper Moon. The EP Astral Nights was released through Complex-owned Pigeons and Planes, and the music video for Paper Moon featured actress Holland Roden (MTV's Teen Wolf). Pigeons and Planes gave a positive review, commending Dutch Party for "cornering the market for laid-back, minimalist funk rock.” The band's EP was featured by various outlets including All Things Go, Just Jared, Free Bike Valet and Wild Honey Pie, who noted the similarities of Astral Nights to Vampire Weekend, Beck, Spoon and Regina Spektor. Astral Nights also received support from celebrities Nina Dobrev, Youngblood Hawke and Alexa Chung.

In May 2015, French label and fashion house Kitsune included Dutch Party's song Howl on their America 4 compilation At the Drive In, alongside Twin Peaks, St Lucia, and Toro Y Moi. Kitsune used Howl in advance of the compilation's release to promote the collection, premiering the song on Complex's partner site, Earmilk, who commended Dutch Party's "natural feel for indie pop [which] flows from every crevice of their sound." Australian music outlet, Purple Sneakers, also reviewed Howl, noting the "natural, relaxing, warm indie pop" vibe of the band.

In February 2016, Dutch Party released the single Lost Boy, and video for Howl, on The Fader, who called the release a “double dose of sun-bleached pop.” With this song, Dutch Party segued more into writing pop music with purpose, and Kevin Bronson of Buzzbands.LA praised them for "finding inspiration in current affairs... rather than sticking to lovelorn ditties."

In 2016, Dutch Party released the traditional folk song The Passenger for 2016 Presidential candidate, Bernie Sanders. They also collaborated with French electronic music producer Uppermost on his song Watch You Blaze, and with Fool's Gold's Luke Top on two tracks set to be released in 2017.

They have played at live concerts around California, including Good Day LA in advance of the release of their EP and the Raw Artists music festival in Orange County in 2015, and Eric Lilavois’ Make Music Pasadena Festival in 2016.

In August 2017, Dutch Party released their first single Blade Runner from their second EP Combat Pop through Huffington Post, who stated: "Combining infectious guitar melodies with beautiful and poignant lyricism, the single is sure to follow suit with their previous critical and commercial acclaim." Franklin said of the EP: "Music is one of the most immediate forms of deep communication. The world is vibrating constantly, and our goal with Combat Pop is to subvert the current buzzing order. We wanted to make a pop record that was sonically left of center, and bursting with questions."

In October 2017, Dutch Party's single Now and Later debuted on Noisey, who described it as a "buzzy new song" with a "hooky cut". Franklin stated that "[Now and Later] is all about the stuff you burn for. Not just the momentary impulses - though often it feels the same - but the deep-seated, almost biological desires," and that it arrived via "this mosquito of a guitar lick". The music video for the song was inspired by the 1961 film The Hustler.

== Discography ==
Year	Title	Label	Notes
2015	Astral Nights	Independent	EP
2015	Howl	Independent	Single
2016	Lost Boy	Independent	Single
2016	Passenger	Independent	Single
2017	Combat Pop	Independent	EP
2017	Now and Later	Independent	Single

== Use in media ==
Dutch Party's tracks have been featured in the television shows Finding Carter, Switched at Birth and Shadowhunters.
