= It Felt Like Love =

2013 film by Eliza Hittman

- Film poster
- Directed by: Eliza Hittman
- Written by: Eliza Hittman
- Produced by: Eliza Hittman; Shrihari Sathe; Laura Wagner
- Starring: Gina Piersanti; Giovanna Salimeni; Ronen Rubinstein; Jesse Cordasco; Nicolas Rosen; Richie Folio; Kevin Anthony Ryan; Case Prime
- Cinematography: Sean Porter
- Edited by: Carlos Marques-Marcet; Scott Cummings
- Production companies: Bay Bridge Productions Inc. Infinitum Productions; The Group Entertainment; Verisimilitude
- Distributed by: Variance Films
- Release dates: January 19, 2013 (Sundance Film Festival); March 21, 2014
- Running time: 82 minutes
- Country: United States
- Language: English

It Felt Like Love is a 2013 independent drama film and the directorial debut of Eliza Hittman. It premiered at the Sundance Film Festival and was later acquired by Variance Films, receiving a limited theatrical release in March 2014. The film follows the coming-of-age of teenager Lila as she riskily courts the attentions of an older boy.

== Plot ==
Lila, a fourteen-year-old girl who lives in Brooklyn with her widowed father, wants to be like her more sexually experienced friend Chiara. Lila and Chiara are in the same dance class and are spending the summer preparing for a big performance. Although Chiara is more experienced, she has only made it to third base with her boyfriend Patrick. Lila likes to portray herself as similarly experienced, when in reality her primary exposure to sex is tagging along on Chiara and Patrick's outings and being an awkward bystander to the couple's public displays of affection. One day at the beach, Lila makes eye contact with the older and tough Sammy. Hearing that Sammy is the type of guy who will "sleep with anyone," Lila aggressively pursues Sammy, going to the arcade where he works and telling friends she is in a relationship with him. Sammy is clearly not interested in Lila and sees her as just a kid, but he does not outright reject her advances, either.

Lila increasingly puts herself in dangerously vulnerable situations in order to get Sammy's attention. She goes alone to Sammy's apartment, where Sammy is hanging out with his male friends as porn plays on the TV. At one point, Sammy's friends start making crude jokes about Lila giving all of the guys simultaneous oral sex. Lila, naïve and hungry for male attention, laughs along with the jokes. After this scene, Lila is shown taking a bus back to her home. The question of whether Lila actually did anything sexual with the guys is left open to interpretation. The film ends with the performance of Lila and Chiara's dance team, with visuals that underscore the rocky terrain of adolescence.

== Cast ==
- Gina Piersanti as Lila
- Giovanna Salimeni as Chiara
- Ronen Rubinstein as Sammy
- Kevin Anthony Ryan as Lila's father
- Jesse Cordasco as Patrick
- Nicolas Rosen as Devon
- Case Prime as Nate

== Production ==
Hittman utilized the microblogging website Tumblr as part of the casting process for the film. Filming took place in the summer of 2012, lasting 18 days with a crew of 11 people.

== Release ==
It Felt Like Love premiered at the 2013 Sundance Film Festival, and subsequently screened at such festivals as International Film Festival Rotterdam, Maryland Film Festival and Giffoni Film Festival. It was acquired by Variance Films in November 2013 for a limited theatrical release on March 21, 2014. The film was released on video by Kino Lorber on July 29, 2014.

== Reception ==
It Felt Like Love received critical acclaim. On review aggregator website Rotten Tomatoes, the film has an approval rating of 84% based on 25 reviews. Writing for The New York Times, Jeannette Catsoulis said the film is "a mood poem to summer loving and sexual awakening...powerfully [evoking] a time when flesh is paramount, and peer behavior is the standard by which we judge our own". She noted Hittman and cinematographer Sean Porter "remind us of the dangers of teenage desire and...the vast gulf between male and female notions of romantic connection".

Of the film, Inkoo Kang of the Los Angeles Times said, "Rarely has the zone between girlhood and womanhood been captured with such urgent honesty than in Eliza Hittman’s superb teen drama...Hittman’s debut isn’t just a brilliantly tactile study of the mounting sexual curiosity and frustration of 14-year-old Lila (Gina Piersanti); it’s also an important landmark in the oft-ignored subgenre of realistic movies about female adolescence".

Writing for RogerEbert.com, Matt Zoller Seitz praised the film as "tremendously accomplished", but also said the film falls short of a fuller character study.
