= No Escape (2020 film) =

2020 film by Will Wernick

- Film poster
- Directed by: Will Wernick
- Written by: Will Wernick
- Produced by: Sonia Lisette; Will Wernick
- Starring: Keegan Allen; Holland Roden; Denzel Whitaker; Ronen Rubinstein; Pasha D. Lychnikoff; George Janko; Siya
- Cinematography: Jason Goodell
- Edited by: Cris Mertens
- Music by: Crystal Grooms Mangano
- Production company: Escape Productions
- Distributed by: Vertical Entertainment
- Release dates: July 16, 2020 (Australia); September 18, 2020 (United States)
- Running time: 91 minutes
- Country: United States
- Language: English
- Box office: $4.3 Million

No Escape, internationally known as Follow Me, is a 2020 American independent adventure horror mystery film written and directed by Will Wernick, and starring Keegan Allen, Holland Roden, Denzel Whitaker, Ronen Rubinstein, Pasha D. Lychnikoff, George Janko and Siya.

== Plot ==
Cole Turner is an image-obsessed internet celebrity with millions of followers on his channel, "Escape From Reality". He often does live video and posts photos and videos on his YouTube channel.

To celebrate the tenth anniversary of his channel, Cole, his girlfriend Erin, and his friends Dash, Samantha, and Thomas go to Moscow in order to partake in an escape room that Dash organised with the help of Alexei Koslov, a wealthy Russian fan of Cole's.

In Moscow, they meet Alexei and his girlfriend Viktoria, and spend the evening at a dodgy club. However, after being harassed and threatened by a pair of Russian mobsters, they return to Alexei's mansion.

On the day of the escape room, Alexei takes Cole's phone and connects it to the surveillance system so it can be streamed to his fans live and millions of people can watch. Alexei warns the group the escape room is extreme and unpredictable. They are all blindfolded and led to their starting positions in the escape room. Cole is placed into a dark room with a dead Russian soldier and a table of surgical equipment. He cuts open the dead body and retrieves a key from the man's stomach. He finds the other four connected to realistic deadly traps. He completes a cog puzzle to free Thomas and Dash seconds before they are killed, and the three complete a maze puzzle to free Samantha. The four find Erin in a glass box slowly filling with water. Erin nearly drowns, but Cole uses one of the cogs to smash open the lock and free her. After they realize the game is genuinely dangerous, they escape the room but are captured by Andrei, one of the mobsters from the club. He kills Viktoria, knocks Cole unconscious and kidnaps the others.

Cole wakes tied up in a small cell. On a screen, he witnesses Andrei kill Samantha. Whilst escaping through an air duct, he watches Dash have his limbs sawn off to 'entertain' Andrei's own online fanbase. Cole finds Thomas and they attempt to escape together, but Thomas is pushed down an old elevator shaft by one of the guards. He learns that Alexei works for the mobsters and organized the trap, and finds Erin tied to a chair.

Andrei threatens to kill Erin. Cole tries to shoot him but misses, and Andrei shoots Erin in the head. Two guards drag Cole to another locked room. He finds a small duct and crawls through it into a large dark room. Alexei is there waiting for him and filming on his phone. Cole attacks and beats Alexei to death out of anger for killing his friends.

It is revealed the entire experience was an elaborate prank organized by his friends to celebrate his tenth anniversary, with every aspect of the escape room being carefully planned to shock Cole. The lights turn on to reveal Erin and his friends still alive, looking in shock as Cole sits next to Alexei's corpse while his millions of followers send horrified messages in the livestream.

== Cast ==
- Keegan Allen as Cole Turner
  - Sebastian L Hunt as Young Cole
- Holland Roden as Erin Isaacs
- Denzel Whitaker as Thomas
  - Tristan Lee Griffin as Young Thomas
- Ronen Rubinstein as Alexei Koslov
- Pasha D. Lychnikoff as Andrei
- George Janko as Dash Hill
- Siya as Samantha "Sam" Mato
- Emilia Ares as Viktoria
- Kimberly Quinn as Laura Turner

== Release ==
The film was released in theaters and on demand and digital on September 18, 2020.

== Reception ==
The film has a 38% rating based on 13 reviews on Rotten Tomatoes. JoBlo.com gave the film a 4 out of 10.

== Marketing ==
On July 10, 2020, social media accounts were set up for the film ahead of its Australian theatrical release.
