= Mia Serafino =

American actress

- Born: April 19, 1989 (age 37)
- Occupation: Actress
- Years active: 2009–present

Mia Serafino is an American actress. She is best known for playing Stella Moore in the sitcom series Crowded and Karen in the horror film Smiley Face Killers.

== Early life ==
Serafino is from Detroit, Michigan. She became interested in acting from watching The Wizard of Oz when she was 4 and dressing up as characters from it. She was an avid figure skater growing up. She cites her high school teacher Dr. Moss for giving her the confidence that she could become an actress. She is a graduate of the Chicago College of Performing Arts at Roosevelt University

== Career ==
Early in her career she made a one off appearance in the comedy drama series Shameless portraying Gigi. She appeared alongside Madison Lawlor in the drama film Juicy Stories. Her first big role came playing Stella Moore in the sitcom Crowded opposite Miranda Cosgrove. She played the lead role of Emma in the comedy film Electric Love. She played Ali MacGraw in the comedy drama film Zeroville starring James Franco. She had a main role in the horror film Smiley Face Killers playing Karen.

== Filmography ==
=== Film ===
Year	Title	Role	Notes
2009	The Butterfly Effect 3: Revelations	Rebecca Brown	
2012	Hitchcock	Secretary	
2012	Forever Love	Sarah	
2013	Oz: The Great and Powerful	Emerald City Citizen	
2013	Bukowski	Jimmy's Girlfriend	
2013	Approaching Midnight	Whisper	
2013	Saving Mr. Banks	Young Woman	
2014	Mom and Dad Undergrads	Lacy	
2015	Ken Jeong Made Me Do It	Caitlin	
2015	Secrets of a Psychopath	Georgette	
2016	All at Once	Beth Clarke	
2017	The Labyrinth	Leonor	
2018	Electric Love	Emma	
2018	Juicy Stories	Gela	
2018	Now and Then	Emily	
2019	Zeroville	Ali MacGraw	
2020	Film Fest	Dana	
2020	Smiley Face Killers	Keren	
2023	Maximum Truth	Misa	

=== Television ===
Year	Title	Role	Notes
2012	90210	Beautiful Female Partner	Episode; Into the Wild
2014	Undateable	Hot Woman	Episode; Pants Buddies
2014	Franklin & Bash	T.A.	Episode; The Curse of Hor-Aha
2015	NCIS: Los Angeles	Lisa Welsey	Episode; Spiral
2015	Shameless	Gigi	Episode; The Two Lisas
2015	Scorpion	Zoe	Episode; Going South
2015	Your Family or Mine	Lana	Episode; Presents
2015	Stitchers	Janice	2 episodes
2016	Crowded	Stella Moore	13 episodes
2017	Young & Hungry	Marissa	Episode; Young & Hold
2019-2020	Airport Security Squad	Sky	5 episodes
2023	Beef	Mia	4 episodes
2022-2023	iCarly	Pearl	8 episodes
