= Sweet Crude =

- Directed by: Sandy Cioffi
- Written by: Leslye Wood; Sandy Cioffi; Jill Freidberg
- Produced by: Kate Wolf; Sandy Cioffi; Laurie Hicks; Kathleen McInnis; Tammi Sims
- Cinematography: Sean Porter
- Edited by: Jill Freidberg
- Music by: Julie Wolf
- Release dates: June 3, 2009 (Seattle International Film Festival); August 14, 2009 (United States)
- Running time: 93 minutes
- Country: United States
- Language: English

Sweet Crude is a documentary film about Nigeria's oil-rich Niger Delta directed by Sandy Cioffi. The film premiered in April 2009 at the Full Frame Documentary Film Festival and has since screened at 30 film festivals around the world and has won numerous awards.

On April 12, 2008, members of the Sweet Crude filmmaking crew were detained by the Nigerian military Joint Task Force while traveling by boat in the Niger Delta. The crew was taken into custody and subsequently handed over to the Nigerian State Security Services. They were held for seven days without being charged and without access to legal counsel. They were released Friday, April 18.

From the Sweet Crude website:

The region is seething and the global stakes are high. But in this moment, there’s an opportunity to find solutions. What if the world paid attention before it was too late?

== Film review ==
“A look at the very human cost of Nigeria’s oil wealth.” -- Christiane Amanpour from CNN
“The film is beautiful and stark. It clarifies the complex. And there’s poetry throughout. In other words, you want to check it out.” -- Laura Flanders, from GRIT TV
“Add the petrohorrors in the Niger Delta to the ‘price of oil.’ There is nothing ‘sweet’ there, but the oil industry’s profits.” -- Ralph Nader
“A provocative portrait of human devastation ignored in the name of commerce and oil.” -- Seattle Weekly
“It’s typical of the film’s calm fury that the arrest of the filmmaker last year by Nigerian authorities is relegated to a brief epilogue; the real story is more significant than that.” -- Film Critic Robert Horton 1

== Film Importance ==
Why are we so concerned about making this film? “After 50 years and $700 billion in oil sucked out of the ground by Royal Dutch Shell and its co-conspirator, Chevron, the Niger Delta is among the most polluted places on Earth,” says UC Berkeley geography professor Michael Watts. Because raising awareness may be the turning point to stop the civil war. Because children in the delta deserve a future. Because what happened in Nigeria affected the political stability of Africa and the global economic market. Because Nigeria produces more than 10% of American oil supply. In the end, what happened in the Niger Delta affected us all. On February 9, 2007, the sweet crude oil in the spot market of the United States weakened on the news of export reduction and possible cancellation of spot goods in Nigeria. In Nigeria, the national oil company announced that it would reduce the export volume of 250,000 barrels and 300,000 barrels per day in February and March. Part of the announced reduction in production may be due to the production interruption caused by the radical attack Local rebels who are dissatisfied with this industry in Niger Delta. Therefore, before the filming of Sweet Crude, the conflict of oil resources already was having a significant impact on the global oil market, especially in the United States.

== Author's inspiration for production ==
Sandy Cioffi first went to the Niger Delta to film the process of building a library in a small village, which was shared by a set of ethnic groups who were formerly in conflict. In this process, she was completely attracted by the children and mothers in the village, who were carrying a huge burden in trying to survive on the land razed to the ground by oil production. “There was one mother in particular who really had my number when she grabbed my hand and got me to run past an armed oil company security officer with my camera to film a gas flare raging in her village, leaving her children with a one-in-five chance of dying before their 5th birthday.” Said Sandy. So, she saw through the lie that the oil company promised that the land there would not burn again and promised that “I would make a movie”. Therefore, Sandy Cioffi first interviewed local oil exploration companies, such as Chevron. When she went on a field trip to Niger Delta, she found that what she saw was quite different from what the company mentioned. The tragic situation of local residents inspired her shooting and creation. It can be said that her inspiration comes from reality and the lies of local high-level officials.

== Current situation of Nigeria ==
“In 2021, the Organization of Petroleum Exporting Countries (OPEC) decided to inject 400,000 barrels of crude oil into the market every month from August. Yesterday, it pushed the oil price to an all-time low of $69 per barrel, but Nigeria's low sulfur crude oil Bunny Light is still bullish at $75.23. Because of the influence of this film, governments and media in various countries attach importance to Nigeria, and the Nigerian government has to improve its oil exploitation methods. However, whenever oil prices rise or fall, Nigeria usually faces a dilemma. Although the price increase has stabilized the government's revenue, because there is no fully functional oil refinery in the country, when the price of crude oil drops, the subsidies for petroleum products will also decrease.” We can find that Nigeria is a big oil exporter, and the price fluctuation of oil products will have a great impact on the local oil industry, such as the reduction of subsidies. The reduction of subsidies means that Nigerian oil companies need to bear more costs for local oil exploitation and technology research and development, which in turn increases the difficulty of technological upgrading. Throughout the history of oil price changes, oil price changes are cyclical, and this cycle is not long, which leads to the technical downturn of Nigeria's oil industry and affects the country's economic development, thus causing a vicious circle. And because of the influence of movies, the media in various countries pay great attention to the conflict in Niger Delta, which also hinders its economic development to a certain extent. “Since 2019, the market of low sulfur crude oil is turning, and the price of Angola heavy sweet crude oil is higher than that of Nigeria light crude oil. As the diesel market starts to strengthen further before IMO 2020, the price difference of Nigerian light sweet crude oil may also start to soar. Since July 2019, Dalia in Angola has been at a premium to Bonny Light in Nigeria, because refineries are scrambling to find heavy sweet barrels. On the other hand, Angola produces nearly 1.4 million barrels of heavy crude oil with low sulfur content every day-low sulfur content, but a large amount of fuel oil and gas oil can be produced after refining. Because the sulfur content of its fuel oil is very low, this barrel has become a must-buy crude oil for refineries that want to produce marine diesel.” Therefore, compared with neighboring countries, Nigeria's oil industry is not competitive enough, and the vicious circle of local economic development and oil industry development makes it difficult to exploit its oil, which in turn makes it difficult to reduce the export price due to cost, and its oil exploitation is not as good as that of Angola and other countries. This further reduces the competitiveness of Nigeria's oil industry, and because of the influence of movies, local oil industry companies and governments dare not take drastic measures to exploit, so the cost is difficult to control.

== Awards ==
Sweet Crude has been nominated at Oaxaca Film Fest.
