= Crowded (TV series) =

American television sitcom

- Genre: Sitcom
- Created by: Suzanne Martin
- Starring: Patrick Warburton; Carrie Preston; Miranda Cosgrove; Mia Serafino; Stacy Keach; Carlease Burke
- Theme music composer: Jesse Novak
- Composer: Jesse Novak
- Country of origin: United States
- Original language: English
- No. of seasons: 1
- No. of episodes: 13

Production
- Executive producers: James Burrows; Sean Hayes; Suzanne Martin; Todd Milliner
- Producer: Patrick Warburton
- Camera setup: Multi-camera
- Running time: 21–22 minutes
- Production companies: Hazy Mills Productions; SamJen Productions; Universal Television

Original release
- Network: NBC
- Release: March 15 – May 22, 2016

Crowded is an American sitcom television series that aired on NBC from March 15 to May 22, 2016. The series was created by Suzanne Martin, executive produced by Martin, Sean Hayes and Todd Milliner, through their Hazy Mills Productions, and produced in association with Universal Television. Like their other series Hot in Cleveland, this multi-camera sitcom is recorded in front of a live studio audience. The series was greenlit to order by NBC on May 7, 2015. The show debuted as a mid-season entry in the 2015–16 television season, with a 13-episode order.

On May 13, 2016, NBC cancelled the series after one season.

== Premise ==
Mike and Martina Moore put aside their plans and newfound freedom when their two adult daughters, Stella and Shea, unexpectedly move back into their Seattle home after 4 years in college to figure out what they will do with their lives. Mike also learns that his retired father Bob and his stepmother Alice have decided to stay in town to help with Stella and Shea instead of moving to Florida. The family has to learn to live together again, despite the reluctance of Mike and Martina.

== Cast and characters ==
=== Main ===
- Patrick Warburton as Mike Moore, a 47-year old helicopter pilot.
- Carrie Preston as Martina Moore, a therapist.
- Miranda Cosgrove as Shea Moore, the younger daughter of Mike and Martina who has a PhD in Astrophysics from MIT. She moves back in with her parents after funding for her research job is eliminated.
- Mia Serafino as Stella Moore, the older daughter of Mike and Martina who has a degree in Theatre Arts. She moves back in with her parents after not being able to get acting jobs or hits on her YouTube channel.
- Stacy Keach as Bob Moore, Mike's father. He is a retired police officer who runs his own bar, Bob's Blue Room.
- Carlease Burke as Alice Moore, Bob's second wife and Mike's stepmother. She works as a prison security guard.

=== Recurring ===
- Clifford McGhee as Ethan Ellis, Alice's son and Mike's stepbrother. His status as a former professional golfer stems from having the yips, a deficiency he developed during his career, and has moved into the Moore household to get back on his feet. He is also shown to be interested in Shea, despite being her step-uncle.

=== Guest ===
- David Spade as Kyle, Mike's high-school bully who has landed in jail.
- Betty White as Sandy, one of Martina's patients who moves into the Moore house and refuses to leave.
- Jane Leeves as Gwen, one of Martina's patients and Sandy's daughter.
- Carol Kane as Fake Linda, a woman who claims to be Mike's mother at one of his old addresses.
- Debra Monk as Linda Davis, Mike's mom who was hiding from the law in Bob's cabin.

== Episodes ==
| No. | Title | Directed by | Written by | Original release date | Prod. code | US viewers (millions) |
|---|---|---|---|---|---|---|
| 1 | "Pilot" | James Burrows | Suzanne Martin | March 15, 2016 | 101 | 6.52 |
The first episode of the series introduces newly-empty nest couple Mike and Martina Moore. The couple's adult daughters, Stella and Shea, both move back in with their parents, while Mike's retired parents decide not to move to Florida.
| 2 | "Present Tense" | James Burrows | Suzanne Martin | March 15, 2016 | 102 | 5.06 |
Mike and Martina realize that they haven't had sex since the girls moved back in, so each of them tries to resolve the issue in a different way. Meanwhile, Shea tries to meet a guy with Stella's help through a dating app called "Toast Up".
| 3 | "Brother" | James Burrows | Claudia Lonow | March 20, 2016 | 103 | 3.75 |
Mike's stepbrother Ethan (Clifford McGhee) comes to town, causing Mike to have to deal with Bob's blatant favoritism. Meanwhile, Shea and Stella team up to beat Mike and Martina at family game night after learning that their parents had been letting them win all these years.
| 4 | "RearviewMirror" | James Burrows | Sam Johnson & Chris Marcil | March 27, 2016 | 108 | 3.52 |
Mike learns that Kyle (David Spade), a guy who bullied him in school, is now in prison. Shunning his father's advice, Mike decides to pay Kyle a visit (with Martina in tow) to show off to him how well his life has turned out, only to find out that Kyle is innocent and needs his help in clearing his name. Meanwhile, Mike's actions inspire Stella to meet up with a nerd she once bullied named Elliot (Chad Jamain Williams) in order to make an amends with him, only to become interested in him. She enlists Shea's help in winning Elliot over, only for the latter to end up being interested in him as well.
| 5 | "Amongst the Waves" | James Burrows | Tom Hertz | April 3, 2016 | 105 | 3.47 |
In an effort to hang out with people closer to their own age, Mike and Martina set up their recently separated neighbor John with one of Mike's female co-workers and invite them for a double-date, only to take a turn that they didn't expect. Meanwhile, Bob expresses his distaste in lying on resumes to Shea and Stella by rejecting the latter's request to add him as a reference, so the girls ask him if they can prove their skills by managing the bar while he takes Alice out for the evening.
| 6 | "Nothing As It Seems" | Andy Cadiff | Kellie R. Griffin | April 10, 2016 | 106 | 4.19 |
As the family prepares to watch a screening of The Bodyguard to honor Bob and Alice's first date, Mike finds a positive pregnancy test on the stairs. After eliminating Martina and Stella, Mike worries that Shea might be pregnant, especially upon seeing that she and Ethan appear to be hiding something. Meanwhile, Alice becomes irritated at Bob for forgetting most of the events of their first date.
| 7 | "The Fixer" | Andy Cadiff | Chelsea Myers | April 17, 2016 | 107 | 5.15 |
Sandy (Betty White) and Gwen (Jane Leeves), a mother and daughter, are visiting Martina as patients. Sandy attends to an ill Mike when Martina ignores him, leading Mike to quickly treat her as his mother and Sandy to refuse leaving. Meanwhile, Shea and Bob seek advice from Sandy on their respective dilemmas on dating fellow intern Nate (Sterling Knight) and on suspecting Alice's potential infidelity, while Stella tries to learn Gwen's British accent for an upcoming community theatre role and gives her a makeover in return.
| 8 | "Given to Fly" | James Burrows | Josh Greenberg | April 17, 2016 | 104 | 4.03 |
Mike invites Bob to ride along in the helicopter on the same morning the local traffic reporter passes out from a long night of drinking. Bob ad-libs the traffic report that appears horrible, but to his and Mike's surprise, the TV station's audience enjoys their bickering, including Bob's racist remarks. Meanwhile, Martina, Shea, Stella and Alice try to locate Mike's mother, whom he hasn't seen in years. They track down a woman (Carol Kane) who claims to be his mother at one of his old addresses.
| 9 | "Unemployable" | James Burrows | Sabrina Jalees | April 24, 2016 | 109 | 3.00 |
Both Shea and Stella start earning money and actually pay rent to their parents, and while Mike and Martina are thrilled with Shea quickly moving up the ladder of the food business despite starting off at an entry-level position at a burger chain restaurant, they also learn that Stella makes a living as a Webcam girl and try to talk her out of it. Meanwhile, Bob's end-of-life planning doesn't sit well with Alice.
| 10 | "Better Man" | Andy Cadiff | Jaclyn Moore | May 1, 2016 | 110 | 3.03 |
Mike finds a Viagra pill that fell out of Stella's bag and, even though he didn't need it before to perform well in bed, he and Martina mutually agree that they should try it, only to regret knowing how gratifying it could be. Soon, Bob takes Mike's lead and tries a pill himself, only for him to get hooked on it as well. Meanwhile, Shea finds an anti-anxiety pill that also fell out of Stella's bag and gets caught in a dilemma on whether or not she should continue using it in order to calm her down for her upcoming job interview at the Weissman Space Center.
| 11 | "Daughter" | James Burrows | Emily Heller | May 8, 2016 | 111 | 2.69 |
Mike tries to justify accepting front-row seats to see his favorite band, Pearl Jam, from a drummer Stella is seeing, even after learning that her boyfriend is married. Meanwhile, Shea joins Alice to her poker game to prevent the former from texting or calling Nate back after their first night together and Martina and Bob visit a shooting range.
| 12 | "In Hiding" | Stan Lathan | Steve Vitolo | May 15, 2016 | 112 | 3.09 |
When Martina, Shea and Stella go to a male strip club and see Ethan with his arm on another man's shoulder, they assume that Ethan's gay. However, they discover that the guy he's with is his injured friend who he's helping and that he's moonlighting as a dancer, making Shea see Ethan in a more attractive way. And while the rest of the family seem fine with it, Bob shows his disapproval with Ethan pursuing a new career. Meanwhile, Mike and Bob compete over who is more attractive to other men in the strip club.
| 13 | "Come Back" | James Burrows | Kellie R. Griffin | May 22, 2016 | 113 | 2.12 |
When Alice has to skip out on a weekend with Bob at their remote cabin, Mike convinces him to stay home for him and Martina to use the cabin for themselves and get away from their girls. Chaos soon ensues as, one by one, the entire family shows up at the cabin, beginning with Mike's estranged mother Linda (Debra Monk).

== Production ==
On November 24, 2015, James Burrows directed an episode of the series, which was the 1,000th television episode directed by Burrows throughout his career.

== Reception ==
Crowded received mixed reviews from critics. The review aggregator website Rotten Tomatoes reported a 35% approval rating. The website's consensus read, "A talented cast is left with no room to flourish in Crowded, a misfire whose dated feel is compounded by a pronounced lack of laughs." On Metacritic, the series scored 45 out of 100 based on 16 reviews, indicating "mixed or average reviews".
