= Smiley Face Killers (film) =

2020 film directed by Tim Hunter

- Film poster
- Directed by: Tim Hunter
- Written by: Bret Easton Ellis
- Produced by: Braxton Pope; Bret Easton Ellis; David M. Wulf
- Starring: Ronen Rubinstein; Mia Serafino; Crispin Glover
- Cinematography: Michael Marius Pessah; Jan Wielski
- Edited by: Kristi Shimek
- Music by: Kristin Kontrol
- Production companies: Grindstone Entertainment Group; Highland Film Group; DTLV Cinema Society; Silver State Productions
- Distributed by: Lionsgate Home Entertainment
- Release date: December 8, 2020
- Running time: 96 minutes
- Country: United States
- Language: English

Smiley Face Killers is a 2020 American slasher film directed by Tim Hunter and written by Bret Easton Ellis, who is also one of the producers. The film stars Ronen Rubinstein, Mia Serafino, and Crispin Glover. It is loosely based on the Smiley face murder theory.

== Plot ==
The film opens with the abduction and murder of two unrelated victims by a hooded killer in a white van. The only clue linking the murders is the presence of smiley face graffiti near the body. The film then shows Jake, a university student who believes that someone is stalking him, as they have left him a map marking the locations of the prior smiley face murders along with creepy text messages and photos. His girlfriend Keren is concerned that he is off his psychiatric medication, particularly after he grows jealous of her talking to her ex-boyfriend Rob. Jake relates the strange events to his friend Adam, who theorizes that Rob may be doing them out of jealousy. He begins to investigate the map and messages with more earnest, all the time unaware that the stalker, a mysterious hooded figure, has murdered his roommate Devon.

Jake discovers messages from Rob on Keren's phone and the two argue, causing her to further worry and assume that his concerns are due to not taking his meds. He continues the fight later when he discovers Rob at a party, during which he pushes Keren. Upset, Jake leaves the party and is swiftly abducted by his stalker and two other hooded figures, one of whom begins to drain his blood. An attempt to free himself is only momentarily successful and results in the death of a gas station clerk and a group of teenagers who happened to drive up. Jake is then killed by the figures, who dump his body and graffiti a smiley face. Devon's death is eventually discovered and it is generally believed that Jake murdered him. The film ends with the hooded figures stalking their next victim.

== Cast ==
- Ronen Rubinstein as Jake Graham
- Mia Serafino as Keren
- Crispin Glover as Hooded Figure
- Amadeus Serafini as Gabriel
- Ashley Rickards as Alana
- Garrett Coffey as Adam
- Cody Simpson as Rob
- Daniel Covin as Devon
- Gianna DiDonato as Liv
- Rachel Crowl as Woman Killer
- Daniel Dannas as Ryan Elliot
- Corey Prather as Paul Lader
- Reese Mishler as Brandon Douglas

== Production ==
In October 2017, production was announced to have begun. Ronen Rubinstein was cast in the lead role and Crispin Glover in a supporting role, with Tim Hunter directing a screenplay by Bret Easton Ellis.

== Release ==
Smiley Face Killers was released on video on demand, DVD and Blu-ray on December 8, 2020.

== Reception ==
Smiley Face Killers holds a rating of 44% on Rotten Tomatoes, based on nine reviews.

== Marketing ==
On October 8, 2020, the official poster and trailer for the film were unveiled by Lionsgate. Ronen Rubinstein expressed his frustration with the studio's approach to the marketing and apparent lack of support for the film. Following a month-long dispute with the studio, Trenton Ryder confirmed on Twitter the film's social marketing assets were back in his control after being removed ahead of the film's release.
