= Ronen Rubinstein =

American actor (born 1993)

- רונן רובינשטיין
- Born: November 7, 1993 (age 32); Rehovot, Israel
- Citizenship: Israel • United States
- Education: New York Film Academy
- Occupations: Actor; activist; singer
- Years active: 2011–present
- Spouse: Jessica Parker Kennedy (m. 2022)
- Children: 1
- Honours: Master of Fine Arts in Acting for Film (ad honorem)

Ronen Rubinstein (/ˈruːbɪnstaɪn/ ROO-bin-stine, Hebrew: רונן רובינשטיין [ʁoˈnen ʁubinˈʃtejn]; born November 7, 1993) is an Israeli-American actor and frontman of the rock band Nights in Stereo. He is best known for his roles as T. K. Strand in the Fox procedural series 9-1-1: Lone Star, Matt Webb in the FX horror series American Horror Stories, both created by Ryan Murphy, and as Nathan in the Netflix prison drama Orange Is the New Black.

== Early life and education ==
Rubinstein was born in Rehovot, Israel, the son of Russian Jewish immigrants, Tamilla and Efim Rubinstein, from the Kazakh Soviet Socialist Republic. His father, a dentist, served in the Israeli army and did not want the same for his children. When Rubinstein was five years old, he moved with his parents and older sister to the United States, where he grew up in the Staten Island borough of New York City. In an interview, Rubinstein said he felt like an outsider growing up as an immigrant, taking English as a Second Language classes and having difficulty adapting to the American culture.

He was introduced to acting in his second year of high school when his guidance counselor suggested he try theater as a form of therapy and escape from the opioid epidemic in his neighborhood. Rubinstein stated: "Acting did save my life. My future was not looking great. Acting gave me grounds to stand on, it gave me discipline and I fell in love with it." He briefly worked as a dental assistant in his father's dental office, but chose not to follow in his footsteps and become a doctor. After attending New Dorp High School, he decided to pursue an acting career and graduated from a one-year program in Acting for Film at the New York Film Academy.

In December 2023, Rubinstein received an honorary degree of Master of Fine Arts in Acting for Film from the New York Film Academy and served as its commencement speaker.

== Career ==
=== Early work ===
At 16, Rubinstein wrote Something in the Way, his first short film he later directed, produced and starred in. It follows a young Vietnam war veteran who struggles with post-traumatic stress disorder after returning to his civilian life.

He made his screen debut at the age of 17 as a teenage rebel named Gangsta in the 2011 psychological drama film Detachment, starring Bryan Cranston, Adrien Brody, and James Caan.

In his senior year of high school, Rubinstein landed a leading role in It Felt Like Love, Eliza Hittman's coming-of-age film shot in intimate close-ups with minimal dialogue, which premiered at the 2013 Sundance Film Festival. He portrayed Sammy, a tough, misogynistic college boy from a working-class Brooklyn neighborhood, described by The New York Times as a "weed-smoking, pornography-watching bad boy whose contempt for women is as potent as his pheromones". The film received a nomination for best cinematography at the Film Independent Spirit Awards as well as nominations at the Gotham Awards.

In the following year, he was cast as the lead in Some Kind of Hate, portraying a young introverted victim of severe bullying. He also appeared in another Sundance Film Festival drama film, Jamie Marks Is Dead, starring Cameron Monaghan and Liv Tyler.

=== 2015–2019 ===
In 2015, Rubinstein guest starred in episode 10, season 3 of Netflix's most-watched original series, Orange Is the New Black, portraying the respectful and caring Nathan, Tiffany "Pennsatucky" Doggett's love interest, which brought him to mainstream attention.

In 2016, he was a series regular as Alex Powell in Freeform's Dead of Summer.

In 2018, he appeared in the role of Mike in the comedy drama Dude alongside Lucy Hale and Awkwafina. The film was Olivia Milch's directional debut. Rubinstein, having worked with several first-time female directors (which he called "an absolute honor"), advocated for gender equality in filmmaking and praised Milch as "a future star director". The film also had a female cinematographer which he called "so rare", stating that "there is not enough women in the industry".

His other credits include a supporting role in the comedy drama Smartass (2017) opposite Joey King, a supporting role in Less Than Zero, a 2019's adaptation of Bret Easton Ellis's debut novel, as well as a lead role in the anthology film Brooklyn Love Stories (2019), available on demand on February 2, 2021.

=== 2020–present ===
In 2020, he starred as an openly gay firefighter and recovering opioid addict Tyler Kennedy "TK" Strand in Ryan Murphy's Fox series 9-1-1: Lone Star, alongside Rob Lowe, who plays Captain Owen Strand, TK's father, and Liv Tyler. The series has become Fox's most watched new show of 2020 among 18-49 adults and has received acclaim for its interracial gay storyline and diverse characters, such as a hijab-wearing Muslim female firefighter and a black transgender male firefighter (portrayed by the transgender actor Brian Michael Smith). In a 2020 interview, Rubinstein said: "I think people for the first time, at least on network television, are seeing themselves on screen, and they feel represented, and they feel represented in a really positive, lovely, good way." His role of a gay firefighter inspired real life gay first responders to come out to him through social media. He has praised Ryan Murphy and the writers for normalizing a same-sex relationship on primetime television without including a coming out story: "A lot of times you'd see a gay couple on television there's something really dramatic and usually sad involved with it. And this is just like, 'Yeah, this is just normal. This is just how it is'." The series received a GLAAD Media Award nomination for Outstanding Drama Series.

Rubinstein stars as the antagonist Alexei in Follow Me, a thriller about the dangers of influencer culture on social media, which had an international theatrical release on July 16, and was released in the United States and on demand on September 18 under the title No Escape. He speaks Russian in the film.

Rubinstein is the lead in Bret Easton Ellis's Smiley Face Killers, a thriller film based on true events that support the smiley face murder theory about an organized gang of serial killers committing murders of young, handsome athletic men throughout the United States. It was released in late 2020.

In 2021, Rubinstein joined the cast of Ryan Murphy's American Horror Stories for the fifth episode, starring alongside Billie Lourd.

In 2025, Rubinstein was announced as one of the main cast members of the Sony Television series S.W.A.T. Exiles.

=== Other work ===
Rubinstein stars in CeCe's music video for "Broke AF" (2017).

In 2018, he appeared as himself in the documentary Tyler Shields: Provocateur.

In January 2022, Rubinstein announced the release of the first single, "Open Door", by his band Nights in Stereo that he formed with Rodrigo R. Rodarte and Jon Shoer. In summer 2022, the band announced their second single, "Underwater". The songs are available on Spotify.

== Personal life ==
Rubinstein came out as bisexual in an interview with Variety in April 2021.

His first language is Russian, and Hebrew and English are his second and third languages, respectively.

The actor is an outdoor enthusiast. He has played basketball since he was a child and has named Kobe Bryant as his biggest idol, role model, and "the first American thing" he knew after moving to the United States from Israel.

He is a devout fan of Red Hot Chili Peppers, Kings of Leon, and has expressed his admiration for Harry Styles' work and his "own identity and the way he presents himself."

In March 2020, he endorsed Bernie Sanders in the Democratic presidential race.

He rescued and adopted two pit bulls, named Fresh and Spot.

In 2020, Rubinstein switched from pescetarianism to veganism.

Rubinstein explained his family's heritage: "We didn't grow up religious but my parents instilled pride in us in the traditions, the history and the culture of the Jewish people," he said. "We observe the holidays every year, but my parents are in New York and my sister is in Seattle so it's hard to get everyone together."

On August 14, 2022, he married Canadian actress Jessica Parker Kennedy in a small Jewish ceremony on a farm in Calgary Alberta, Canada, two months after their engagement in Portofino, Italy. They started dating in 2017. As of 2022, they reside together in Los Angeles, California. They welcomed their first child, Boydd Parker-Rubinstein, on September 29, 2024.

== Activism ==
=== Environmental activism ===
Rubinstein is a survivor of Hurricane Sandy, which led him to become a climate activist and sustainability advocate. In July 2020, he described that the hurricane caused devastation to his entire neighborhood in Staten Island, destroying his family's home and everything inside it. He has stated it was "the most horryfying moment" of his life. With nowhere to live, he stayed at a friend's house, and was provided with food and clothing from the Red Cross. The hurricane killed 24 of his neighbors.

Rubinstein, who was eighteen years old at that time, has stated that his acting career "will coincide with trying to save the planet". He made it his "mission" to raise awareness for the urgency of environmental issues, promoting sustainable living and using his platform and publicity to educate the public. He has garnered attention for his vintage and sustainable fashion choices, of which he has stated that he is trying to be "as eco-friendly as possible", and has praised Stella McCartney for recognizing the importance of sustainability in the fashion industry. He is an ambassador for Vrai, the world's only producer of carbon neutral, lab-grown diamonds.

He is an ambassador for The Ocean Cleanup, a non-profit engineering organization developing a giant C-shaped device to purge the world's oceans of plastic waste. He is also an ambassador for Project Zero, a global movement to protect and restore the ocean, and marched with protesters in the September 2019 climate strikes, the largest global climate protest in world history. He also has supported the Leonardo DiCaprio Foundation.

In April 2020, he was one of the environmental activists who participated in Earth Day Live, a three-day climate mobilization that was streamed online amid the COVID-19 pandemic. In his segment, he highlighted the importance of transitioning from fossil fuel to clean energy by switching to zero-emissions fuel cell electric vehicles, which run on hydrogen and emit only water and heat. He himself drives this type of zero-emissions cars as an ambassador for DriveH2, an initiative dedicated to promoting the transition to a clean transportation system.

In June 2022, Rubinstein became an official board member of the non-profit environmental organization Environmental Media Association.

On the 75th anniversary of the United Nations, Rubinstein co-launched Half the World, the United Nations Development Programme's campaign that aims to shed light on the increasing poverty and inequalities caused by COVID-19 and climate change.

=== Other activism and advocacy ===
In addition to sustainability advocacy, Rubinstein has lent his support to the National Fallen Firefighters Foundation, the No Kid Hungry campaign, the Black Lives Matter movement, Marsha P. Johnson Institute protecting the human rights of black transgender people, Feeding America, Mercy for Animals, the Humane Society, as well as Rebecca Corry's Stand Up for Pits Foundation, working on rescuing and ending the abuse of pit bull dogs.

During the COVID-19 pandemic lockdowns in March 2020, Rubinstein created a global charitable candle light initiative in support of the healthcare workers and first responders on the frontlines of the pandemic.

He participated in live reading adaptations of Shakespeare's Hamlet and Jane Austen's Pride & Prejudice to help raise funds for non-profit charities on Acting for a Cause, a live classic play and screenplay reading series, created, directed and produced by Brando Crawford during the 2020 pandemic.

In August 2020, Rubinstein teamed up with When We All Vote, Michelle Obama's non-partisan voter registration organization which aims to increase participation in elections.

He is a vocal advocate for LGBTQ rights.

== In the media ==
In 2020, Los Angeles included Rubinstein on the New Hollywood A-List, its list of the ten young Hollywood's most exceptional new talents.

== Discography ==
=== Singles ===
Title	Details	Credits
"Open Door"	Released: January 27, 2022	Lead vocals, lyricist
"Underwater"	Released June 3, 2022	Lead Vocals, lyricist
"New Love, New York"	Released June 11, 2025	Lead Vocal, lyricist

== Filmography ==
=== Film ===
Year	Title	Role	Notes
2011	Detachment	Gangsta	
2011	Katya	Insurgent 2	Short film
2012	A Promise Is a Promise	John	
2013	It Felt Like Love	Sammy	
2013	Something in the Way	James Manning	Writer, director, editor
2014	Jamie Marks Is Dead	Ronnie	
2015	Condemned	Dante	
2015	Some Kind of Hate	Lincoln Taggert	
2017	Smartass	Nick	
2017	West of Time	Son	Short film
2018	Dude	Mike	
2018	Tyler Shields: Provocateur	Himself	Documentary
2019	Brooklyn Love Stories	Benny	Anthology
2020	No Escape	Alexei Koslov	Also known as Follow Me
2020	Smiley Face Killers	Jake Graham	

=== Television ===
Year	Title	Role	Notes
2015	Orange Is the New Black	Nathan	Season 3
2016	Dead of Summer	Alex Powell	10 episodes
2020–2025	9-1-1: Lone Star	Tyler Kennedy "TK" Strand	Main role; 72 episodes
2021	American Horror Stories	Matt Webb	Episode: "BA'AL"
2026-present	S.W.A.T. Exiles	Jude Callan	Main role

=== Music videos ===
Year	Title	Role	Performer
2017	"Broke AF"	Boyfriend	CeCe
