= Smartass =

2017 drama film directed by Jena Serbu

- Directed by: Jena Serbu
- Written by: Jena Serbu
- Produced by: David Ryan; Hunter Ryan
- Starring: Joey King; Luke Pasqualino; Ronen Rubinstein
- Cinematography: Rob C. Givens
- Edited by: Phillip J. Bartell
- Music by: Raney Shockne
- Production companies: Lost Lodge Productions; Future Proof Films
- Distributed by: Gravitas Ventures
- Release date: September 12, 2017
- Running time: 90 minutes
- Country: United States
- Language: English

Smartass is a 2017 American crime drama film directed by Jena Serbu and starring Joey King. It was released on September 12, 2017.

== Plot ==
Based on mostly true events, a skateboarding teenage runaway, Freddie, befriends a drug dealer called Lobo as she navigates the Southern California criminal underworld.

== Cast ==
- Joey King as Freddie
- Luke Pasqualino as Donny
- Ronen Rubinstein as Nick
- Marc Menchaca as Rod
- Jake Weary as Mickey
- Helena Mattsson as Henna
- Yvette Nicole Brown as Officer Neesy
- Trevante Rhodes as Mike C
- Nicole LaLiberte as Chuchu
- Noel Gugliemi as Jose
- Emilio Rivera as Poco Efe
- Cara Santana as Venice
- Jahking Guillory as Kid K
- David Selby as Herman
- Vanessa Evigan as Bird
- D. C. Douglas as Dad
