= RAW artists =

Arts organization

RAW Artists (RAW:natural born artists) is an international arts organization that started in the United States and spread to Canada, Australia and other countries. It produces one-night events showcasing emerging local artists working in a variety of creative mediums.

== History ==
RAW was founded in 2009 by its CEO Heidi Luerra in Los Angeles, California. Within three years, RAW events were occurring in 60+ cities in the US. RAW also had locations in Australia, Canada, Mexico, and the UK.

In March 2025, Meghan Jones became the new CEO of RAW Artists.

== Business Model ==
RAW Artists produce single-night events in various cities in which independent artists from different creative categories in the first 10 years of their careers can showcase their work to their community, local business professionals and press. The creative categories include visual art, sculpture, painting, photography, technology, film, crafts, accessories, hair and makeup, fashion, performance art dance, body painting and music.

To cover costs of production and staff, artists were required to sell 20 tickets to the showcase, or pay the equivalent of unsold tickets themselves, or alternatively could postpone or opt out. RAW Artists earn $10 for every ticket they sell after the full 20 ticket commitment is fulfilled. Guests also paid an entrance fee. This business model has been criticised by some artists as requiring them to "pay to perform".

In each location, a showcase director identifies and recruits the artists and produces the full event. RAW also provides participating artists with a profile on the RAW website, professional photos and a video interview, to further support the marketing of their work.

As of 2021, all locations are now owned and operated by independent local creative entrepreneurs through the licensing program PLATFORM by RAW Artists™. These licensees choose their own artist value packages and parameters for participation.
