= Felippe Cioffi =

American musician

Felippe Cioffi was an American trombone soloist in the 19th century. He began a solo career in New York City and later moved to New Orleans and then to London, England.

"Cioffi appeared regularly at Niblo's Garden when he was in New York. In these settings [he] played arrangements of popular songs and operatic excerpts, among other lighter fare". By 1848 he was in London, playing as a member of Berlioz's orchestra at the Theatre Royal, Drury Lane, but he reputedly did not play the solo in the middle movement of the composer's Symphonie Funèbre et Triomphale because it was supremely taxing for the technique of the day.

Speaking of his earlier London performances, the British Musician and Orchestral Times in 1894 described Cioffi as "a marvelous player on the slide trombone. His silk hat was lined with newspaper cuttings relating to his performances, and he would sometimes give us a taste of his quality which would rather open our eyes." Louis Jullien employed Cioffi as a solo trombonist with his popular London dance orchestra, and Cioffi was professor at the Military Music Class at Kneller Hall, near London, from 1860 to 1866.
