= Holland Roden =

American actress (born 1986)

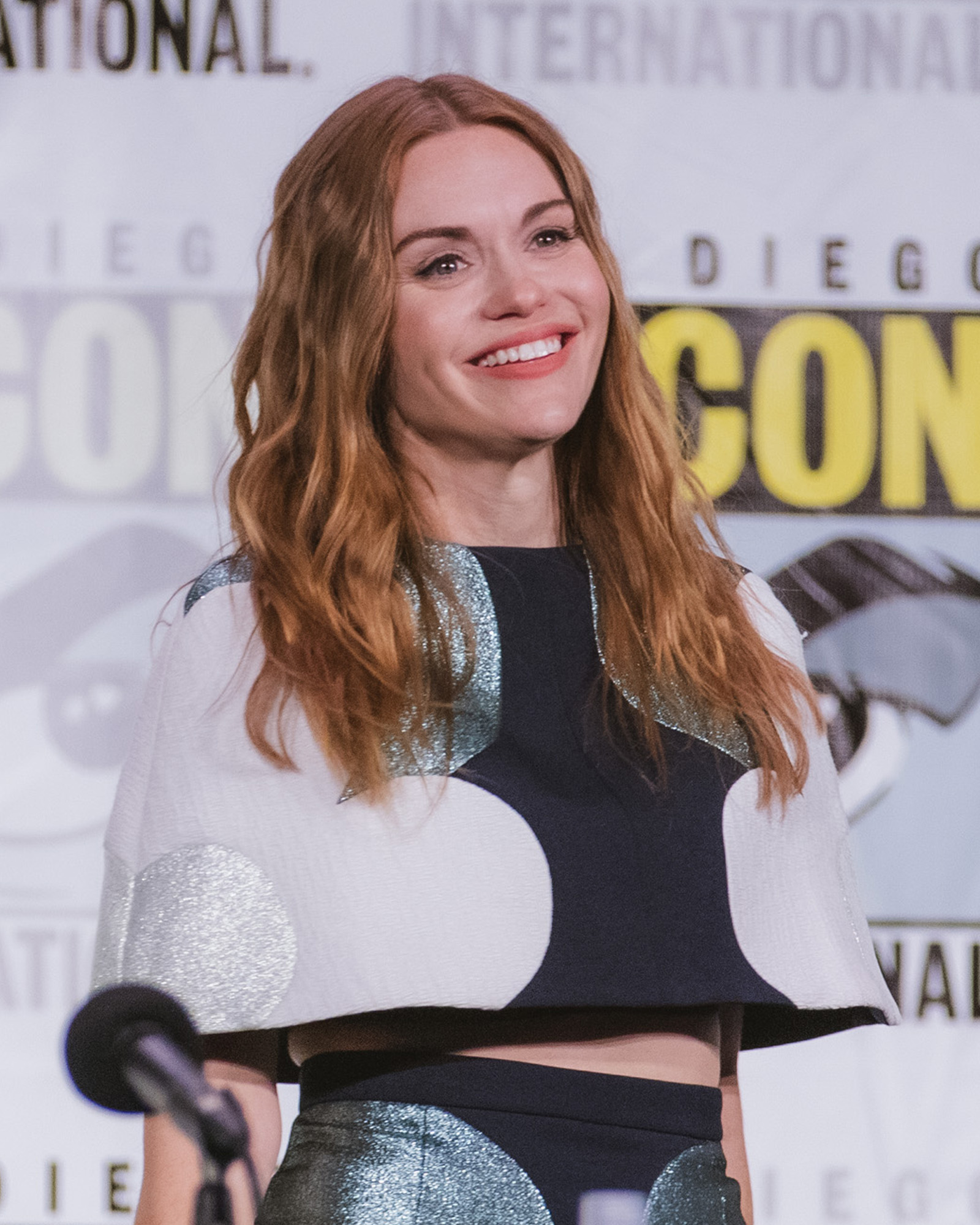
- Roden in 2025
- Born: October 7, 1986 (age 40); Dallas, Texas, U.S.
- Education: UCLA
- Occupation: Actress
- Years active: 2004–present
- Known for: Teen Wolf; Channel Zero: Butcher's Block; Lore

Holland Roden (born October 7, 1986) is an American actress. She is known for her roles as Lydia Martin in MTV's teen drama series Teen Wolf, Zoe Woods in Syfy's horror anthology series Channel Zero: Butcher's Block, Bridget Cleary in Amazon Prime Video's horror anthology documentary series Lore and as Erin Isaacs in the horror film No Escape.

== Early life ==
Roden was born in Dallas, Texas, where she attended Hockaday School, an all-girls private school. She came from a medical family and majored in molecular biology and women's studies at UCLA, and spent three and a half years in pre-medical education with a view to becoming a cardiothoracic surgeon before taking up acting full time.

== Career ==
Roden starred in the HBO comedy series 12 Miles of Bad Road playing Bronwyn. In 2008, she played Emily Locke in Lost and Sky in the film Bring It On: Fight to the Finish. Between 2008 and 2010, she appeared in guest roles on television series including CSI: Crime Scene Investigation, Cold Case, Weeds, Community, Grey's Anatomy, and Criminal Minds.

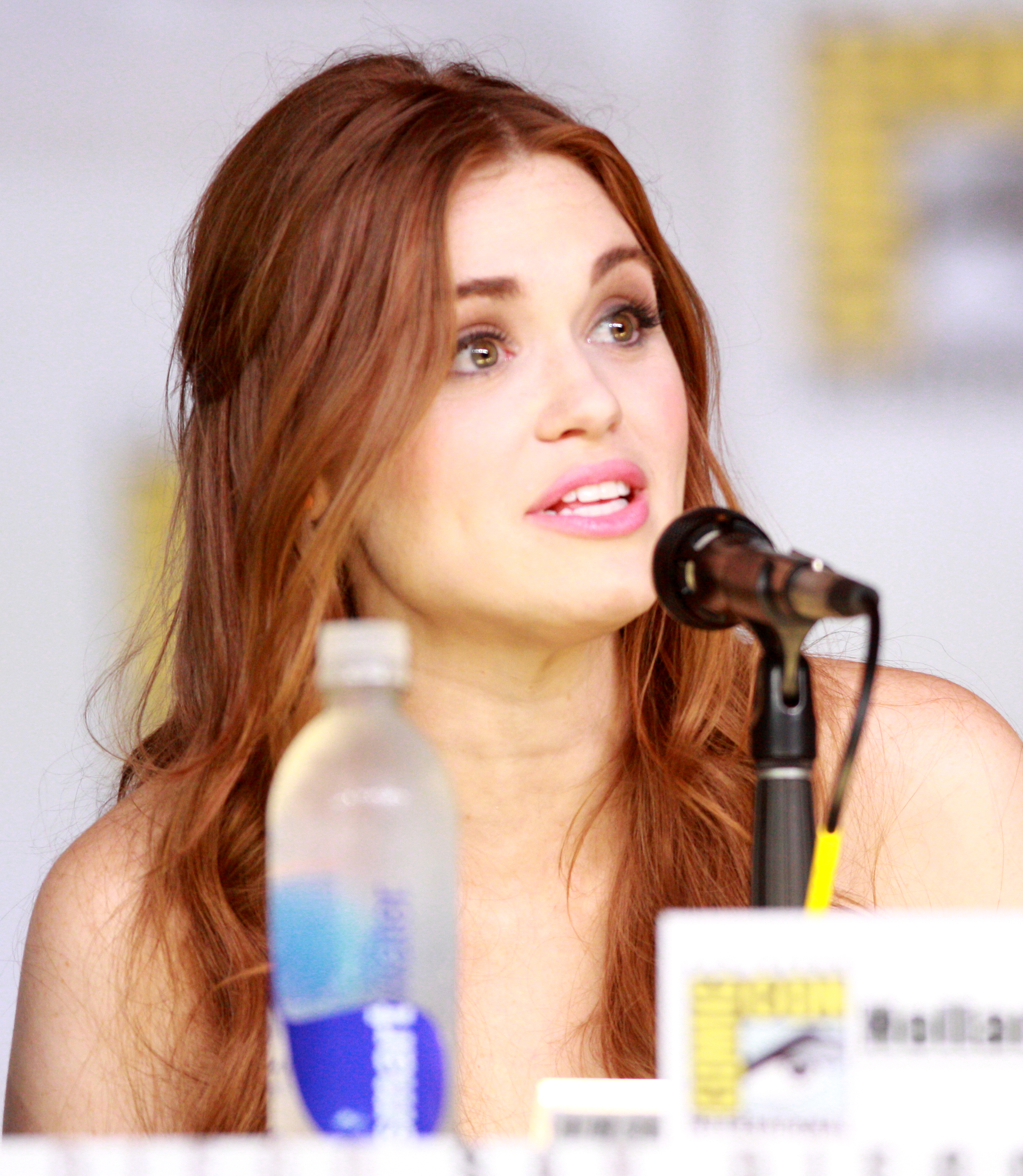
Roden at the 2013 San Diego Comic-Con

Beginning in 2011, Roden starred in the MTV teen supernatural drama Teen Wolf, where she played Lydia Martin, a popular, intelligent girl at Beacon Hills High School who eventually discovers that she possesses the supernatural abilities of a banshee. In 2016, it was announced at San Diego Comic-Con that Teen Wolf would end in 2017 after the completion of its sixth season. For her role as Lydia in the final season of Teen Wolf, she won a Teen Choice Award for Choice Summer TV Star: Female.

On May 25, 2017, Roden was cast as the lead in the third season of Syfy's horror anthology series Channel Zero, titled Butcher's Block. She portrayed Zoe Woods, a young woman who struggles with mental illness. The show premiered on February 7, 2018. On May 31, 2017, Roden was cast as the lead in the Amazon Prime Video horror anthology series Lore, in which she played the role of Bridget Cleary. Lore premiered on October 13, 2017.

On September 12, 2018, Roden was cast in horror film No Escape, which was directed, produced and written by Will Wernick; the film was released on September 18, 2020. In March 2019, Roden was cast as Sienna in Jane the Novela, a spin-off of Jane the Virgin. The spin-off was not picked up by the network. On October 18, 2019, Roden was cast in Escape Room: Tournament of Champions, the sequel to the 2019 psychological thriller film Escape Room; the sequel was released on July 16, 2021. On July 30, 2021, Roden appeared in the independent film The Re-Education of Molly Singer.

In September 2021, it was announced that a reunion film for Teen Wolf had been ordered by Paramount+, with Jeff Davis returning as a screenwriter and executive producer of the film. The majority of the original cast members, including Roden, were set to reprise their roles. The film was released on January 26, 2023.

== Personal life ==
On May 17, 2019, Roden was detained by Brazilian officers at the São Paulo–Congonhas Airport, in São Paulo, Brazil. Immigration officials denied her entry into the country on the grounds that she had an invalid Brazilian visa. Roden claimed to have been treated as a criminal, and that the authorities also denied food and water to her, despite her having presented a valid passport and visa. After about 24 hours of detention, she was allowed to enter the country. She criticized the rigorous way she was treated: "After two years of traveling to Brazil with this passport and this visa with no problems, to meet fans and make friends, I am taken aback by the accusations and the treatment that faced me from the Brazilian police today. I am shocked that this is the same Brazil I know and love."

== Filmography ==
=== Film ===
Year	Title	Role	Note
2009	Bring It On: Fight to the Finish	Skyler	Direct-to-video
2013	House of Dust	Gabby	
2013	Cry of Fear	Lydia	
2020	No Escape	Erin Isaacs	
2021	Escape Room: Tournament of Champions	Rachel Ellis	
2021	Ted Bundy: American Boogeyman	Kathleen McChesney	
2022	Obsessed to Death	Cassie Collins	
2023	Teen Wolf: The Movie	Lydia Martin	
2023	Mother, May I?	Anya	Also producer
2023	The Re-Education of Molly Singer	Trina	
TBA	Zipline	Eve	Post-production

=== Television ===
Year	Title	Role	Note
2007	CSI: Crime Scene Investigation	Kira Dellinger	Episode: "Goodbye and Good Luck"
2008	12 Miles of Bad Road	Bronwyn	Guest role; 3 episodes
2008	Lost	Young Emily Locke	Episode: "Cabin Fever"
2008	Cold Case	Missy Gallavan	Episode: "Roller Girl"
2009	Pushed	Sascha	Unknown episodes
2009	Weeds	Yogurt Peddler	Episode: "Wonderful Wonderful"; uncredited
2009	Community	Girl	Episode: "Environmental Science"
2010	Criminal Minds	Rebecca Daniels	Episode: "...A Thousand Words"
2010	The Event	Young Violet	Episode: "Loyalty"
2011	Memphis Beat	Jill Simon	Episode: "Lost"
2011–2017	Teen Wolf	Lydia Martin	Main role
2012	Grey's Anatomy	Gretchen Shaw	Episode: "This Magic Moment"
2014	Fashion Police	Herself	Episode 9.3
2015	Eat Me	Herself	Host, also executive producer; unaired television series
2017	Lore	Bridget Cleary	Episode: "Black Stockings"
2018	Channel Zero: Butcher's Block	Zoe Woods	Main role
2018	MacGyver	Eileen Brennan	Episode: "Revenge + Catacombs + Le Fantome"
2019	Jane the Novela	Sienna	Unaired television pilot
2021–2022	Mayans M.C.	Erin Thomas	Recurring role (season 3), guest role (season 4)
2022	Time for Him to Come Home for Christmas	Elizabeth Athens	Television film
2023	Making Waves	Amelia	Television film
2024	Tipline Mysteries: Dial 1 for Murder	Maddie Moore	Television film
2024	Five Gold Rings	Audrey Moss	Television film
2025	Holiday Touchdown: A Bills Love Story	Morgan Quinn	Television film

=== Music videos ===
Year	Title	Role	Artist
2009	"Burn"	Girl	Animals
2010	"Light, Lost"	The Abducted Girl	Seasons
2015	"Paper Moon"	The Girlfriend	Dutch Party
2015	"I Want to Feel Alive"	Young Woman	The Lighthouse and the Whaler

=== Podcast ===
Year	Title	Role	Notes
2022	Classified	Odessa / Klepto Carol	5 episodes
2023	Howler Back Now with Holland Roden	Herself / Host	16 episodes

== Awards and nominations ==
Year	Award	Category	Work	Result	Ref.
2013	Young Hollywood Awards	Best Ensemble (shared with Tyler Posey, Crystal Reed, Dylan O'Brien and Tyler Hoechlin)	Teen Wolf	Won	
2017	Teen Choice Awards	Choice Summer TV Actress	Teen Wolf	Won	
2017	Teen Choice Awards	Choice TV Ship (shared with Dylan O'Brien)	Teen Wolf	Nominated	
