= Sandy Cioffi =

American film and video artist

Sandy Cioffi is a Seattle-based film and video artist. She is director and producer of the documentary film Sweet Crude and has produced and/or directed the films Crocodile Tears, Terminal 187 and Just Us. She was a tenured professor in the Film and Video Communications Department at Seattle Central Community College.

Sandy has worked with human rights organizations in global hot zones before, during and after conflict. She first ventured into video production as a volunteer for Witness for Peace during the Contra War in Nicaragua. She traveled with students from the U.S. to film South Africa’s transition from Apartheid in 1995. She used film as a documentation and verification tool to provide video evidence regarding compliance with the Good Friday Peace Agreement during the 1998 Marching Season in Northern Ireland. Sandy has worked extensively with the Hate Free Zone in Seattle, producing films about treatment of immigrants after September 11. She was Seattle Director for the video documentation of the Immigrant Workers Freedom Ride in 2003.

== Filmography ==
- 1997: Terminal 187
- 1998: Crocodile Tears, producer
- 2003: And Justice For All, producer, director
- 2009: Sweet Crude, producer, director
