= List of awards and nominations received by Kristen Bell =

Kristen Bell awards and nominations
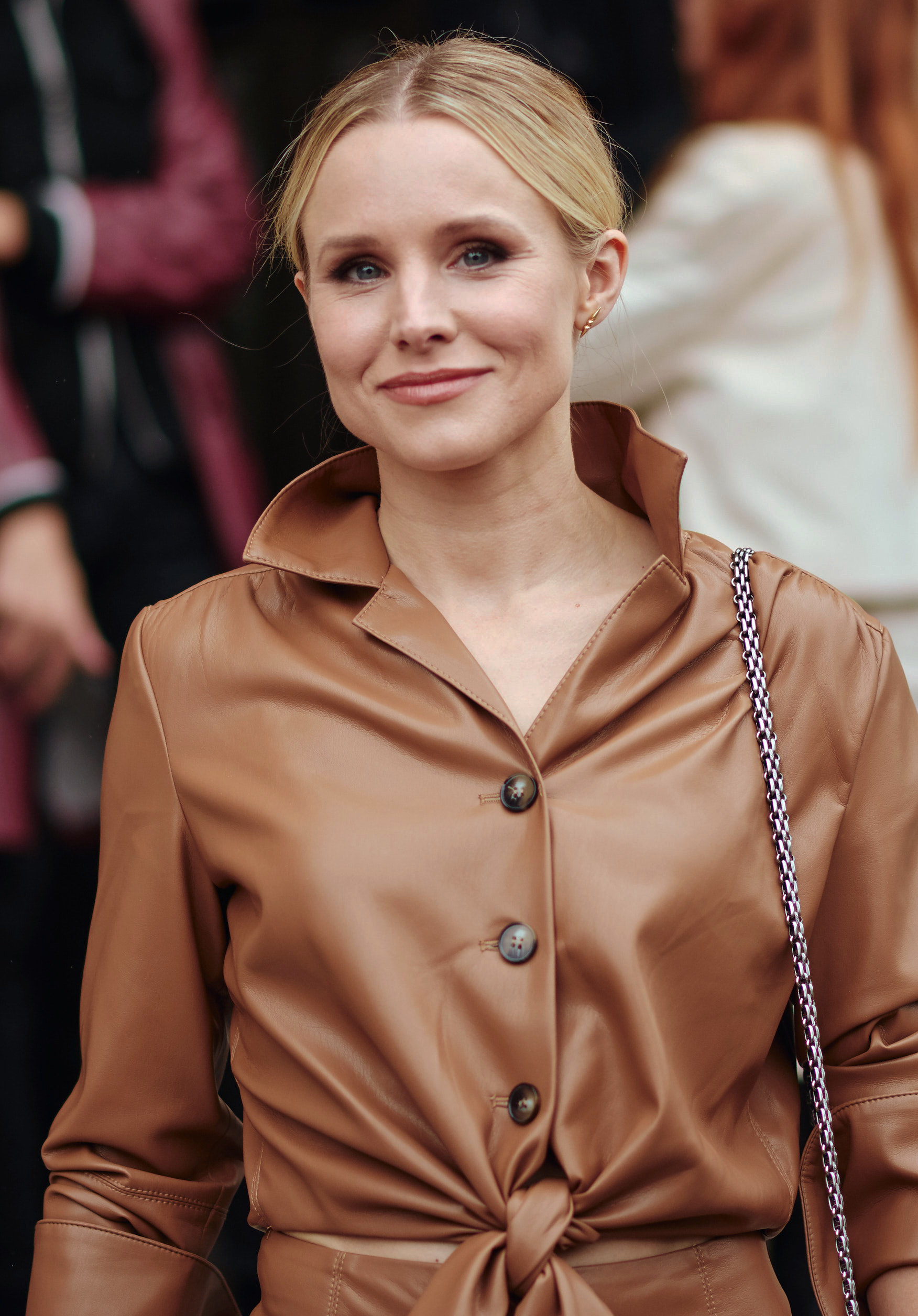
- Bell in 2020
Awards and nominations
Award	Wins	Nominations
Alliance of Women Film Journalists	1	2
Children's and Family Emmy Awards	2	3
Critics' Choice Movie Awards	1	1
Critics' Choice Television Awards	0	2
Gold Derby Awards	2	6
Golden Globe Awards	0	2
Gotham Awards	0	1
Hollywood Walk of Fame	1	1
MTV Movie Awards	0	1
Nickelodeon Kids' Choice Awards	0	3
People's Choice Awards	3	7
Satellite Awards	0	1
Saturn Awards	1	4
Scream Awards	0	1
Screen Actors Guild Awards	0	1
Streamy Awards	0	1
TCA Awards	0	2
Teen Choice Awards	0	6

Totals (Note: Certain award groups do not simply award one winner. They acknowledge several different recipients, have runners-up, and have third place. Since this is a specific recognition and is different from losing an award, runner-up mentions are considered wins in this award tally. For simplification and to avoid errors, each award in this list has been presumed to have had a prior nomination.)
- Wins: 11
- Nominations: 45

Kristen Bell is an American actress and producer in film and television. In her career, she received forty-three award nominations and won ten awards. Bell's first award nomination was for a Saturn Award for Best Actress on Television for her performance as the title character in the television series Veronica Mars in 2005. She won her first award at the Gold Derby Awards in the 'Drama Lead Actress' category the same year.

In 2016, Bell won a People's Choice Award for House of Lies. From 2016–2020, she starred in the lead role of Eleanor Shellstrop on the critically acclaimed NBC comedy series The Good Place (2016–2020), winning two more People's Choice Awards and receiving a Golden Globe Award nomination for her role. In 2019, she received a star on the Hollywood Walk of Fame. In 2024, Bell starred in the series Nobody Wants This and was nominated for a second time at the Golden Globes in addition to her first Primetime Emmy Award nomination for her role the following year.

Until 2025, Bell has never been nominated for a Primetime Emmy Awards, which Vanity Fair has described as a "snub". She has, however, been nominated for three Children's and Family Emmy Awards as a producer, winning in 2025 and 2026.

== Awards and nominations ==
Awards and nominations
Award	Year (Note: Year of the award ceremony)	Category	Role	Work	Result	Ref(s)
Alliance of Women Film Journalists	2013	Best Animated Female	Anna	Frozen	Won	
Alliance of Women Film Journalists	2020	Best Animated Female	Anna	Frozen 2	Nominated	
Children's and Family Emmy Awards	2024	Outstanding Preschool Animated Series	Executive Producer	The Tiny Chef Show	Nominated	
Children's and Family Emmy Awards	2025	Outstanding Preschool Animated Series	Executive Producer	The Tiny Chef Show	Won	
Children's and Family Emmy Awards	2026	Outstanding Preschool Animated Series	Executive Producer	The Tiny Chef Show	Won	
Critics' Choice Movie Awards	2020	#SeeHer Award	—N/a	Filmography	Won	
Critics' Choice Television Awards	2018	Best Actress in a Comedy Series	Eleanor Shellstrop	The Good Place	Nominated	
Critics' Choice Television Awards	2025	Best Actress in a Comedy Series	Joanne	Nobody Wants This	Nominated	
Daytime Emmy Awards	2019	Outstanding Special Class Short Format Daytime	Herself	Momsplaining with Kristen Bell	Nominated	
Gold Derby Awards	2005	Drama Lead Actress	Veronica Mars	Veronica Mars	Won	
Gold Derby Awards	2005	Breakthrough Performer of the Year	—N/a	Filmography	Nominated	
Gold Derby Awards	2006	Drama Lead Actress	Veronica Mars	Veronica Mars	Won	
Gold Derby Awards	2018	Comedy Actress	Eleanor Shellstrop	The Good Place	Nominated	
Gold Derby Awards	2018	Ensemble of the Year	Eleanor Shellstrop	The Good Place	Nominated	
Gold Derby Awards	2019	Comedy Actress of the Decade	Eleanor Shellstrop	The Good Place	Nominated	
Golden Globe Awards	2019	Best Actress – Television Series Musical or Comedy	Eleanor Shellstrop	The Good Place	Nominated	
Golden Globe Awards	2025	Best Actress – Television Series Musical or Comedy	Joanne	Nobody Wants This	Nominated	
Gotham Awards	2012	Best Ensemble Performance	Belinda	Safety Not Guaranteed	Nominated	
Hollywood Walk of Fame	2019	Motion picture star	—N/a	Filmography	Inducted	
MTV Movie Awards	2009	Best WTF Moment (shared with Jason Segel)	Sarah Marshall	Forgetting Sarah Marshall	Nominated	
Nickelodeon Kids' Choice Awards	2019	Favorite Female Voice from an Animated Movie	Jade Wilson	Teen Titans Go! To the Movies	Nominated	
Nickelodeon Kids' Choice Awards	2020	Favorite Female Voice from an Animated Movie	Anna	Frozen 2	Nominated	
Nickelodeon Kids' Choice Awards	2024	Favorite Female Voice from an Animated Movie	Janet	Paw Patrol: The Mighty Movie	Nominated	
People's Choice Awards	2015	Favorite Cable TV Actress	Jeannie van der Hooven	House of Lies	Nominated	
People's Choice Awards	2016	Favorite Premium Cable TV Actress	Jeannie van der Hooven	House of Lies	Won	
People's Choice Awards	2017	Favorite Comedic Movie Actress	Kiki Moore & Claire Rawlings	Bad Moms & The Boss	Nominated	
People's Choice Awards	2017	Favorite Actress in a New TV Series	Eleanor Shellstrop	The Good Place	Won	
People's Choice Awards	2018	Comedy TV Star of 2018	Eleanor Shellstrop	The Good Place	Nominated	
People's Choice Awards	2019	Comedy TV Star of 2019	Eleanor Shellstrop	The Good Place	Won	
People's Choice Awards	2020	Comedy TV Star of the Year	Eleanor Shellstrop	The Good Place	Nominated	
Primetime Emmy Awards	2025	Outstanding Lead Actress in a Comedy Series	Joanne	Nobody Wants This	Nominated	
Primetime Emmy Awards	2025	Outstanding Comedy Series	Executive Producer	Nobody Wants This	Nominated	
Primetime Emmy Awards	2026	Outstanding Comedy Series	Executive Producer	Nobody Wants This	Nominated	
Satellite Awards	2005	Outstanding Actress in a Series, Drama	Veronica Mars	Veronica Mars	Nominated	
Saturn Awards	2005	Best Actress on Television	Veronica Mars	Veronica Mars	Nominated	
Saturn Awards	2006	Best Actress on Television	Veronica Mars	Veronica Mars	Won	
Saturn Awards	2007	Best Actress on Television	Veronica Mars	Veronica Mars	Nominated	
Saturn Awards	2009	Best Guest Starring Role in a Television Series	Elle Bishop	Heroes	Nominated	
Scream Awards	2011	Best Cameo (shared with Anna Paquin)	Chloe Patterson	Scream 4	Nominated	
Screen Actors Guild Awards	2025 (Note: Bell hosted the ceremony.)	Outstanding Performance by a Female Actor in a Comedy Series	Joanne	Nobody Wants This	Nominated	
Streamy Awards	2013	Best Female Performance: Comedy	Mandy	Burning Love	Nominated	
TCA Awards	2005	Individual Achievement in Drama	Veronica Mars	Veronica Mars	Nominated	
TCA Awards	2017	Individual Achievement in Comedy	Eleanor Shellstrop	The Good Place	Nominated	
Teen Choice Awards	2008	Choice Movie Actress: Comedy	Sarah Marshall	Forgetting Sarah Marshall	Nominated	
Teen Choice Awards	2008	Choice Movie Breakout Female	Sarah Marshall	Forgetting Sarah Marshall	Nominated	
Teen Choice Awards	2009	Choice TV Actress: Action/Adventure	Elle Bishop	Heroes	Nominated	
Teen Choice Awards	2010	Choice Movie Actress: Romantic Comedy	Beth	When in Rome	Nominated	
Teen Choice Awards	2010	Choice Movie Actress: Comedy	Cynthia	Couples Retreat	Nominated	
Teen Choice Awards	2014	Choice Movie Actress: Drama	Veronica Mars	Veronica Mars	Nominated	
