= Kristen Bell =

American actress (born 1980)

- Bell in 2026
- Born: Kristen Anne Bell; July 18, 1980 (age 46); Huntington Woods, Michigan, U.S.
- Occupations: Actress; singer
- Years active: 1992–present
- Works: Full list
- Spouse: Dax Shepard (m. 2013)
- Children: 2
- Awards: Full list

Kristen Anne Bell (born July 18, 1980) is an American actress and singer. Her work includes both film and television, and her accolades include two Emmy Awards nominations, in addition to nominations for three Golden Globe Awards. In 2025, Time included her in their selection of the 100 most influential people in the world.

Bell began her acting career starring in stage productions, while attending the Tisch School of the Arts at New York University. She made her Broadway stage debut as Becky Thatcher in the comedy musical The Adventures of Tom Sawyer (2001) and appeared in a Broadway revival of The Crucible (2002). She then appeared in the action film Spartan and received praise for her performance in the television drama film Gracie's Choice (both 2004).

Bell had her breakout performance as the title character in the television series Veronica Mars (2004–2007), a role she reprised in the 2014 spin-off film and the 2019 revival. She also starred as Elle Bishop in the superhero drama series Heroes (2007–2008), voiced the titular narrator in the teen drama series Gossip Girl (2007–2012) and its 2021 standalone sequel, and starred in the comedy series House of Lies (2012–2016). She received nominations for the Golden Globe Award for Best Actress - Television Series Musical or Comedy for her leading roles in the comedy series The Good Place (2016–2020) and the romantic comedy series Nobody Wants This (2024); the latter also earned her two Primetime Emmy Awards nominations, for Outstanding Lead Actress in a Comedy Series and Outstanding Comedy Series.

During her time on Veronica Mars, Bell starred in the television musical film Reefer Madness: The Movie Musical (2005) and the horror film Pulse (2006). She has since appeared in a number of comedy films, including Forgetting Sarah Marshall (2008), Couples Retreat (2009), When in Rome (2010), You Again (2010), Burlesque (2010), Safety Not Guaranteed (2012), Stuck in Love (2012), The Lifeguard (2013), The Boss (2016), Bad Moms (2016), A Bad Moms Christmas (2017), How to Be a Latin Lover (2017), CHiPs (2017), Like Father (2018), Queenpins (2021), The People We Hate at the Wedding (2022), and Paw Patrol: The Mighty Movie (2023). She received further recognition for voicing Princess Anna in the Disney animated films Frozen (2013) and Frozen 2 (2019). She is also the voice of Amy Rose in the upcoming Sonic the Hedgehog 4.

== Early life and education ==
Kristen Anne Bell was born on July 18, 1980, in Huntington Woods, a suburb of Detroit. Her mother, Lorelei Jo (née Frygier), was a registered nurse, and her father, Thomas Michael "Tom" Bell, was a television news director.

Kristen described her mother as "very religious," which put a strain on their relationship. Her mother is of Polish descent, and her father has German, Scottish, and Irish ancestry. Her parents divorced when she was six months old; both have remarried, and Bell has two half-sisters from her father's second marriage and four step-siblings from her mother's second marriage.

At the age of four, Bell said she did not like her first name, so her mother encouraged her to use her middle name, Anne, which she continued to use until high school. Just before her first year of high school, Bell's parents removed her from the public school system. She attended Shrine Catholic High School in nearby Royal Oak, where she participated in the drama and music clubs.

Before Shrine Catholic, she was a student at Burton Elementary School in Huntington Woods. At Shrine, she won the starring role in the school's 1997 production of The Wizard of Oz as Dorothy Gale and appeared in productions of Fiddler on the Roof (1995), Lady, Be Good (1996), and Li'l Abner (1998). In 1998, the year she graduated, she was named the yearbook's "Best Looking Lil' Lady" via a senior class vote.

Shortly after high school, Bell moved to Manhattan to attend New York University's Tisch School of the Arts, studying musical theatre. She left about six credits shy of graduating to play a role in a Broadway musical, saying in an interview with iVillage, "You get to the point where you don't need a degree to be an actor."

== Career ==
=== 1992–2003: Early work ===
In 1992, Bell went to her first audition and won a dual role as a banana and a tree in a suburban Detroit theater's production of Raggedy Ann and Andy. Her mother had established her with an agent before Bell was 13, which allowed her to appear in newspaper advertisements for several Detroit retailers and television commercials. She began private acting lessons. In 1998, she had an uncredited role in the film Polish Wedding. In 2001, Bell left New York University to play Becky Thatcher in the short-lived Broadway musical of The Adventures of Tom Sawyer. That year, she made her credited film debut in Pootie Tang. Her single line of dialogue was cut, and she appears only during the credits.

In 2002, she appeared in the Broadway revival of The Crucible with Liam Neeson, Angela Bettis and Laura Linney. Bell moved to Los Angeles in 2002 because of her friendship with writers Kevin Murphy and Dan Studney, and appeared in a handful of television shows as a special guest, finding trouble gaining a recurring role in a television series. Bell said she "tested like eight times and booked nothing and every show [she] tested for got picked up", including auditions for Skin and what she called "that Norm Macdonald show". In 2003, Bell appeared in television shows such as FX's The Shield and The WB's Everwood, and also co-starred in the film The King and Queen of Moonlight Bay as Alison, a 17-year-old girl who travels to Arizona to reconnect with the father who abandoned her family.

=== 2004–2006: Veronica Mars and other roles ===
In 2004, Bell earned acclaim for her starring role in the Lifetime television film Gracie's Choice, which received one of the network's highest ratings. She made her debut in a theatrically released film with David Mamet's action thriller Spartan, as Laura Newton, the kidnapped daughter of the U.S. president, acting alongside Val Kilmer. Bell guest-starred on the HBO period drama series Deadwood, in a two-episode story arc ("Bullock Returns to the Camp" and "Suffer the Little Children").

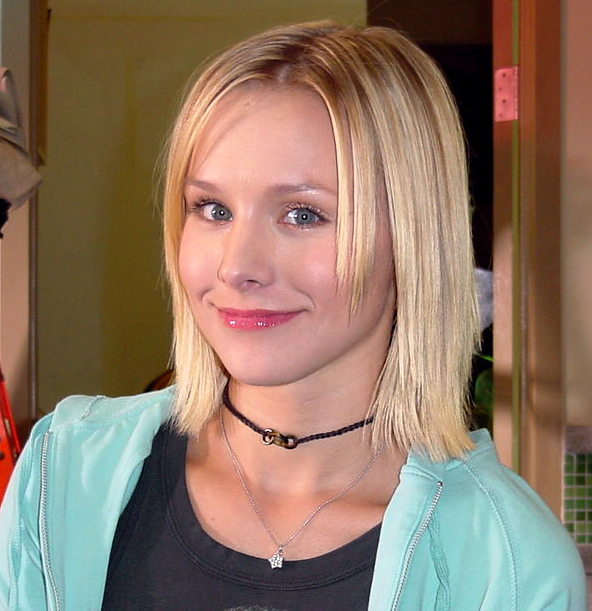
Bell on the set of Veronica Mars in 2004

At 24, she won the role of the title character in the UPN noir drama series Veronica Mars, which was launched in the fall of 2004. Created by Rob Thomas, the series starred Bell as the seventeen-year-old anti-establishment high school student and private detective. Bell drew on the parallels between the character of Veronica and her own life, since Bell's parents had divorced and her best friend had also died. The series earned acclaim from critics. Bell's performance earned her the Saturn Award for Best Actress on Television and a nomination for the TCA Award for Individual Achievement in Drama, among numerous others. Some critics asserted that her performance was overlooked, and deserved consideration for an Emmy nomination.

Aside from working on Veronica Mars, Bell starred in Reefer Madness: The Movie Musical, reprising the role she played in the short-lived 2001 Off-Broadway musical. The musical was a spoof of Reefer Madness, the 1936 exploitation film. The film debuted on the Showtime on April 16, 2005. Also in April, Bell starred as Gracie in Fifty Pills, an entry for the Tribeca Film Festival. She appeared in a short independent film called The Receipt and the horror film Roman, which was directed by her Crucible co-star Bettis. Released on August 11, 2006, Pulse starred Bell as the lead Mattie. A remake of the Japanese horror film Kairo, the film grossed US$27.9 million worldwide but garnered negative response from critics. Frank Scheck of The Hollywood Reporter commented, "despite the starring presence of Kristen Bell, [the] young actress has far less interesting material to work with here than she does as [the character] 'Veronica Mars.'"

=== 2007–2011: Film breakthrough and Gossip Girl ===
Veronica Mars continued on UPN for a second season; for the third season, the show was renewed and appeared on the newly created The CW. On January 19, 2007, CW Entertainment President Dawn Ostroff announced that while she was pleased with the gradual improvement of Veronica Mars's ratings, the series would be put on hiatus after February sweeps to air a new reality series, Pussycat Dolls Present: The Search for the Next Doll. On May 17, 2007, Ostroff announced the cancelation of the series. A two-hour series finale aired in the United States on May 22, 2007, and on June 11, 2007, Thomas officially announced in an email to TV Guide's Michael Ausiello that Veronica Mars had been canceled by The CW. A Veronica Mars feature film and comic book series continuation had been discussed, and for a short time there was talk of another collaboration between Bell and creator Thomas that would be unrelated to the Veronica Mars series.

Following the cancellation of Veronica Mars, Bell voiced interest in appearing on NBC's superhero drama series Heroes because she was a fan of the show. On July 29, 2007, during a train ride back to Los Angeles from San Diego Comic-Con with Heroes actors Zachary Quinto and Masi Oka, and writers from the series, the writers had mentioned that if she "ever want[ed] to come on Heroes, give us [writers] a call," to which Bell said she would "love to". Meanwhile, there were also discussions about a role on Lost, but Bell turned down the role of Charlotte Staples Lewis. Bell finally signed on to appear in Heroes, portrayed the character of Elle Bishop, a "mysterious young lady" with an "awesome power". She did not have to do audition for the role of Elle, who made her first appearance in an October 2007 episode, and appeared in twelve episodes during the run of the series. The casting of Bell, Heroes creator Tim Kring explained, "was not easy to pull off", but because of the large ensemble cast of the series and multiple story arcs, "we found a way to jump into a small window in [Bell's] schedule." Bell also lent her voice to another The CW series Gossip Girl; she voiced the titular character in every episode of the series, appearing in person only for a surprise cameo in the final episode, portraying herself.

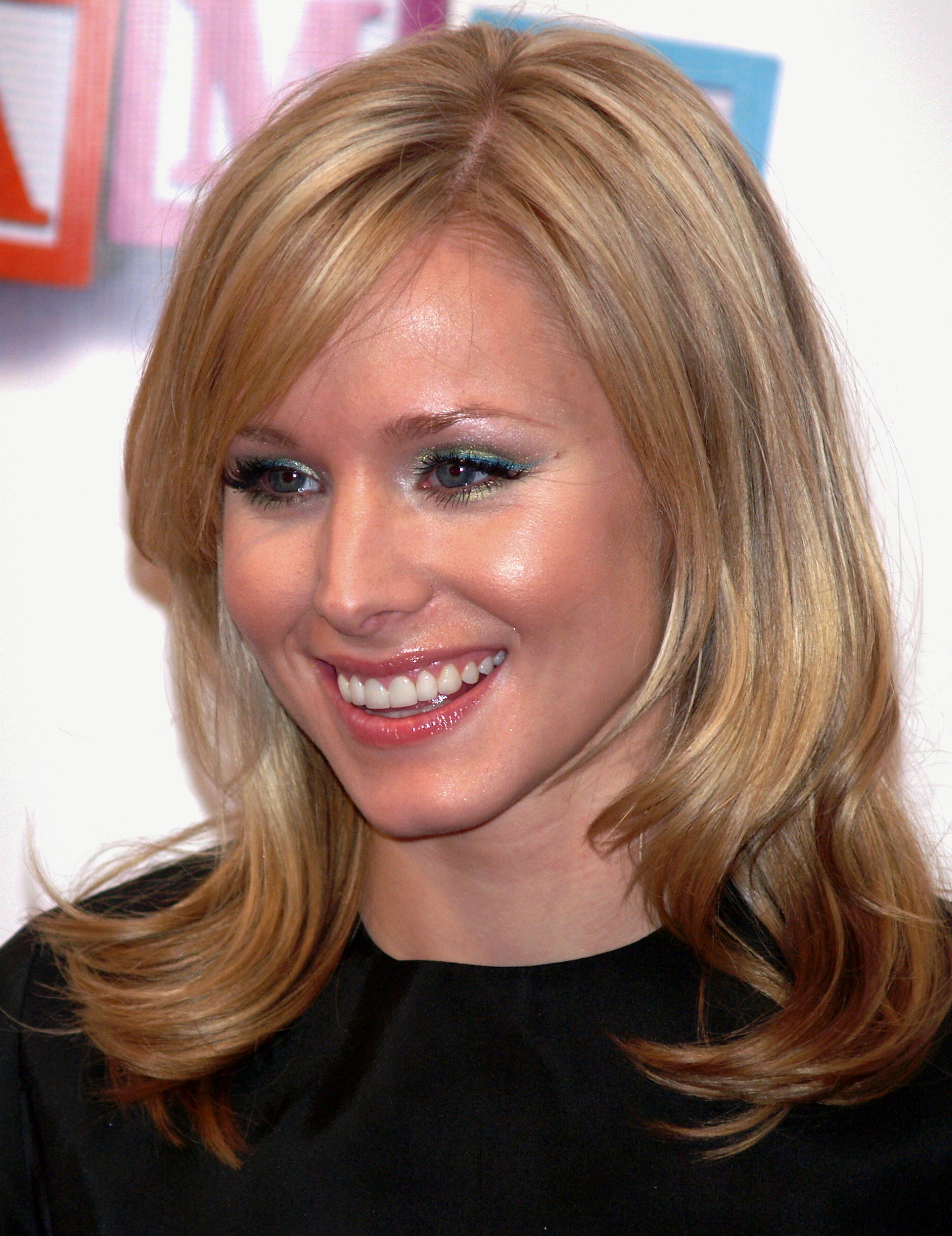
Bell at the 2008 Tribeca Film Festival

Shortly after the cancelation of Veronica Mars in early 2007, Bell filmed on location in Hawaii for a starring role as the title character in the Judd Apatow comedy Forgetting Sarah Marshall. She regarded the improvisational comedy in the film as "a lovely experience". The film, written by and also starring Jason Segel, was released theatrically on April 18, 2008, and greatly increased Bell's profile. Bell also lent her voice and likeness to the video game Assassin's Creed, which was released in November 2007 for consoles and April 2008 for the PC. Bell reprised her role of Lucy in Assassin's Creed II, released in November 2009, and again in Assassin's Creed: Brotherhood, released in November 2010. In the spring of 2006, she finished filming the Star Wars-themed comedy Fanboys. Director Kyle Newman received additional funding to shoot new scenes, but the busy schedules of the actors only allowed for filming in September 2007. As a result, the release was delayed until January 14, 2008. Bell starred in the 2009 comedies Serious Moonlight alongside Meg Ryan, and Couples Retreat which chronicles four couples who partake in therapy sessions at a tropical island resort, with Jason Bateman played her husband. She provided the voice for Cora in Astro Boy. On March 31, 2008, Bell began shooting the Mark Steven Johnson-directed film When in Rome on location in Rome and New York with Josh Duhamel; the film was released in 2010. Bell reprised her role as Sarah Marshall for a cameo appearance in the film Get Him to the Greek, a spin-off sequel from Forgetting Sarah Marshall, released June 4, 2010.

Bell co-starred alongside singers Christina Aguilera and Cher in the backstage musical film Burlesque, which was released in November 2010. She had a cameo appearance alongside Anna Paquin in the slasher horror film Scream 4, which was released on April 15, 2011.

=== 2012–2019: Frozen and The Good Place ===
In 2012, Bell starred in the family drama film Big Miracle. She appeared in the music video for "Madder Red" by Brooklyn experimental rock band Yeasayer. Bell portrayed Mary Magdalene in The Truth & Life Dramatized Audio New Testament Bible, a 22-hour, celebrity-voiced, dramatized audio adaptation of the New Testament that uses the RSV-CE translation.

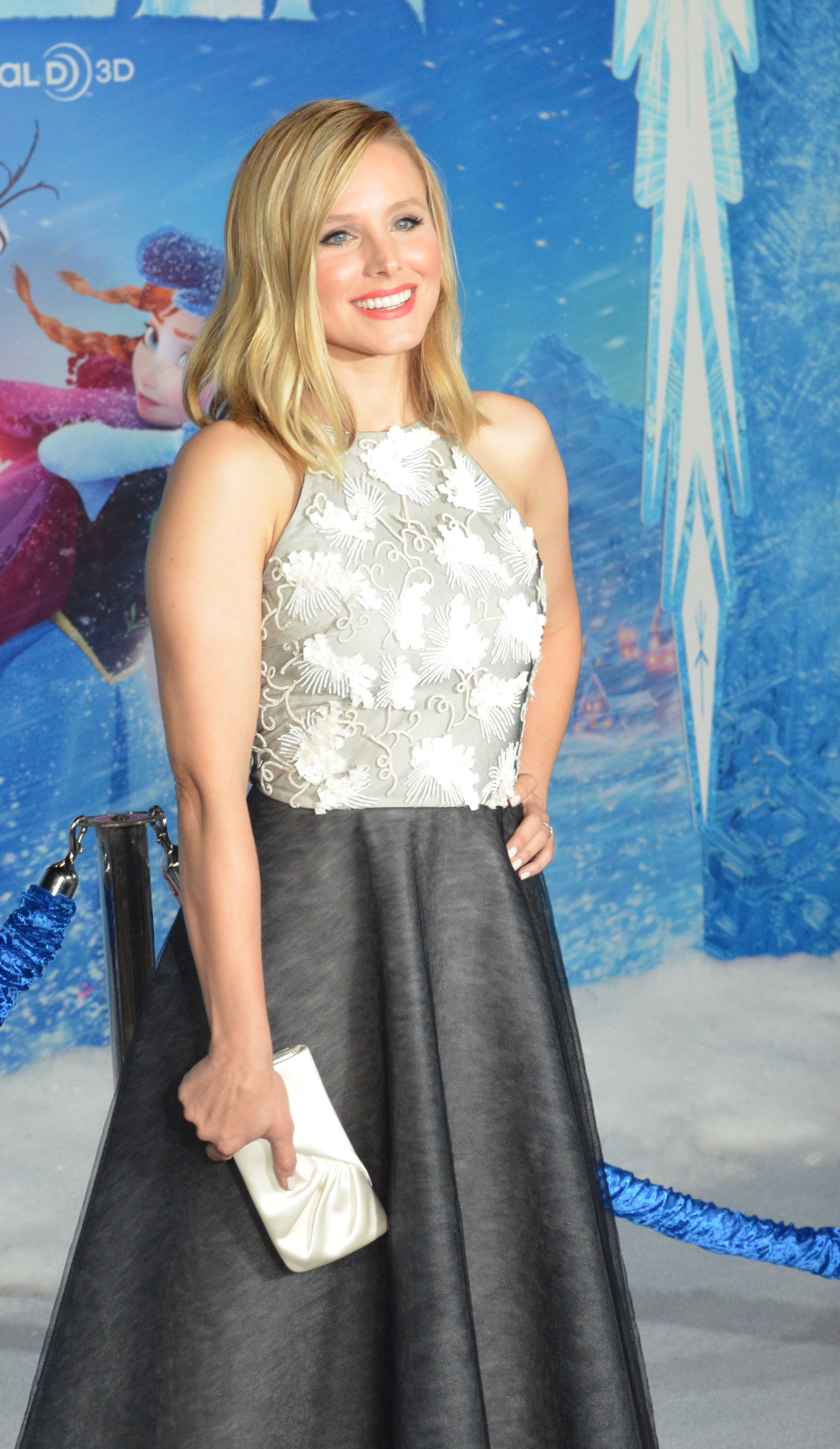
Bell at the premiere of Frozen in 2013 at the El Capitan Theatre

Bell starred as Jeannie van der Hooven, the female lead on the Showtime comedy-drama series House of Lies, which premiered on January 8, 2012. The series ended on June 12, 2016. Bell appeared in a supporting role in the science-fiction comedy Safety Not Guaranteed (2012) and also starred in the drama film The Lifeguard. Written and directed by Liz W. Garcia, it began filming in July 2012 and was released in August 2013. She voiced Anna in Frozen, which was released on November 27, 2013. In 2013, for multiple episodes, Bell played Ingrid de Forest, an Eagleton City Councilwoman, on NBC's Parks and Recreation.

On March 13, 2013, it was confirmed that a Veronica Mars film would be coming to fruition. Bell and series creator Thomas launched a fundraising campaign to produce the film through Kickstarter and attained the $2 million goal in less than ten hours. The main cast members of the series all reprised their roles in the feature film. Production of the film took place during summer 2013, and it was released theatrically and on video-on-demand on March 14, 2014. In September 2014, Bell starred with her husband Dax Shepard in a commercial for the Samsung Galaxy Tab S. It was so popular (with over 20 million YouTube views) that they did another for the holiday season. The ad agency McKinney was behind both.

In 2016, Bell voiced the sloth Priscilla in the animated comedy film Zootopia (reuniting her with Bateman), starred as Claire in the comedy film The Boss, and also co-led the R-rated comedy film Bad Moms as Kiki, a role she reprised in the 2017 sequel, A Bad Moms Christmas. (Both film also featured Mila Kunis and Kathryn Hahn in lead roles alongside Bell). In 2016, Bell began starring as Eleanor Shellstrop in the NBC comedy series The Good Place alongside Ted Danson. For her performance, she received a nomination for the Golden Globe Award for Best Actress – Television Series Musical or Comedy, the TCA Award for Individual Achievement in Comedy, and the Critics' Choice Television Award for Best Actress in a Comedy Series.

In 2017, Bell appeared in the biographical comedy-drama The Disaster Artist, the action comedy CHiPs (with her husband Shepard), and the comedy How to Be a Latin Lover. Also in November of the same year, she played a housewife (with Shepard again as her husband) preparing for a Christmas party in Sia's music video for "Santa's Coming for Us". In 2018, she began hosting the web series Momsplaining with Kristen Bell, with episodes airing on the Ellen DeGeneres video platform Ellentube. In the series, Bell gives new and expecting mothers tips about motherhood. The title of the series is a pun on the commonly used term "mansplaining". Bell later had the leading role in the Netflix comedy-drama film Like Father. She voiced the character of Jade Wilson in the animated comedy film Teen Titans Go! To the Movies and reprised her voice role as Princess Anna in the animated comedy sequel film Ralph Breaks the Internet.

On September 20, 2018, Hulu confirmed that Bell would reprise her role of Veronica Mars in an eight-episode fourth season of the drama series Veronica Mars, which would premiere in July 2019. In 2019, she again reprised her role of Princess Anna in the video game Kingdom Hearts III and the sequel Frozen 2 which was released on November 22, 2019. Bell served as host and executive producer on the Disney+ docuseries Encore!, which premiered in November 2019. She made her directorial debut with the eighth episode of the fourth season of The Good Place. The series concluded after its fourth season, airing its final episode in January 2020. At the 25th Critics' Choice Awards, Bell received the #SeeHer Award, which recognizes women who "push boundaries on changing stereotypes and acknowledge the importance of authentic portrayals of women across the entertainment landscape".

=== 2020–present ===
In 2020, Bell published the children's book The World Needs More Purple People, which she co-wrote with Benjamin Hart. Also in 2020, Bell voiced Molly Tillerman in the Apple TV+ animated musical comedy series Central Park, which reunited her with Frozen co-star Josh Gad and Bad Moms co-star Hahn. Central Park received a two-season order from Apple and the series premiered on May 29, 2020. In June 2020, it was announced that Bell, who is white, would no longer voice the biracial character of Molly. The role would be re-cast with a black or mixed race actress, with Bell voicing a new role.

In 2021, Bell produced and voiced a lead character in the Amazon Prime Video animated musical pre-school series Do, Re, & Mi. She returned to narrate as the titular character of the HBO Max teen drama series Gossip Girl, a soft reboot and sequel to the 2007–2012 series Gossip Girl. Bell starred alongside Kirby Howell-Baptiste as a pair of housewives who created a multi-million dollar coupon scam in the comedy film Queenpins. The film was released to Paramount+ on September 10, 2021. Her miniseries The Woman in the House Across the Street from the Girl in the Window was released on Netflix in January 2022. In November 2022, Bell starred in the Prime Video movie The People We Hate at the Wedding. Bell appeared in three episodes of The Tiny Chef Show and also serves as the show's executive producer.

Bell played the main character, an agnostic sex podcaster by the name of Joanne, in Netflix's Nobody Wants This (2024). Her performance earned her another Golden Globe nomination for Best Actress in a Musical or Comedy series as well her first nominations for Primetime Emmy Awards in her career for Outstanding Lead Actress in a Comedy Series and Outstanding Comedy Series as series executive producer.

In February 2026, Bell was announced to have been cast as the voice of Amy Rose in the upcoming live-action/animated film Sonic the Hedgehog 4.

== Public image ==
In 2006 and again in 2013, Bell was selected "World's Sexiest Vegetarian" on PETA's yearly poll. She was placed 68 on Maxim's 2005 "Hot 100" list, 11 in Maxim's 2006 "Hot 100" list, and 46 in Maxim's 2007 "Hot 100" list in which she was stated to have "single-handedly saved The CW from becoming the worst network ever". In 2006, Maxim also placed Bell at the top of the "Fall TV's Criminally Sexy Investigators" List. In 2008, she was ranked 59 on AskMen's Top 99 Women of 2008 List. Reflecting on her admitted popularity with "geeks", Bell was voted the fourth-sexiest woman on TV by the staff at Wizard magazine.

Bell stated she never thought of herself as womanly because "I always play and look and act 10 years younger than I am." However, she said, "Something magical happened when I turned 25 — I looked in the mirror and was like, 'You might not get carded for an R-rated movie anymore.' Like I didn't have a little stick figure anymore." Bell has said that many of her characters are tomboys because she was "not homely enough to play the nerdy girl and not nearly pretty enough to play the pretty girl".

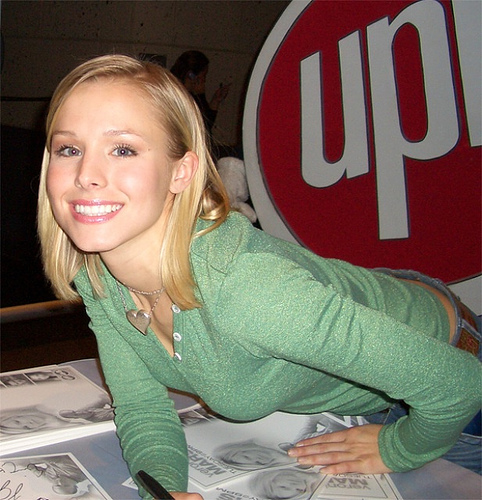
Bell signing autographs in 2006 at the Metreon in San Francisco

Bell has been associated with the idea that "nerdy is the new cool", and she explained, "what was previously perceived as nerdy is now viewed as original. What I like about nerdiness, geekiness, is it doesn't really matter what you're into—it just means you're not a follower." She has also said, "I love nerds. Comic-Con junkies are the tastemakers of tomorrow. Isn't that funny? The tables have turned." Vanessa Juarez of Entertainment Weekly commented that Bell's roles on Veronica Mars, Heroes and as a Star Wars fanatic in Fanboys have "solidif[ied] her placement at the center of the geek universe," while Rodney Rothman stated, "I guess she's cornered the market on losers." Bell's work is often compared to Sarah Michelle Gellar's portrayal of the title character on the television series Buffy the Vampire Slayer. Frank Scheck of The Hollywood Reporter stated that Bell was "arguably the television successor [to Gellar's portrayal of Buffy] when it comes to fighting bad guys." Bell is sometimes confused with Lauren Conrad from The Hills. "Yeah, sometimes fans yell, 'Hey, Lauren' to me, but usually from a distance," said Bell.

Despite "new celebrity" status, Bell claimed that she was not concerned because "no one ever recognizes me anyway". She has said that her friend Hayden Panettiere is more famous than she is and attracts more attention; as Bell explained, "I hang out with Hayden quite a bit—they never take pictures of me. I just step to the side, and I push myself in front of her when she wants to get out of it, or put her in the car."

Bell was a recurring guest on The Late Late Show with Craig Ferguson, appearing in interviews as well as sketches. On The Late Late Show, she repeatedly showed a humorous hostility towards Craig Ferguson's robot skeleton sidekick Geoff Peterson, claiming that she had wanted to be Ferguson's sidekick on his show and taking it upon herself to cut Peterson down every chance she got. Both Bell and Peterson appeared with Ferguson during the five Late Late Show episodes filmed in France in 2011.

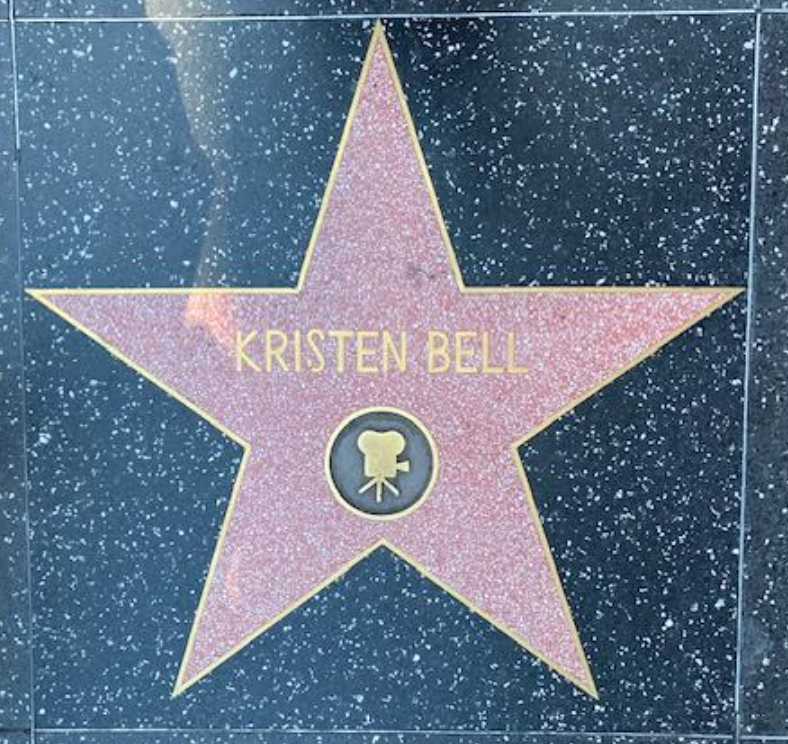
Bell's star on the Hollywood Walk of Fame

In January 2011, it was announced that Bell would be the new face of Neutrogena. In 2014, Bell posed nude for the May issue of Allure magazine – alongside Jenna Dewan, Minnie Driver, and Nia Long. In April 2019, Bell was featured on the cover of Entrepreneur magazine's April–May issue. In the article, she discussed her snack bar company, This Bar Saves Lives, which donates its sales to help feed malnourished children around the globe. In November 2019, Bell and Idina Menzel, who play sisters in Disney's Frozen franchise, received neighboring stars—Bell's was the 2681st and Menzel's was the 2682nd—on the Hollywood Walk of Fame.

== Personal life ==
=== Relationships and family ===
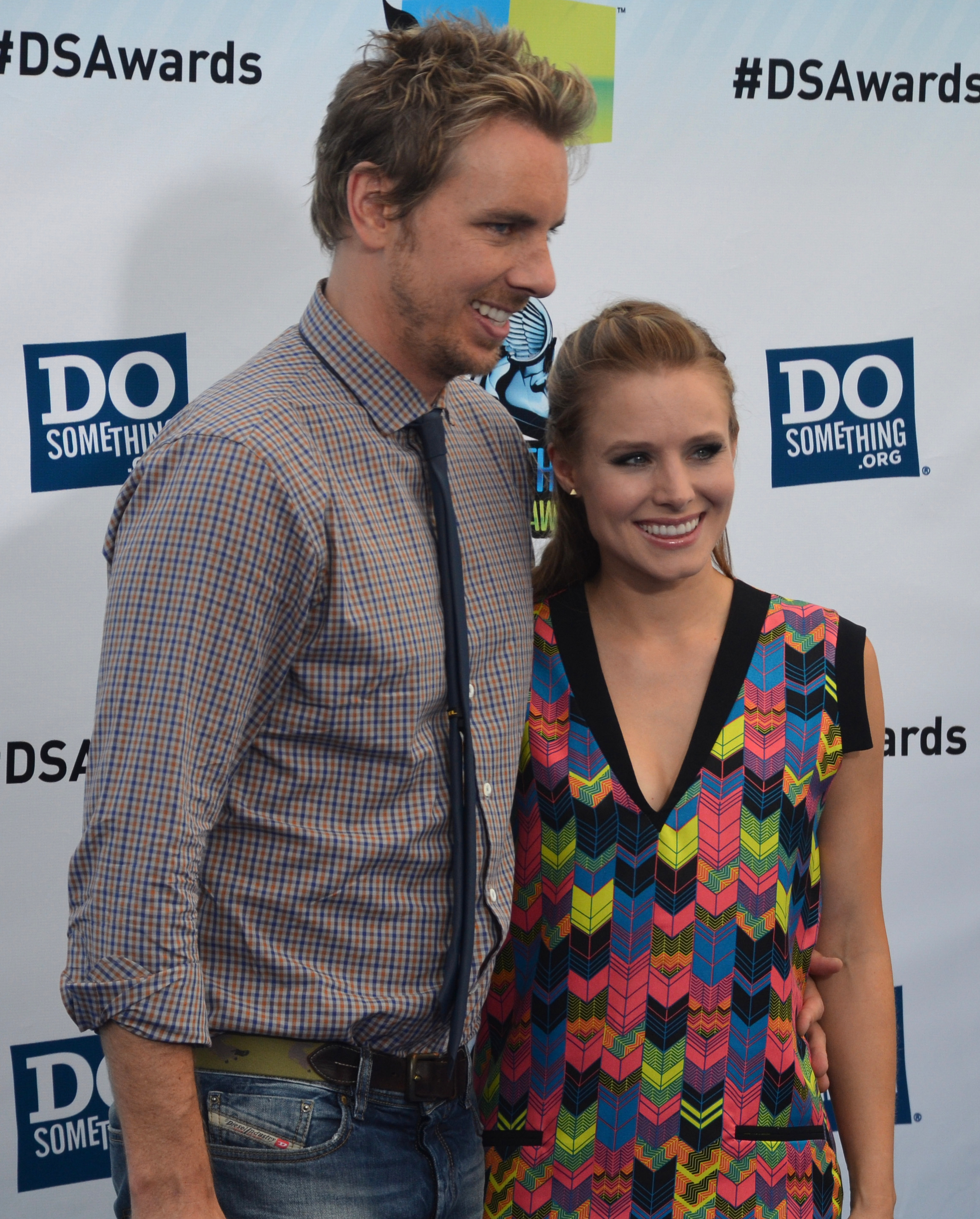
Dax Shepard and Bell at the 2012 DoSomething Awards

In 2007, Bell ended a five-year relationship with former fiancé Kevin Mann. She later told Complex magazine that dating "makes me want to vomit. And not out of grossness—OK, a little bit out of grossness, but just nerves... I've always been a serial monogamist."

In late 2007, Bell began dating actor Dax Shepard, who is also from the Detroit metropolitan area. They announced their engagement in January 2010. They decided to delay marriage until the state of California passed legislation legalizing same-sex marriage. They co-starred in the 2010 film When in Rome, the 2012 film Hit and Run, and the 2017 film CHiPs. After section 3 of the Defense of Marriage Act was ruled unconstitutional by the Supreme Court on June 26, 2013, Bell asked Shepard to marry her through Twitter, which he accepted. They were married at the Beverly Hills County Clerk's Office on October 16, 2013. They have two daughters, born in March 2013 and December 2014.

=== Mental health ===
In May 2016, Bell said that she has received treatment for depression and anxiety. She said, "It's important for me to be candid about this so people in a similar situation can realize that they are not worthless and that they do have something to offer." In a March 2020 blog post, Bell wrote, "Don't be fooled by this game of perfection that humans play. Because Instagram and magazines and TV shows, they strive for a certain aesthetic, and everything looks so beautiful, and people seem like they don't have any problems, but everyone's human. Everyone has problems. Everyone feels yucky on the inside sometimes."

=== Beliefs and interests ===
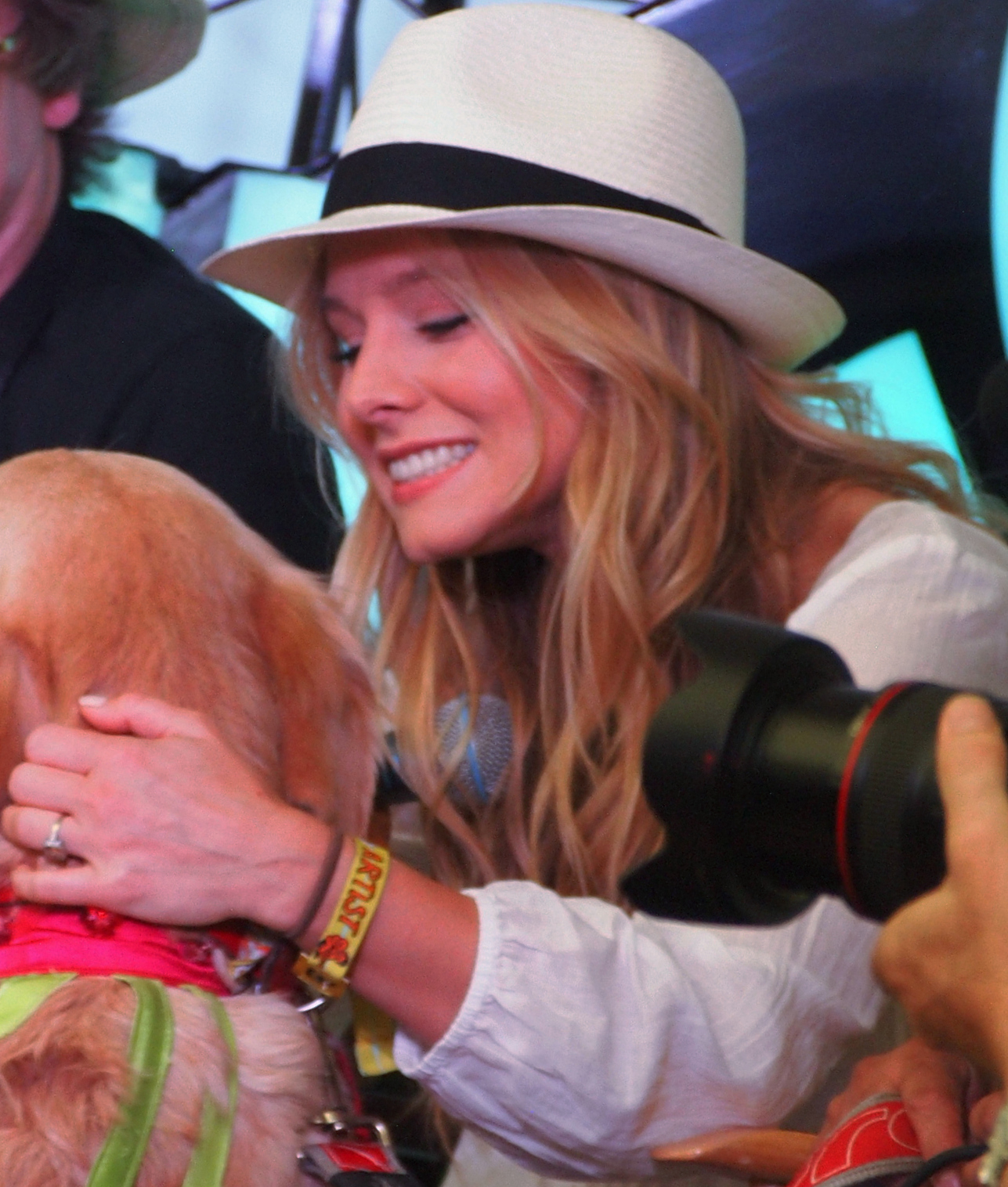
Bell with the Dancing Merengue Dog at the 2012 Bonnaroo Music Festival

At age 11, Bell became a vegetarian. In an interview with PETA, Bell discussed her pets, "I have always been an animal lover. I had a hard time disassociating the animals I cuddled with—dogs and cats, for example—from the animals on my plate, and I never really cared for the taste of meat. I always loved my Brussels sprouts!" By 2012, Bell and Shepard had become vegan after watching the documentary Forks Over Knives. However, during her first pregnancy she went back to eating dairy products and eggs. She started eating meat in 2022.

Bell has said that she is non-religious and identifies as a humanist. She and her husband Dax Shepard are pro-vaccination. Bell supported and campaigned for Barack Obama during the 2008 United States presidential election. Along with Rashida Jones, she visited college campuses in Missouri to discuss the candidates and encourage voter registration. Bell showed support for the Writers Guild of America in the writers' strike, appearing in the picket lines in December 2007, stating, "the writers are just looking for some fairness".

In 2023, Bell revealed that she had taken up Brazilian jiu-jitsu. She was training under Cesalina Gracie in mother-daughter classes alongside her daughter.

=== Charity work ===
During her time in Michigan, Bell fostered animals from the Michigan Humane Society, and she now supports the San Diego–based Helen Woodward Animal Center. Bell often attends fundraisers for the American Society for the Prevention of Cruelty to Animals and other non-profit organizations dedicated to protecting animals. She has had several dogs, including a Welsh Corgi-Chow Chow mix named Lola, a Welsh Corgi-Chihuahua mix named Shakey and a black Labrador Retriever named Sadie, who was 11-years-old when she was rescued from Hurricane Katrina and adopted by Bell in 2005.

Bell and other Veronica Mars cast members, including Ryan Hansen, are involved with the charity Invisible Children, Inc. The goal of the organization is to create awareness of the plight of Northern Ugandans who are caught in the midst of a civil war between the government and Joseph Kony's Lord's Resistance Army. In 2014, Bell launched a Prizeo campaign offering fans a chance to win a date with her in return for donating to Invisible Children, Inc. In 2018, Bell participated in a television advertisement for bone marrow donations, specifically the Gift of Life Marrow Registry. Her actions resulted in several matches that are documented on the Gift of Life website. Bell won a 2020 Webby Special Achievement Award.

In 2013, Kristen Bell, along with actors Ryan Devlin, Todd Grinnell, and Ravi Patel, founded the granola bar company This Bar Saves Lives to help fight malnutrition. The business donates food aid in the form of nutrition packets to children in Haiti, South Sudan, Ethiopia, and Somalia. Since its launch, the company has donated more than 10 million packets as of February 2019.

=== Entrepreneurship ===
In 2019, Bell and her husband founded the company Hello Bello that markets plant-based baby care products said to be environmentally friendly and affordable. As of 2021, Hello Bello's estimated annual revenue was $26.1 million a year with 104 employees. In 2020, she partnered to start Happy Dance, a line of vegan CBD products such as eye cream and hand moisturizers. In 2023, Hello Bello filed for Chapter 11 bankruptcy, blaming years of declining sales and the financial startup crisis. The company is set to be acquired by private equity firm Hildred Capital Management.

== Discography ==
Kristen Bell's discography
Track title	Year	Peak position						Certifications	Album
Track title	Year	US	AUS	CAN	IRE	KOR	UK	Certifications	Album
"Do You Want to Build a Snowman?" (with Agatha Lee Monn and Katie Lopez)	2013	51	45	61	—	5	26	RIAA: 5× Platinum; ARIA: Gold; BPI: Gold	Frozen (Original Motion Picture Soundtrack)
"For the First Time in Forever" (with Idina Menzel)	2013	57	62	70	54	11	38	RIAA: 4× Platinum; ARIA: Gold; BPI: 2× Platinum	Frozen (Original Motion Picture Soundtrack)
"Love Is an Open Door" (with Santino Fontana)	2013	49	91	—	—	13	52	RIAA: 3× Platinum; BPI: Silver	Frozen (Original Motion Picture Soundtrack)
"For the First Time in Forever (Reprise)"	2013	—	—	—	—	—	—	RIAA: Platinum	Frozen (Original Motion Picture Soundtrack)
"Text Me Merry Christmas" (featuring Straight No Chaser)	2014	—	—	—	—	55	—		Under the Influence
"Tell Me How Long"	2017	—	—	—	—	—	—		Chasing Coral (Original Motion Picture Soundtrack)
"That Time of Year"	2017	—	—	—	—	—	—	RIAA: Gold	Olaf's Frozen Adventure Soundtrack
"Some Things Never Change" (with Idina Menzel, Josh Gad, Jonathan Groff)	2019	—	—	—	—	54	—	RIAA: 2× Platinum; BPI: Gold	Frozen 2 (Original Motion Picture Soundtrack)
"The Next Right Thing"	2019	—	—	—	—	84	—	RIAA: Gold; BPI: Silver	Frozen 2 (Original Motion Picture Soundtrack)
