= Cruelty (disambiguation) =

Cruelty is the intentional infliction of suffering or inaction toward another's suffering.

Cruelty may also refer to:

- Cruelty (1959 film), a Soviet film
- Cruelty (2016 film), an Icelandic film
- Cruelty: Black Rose Torture, a 1975 Japanese film

== See also ==
- Cruel (disambiguation)
