= Cruel (disambiguation) =

To be cruel is to cause, be indifferent to or take pleasure from suffering.

Cruel may also refer to:

== Songs ==
- "Cruel" (Alfie Arcuri song), 2016
- "Cruel" (Dane Rumble song), 2009
- "Cruel" (Human Nature song), 1998
- "Cruel" (Snakehips song), 2016
- "Cruel" (Tori Amos song), 1998
- "Cruel" (The Veronicas song), 2015
- "Cruel", by Blancmange from Happy Families, 1982
- "Cruel", by Calexico from Garden Ruin, 2006
- "Cruel", by Dropkick Murphys from Going Out in Style, 2011
- "Cruel", by Foxes from All I Need, 2016
- "Cruel", by Glowie, 2019
- "Cruel", by Hiromi Matsuura, 2005
- "Cruel", by the House of Love from Babe Rainbow, 1992
- "Cruel", by the Human League from Travelogue, 1980
- "Cruel", by Jax Jones from Snacks (Supersize), 2019
- "Cruel", by Jeff Buckley and Gary Lucas from Songs to No One 1991–1992, 2002
- "Cruel", by Kate Rusby, adapted from a traditional song, from Underneath the Stars, 2003
- "Cruel", by Kelly Clarkson from Meaning of Life, 2017
- "Cruel", by Prefab Sprout from Swoon, 1984
- "Cruel", by Public Image Ltd. from That What Is Not, 1992
- "Cruel", by St. Vincent from Strange Mercy, 2011
- "Cruel", by Thomas Dolby from Astronauts & Heretics, 1992
- "Cruel", by Toto from Mindfields, 1999
- "Cruel", by Twice from Formula of Love: O+T=<3, 2021

== Other uses ==
- Cruel (solitaire), a solitaire card game
- Cruel Coppinger, a semi-legendary figure in Cornish folklore
- Jessica Cruel, American magazine editor
- Katie Cruel, a fictional character from a traditional American folksong
- Mr. Cruel, unidentified 20th-century Australian child murderer and rapist

== See also ==
- Cruella de Vil, Animated series villain
- List of people known as the Cruel
