= List of Kristen Bell performances =

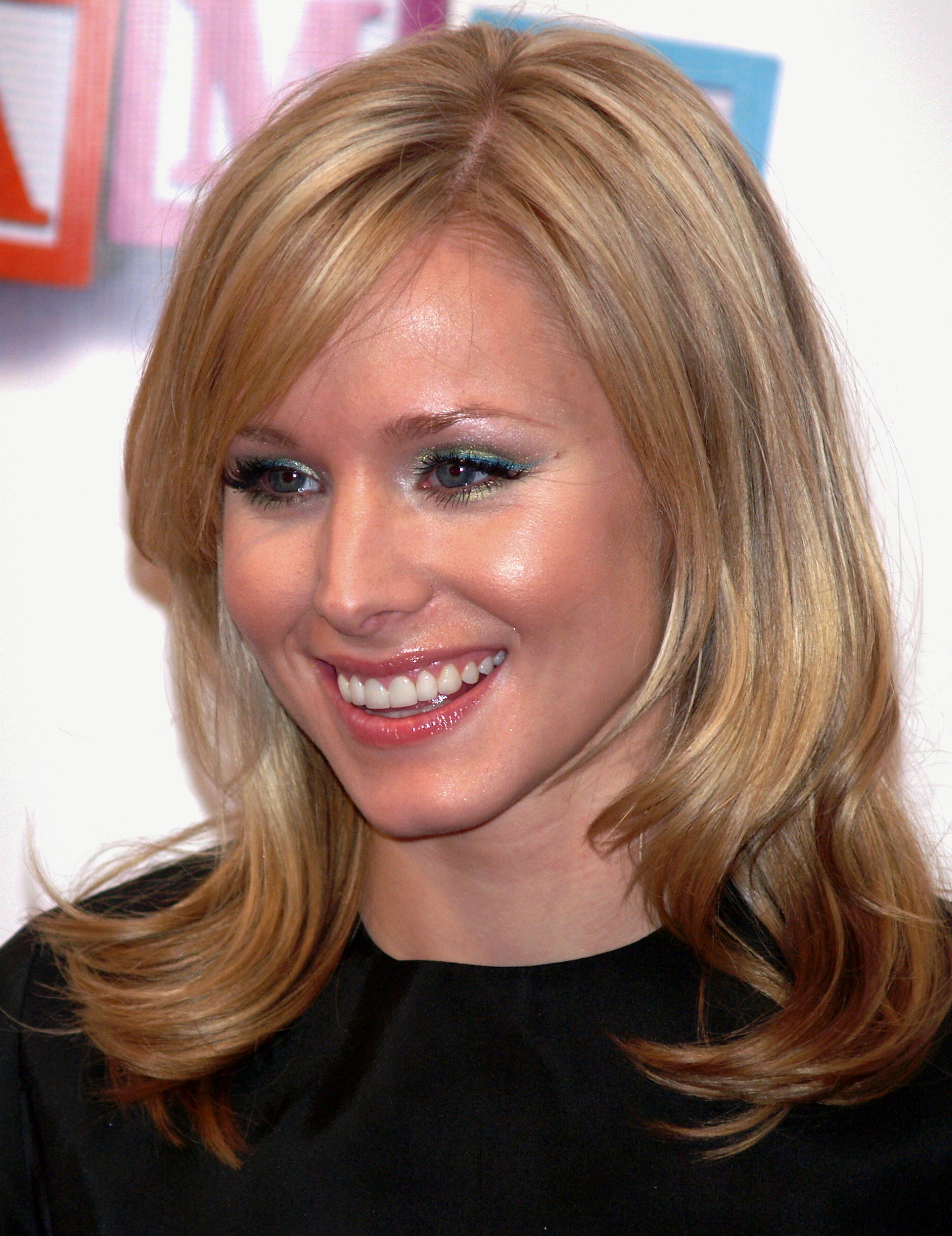
Bell at the 2008 Tribeca Film Festival

Kristen Bell is an American actress and singer. She began her acting career in stage productions, making her Broadway debut as Becky Thatcher in the 2001 comedy musical The Adventures of Tom Sawyer and appearing in a Broadway revival of The Crucible the following year.

Bell received a Saturn Award for Best Actress on Television for her performance as the title character in the television series Veronica Mars (2004–2007). She reprised the role in the 2014 film and the 2019 revival. She starred in the lead role of Eleanor Shellstrop on the NBC comedy series The Good Place (2016–2020), receiving a Golden Globe Award nomination for her role. She voiced the titular narrator in the teen drama series Gossip Girl (2007–2012), reprising the role in the 2021 sequel.

In film, Bell had her major breakout film role as the title character in Forgetting Sarah Marshall (2008). She has since appeared in a number of comedy films, including Couples Retreat (2009), When in Rome (2010), You Again (2010), and The Boss (2016). Bell received further recognition for voicing Princess Anna in the Disney animated film Frozen (2013), and its sequel Frozen 2 (2019).

== Film ==
Film
Year	Title	Role	Notes	Ref.
1998	Polish Wedding	Teenage Girl	Uncredited	
2001	Pootie Tang	Record Executive's Daughter		
2002	People Are Dead	Angela's Friend #1		
2003	The King and Queen of Moonlight Bay	Alison Dodge		
2003	The Cat Returns	Hiromi	Voice; English dub	
2004	Spartan	Laura Newton		
2006	Pulse	Mattie Webber		
2006	Roman	The Girl / Isis		
2007	Flatland	Hex	Voice; short film	
2008	Forgetting Sarah Marshall	Sarah Marshall		
2009	Fanboys	Zoe		
2009	Serious Moonlight	Sara		
2009	Astro Boy	Cora	Voice	
2009	Couples Retreat	Cynthia Smith		
2010	Astro Boy vs. The Junkyard Pirates	Cora	Voice; short film	
2010	Lost Masterpieces of Pornography	June Crenshaw	Short film	
2010	When in Rome	Elizabeth Ann "Beth" Martin		
2010	Get Him to the Greek	Sarah Marshall	Cameo	
2010	You Again	Marni Olivia Olsen		
2010	Burlesque	Nicole Finnegan		
2011	Scream 4	Chloe	Cameo	
2012	Safety Not Guaranteed	Belinda St. Sing		
2012	Big Miracle	Jill Jerard		'
2012	Flatland 2: Sphereland	Hex	Voice; short film	
2012	Hit and Run	Annie Bean	Also co-producer	
2012	Stuck in Love	Tricia Walcott		
2013	Movie 43	Supergirl	Segment: "Super Hero Speed Dating"	
2013	Some Girl(s)	Bobbi		
2013	The Lifeguard	Leigh London		
2013	Frozen	Anna	Voice	
2014	Veronica Mars	Veronica Mars	Also executive producer	
2015	Frozen Fever	Anna	Voice; short film	
2015	Unity	Narrator	Voice; documentary	
2016	Zootopia	Priscilla	Voice cameo	
2016	The Boss	Claire Rawlings		
2016	Bad Moms	Kiki Moore		
2017	The Disaster Artist	Herself		
2017	CHiPs	Karen Baker		
2017	How to Be a Latin Lover	Cindy		
2017	A Bad Moms Christmas	Kiki Moore		
2017	Olaf's Frozen Adventure	Anna	Voice; short film	
2018	Pandas	Narrator	Voice; documentary	
2018	Teen Titans Go! To the Movies	Jade Wilson	Voice	
2018	Like Father	Rachel Hamilton		
2018	Ralph Breaks the Internet	Anna	Voice	
2019	Frozen 2	Anna	Voice	
2021	Queenpins	Connie Kaminski		
2022	The People We Hate at the Wedding	Alice Stevenson		
2023	Paw Patrol: The Mighty Movie	Janet	Voice	
2023	Once Upon a Studio	Anna	Voice; short film	
2026	Violent Night 2 †	Mrs. Claus	Post-production	
2027	Sonic the Hedgehog 4 †	Amy Rose	Voice; in production	
2027	Frozen 3 †	Anna	Voice; in production	

== Television ==
Television
Year	Title	Role	Notes	Ref.
2003	The Shield	Jessica Hintel	Episode: "The Quick Fix"	
2003	American Dreams	Amy Fielding	Episode: "Act of Contrition"	
2003	The O'Keefes	Virginia's Owner	Episode: "Substitute Teacher"	
2003	Everwood	Stacey Wilson	Episode: "Extra Ordinary"	
2004	Deadwood	Flora Anderson	2 episodes	
2004	Gracie's Choice	Gracie Thompson	Television film	
2004–2007, 2019	Veronica Mars	Veronica Mars	Lead role; also executive producer (season 4)	
2005	Reefer Madness: The Movie Musical	Mary Lane	Television film	
2005–2014	The Late Late Show with Craig Ferguson	Herself	16 episodes	
2007–2008	Heroes	Elle Bishop	Main cast (season 2); recurring role (season 3)	
2007–2012	Gossip Girl	Gossip Girl / Herself	Voice for character Gossip Girl; uncredited cameo as herself (Episode: "New York, I Love You XOXO")	
2009	The Cleveland Show	Mandy	Voice; episode: "Da Doggone Daddy-Daughter Dinner Dance"	
2009–2010	Party Down	Uda Bengt	2 episodes	
2011	Glenn Martin, DDS	Hayley	Voice; episode: "Videogame Wizard"	
2011	Robot Chicken	Sara Lee	Voice; episode: "Some Like It Hitman"	
2012–2016	House of Lies	Jeannie van der Hooven	Lead role (5 seasons)	
2012	Unsupervised	Megan	Voice; 13 episodes	
2012–2014	CMT Music Awards	Herself	Host; television special	
2013–2014	Parks and Recreation	Ingrid de Forest	3 episodes	
2013, 2020	Hollywood Game Night	Herself	2 episodes	
2013	Lady Gaga and the Muppets Holiday Spectacular	Herself	Television special	
2015	Repeat After Me	Herself	Episode: "1.2"	
2015	Liv and Maddie	Herself	Episode: "Ask Her More-a-Rooney"	
2015	30th Independent Spirit Awards	Herself	Co-host; television special (with Fred Armisen)	
2015	It's Your 50th Christmas, Charlie Brown	Herself	Co-host; television special	
2015, 2021	The Simpsons	Harper Jambowski, Marge Simpson	Voice for character Harper Jambowski, singing voice for character Marge Simpson; episodes: "Friend with Benefit", "The Star of the Backstage"	
2016	iZombie	Herself	Voice; episode: "Fifty Shades of Grey Matter"	
2016	LEGO Frozen Northern Lights	Anna	Voice; television special	
2016–2020	The Good Place	Eleanor Shellstrop	Lead role: 53 episodes; directed episode: "The Funeral to End All Funerals"	
2017	Nobodies	Herself	Episode: "Too Much of a Good Thing"	
2017	Jimmy Kimmel Live!	Herself	Guest host; episode: May 4, 2017 (standing in for Jimmy Kimmel)	
2017	BoJack Horseman	Ruthie	Voice; episode: "Ruthie"	
2017	Family Guy	Martha	Voice; episode: "Petey IV"	
2017	Encore!	Herself	Host; television special; also executive producer	
2017–2018	Big Mouth	Various voices	Voice; 4 episodes	
2018	24th Screen Actors Guild Awards	Herself	Host; television special	
2018	The Ellen DeGeneres Show	Herself	Guest host; episode: May 31, 2018 (standing in for Ellen DeGeneres)	
2018	The Joel McHale Show with Joel McHale	Herself	Episode: "Pizza Ghost"	
2019	Last Week Tonight with John Oliver	Herself	Episode: "Compounding Pharmacies"	
2019–2020	Encore!	Herself	Host (12 episodes); also executive producer	
2020	#KidsTogether: The Nickelodeon Town Hall	Herself	Host / moderator of COVID-19 special; also executive producer	
2020	Into the Unknown: Making Frozen 2	Herself	Documentary	
2020, 2022	Central Park	Molly Tillerman, Abby	Voice; main role (season 1 and 3)	
2021–2023	Gossip Girl	Gossip Girl	Voice	
2021	Ultra City Smiths	Donella Pecker	Voice; main role	
2021	HouseBroken	Juliet	Voice; episode: "Who's a Good Therapist?"	
2021–2022	Do, Re & Mi	Mi	Voice; main role; also executive producer	
2022–2023	The Tiny Chef Show	Herself	3 episodes; also executive producer	
2022	The Woman in the House Across the Street from the Girl in the Window	Anna Whitaker	Miniseries; main role; also executive producer	
2022	Norman Lear: 100 Years of Music & Laughter	Herself	Television special	
2022	Zootopia+	Priscilla	Voice; episode: "Dinner Rush"	
2023	StoryBots: Answer Time	Ms. Cafeteria Worker Lady	Episode: "Refrigerator"	
2024–present	Nobody Wants This	Joanne Williams	Main role; also executive producer	
2024	A Man on the Inside	Extra	Uncredited cameo	
2025	31st Screen Actors Guild Awards	Herself	Host; television special	
2025	Hacks	Herself	Episode: "Clickable Face"	
2026	32nd Actor Awards	Herself	Host; television special	

== Video games ==
Video games
Year	Title	Role	Notes	Ref.
2007	Assassin's Creed	Lucy Stillman	Voice and likeness	
2009	Astro Boy: The Video Game	Cora	Voice	
2009	Assassin's Creed II	Lucy Stillman	Voice and likeness	
2010	Assassin's Creed: Brotherhood	Lucy Stillman	Voice and likeness	
2013	Disney Infinity	Anna	Voice	
2014	Disney Infinity 2.0	Anna	Voice	
2015	Disney Infinity 3.0	Anna	Voice	
2019	Kingdom Hearts III	Anna	Voice	
2023	Disney Speedstorm	Anna	Voice	

== Web series ==
Web series
Year	Title	Role	Notes	Ref.
2012	Burning Love	Mandy		
2014	Play It Again, Dick	Herself		
2017	Ryan Hansen Solves Crimes on Television	Herself	Episode: "Freezed"	
2018–2020	Momsplaining with Kristen Bell	Herself	Main role	
2019	Hot Ones	Herself	Episode: "Kristen Bell Ponders Morality While Eating Spicy Wings"	

== Music videos ==
Music videos
Year	Title	Artist	Ref.
2010	"Madder Red"	Yeasayer	
2017	"Santa's Coming for Us"	Sia	
2019	"Lost in the Woods"	Weezer	

== Theater ==
Theater
Year	Title	Role	Notes	Ref.
1992	Raggedy Ann and Andy	Banana, Tree	Detroit theater	
2001	The Adventures of Tom Sawyer	Becky Thatcher	Minskoff Theatre, Broadway	
2001	Reefer Madness	Mary Lane	Variety Arts Theater, Off-Broadway	
2002	The Crucible	Susanna Walcott	Virginia Theatre, Broadway	
2002	A Little Night Music	Fredrika Armfeldt	Kennedy Center, Washington, D.C.	
2003	Sneaux	Sneaux Devareaux	Matrix Theatre, Los Angeles	
2004	A Little Night Music	Fredrika Armfeldt	Los Angeles Opera, Los Angeles	
2009	Heathers: The Musical	Veronica Sawyer	3 Los Angeles Workshops	
2014	Hair	Sheila Franklin	Hollywood Bowl, Los Angeles	
2023	Gutenberg! The Musical!	Producer	James Earl Jones Theatre, Broadway; one night only	
2024	Reefer Madness	Mary Lane	The Whitley, Los Angeles; two performances only	
2026	Three Months Later	Maggie	Jim Henson Studios, Los Angeles; three performances only	
