= Nylon (magazine) =

American fashion magazine

- December 2013/January 2014 cover featuring Demi Lovato
- Categories: Fashion
- Frequency: Monthly
- Total circulation: 216,466 (2012)
- First issue: April 1999; 27 years ago
- Final issue: October 2017
- Company: Bustle Digital Group
- Country: United States
- Based in: New York City
- Website: nylon.com
- ISSN: 1524-1750

Nylon is an American multimedia brand and publishing company, which produces a lifestyle magazine that focuses on pop culture and fashion. Its coverage includes art, beauty, music, design, celebrities, technology, and travel. Originally a print publication, it switched to an all-digital format in 2017. Its name references New York and London, and it is currently owned by the Bustle Digital Group (BDG). In 2023, the magazine announced it would return to print in 2024. It continues to release a print magazine biannually.

== History ==
Nylon was co-founded in 1999 by editorial director Mark Blackwell, art director Madonna Badger, creative director Helena Christensen, development director Michael "Mic" Neumann, and the husband and wife publishing team of Marvin and Jaclynn Jarrett, with an initial investment from businessperson Sam Waksal. The Jarretts, Blackwell and Neumann had previously worked together in the same roles at Ray Gun Magazine. The Jarretts had recently sold their shares in Ray Gun Publishing. According to Jaclynn Jarrett, the magazine's name was chosen because her husband Marvin liked the sound of Nylon. After picking it, they realized that NY and LON could link the brand to New York and London, which was congruent with Nylon's editorial focus in these two cities. The design of the magazine was intended to be "hyper-legible", in an attempt to mitigate against the criticism of Ray-Gun's "chaotic" layouts. The first issue was published on April 6, 1999.

In 2003, Nylon launched its website nylonmag.com (now nylon.com) under the leadership of Ronen Shapiro. Later that year, the digital readership surpassed the print edition and became the center of Nylon's business. In 2005, Nylon was bought by Pennsylvania businessman Don Hellinger. The following spring, Nylon and MySpace collaborated on their first International Music issue. Nylon was freely available online for a time. Nylon TV was launched in 2006 with the creation of its own YouTube channel, and by 2014 had 62 thousand subscribers and 62 million cumulative views. Nylon partnered with MySpace in 2006 for its annual June/July music issue. Nine months later, the magazine became generally available online, in digital form in March 2007. Nylon released its June/July International Music and MySpace issue online for free viewing. Marvin Jarrett's editor's letter described it as a collaboration with MySpace, focusing on eight "music and style mecca" cities around the world, featuring the famous White Stripes on the cover, as selected by Nylon's MySpace fans.

Nylon teamed up with Live Nation Entertainment in 2008 to produce its first Nylon Music Tour, headlined by electro-rockers She Wants Revenge.

On its 10-year anniversary in 2009, Nylon made the April 1999 inaugural issue freely available online, including all articles, in scanned form. Later that year, Nylon partnered with iTunes for its annual music issue, which included a free summer playlist download of 22 tracks.

Nylon came together with YouTube in 2010 for its Young Hollywood issue, allowing readers to watch the entire issue. That year also brought the launch of Nylon Dailies, emails written by local writers every day in ten key American cities.

In 2011, then-President Don Hellinger and then-CFO Jami Pearlman were charged with operating an illegal money transmission business (for an online casino), unrelated to Nylon. They subsequently pleaded guilty to a reduced charge.

Nylon joined with Facebook in 2012 for its June/July music issue. 2012 also brought a Summer Music Tour, featuring Neon Trees, sponsored by Starbucks. America's Next Top Model announced that Nylon would be its media partner for the show's 19th reincarnation.

In May 2014, Nylon was acquired by a new ownership group, including an affiliate of LA-based investor Marc Luzzatto through Diversis Capital, LLC. The new venture also acquired FashionIndie, with FashionIndie's founders, Beca Alexander and Daniel Saynt, maintaining their titles of editor-in-chief and creative director, respectively. The new owners did not retain publisher Marvin Jarrett. The staff learned of the takeover via the press.

In September 2017, it announced it was transitioning to an all-digital platform. The print edition of Nylon was discontinued between October 2017 and 2019, and the print staff was laid off. Upon the departure of the core print team, only two original staff members, of the 60-odd employees from before the sale in 2014, remained. One was digital team senior editor, Gabrielle Korn, who was then promoted to editor-in-chief.

In June 2019, Nylon was acquired by the Bustle Digital Group, founded by Bryan Goldberg. Its current editor-in-chief is Lauren McCarthy.

== International editions ==
=== Asia ===
- Nylon Japan, which first hit Tokyo newsstands in 2004, is now run by editor-in-chief Takashi Togawa.
- Nylon Korea premiered in August 2008, and in April 2014, K-pop girl band Girls' Generation (also known as SNSD), was featured in Nylon international editions. In March 2018, the publisher of Nylon Korea was acquired by Krispy Studio, a subsidiary of kakao M (formerly LOEN Entertainment), from Seoul Cultural Publishers.
- Nylon Indonesia began publishing in 2011. It ceased publication in 2017.
- Nylon Singapore, launched in 2012 and went fully digital in 2017.
- Nylon Thailand
- Nylon China
- Nylon Manila (Philippines), launched in November 2020 by One Mega Group as a digital magazine.

=== Europe ===
- Nylon Germany
- Nylon Spain
- Nylon France (published as Nylon FR), launched in March 2021 as a digital magazine. The French edition is also edited on printed every two months with a limited drop in selected stores and on the magazine's e-shop.

=== Latin America ===
- Nylon Mexico

== Former editors-in-chief ==
- Marvin Scott Jarrett was the original editor-in-chief from the time of the magazine's creation to his departure in 2014.
- Michelle Lee was named editor-in-chief in 2014, then named editor-in-chief of Allure magazine in 2015.
- Melissa Giannini was named editor-in-chief in 2015.
- Gabrielle Korn was named editor-in-chief in 2018.
- Alyssa Vingan was named editor-in-chief in 2019.
- Lauren McCarthy was named editor-in-chief in 2023 and is the current EIC.

== Cover models ==
The first Nylon cover model for the debut issue was actress Liv Tyler in April 1999. She was both photographed and interviewed by Nylon magazine's co-founder, creative director, and supermodel Helena Christensen.

Cover models have included: Demi Lovato, Christina Aguilera, The Horrors, Avril Lavigne, Selena Gomez, Lily Allen, Paris Hilton, The Kills, Camilla Belle, Grimes, Karen O, Evan Rachel Wood, Mary-Kate Olsen, Lea Michele, Lil' Kim, Zooey Deschanel, Kristen Stewart, Rachel Bilson, Scarlett Johansson, Cory Kennedy, Mischa Barton, Christina Ricci, Leighton Meester, Blake Lively, Taylor Momsen, The White Stripes, Sienna Miller, Nicole Richie, Megan Fox, Hilary Duff, Emma Stone, Lindsay Lohan, MIA, Zoe Saldaña, Drew Barrymore, Jessica Szohr, Mila Kunis, Emily Browning, Katy Perry, Jena Malone, Abbie Cornish, Vanessa Hudgens, Jamie Chung, Emma Roberts, Chloë Grace Moretz, Lily Collins, Hayley Williams, Marina, and Lana Del Rey.

== Reception ==
Media Life Magazine's Jennifer Cox wrote in 2001 that Nylon was "a little uppity, and it's not hard to understand why", describing it as "bold, idiosyncratic, challenging, absolutely of-the-moment," but unnoticed by "the mainstream" until March 2001, when Nylon was nominated for the ASME National Magazine award. She described the April issue as "groundbreaking" (for a fashion magazine) to feature an overweight woman in a history of women's weight, and noted that the magazine's models "are more often interesting looking than beautiful per se." She found its photo spreads "bold with their use of white space and innovative photography" and noted Nylon's distinctive "heavy emphasis on music coverage."

=== Recognition ===
The American Society of Magazine Editors noted the magazine three times: Nylon was nominated for "National Magazine Award for General Excellence (100,000–400,000 circulation)" in 2001, was a finalist for "General Excellence (100,000 to 250,000 circulation)" in 2003, and was a finalist for the 2006 ASME "Design" award.

In 2006, Nylon was a Nominee at the 10th Annual Webby Awards, in the Fashion category, and an Official Honoree at the 12th Annual Webby Awards in the Magazine category in 2008.

In 2008 industry monitor Media Industry News Online editors selected Nylon.com as the penultimate of their "Top 5 Women's Fashion Mag Website Picks", judging on "visual appeal, functionality and usefulness of information". They found it to be the "destination of choice for alternative, fashion minds everywhere", and "...Nylon's entertainment radar is still alive and well. Its funky illustrations and graphics give Nylon a hip, unique look that is truly hard to come by in the category. Nxtbook provides slick, downloadable digital magazine issues".

== Brand extensions ==
The magazine had Radar, Fashion, and Style pages. There was also a Nylon Guys magazine, first announced in 2003 and published independently in 2004, which featured Joseph Gordon-Levitt from 500 Days of Summer.

Nylon partnered with Rizzoli Publishing to publish three books: Street, on global street fashion; Pretty, on beauty; and Play, on music. Pretty: The Nylon Book of Beauty was listed in the New York Public Library's best Books for the Teen Age 2008. In 2009 Jarrett founded Nylon Records and signed French female pop group Plastiscines as its first act, after seeing them on the cover of French fashion and style magazine Citizen K. Also in 2009, Nylon introduced its iPhone app; MinOnline listed it (among "Top 5 iPhone Mags You May Have Missed") as "a pleasant surprise. This fashion and culture mag has one of the more attractive magazine-like designs among print brands on mobile."

The September 2010 issue of the magazine was released on the iPad, including video, music, and some exclusive content. The iPad edition is in the Apple iTunes newsstand.

== Bibliography ==
- Street: The Nylon Book of Global Style. Universe (2006). ISBN 978-0-7893-1501-4.
- Pretty: The Nylon Book of Beauty. Universe (2007). ISBN 0-7893-1539-4.
- Street View: The New Nylon Book of Global Style. Universe (2010). ISBN 978-0-7893-2088-9.
