= Nylon Guys =

American men's magazine (2004–2015)

- Nylon Guys cover (November 2009 issue)
- Categories: Fashion magazine
- Frequency: Bimonthly
- First issue: 2004
- Final issue: 2015
- Company: Nylon Holding Inc.
- Country: United States
- Based in: New York City
- Language: English
- Website: www.nylonguysmag.com
- ISSN: 1931-2784

Nylon Guys was an American magazine devoted to men. Its coverage focused on the interests of guys, including art, music, design, technology, fashion and travel.

== History ==
Nylon Guys was founded in 2004 by the original co-creator of Nylon, Jaclynn Jarrett. It began as a companion publication being included with issues of Nylon.

Nylon Guys was published seasonally, twice a year with a circulation of 110,000 copies. The magazine featured a variety of celebrity men on their covers, including Jesse Eisenberg, Gerard Way, Joseph Gordon-Levitt, Pharrell Williams, and Michael Pitt.

Nylon Guys evolved into an online-only all-digital magazine in 2015. The editor in chief was Michelle Lee between 2014 and late 2015.
