= Linda Wells =

American journalist and editor

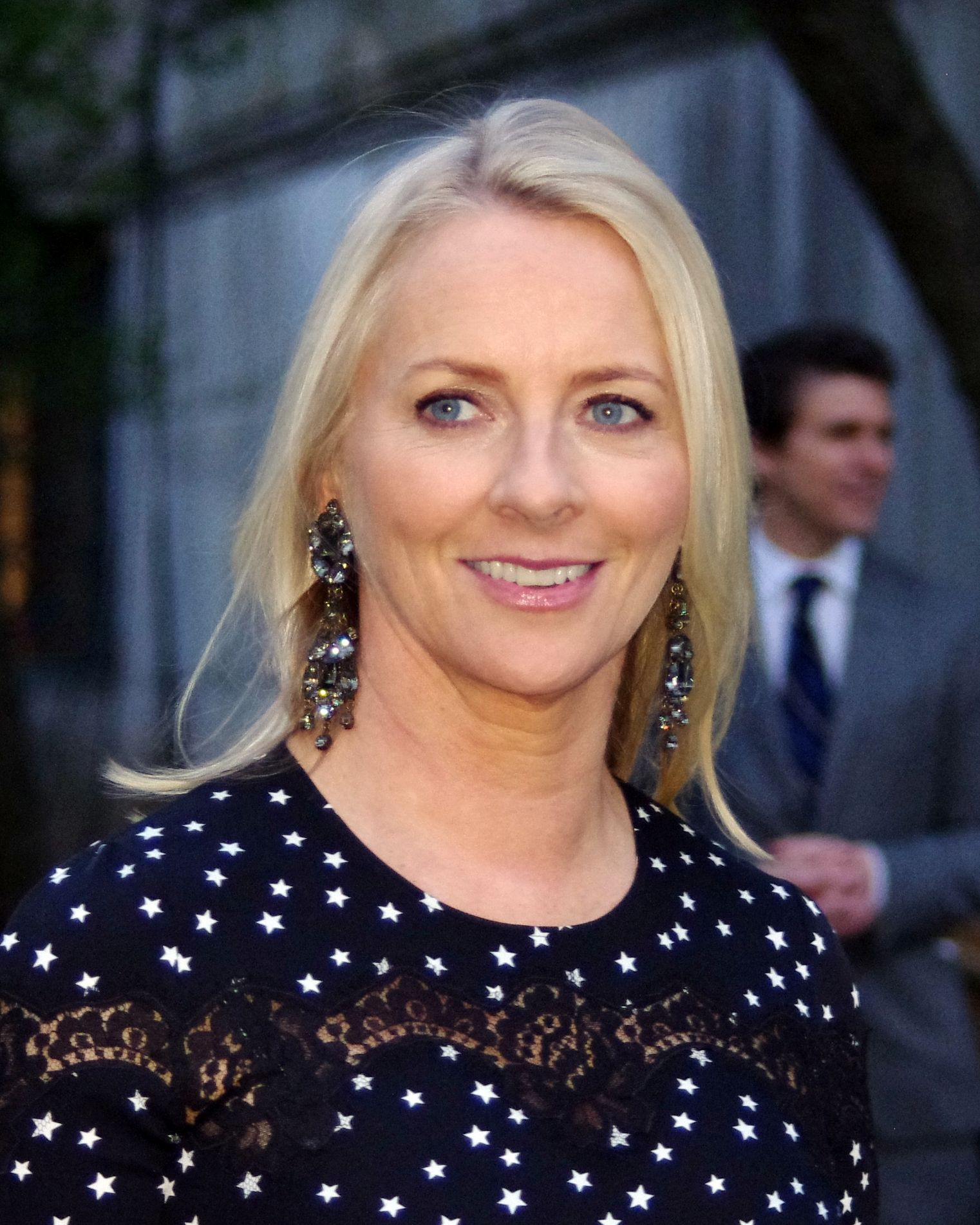
Wells at the 2012 Tribeca Film Festival

Linda Wells is an American journalist and founder of Allure magazine and the makeup brand Flesh.

== Early life ==
Wells graduated in 1976 from Mary Institute and graduated from Trinity College, located in Hartford, Connecticut, in 1980.

== Career ==
Wells began her journalism career at Vogue, where she wrote and edited stories about beauty, health, nutrition, and fitness. In 1985, she joined The New York Times as a reporter, ultimately becoming the beauty editor and the food editor of The New York Times Magazine. In 1991 Wells founded Allure magazine and served as the editor-in-chief until 2015. Wells's editor's letter has been praised for tackling a variety of topics with honesty. Women's Wear Daily gave her an "A" rating in its Editors' Report Card column acknowledging her "backbone." In 2006, Wells, with her editors at Allure, wrote her first book, Confessions of a Beauty Editor (Bulfinch). In 2009, Forbes named her the number 5 most powerful fashion magazine editor. In 2017, Wells became Chief Creative Officer of Revlon. In 2018, Wells launched her own beauty brand named Flesh.
