= Hiromi Matsuura =

Japanese singer-songwriter (born 1984)

- 松浦ひろみ
- Born: August 31, 1984 (age 41); Kochi, Japan
- Other names: Hiroron; Hiromi Yamato

Hiromi Matsuura (松浦ひろみ, Matsūra Hiromi) is a Japanese singer-songwriter.

== Music career ==
Matsuura made her musical debut in September 2005 under the stage name Hiromi Matsuura with the single "Cruel", produced by Joplin Tokuno of Kome Kome Club. Her first release charted at number 3 on the Japanese Singles Chart.

In April 2006, she released her second single, "Save Me"', which was taken up as the theme song of the PS2 game Mitsu x Mitsu Drops. In October 2006, she released her first album, Romantic Fantagic. The album met with a great deal of commercial success, with four of the tracks being used in television commercials. She then started to make appearances as a radio and Internet personality.

Unable to deal with stress brought about by commercial success, she gave up her Internet presence in September 2007. While her third single, "Happy Life",' was picked up by Misawa Homes for a television commercial, she took a break from the entertainment industry for several months, not resurfacing until March 2008, when she started to change her image to a more sexually explicit one. In October 2008, Hiromi made her first acting appearance in a nude video, Hiromi Matsuura: Singer-songwriter in Explicit Debut (現役シンガーソングライター松浦ひろみ 限界露出デビュー), which was followed in the next few months by some other gravure videos.

In April 2009, she published a second album, Angel Virgin. In conjunction with this for promotional purposes she appeared in the AV movie Singer Active Shock Debut! And Immediately Retire! (現役シンガー衝撃デビュー!そして即引退!) by Idea Pocket, creating a scandal as she embarked on a 12-stop nationwide singing tour to promote her album.

== Discography ==
- Romantic Fantagic (October 25, 2006)
- Angel Virgin (April 22, 2009)
