= Jessica Cruel =

American magazine editor

Jessica Cruel (born August 14, 1989) is an American magazine editor. She is the editor-in-chief of Allure, where she leads the development of editorial content for digital and video platforms. Cruel was appointed to her current role in August 2021.

== Professional life ==
In her early career, Cruel embarked on a number of internships and editorial positions across magazines including Skirt! Magazine and Self, a Condé Nast publication. She went on to work at PopSugar as associate director and returned to Self as Senior Editor before joining Refinery29 as deputy beauty editor.

Cruel joined Allure as a features director in 2019 where she worked across print and digital on projects like the Allure Readers’ Choice Awards before taking over as content director in 2021. Cruel was appointed editor-in-chief of Allure in August 2021.

Cruel is an advocate for evolution in the beauty industry and is noted for her inclusive leadership style, which is credited for positively changing the working environment of newsrooms. In 2021, Cruel spearheaded The Melanin Edit, a new Allure platform exploring all things relating to Black beauty, skincare and wellness. She also created the first ever Allure Best of Beauty live event in New York in October 2023.

== Personal life ==
Jessica Cruel was born in Nashville, Tennessee and grew up in a number of small towns across the American South, including Albany, Georgia. Cruel studied Multimedia Journalism at University of North Carolina at Chapel Hill and received a Bachelor's degree. She also has a B.A in Sociology and is a home renovation enthusiast.

== TV appearances ==
- The Black Beauty Effect (Netflix)
- The Hair Tales (Hulu)
- Hairstyle (Discovery+)
