= Veronica Mars season 4 =

Veronica Mars
- Season 4
- Promotional poster
- Starring: Kristen Bell; Enrico Colantoni; Jason Dohring
- No. of episodes: 8

Release
- Original network: Hulu
- Original release: July 19, 2019

Season chronology
- ← Previous; Season 3

The fourth and final season of Veronica Mars, an American drama television series created by Rob Thomas, consists of eight episodes that were all released on Hulu on July 19, 2019. It serves as a continuation of the 2004 to 2007 television series as well as the 2014 film. Kristen Bell reprises her role as the title character, and it features the return of several characters from the original series as well as the introduction of new ones.

== Production and development ==
On August 21, 2018, it was reported that Hulu was planning an eight-episode revival of Veronica Mars with Kristen Bell returning in the title role and series creator Rob Thomas returning as well. On September 6, 2018, it was reported that production would begin in October 2018 and continue through March 2019 in Los Angeles. Diane Ruggiero-Wright and Dan Etheridge returned as executive producers. On September 20, 2018, Hulu officially confirmed the revival, and announced it would premiere in 2019. The season was originally scheduled for release on July 26, 2019, however, during the series' appearance at San Diego Comic-Con on July 19, it was announced that season would be available that day.

Along with Thomas and Ruggiero, the writing staff consists of Heather V. Regnier, David Walpert, Raymond Obstfeld, and former NBA player and author Kareem Abdul-Jabbar.

Bell stated that the season was "going to be darker and bigger and more cinematic, a little bit different" in comparison to the original series. Thomas stated the season takes place five years after the film and would "take Veronica Mars back to its hardcore So-Cal noir roots" and that it is "One big case [...] This is a detective show."

The revival features a new version of the original theme song, "We Used to Be Friends" by The Dandy Warhols, covered by Chrissie Hynde of The Pretenders.

== Plot ==
Veronica Mars (Kristen Bell) and her father Keith (Enrico Colantoni) are private investigators in Neptune, California, a popular spring break vacation destination. Real estate developer Richard "Big Dick" Casablancas (David Starzyk) campaigns for the enactment of city beautification laws; local business owners protest the likely expense of complying with such laws. Meanwhile, Veronica rejects a marriage proposal from her longtime boyfriend Logan Echolls (Jason Dohring).

When a beachside motel is bombed, the Marses are hired to investigate by US Representative Daniel Maloof (Mido Hamada), whose brother's fiancée was killed in the explosion. A Mexican crime boss, whose nephew was another victim, sends two assassins, Alonzo (Clifton Collins Jr.) and Dodie (Frank Gallegos), to find and kill the bomber. Injured in the blast is Penn Epner (Patton Oswalt), a true crime enthusiast, who seizes the spotlight to accuse Maloof of the crime. The late motel owner's daughter, Matty Ross (Izabela Vidovic), investigates on her own; Veronica eventually takes her under her wing to supervise her. Veronica also befriends nightclub owner Nicole Malloy (Kirby Howell-Baptiste), and occasionally consults with Penn and his club of amateur crime-solvers.

Their investigation implicates a local ex-con, who apparently commits suicide before he can be arrested. However, after his death, three more bombs explode in Neptune over several days. The Marses uncover evidence that Casablancas' fixer Clyde Pickett (J. K. Simmons) has hired the local juvenile delinquents, organized by Veronica's former friend Eli "Weevil" Navarro (Francis Capra), to mug spring break visitors, driving away tourism. Casablancas will then buy beachfront property cheaply, planning to redevelop the land for more upscale businesses.

Veronica's ex-boyfriend Leo D'Amato (Max Greenfield), now an FBI agent, arrives to investigate the case. His rekindled flirtation with Veronica eventually makes her realize how much she values her relationship with Logan. She loses her friendship with Nicole when she confesses to considering Nicole a suspect in the case and bugging her office, and decides to accept Logan's proposal.

The Marses eventually conclude that Casablancas was responsible for the bomb at the motel, but the subsequent bombs were the work of a copycat. Casablancas is murdered by Alonzo and Dodie after Clyde tips them off to his guilt. The Marses arrest Penn as the copycat, but he hires them to prove his own innocence. Evidence is uncovered which briefly implicates Penn's fellow amateur crime-solver Don (Clark Duke), but Matty spots that the evidence has been tampered with: Penn was the copycat bomber all along, out for glory and attention. The Marses deduce the site of the next bomb, and Keith disarms the bomb with seconds to spare; but Penn gloats to Veronica as he is being arrested.

Veronica and Logan are married that day. But a few hours later, Veronica's car explodes, killing Logan—one last bomb that Penn had set earlier. The next year, when Neptune is fully gentrified and spring break tourism is a thing of the past, Veronica leaves Neptune to solve cases on the road.

== Cast ==
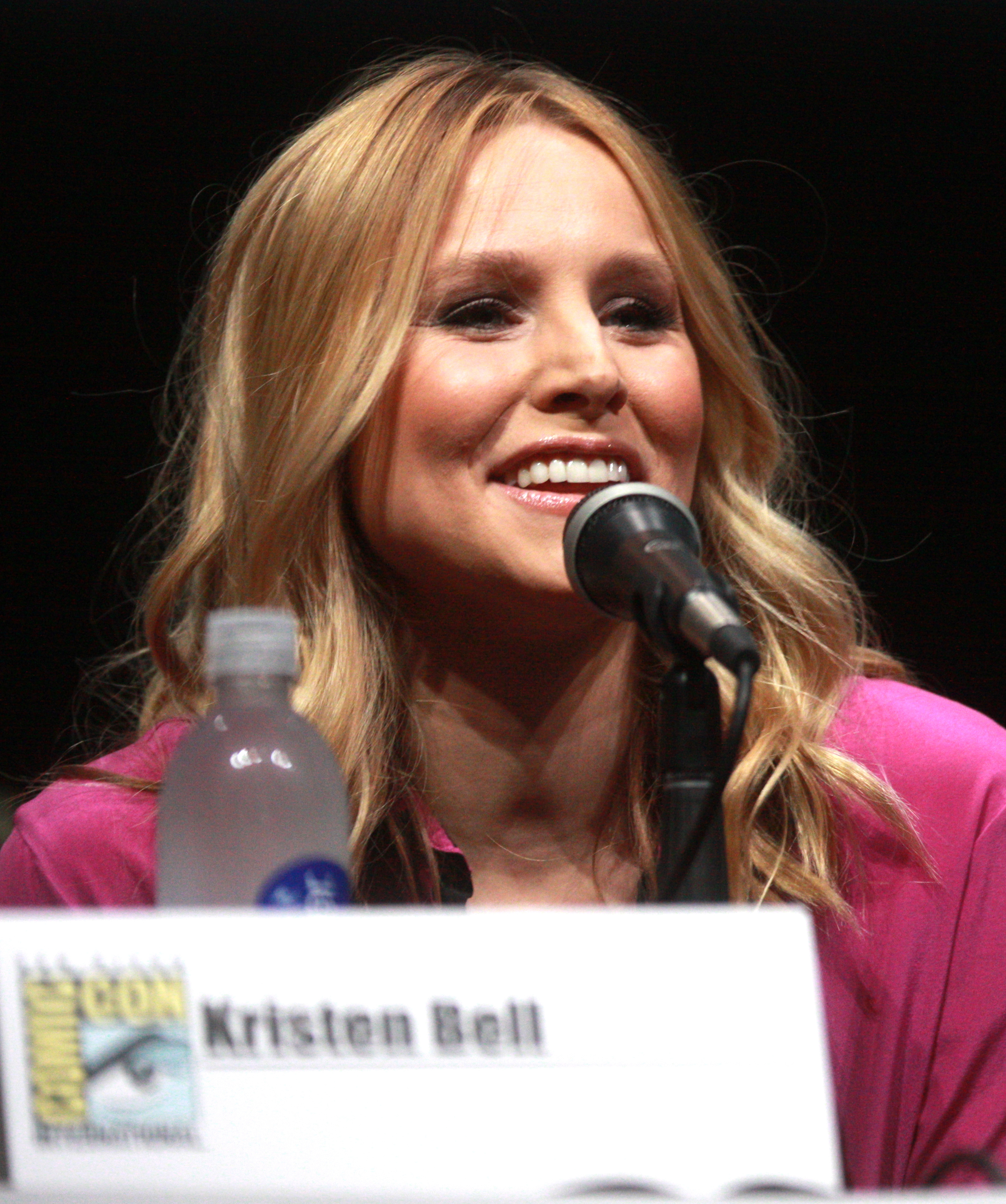
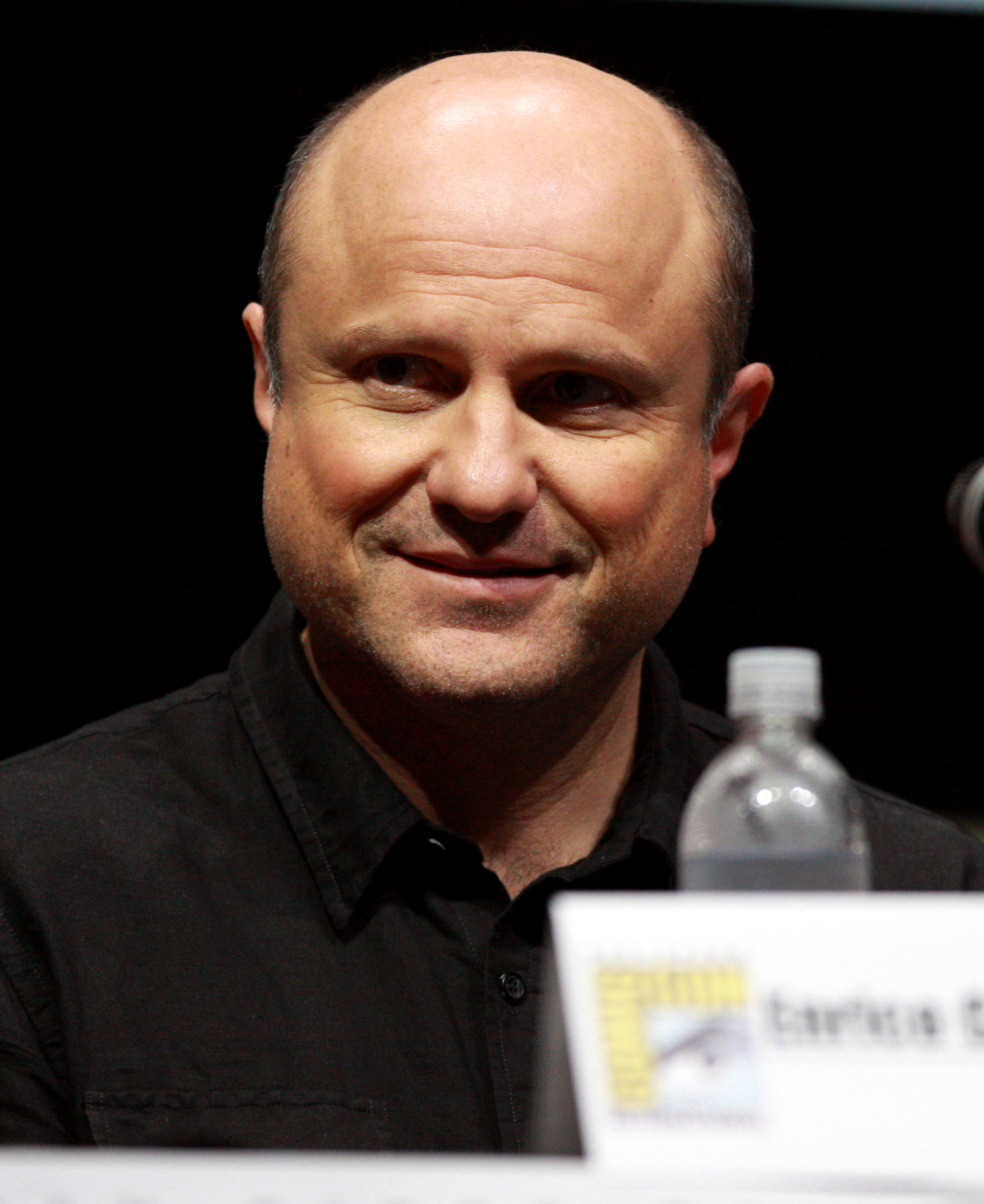
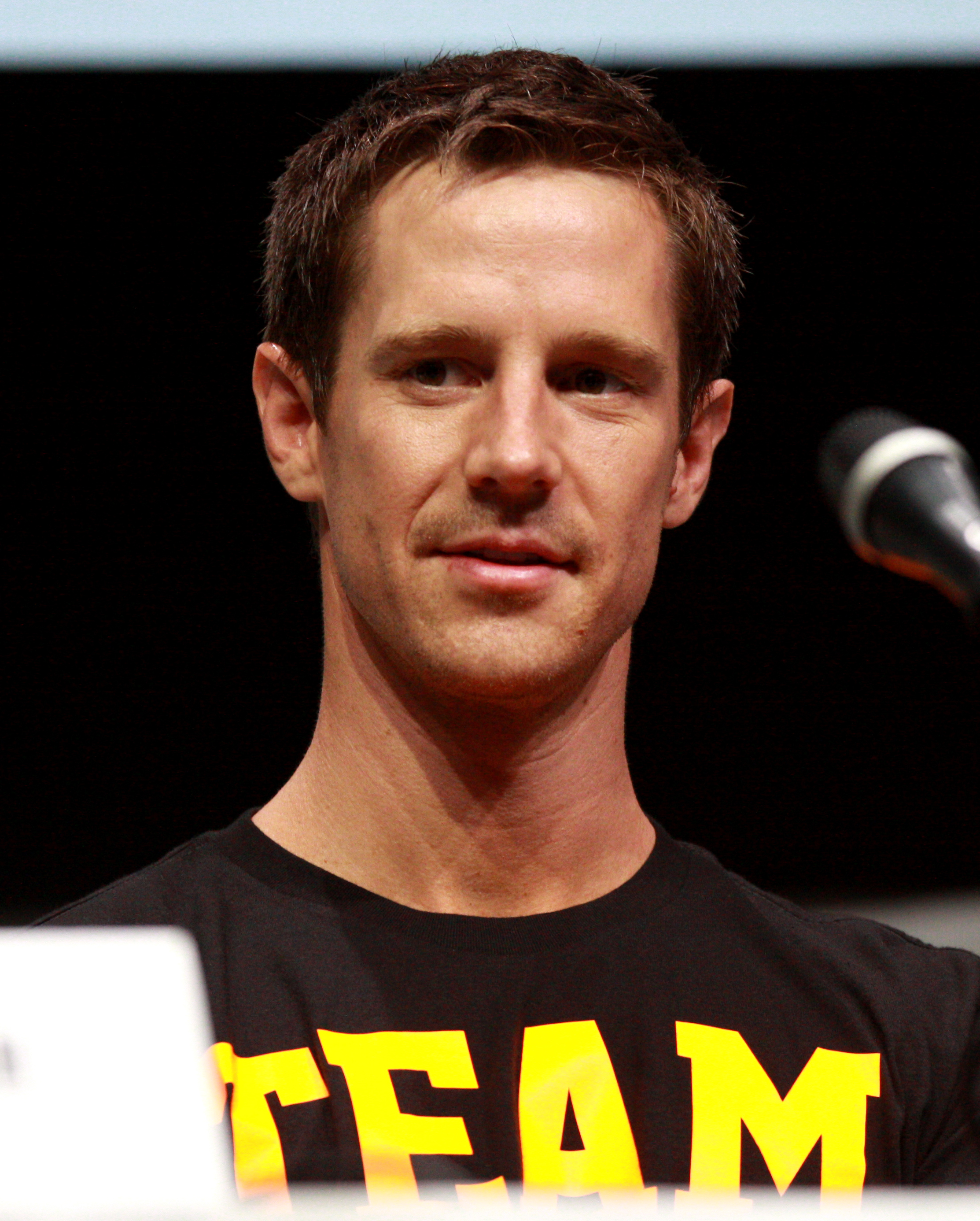
Returning cast members Kristen Bell, Enrico Colantoni and Jason Dohring
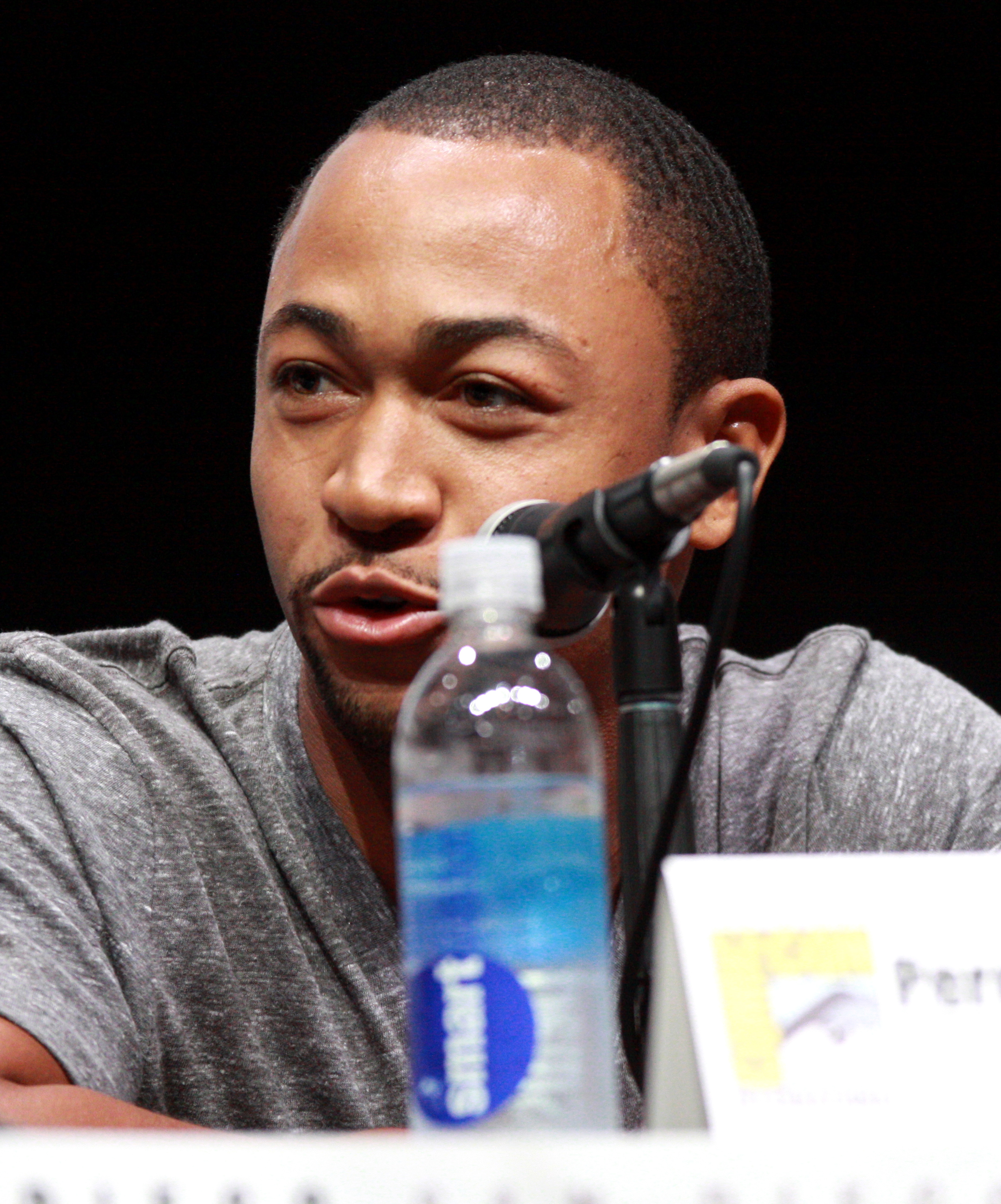
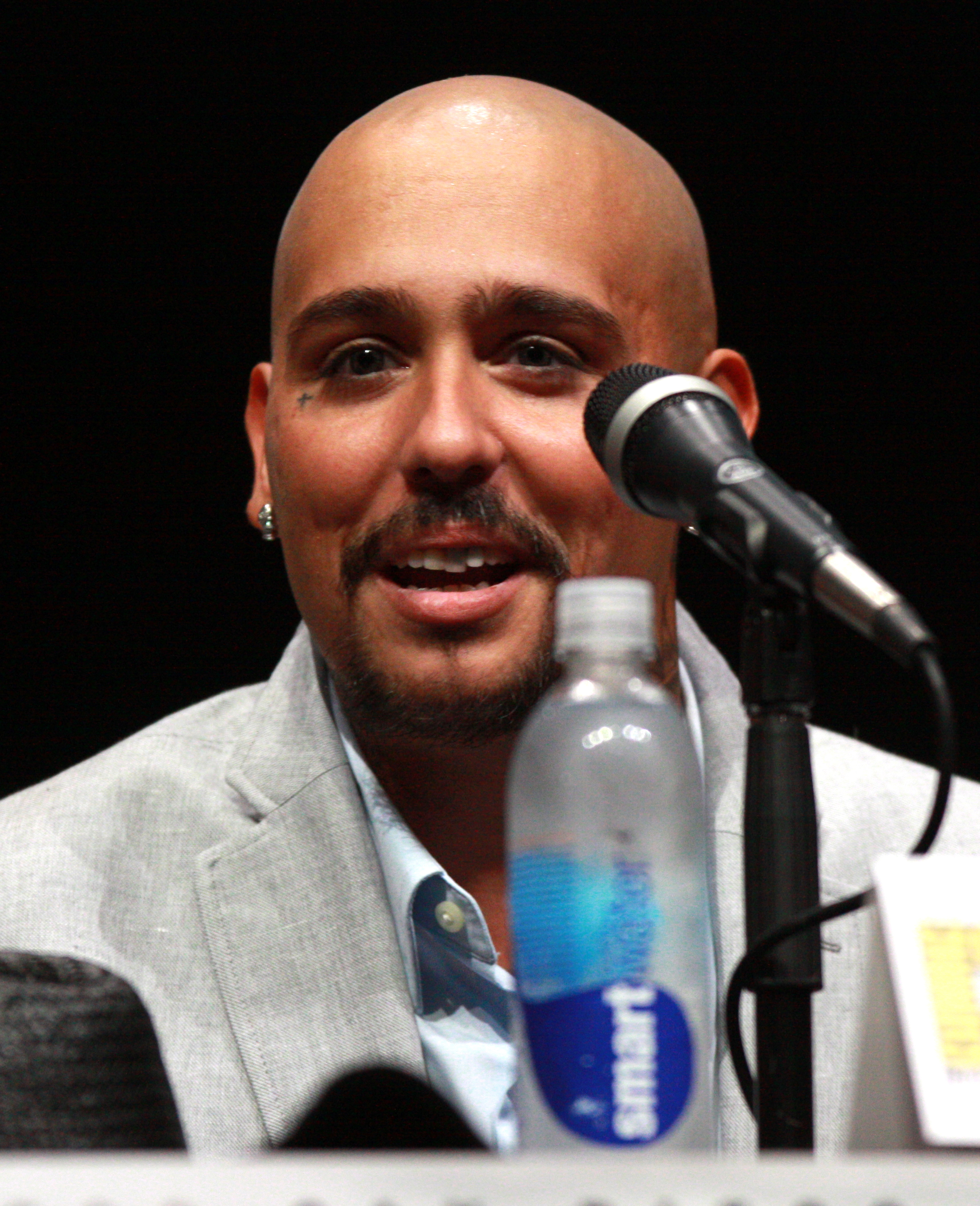
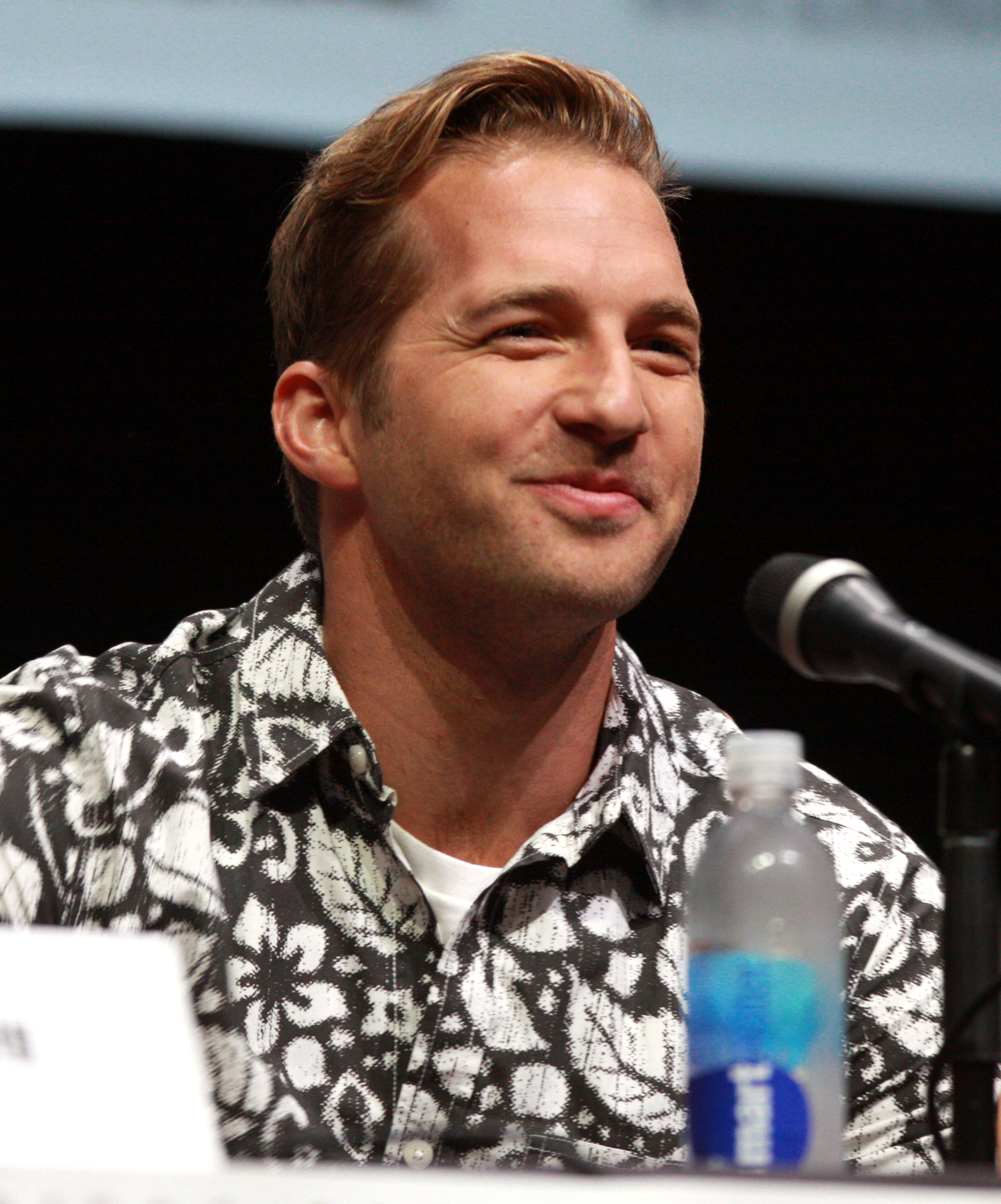
Returning cast members Percy Daggs III, Francis Capra and Ryan Hansen
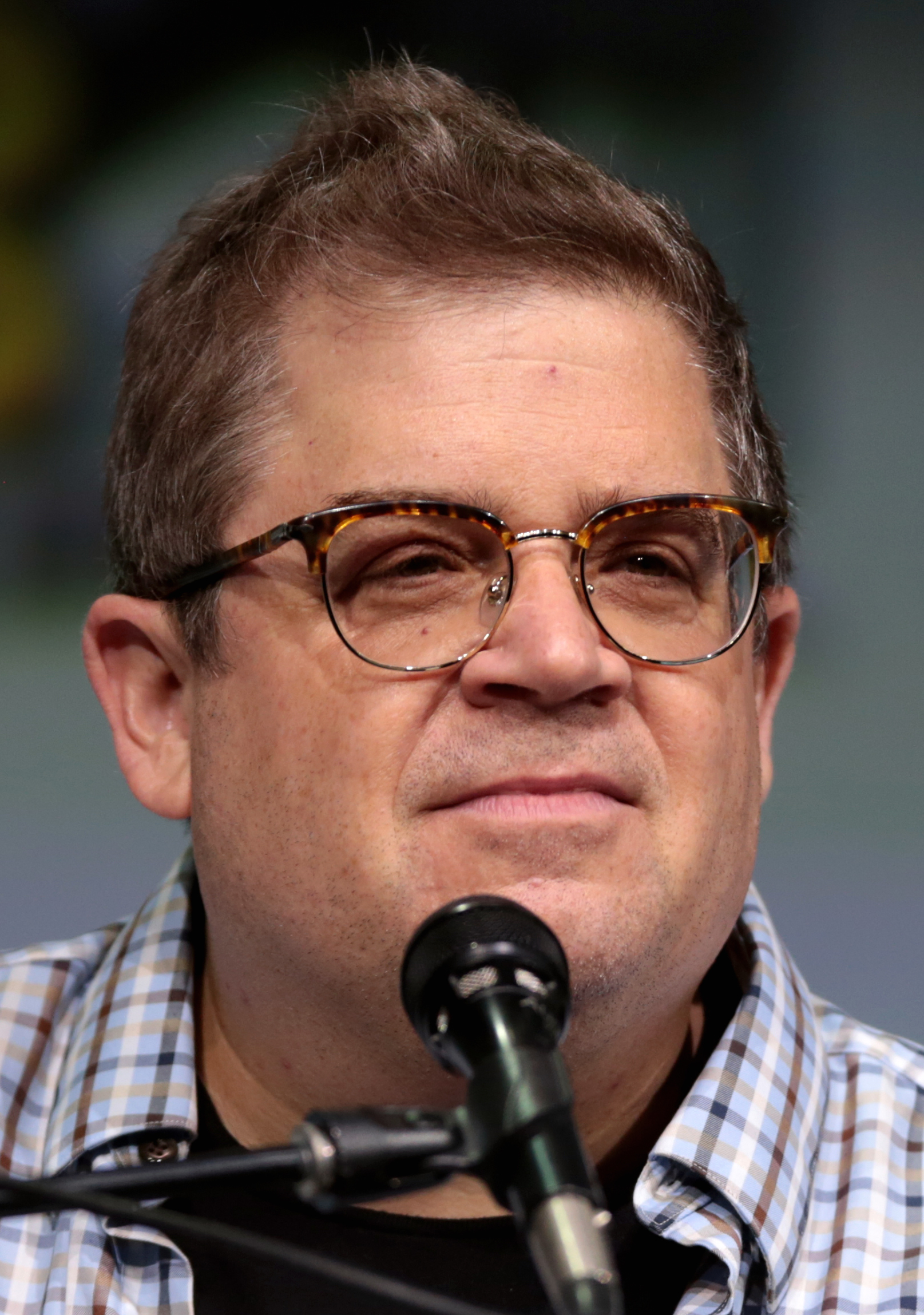
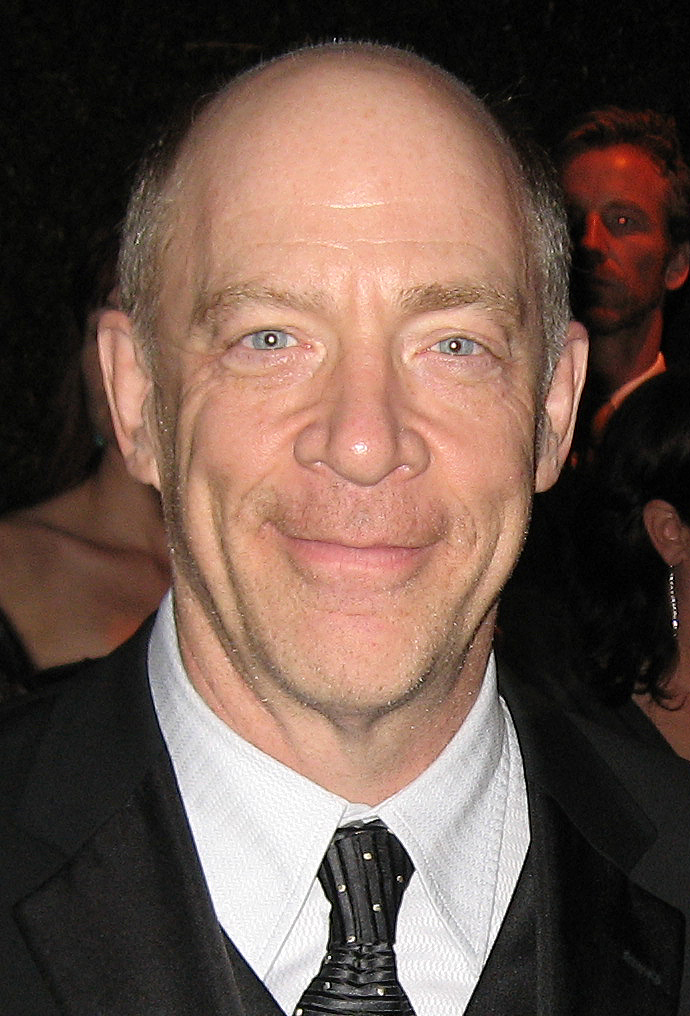
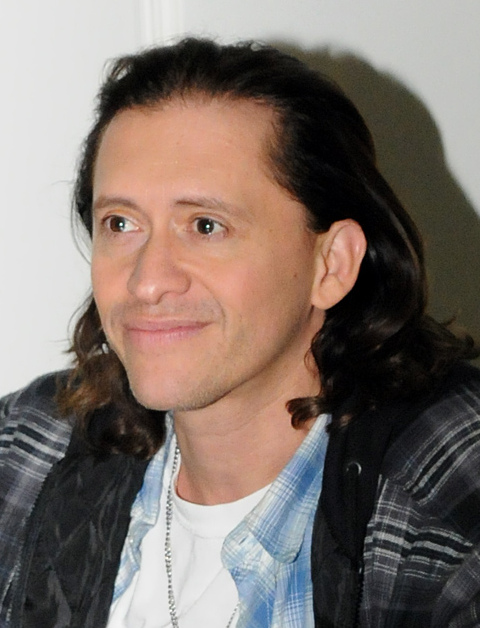
New cast members include Patton Oswalt, J. K. Simmons and Clifton Collins Jr.

=== Main ===
- Kristen Bell as Veronica Mars, a private investigator
- Enrico Colantoni as Keith Mars, Veronica's father and a PI
- Jason Dohring as Logan Echolls, Veronica's boyfriend and a Naval Intelligence Officer

=== Starring ===
- Francis Capra as Eli "Weevil" Navarro, leader of the Pacific Coast Highway biker gang
- Clifton Collins Jr. as Alonzo Lozano, a mid-level hitman for a Mexican cartel
- Percy Daggs III as Wallace Fennel, Veronica's best friend, a high school physics teacher and varsity coach who is now married with a child
- Frank Gallegos as Dodie Mendoza, Alonzo's crime partner
- Max Greenfield as Leo D'Amato, an FBI agent and former boyfriend of Veronica
- Mido Hamada as Daniel Maloof, a Congressman
- Ryan Hansen as Dick Casablancas, Logan's friend and now a movie actor
- Kirby Howell-Baptiste as Nicole Malloy, the owner of a Neptune nightclub
- Dawnn Lewis as Marcia Langdon, the new police chief of Neptune
- Patton Oswalt as Penn Epner, a pizza delivery guy and true crime enthusiast who runs a websleuth group called "Murder Heads"
- David Starzyk as Richard Casablancas, Dick's father and wealthy businessman who is a suspect of the bombings
- Izabela Vidovic as Matty Ross, a teenager who loses her father in one of the bombings
- Jacqueline Antaramian as Amalia Maloof, Daniel's mother
- Paul Karmiryan as Alex Maloof, Daniel's younger brother
- J. K. Simmons as Clyde Pickett, an ex-con working as a fixer for Richard Casablancas

=== Recurring ===
- Daran Norris as Cliff McCormack, a public defender
- Ken Marino as Vinnie Van Lowe, a private investigator and competitor to Veronica and Keith
- Clark Duke as Don, a member of the Murder Heads
- Dannah Phirman as Carol, a member of the Murder Heads
- Tyler Alvarez as Juan-Diego De La Cruz, a member of the PCH biker gang
- Onahoua Rodriguez as Claudia, Weevil's sister
- Patrick Wolff as Hector, Weevil's friend and member of the PCH biker gang

=== Guest stars ===
- Eliza Coupe as Karsyn Farr, a wealthy client of Veronica
- Josh Duhamel as Magnus, Dick's co-star in Catalina Heat
- Rodney Rowland as Liam Fitzpatrick, head of the Fitzpatrick crime family who is now running a shady vending machine company
- Ryan Devlin as Mercer Hayes, a serial rapist in prison at Chino who Veronica caught in season three
- James Jordan as Tim Foyle, the man who killed Dean O'Dell in season three who is serving time in Chino
- Sarah Hyland as Alyssa, a spring breaker
- Adam Rose as Max, Cindy "Mac" Mackenzie's ex-boyfriend from season three who is now running a marijuana dispensary
- Christopher B. Duncan as Clarence Wiedman, a freelance security guard
- Mary McDonnell as Jane, Logan's therapist
- Kyle Secor as Jake Kane, software billionaire and owner of Kane Industries
- Duane Daniels as Van Clemmons, principal of the newly built Kane High
- Julie Gonzalo as Parker Lee, a former girlfriend of Logan
- Keith Morrison as himself

== Episodes ==
No. overall	No. in season	Title	Directed by	Written by	Original release date	Prod. code
65	1	"Spring Break Forever"	Michael Lehmann	Rob Thomas	July 19, 2019	T13.21601
Panic spreads throughout Neptune when a bomb goes off during spring break; the wealthy family of one of the bombing's victims hires Veronica and Keith to find out who is responsible.
66	2	"Chino and the Man"	Michael Fields	Diane Ruggiero-Wright	July 19, 2019	T13.21602
Police Chief Langdon is put on edge when Veronica and Keith begin their investigation into the bombing. Plus, Penn goes public with a wild theory about the bomber's identity and local teen Matty Ross starts her own hunt for her father's killer.
67	3	"Keep Calm and Party On"	Joaquin Sedillo	Heather V. Regnier	July 19, 2019	T13.21603
Veronica and Keith's client, Daniel Maloof, makes a shocking confession; Langdon closes in on her top suspect; Veronica and Matty join forces as the entire investigation is flipped on its head.
68	4	"Heads You Lose"	Rachel Goldberg	David Walpert	July 19, 2019	T13.21604
Convinced that the bomber is still at large, Veronica visits Chino to learn more about Clyde and Big Dick; Mayor Dobbins' request for help from the FBI brings an old flame to Neptune; Veronica confronts her mugger.
69	5	"Losing Streak"	Scott Winant	David Walpert	July 19, 2019	T13.21605
Veronica discovers that Keith has been hiding something scary from her; the real reason for Penn's latest theory on the bomber comes to light; Veronica loses confidence in new friend Nicole, owner of Comrade Quacks.
70	6	"Entering a World of Pain"	Tessa Blake	Kareem Abdul-Jabbar & Raymond Obstfeld	July 19, 2019	T13.21606
As Veronica learns more about Nicole's past, her suspicions deepen; a frantic phone call from Paris leads to a search for Matty; Veronica unwittingly does legwork for Leo.
71	7	"Gods of War"	Amanda Marsalis	Diane Ruggiero-Wright & Heather V. Renier	July 19, 2019	T13.21607
Veronica debates whether to come clean to Nicole; Veronica's fidelity is tested; Veronica and Keith discover that they aren't the only ones who believe they have found the bomber; a surprising potential client tries to hire Mars Investigations.
72	8	"Years, Continents, Bloodshed"	Scott Winant	Rob Thomas	July 19, 2019	T13.21608
Veronica and Keith follow a new lead -- and discover another victim; Matty follows her own instincts, landing herself dangerously close to a killer; Veronica has a tragic epiphany as the clock continues ticking.

== Marketing and promotion ==
The first teaser trailer for the season was released on April 12, and the second on May 1, 2019. A panel for Veronica Mars took place in June 2019 at the ATX Television Festival. A full-length trailer was released on June 14.

== Reception ==
On Rotten Tomatoes, the fourth season has an approval rating of 89% with an average score of 8 out of 10 based on 66 reviews. The site's critical consensus is, "Marshmallows, rejoice! Veronica Mars returns in fine form, capturing much of what made the series so beloved while adding new wrinkles that satisfy more often than they mystify." On Metacritic, the fourth season has a score of 75 out of 100 based on 16 critics, indicating "generally favorable" reviews.

== Home media ==
The season was released on DVD and Blu-ray (as "The Complete First Season (2019)") via the Warner Archive Collection in region 1 on October 22, 2019. Special features include the 2019 Veronica Mars San Diego Comic-Con panel.
