= Michelle Lee (editor) =

American journalist (born 1975)

- Born: Michelle Karen Lee; 1975 (age 50–51); Goshen, New York, US
- Education: University of South Florida
- Occupations: Magazine editor, journalist
- Years active: 1997–present
- Employer: Netflix

Michelle Lee (born 1975) is an American journalist and former editor in chief of Allure.

== Career ==
Michelle Lee is the VP of Global Editorial & Publishing at Netflix, former Editor in Chief of Allure, and a 2021 Adcolor Legend. During her tenure at Allure, Lee was credited with the notable increase in diversity at the brand and for being one of the first digitally-savvy chief editors at Conde Nast. In 2017, Lee made headlines around the world when she declared that Allure would ban the term "anti-aging" and featured Muslim model Halima Aden in July 2017, making Allure the first major women's magazine in the United States to feature a woman in a hijab on the cover. Adweek awarded Lee as Editor of the Year in 2017 and Allure was named Magazine of the Year.

Lee also served as Editor in Chief and chief marketing officer for Allure, Nylon and Nylon Guys, where she was in charge of editorial content as well as branded content and launched Nylon Studio, the brand's in-house creative agency. Lee was co-founder and chief content and strategy officer at branded content agency Magnified Media and was featured as a "Thought Leader" by Google in 2013. She was the SVP of Content at Hollywood.com and the creator and editorial director of the style site Beyond the Row. She has held senior positions at CosmoGIRL, Mademoiselle, Us Weekly, In Touch Weekly, and Glamour.

== Public speaking ==
Lee speaks about the beauty industry, diversity, women's issues, and technology at various conferences, such as South by Southwest, CES, ColorComm, and Advertising Week, and appears regularly on TV for outlets including the NBC's TODAY Show, Good Morning America, VH1, MTV, CNN and MSNBC.

== Awards ==
- Editor of the Year from Adweek (2017)
- Magazine of the Year from Adweek (2017)
- 100 Most Influential Asians of the Year from Gold House A100 (2018)
- Digiday's Glossy 50 (2017)
- Clio Award, Bronze, for Allure Unbound augmented reality app (2017)
- William Randolph Hearst Award for Outstanding Feature Writing
