= Allure (magazine) =

American women's fashion beauty magazine

- March 2021 cover featuring Jennifer Lopez and highlighting the magazine's 30th anniversary
- Editor in Chief: Jessica Cruel
- Categories: Beauty
- Frequency: Monthly
- Publisher: Condé Nast
- Total circulation: 1,165,392 (2013)
- Founded: 1991-2022 (print)
- First issue: March 1991
- Final issue: December 2022 (print)
- Company: Advance Publications
- Country: United States
- Language: English
- Website: www.allure.com
- ISSN: 1054-7711

Allure (stylized in all lowercase) is an American women's fashion beauty magazine, published monthly by Condé Nast in New York City. It was founded in 1991 by Linda Wells. Michelle Lee replaced Wells in 2015. A signature of the magazine is its annual Best of Beauty awards—accolades given in the October issue to beauty products deemed the best by Allure's staff.

== History ==
In 1990, S.I. Newhouse Jr., chairman of Condé Nast, and then editorial director Alexander Liberman approached Linda Wells to develop a concept they had for a beauty magazine. At the time, Wells was the beauty editor and the food editor at The New York Times Magazine.

The magazine's prototype was shredded shortly before the scheduled launch date and, after overhauling everything (including the logo), Allure made its debut in March 1991 designed by Lucy Sisman. The magazine's original format was oversize, but this prevented it from fitting into slots at grocery-store checkouts and required advertisers to resize their ads or create new ones. After four issues, Allure changed to a standard-size glossy format.

In August 2022, Conde Nast announced the December issue would be the last one in print after which the publication would be online only. Allure employees unionized in 2022. Conde states, "It's our mission to meet the audience where they are and with this in mind, after our December print issue, we are making Allure an exclusively digital brand."

=== Editions ===
Note that American Allure still operates digitally.

Country	Circulation dates
United States (Allure)	March 1991–December 2022
South Korea (Allure Korea)	August 2003–present
Russia (Allure Russia)	September 2012–December 2016/January 2017
Philippines (Allure Philippines)	May 2025–present

== Impact ==
Allure focuses on beauty, fashion, and women's health. Allure was the first women's magazine to write about the health risks associated with silicone breast implants, and has reported on other controversial health issues. The influence that Allure magazine had on society was impactful. Using publication to show the new beauty brand and other health needs.

After Lee took the helm in late 2015, the brand was celebrated for promoting diversity and inclusivity. In 2017, Adweek named Allure Magazine of the Year and awarded Lee as Editor of the Year.

The magazine's circulation, initially 250,000 in 1991, is over 1 million as of 2011.

Many writers have contributed to Allure. Among them are Arthur Miller, John Updike, Jhumpa Lahiri, Michael Chabon, Kathryn Harrison, Frank McCourt, Isabel Allende, and Francine du Plessix Gray. Elizabeth Gilbert's essay "The Road to Rapture," published in Allure in 2003, was the precursor to her 2006 memoir, Eat, Pray, Love (Viking Adult). Photographers who have shot for Allure include Michael Thompson, Mario Testino, Patrick Demarchelier, Norman Jean Roy, Tina Barney, Marilyn Minter, Carter Smith, Steven Klein, Steven Meisel, and Helmut Newton.

== Best of Beauty Awards ==
Allure began its Best of Beauty awards program in the mid-1990s, at the initiative of Wells, to help readers choose among the vast array of makeup, skincare, and hair-care products on the market. In 2019, the magazine introduced the Allure Best of Beauty Clean Seal award to products that met the publication's "clean" standards.

Allure has two sets of awards, one judged by the magazine's editors and the other by readers. A "winners' seal" logo, developed by Allure, appears on many of the winning products. To ensure that its judgments are neutral, Allure's ad department isn't involved in the selections.

In 2010, the magazine developed an iPhone app that highlights the winning products and tells users where they can buy them based on their location.

== Controversy ==
The magazine faced online criticism when it showed Marissa Neitling with an Afro haircut.

Singer Halsey has announced she will no longer do press after Allure failed to use her preferred pronouns in its August 2021 cover story and promoted the interview by allegedly taking quotes out of context.

== Awards (for Allure) ==
- Magazine of the Year from Adweek (2017)
- Bronze Clio Award for Allure Unbound augmented reality app (2017)
- The National Magazine Award for Design (1994)
- The Editorial Excellence Award from Folio (2001)
- The Circulation Excellence Award from Circulation Management (2001)
- "Ring Leader", an essay by Natalie Kusz from the February 1996 issue of Allure, was selected for The Best American Essays 1997 (Houghton Mifflin).
- The magazine has been on Adweek’s Hot List in 1993, 1994, 1995, 2003, and 2007.
- Allure has received 29 awards from the American Academy of Dermatology, nine journalism awards from The Fragrance Foundation, and the Excellence in Media Award from the Skin Cancer Foundation.

== Awards (for Linda Wells) ==
- The Achiever Award from Cosmetic Executive Women (2001)
- The Matrix Award for magazine leadership from New York Women in Communications, Inc. (2009)

== Awards (for Michelle Lee) ==
- Editor of the Year from Adweek (2017)
- Digiday's Glossy 50 (2017)
- A100 Most Influential Asians from Gold House (2018)
- Creative 100 from Create & Cultivate (2017)

== In the media ==
Wells, along with Allure editors Michael Carl and Kelly Atterton, have appeared as judges on the Bravo TV series Shear Genius.

Allure editors have appeared as experts on television programs such as the Today show and 60 Minutes, and Allure stories frequently receive national attention.

Hilary Duff played an Allure intern in Cheaper by the Dozen 2.

== See also ==
- List of Allure cover models
- List of Allure Editor
