= Couples Retreat =

2009 film by Peter Billingsley

- Theatrical release poster
- Directed by: Peter Billingsley
- Written by: Jon Favreau; Vince Vaughn; Dana Fox
- Produced by: Scott Stuber; Vince Vaughn
- Starring: Vince Vaughn; Jason Bateman; Jon Favreau; Faizon Love; Kristin Davis; Malin Åkerman; Kristen Bell; Jean Reno
- Cinematography: Eric Edwards
- Edited by: Dan Lebental; Pietro Scalia
- Music by: A. R. Rahman
- Production companies: Universal Pictures; Wild West Picture Show Productions; Stuber Productions
- Distributed by: Universal Pictures
- Release date: October 9, 2009
- Running time: 113 minutes
- Country: United States
- Language: English
- Budget: $60–70 million
- Box office: $172.4 million

Couples Retreat is a 2009 American comedy film directed by Peter Billingsley and written by Jon Favreau, Vince Vaughn, and Dana Fox. Vaughn and Favreau star with Jason Bateman, Faizon Love, Kristin Davis, Malin Åkerman, Kristen Bell, and Jean Reno. In the film, four couples vacationing on a tropical island quickly discover that their beach getaway destination is all about marriage therapy, where the workshop sessions are mandatory.

The film was primarily shot on the French Polynesian island of Bora Bora. Universal Pictures released Couples Retreat on October 9, 2009. It received negative reviews from critics and grossed $172 million during its theatrical run.

== Plot ==
Dave, a dealer for Guitar Hero, and Ronnie, a stay-at-home mom, are a typical couple raising two young children in the suburbs of Chicago. They experience various stresses including redecorating their house and raising their kids. Joey and Lucy are high school sweethearts with a smart but naive teenage daughter named Lacey. Their relationship is on the rocks and they are even considering a divorce once Lacey goes off to college. Jason and Cynthia are a neurotic couple who've experienced multiple failed attempts to conceive, and Shane, recently separated (but not legally and officially divorced), has a much younger girlfriend, Trudy.

At Dave's son's birthday party, Jason and Cynthia, using a PowerPoint presentation, announce their troubled marriage and are considering divorce as they cannot have a baby. As a last-ditch effort, they have found a couples therapy resort named Eden. A deal called the Pelican Package is half the normal cost if they can get three other couples to join them. In their presentation, they show photos of sunlit beaches and beautiful locations. They assure the others that the couples therapy is purely optional.

Dave and Ronnie insist they can't go because of their children, declining the trip. In the middle of the night, Jason sets off their alarm to try to sell the idea of the retreat. The commotion wakes the kids, who overheard their parents' conversations of not being able to go because of them. Fearing their parents are contemplating divorce, the kids have already arranged for Dave's father, Grandpa Jim-Jim to babysit so their parents can go to Eden.

The retreat proves to be divided into Eden West and Eden East. West is for couples and uses the tagline "Stay Together". East is for singles and uses the tagline "Come Together". East and West attendees are not allowed to intermingle.

Upon arrival at Eden West, the four couples are shown their villas. At dinner, resort host Sctanley informs them 6 a.m. couples therapy, is mandatory. If any couple fails to attend, it will be taken as an indication that they want to leave, and a refund for Eden will be given, although not for their airfare. The group debates what to do. After an indulgent dinner with many delicacies, they decide to put up with "a couple of hours" of therapy in order to enjoy the other amenities of the resort.

In the morning, each couple meets with an assigned therapist. All four couples are told they have problems, even Ronnie and Dave, who thought they were fine. They endure resort owner Marcel's unusual methods, including swimming with and feeding lemon sharks and yoga sessions with amorous instructor Salvadore.

On the fourth night, Trudy escapes to Eden East. The other seven, encouraged by Joey, leave to find her. After Cynthia and Jason argue, the men and women split up. As they try to find their way to the resort, the men end up arguing and pointing out the problems with each other's marriages.

The women run into Salvadore who takes them to Eden East. The men find the staff lounge where they find Sctanley playing Guitar Hero. He threatens to report them to Marcel, but Dave challenges him to the game (without telling Sctanley that he has helped produce the game). Sctanley, after losing the wager, directs them to Eden East, even though he knows he was tricked by Dave.

When they arrive, Dave realizes what a good thing he has with Ronnie. He goes with her to be alone at a waterfall. Joey finds Lucy with Salvadore and knocks him out, reuniting with her. Cynthia and Jason share drinks and end up becoming intimate. Shane runs into his ex-wife, Jennifer, who admits she still loves him. Shane tells Trudy to remain in Eden East and enjoy being single, then leaves with Jennifer. All four couples return to Eden West.

== Cast ==
- Vince Vaughn and Malin Åkerman as Dave and Ronnie, a typical suburban couple with two children. Their marriage seems fine, but both realize that Dave tends to undermine Ronnie by crossing emotional boundaries and blocking her needs due to his exhausting work. At the conclusion of their therapy, Marcel grants them the ass as their animal spirit because they are both stubborn, and they bear the burden of not only their troubles but also those of others.
- Jason Bateman and Kristen Bell as Jason and Cynthia Smith, a troubled couple whose idea it was to go to Eden with their friends. Their issues stem from a lack of communication complicated with Jason's more controlling methods and their trouble with conceiving a baby. They are a very organized couple and are the most interested in repairing their relationship. Marcel grants them a rabbit token after they reunite, due to their innate ability to overcome any obstacles that stand in their way.
- Jon Favreau and Kristin Davis as Joey and Lucy Tanzini, high school sweethearts that have fallen apart due to their belief that they "missed out" on living after high school, having been married and becoming parents immediately after and are contemplating getting a divorce as soon as their daughter goes off to college. They have a daughter named Lacey who is a smart but somewhat rebellious teen. After reuniting in therapy, Marcel gives them a wolf spirit token as they are pack animals but their hearts always lie with their destined mate.
- Faizon Love and Kali Hawk as Shane and Trudy, a completely polar opposite couple. Trudy and Shane soon tire of each other due to their differences in age and interests. Trudy goes off to the local single scene, and while attempting to find her and bring her back, Shane and his wife Jennifer reconcile instead. They are given the token of the honeybee to symbolize that while they may visit other flowers from time to time, nothing is as sweet as returning to their hive.
- Temuera Morrison as Briggs, the native assistant to Marcel - his name is misspelt as Temeura in the opening credits
- Jean Reno as Marcel, the lead therapist, founder and operator of the resort
- Peter Serafinowicz as Sctanley (pronounced Stanley, with a silent "c"), the British manager of the resort who oversees the couples' stay and was the original scoring champion of Guitar Hero on the island. (Vaughn's DVD commentary explains the silent "c" as simple fun.)
- Carlos Ponce as Salvadore, the yoga instructor
- Tasha Smith as Jennifer, ex-wife of Shane
- John Michael Higgins as Robert John, the therapist of Dave and Ronnie
- Jonna Walsh as Lacey Tanzini
- Ken Jeong as Wardo, the therapist of Jason and Cynthia
- Amy Hill as Jean, the therapist of Shane and Trudy
- Karen David as Spa Attendant

Vince Vaughn's real-life father, Vernon Vaughn, plays his on-screen father.

== Production ==
=== Filming ===
The primary location for filming was at the St. Regis Bora Bora Resort, Bora Bora in French Polynesia. Other filming locations included Universal Studios in Los Angeles and O'Hare International Airport.

== Release ==
=== Marketing ===
Universal Pictures was criticized for removing actors Faizon Love and Kali Hawk from the international posters for the film, showing only six rather than the eight cast members used for the U.S. promotional materials. The studio said it regretted causing offense and has abandoned plans to use the revised poster in other countries. In 2020, Faizon Love filed a lawsuit accusing Universal of race discrimination and whitewashing for continued use of the offending poster.

Universal Pictures partnered with various groups for financial support to help market the film. Sponsors include the Tourism Board of Tahiti where the film was made, the manufacturers of Bud Light and Captain Morgan's Rum, Bloomingdale's department store, and Crunch Gyms. The video game Guitar Hero is also prominently featured in the film.

== Reception ==
=== Box office ===
The film was a box office success, ranking first for its opening weekend grossing $34,286,740 and becoming Vince Vaughn's highest box office success since 2006's The Break-Up. The film grossed $109.2 million domestically and $58.8 million in other markets for a worldwide total of $171 million.

=== Critical response ===
Couples Retreat was panned by critics. The review aggregation website Rotten Tomatoes reported that out of 161 critic reviews, 10% of them were positive, with an average rating of 3.8/10. The site's consensus states: "Despite a talented cast and some reliably pleasant interplay between Jon Favreau and Vince Vaughn, Couples Retreat leaves viewers stranded in an arid, mirthless comedy." Metacritic assigned the film a weighted average score of 23 out of 100, based on 27 reviews, indicating "generally unfavorable" reviews. Audiences polled by CinemaScore gave the film an average grade of "B" on an A+ to F scale.

Roger Ebert gave the film 2 out of 4 stars. He criticized the formulaic story and lack of character specifics, but said, "Vaughn's well-timed and smart dialogue" is one of the better parts of the film. James Berardinelli wrote: "Despite being mediocre and largely forgettable, Couples Retreat is not unpleasant, although it's easier to recommend it for home viewing than for a trip to a theater." Dennis Harvey of Variety wrote: "Film has some bright ideas and an appealing cast that only fly so high due to pedestrian execution." Claudia Puig of USA Today described it as "Tedious, unromantic, sophomoric and only sporadically funny."

=== Lawsuit ===
Irina Krupnik, a former model, filed a $10 million misappropriation-of-likeness invasion-of-privacy lawsuit, naming several defendants including the producers of Couples Retreat arising from a purported masturbation scene in which actor Jon Favreau uses a photo of her. Manhattan Supreme Court Judge O. Peter Sherwood ruled against Krupnik, and she received nothing.

== Music ==
The soundtrack for Couples Retreat was released on October 6, 2009, by Relativity Music Group, and featured many of the songs used in the film.
