= Hi, Infidelity =

- Veronica Mars episode
- Episode no.: Season 3 Episode 6
- Directed by: Michael Fields
- Written by: John Enbom
- Production code: 3T5806
- Original air date: November 7, 2006
- Running time: 42 minutes

Guest appearances
- Laura San Giacomo as Harmony Chase; Robert Ri'chard as Mason; Chastity Dotson as Nish Sweeney; Patrick Fabian as Hank Landry; James Jordan as Tim Foyle; Ryan Devlin as Mercer Hayes; Krista Kalmus as Claire Nordhouse; Adam Rose as Max; Matt McKenzie as Tom Barry; Michael B. Silver as David Winkler; Jaime Ray Newman as Mindy O'Dell; Ed Begley, Jr. as Cyrus O'Dell

Episode chronology
← Previous "President Evil"	Next → "Of Vice and Men"
- Veronica Mars season 3

"Hi, Infidelity" is the sixth episode of the third season of the American mystery television series Veronica Mars, and the fiftieth episode overall. Written by John Enbom and directed by Michael Fields, the episode premiered on The CW on November 17, 2006.

The series depicts the adventures of Veronica Mars (Kristen Bell) as she deals with life as a college student while moonlighting as a private detective. In this episode, Veronica investigates an accusation that she plagiarized a criminology paper only to find out that her teacher is having an affair with Mindy O'Dell (Jamie Ray Newman). Meanwhile, Stosh "Piz" Piznarski (Chris Lowell) invites Veronica to go bowling, and Wallace Fennel (Percy Daggs III) must choose between basketball and his studies.

The episode features the return of Laura San Giacomo as Harmony Chase and the return of the recurring character of Max (Adam Rose). San Giacomo and Colantoni, who had previously co-starred on the sitcom Just Shoot Me!, lobbied for more storylines together after rekindling their friendship during production of "Charlie Don't Surf", her first appearance. Rose's character had been planned to begin a later romantic relationship with Mac since the writing of this episode and went on to fulfill this role in several future episodes. At the time of its initial broadcast, the episode was watched by 2.75 million people and received mixed to positive reviews from television critics.

== Plot ==
Following the events of the previous episode, Veronica confronts Claire Nordhouse (Krista Kalmus) for faking her rape after she publishes a story on it. Wallace Fennel and his chemical engineering professor are taken in to Dean O’Dell’s (Ed Begley, Jr.) office, where he is brought for cheating on a test. Veronica’s criminology paper is praised by her teacher, Hank (Patrick Fabian) leading her to praise him incessantly. Harmony Chase (Laura San Giacomo), a former client who asked Keith Mars (Enrico Colantoni) to investigate her possibly adulterous husband, calls him and asks him on a date. Tim Foyle (James Jordan), Hank's teaching assistant, tells Veronica that she plagiarized her paper, even though she did not. Hank gives her three days to prove that she is innocent. Veronica learns that a student named Jeff Ratner accused her. Veronica goes to a computer student and ascertains the email address of the person who faked her paper. Stosh "Piz" Piznarski invites Veronica bowling, and she invites Parker (Julie Gonzalo) as well.

Veronica gets caught snooping in the Dean’s office, although she makes up a hasty lie that she was searching for a lost earring, and it diverts his attention. Wallace decides not to drop the class on whose test he cheated. Veronica proves that the essay hers was supposedly plagiarized from was posted after she turned in her paper; nevertheless, she still wants to find who framed her. Parker, Veronica, Piz, and Logan (Jason Dohring) bowl and have fun together. When Veronica and Logan get room service, Veronica spots Jeff Ratner and questions him. Parker is romantically interested in Piz, and she tasks Veronica with talking to him about her. After talking to Mercer Hayes (Ryan Devlin), Parker informs Veronica that she remembers Mercer's cologne from the night of her rape. Veronica goes to Sheriff Lamb (Michael Muhney) with this news; Wallace drops basketball to study for the class. Veronica runs into Keith at the hotel before learning that the room that belongs to "Rory Finch" is actually Hank, who is having an affair with Mrs. O’Dell.

On their second date, Harmony suggests that they have sex, but Keith declines the proposal. On the way back, Keith’s becomes involved in a traffic collision, but the airbag catches him. This traumatic experience makes him go back to Harmony, and they sleep together. Veronica talks to Tim Foyle, who made her follow the trail of "Rory Finch" deliberately in order for her to discover the professor’s affair. Tim was the professor’s protégé, and he wants Veronica to discover Hank's flaws before she becomes more involved with him. Logan runs up to Veronica and tells her that Mercer has been arrested for the rapes on campus, despite the fact that he believes that Mercer is innocent. Logan begs Veronica to defend Mercer, as he was with him the night of one of the rapes. However, he refuses to tell Veronica what they were doing.

== Production ==
"Hi, Infidelity" was written by John Enbom and directed by Michael Fields, marking Enbom's twelfth writing credit and Fields's sixth directing credit for the series. The episode features the second of three appearances by Laura San Giacomo as Harmony Chase. She and Enrico Colantoni had become friends when they co-starred on the sitcom Just Shoot Me!. They rekindled their friendship during production of "Charlie Don't Surf", San Giacomo's first appearance, so they lobbied for more storylines together. Thomas was open to the possibility, saying, "I wouldn't hesitate to go back to this, because I was really happy with how it played out."

Adam Rose made his second appearance in this episode as a suspect; he would make appearances later in the season as well. From the very beginning of his appearances, Rose's character, Max, was planned to begin a romantic relationship with Mac (Tina Majorino). Rose was roommates with Michael Mitchell, who played Bronson, another love interest for Mac. When Rose received the call that he would have a romantic storyline with Mac, he reportedly stated, "but I thought that's what my roommate was doing."

== Reception ==
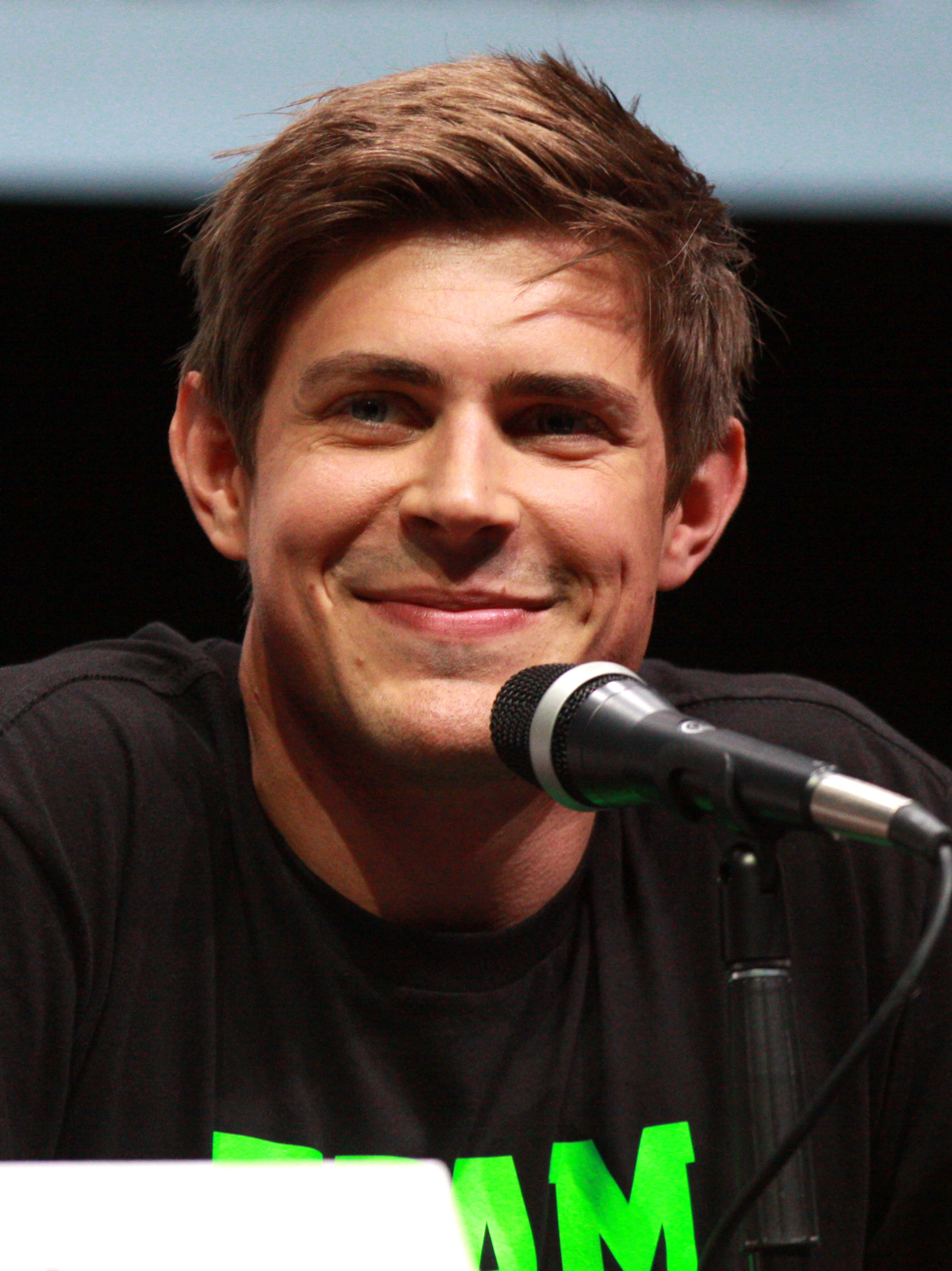
Several reviewers praised the increased role of Piz (Chris Lowell, pictured) in the episode.

=== Ratings ===
At the time of its initial broadcast, "Hi, Infidelity" was viewed by 2.75 million people, ranking 94th out of 97 in the weekly rankings.

=== Reviews ===
Eric Goldman of IGN gave the episode a 7.8 out of 10, indicating that it was "good", but his review was mixed. Comparing it with the rest of the season, he opined that it suffered from some of the same problems of previous episodes. He thought that the actions of many of the characters in "Hi, Infidelity" were out of character or unrealistic. While writing that "the rape storyline is still not feeling nearly as weighty as it should," he praised the development of the rape mystery for hinting that there were larger forces at work. Price Peterson of TV.com gave a positive review, praising the case-of-the-week's emotional connection to Veronica for "[raising] the stakes" and Piz's increased role. He also believed that all the series regulars, excluding Wallace, had an important and interesting role to play. Television Without Pity gave the episode an "A", which is one of its highest ratings given for the season.

Alan Sepinwall praised the episode compared to the first few episodes of the season, writing it balanced Veronica's character traits well, including her jealousy and generosity. He also wrote that it showed her as a character with some "baser instincts", giving the scene with Jeff as an example. Rowan Kaiser, writing for The A.V. Club, gave a mixed review. The reviewer was very critical of what she called the "'radical feminist fakes her own rape'" storyline, but she praised the episode as the first one of the third season to make the college setting feel natural. Although he thought that the case-of-the-week contributed to his overall positive view of the episode, he thought that "it's mostly the little things that make it work", pointing out Piz's increased role as an example.
