= Spit & Eggs =

- Veronica Mars episode
- Veronica grabs a plastic unicorn to attack the Hearst rapist. The scene featured 27 different camera angles, one of which was under the bed. In addition, the scene featured toy unicorns in various incarnations, which was based on an in-joke among the cast and crew.
- Episode no.: Season 3 Episode 9
- Directed by: Rob Thomas
- Written by: Rob Thomas
- Production code: 3T5809
- Original air date: November 28, 2006

Guest appearances
- Ryan Devlin as Mercer Hayes; David Tom as Chip Diller; Andrew McClain as Moe Slater; James Jordan as Tim Foyle; Patrick Fabian as Professor Hank Landry; Jaime Ray Newman as Mindy O'Dell; Chastity Dotson as Nish Sweeney; Jeremy Roberts as Mel Stoltz; Krista Kalmus as Claire Nordhouse; Charlie Koznick as Andrew "Drew" Barndale; Ed Begley, Jr. as Dean Cyrus O'Dell

Episode chronology
← Previous "Lord of the Pi's"	Next → "Show Me the Monkey"
- Veronica Mars season 3

"Spit & Eggs" is the ninth episode of the third season of the American mystery television series Veronica Mars, and the fifty-third episode overall. Written and directed by series creator Rob Thomas, the episode premiered on November 28, 2006, on The CW. The series depicts the adventures of Veronica Mars (Kristen Bell) as she deals with life as a college student while moonlighting as a private detective.

In this episode, when the Greek system at Hearst College is suddenly reinstated, Veronica enlists the help of her friends in patrolling a party to look for date rape drugs. Eventually, she learns the identity of the Hearst serial rapist and puts herself in danger to catch him. In addition, Dean O'Dell (Ed Begley, Jr.) acts increasingly erratically before he mysteriously appears dead in his office with a gunshot wound to the head. Meanwhile, Veronica and Logan (Jason Dohring) both deal with the emotional aftereffects of O'Dell's death.

"Spit & Eggs" was the second episode to be both written and directed by Thomas, who included several camera and prop changes that were not originally in the script. Series regular Tina Majorino returns to the series beginning in this episode after an absence since "My Big Fat Greek Rush Week", a hiatus which was due to her filming Big Love. In addition, during production, the crew decided to change their narrative plan for the season, maintaining two of the shorter story arcs but removing the planned third.

The episode was viewed by 3.44 million viewers in its initial airing, a series high. The episode received critical acclaim, with many critics praising the return of Mac and the increased role of peripheral characters, the resolution to the rape mystery, and the setup of the next major story arc. Eric Goldman of IGN praised the various plotlines converging, while Rowan Kaiser of The A.V. Club wrote that the plot twist "plays on everyone's expectations."

== Plot synopsis ==
Beginning in medias res, while Piz (Chris Lowell) and Mac (Tina Majorino) are at a party, a bloodied Veronica stumbles to Piz's door and collapses. The episode flashes back to two days earlier. As the Lilith House celebrates the end of the Greek system, Logan (Jason Dohring) abruptly breaks up with Veronica. Weevil helps Dean O'Dell (Ed Begley, Jr.) fix his TV. A man comes into the Dean's office and implicitly threatens to remove his funding if the Greek system stays closed. The Dean hires Keith (Enrico Colantoni) to track his wife, and Veronica sobs in the shower due to her breakup with Logan. The Dean unexpectedly reinstates the Greek system, to the delight of Dick (Ryan Hansen). The Dean and Veronica spot a classified ad that states that a mysterious person will find his next victim at a party. After receiving an A on her paper, she visits Tim Foyle (James Jordan) and sees an investigation board. Veronica enlists Wallace (Percy Daggs III), Piz, and Mac for help in investigating an upcoming Pi Sig party.

At the party, Veronica notices that the "rape coasters" being handed out at the party, which are supposed to test for date rape drugs, do not actually work. Veronica, Mac, and Piz test various peoples' cups using working coasters they'd acquired from Parker (Julie Gonzalo) earlier and find nothing. After Keith tells Dean O'Dell that his wife is cheating on him with Veronica's criminology professor, the Dean gets drunk, and Keith leaves him to sleep it off. Once Keith leaves, however, the Dean rifles through his desk and pulls out a gun. Wallace and Piz find a drink that tested positive for GHB, and Wallace and Logan dash to the off-campus apartment of the girl whose name is written on the cup. Dean O'Dell finds and enters into the room in which his wife and the criminology professor are carrying on their affair as Veronica learns that they have tracked the wrong girl. Just as Mercer (Ryan Devlin) (the actual rapist) is about to rape his next victim, he abruptly learns that Veronica has changed places with his victim. Veronica tases Mercer, and they have a quick fight before Veronica escapes. She is let into Moe's (Andrew McClain) room.

Moe hands Veronica a drink. Immediately after discovering a picture of Mercer and Moe, Veronica experiences the effects of a date rape drug. She hides in the closet and struggles to remain conscious. Mercer and Moe enter the room and are about to miss her, but Veronica's cell phone rings and they knock her out. Parker calls attention to Mercer. In addition to a bomb threat against Hearst, Dean O'Dell notices his window being egged before a mysterious man enters and the Dean asks "What are you doing here?" Keith arrests Mercer and Moe. Logan intentionally gets himself arrested so he can go into the cell with Mercer and Moe. The Dean is found dead in his office in the morning from a bullet wound to the head.

== Production ==
=== Development ===
The episode was written and directed by series creator Rob Thomas, marking his seventh writing credit and second and final directing credit for the series (after "Donut Run"). Starting with this episode, Thomas and the crew's plan for the season changed—while they had initially scheduled three major story arcs for the season, this number was now bumped down to two, while the last few episodes would be standalone. The creative team decided that their choices for major mysteries had not worked since season one; Thomas elaborated, "One feeling is that the big mysteries keep away the casual TV viewers, and the other is the thing that has been the least successful since season one […] the big mysteries." Thomas also recalled that his major design for the first season that was because Lilly had been murdered, everyone had a stake in the solving of the mystery and that the crew were finding it impossible to keep the same amount of emotional involvement since the first season; Thomas thought that the new format would be a way of trying to return to a more emotionally driven format.

In addition, Thomas turned what was scheduled to be the third major mystery into a two-episode storyline, with the last five episodes of the season being stand-alone. He stated, "It seems like a good time to do it—a good fun test balloon." Nevertheless, he confirmed that there would be ongoing stories in Veronica's personal life. A week prior to the episode's airing, Michael Ausiello received an advance screening of the episode, revealing several details that the network allowed him to divulge.

=== Writing and directing ===
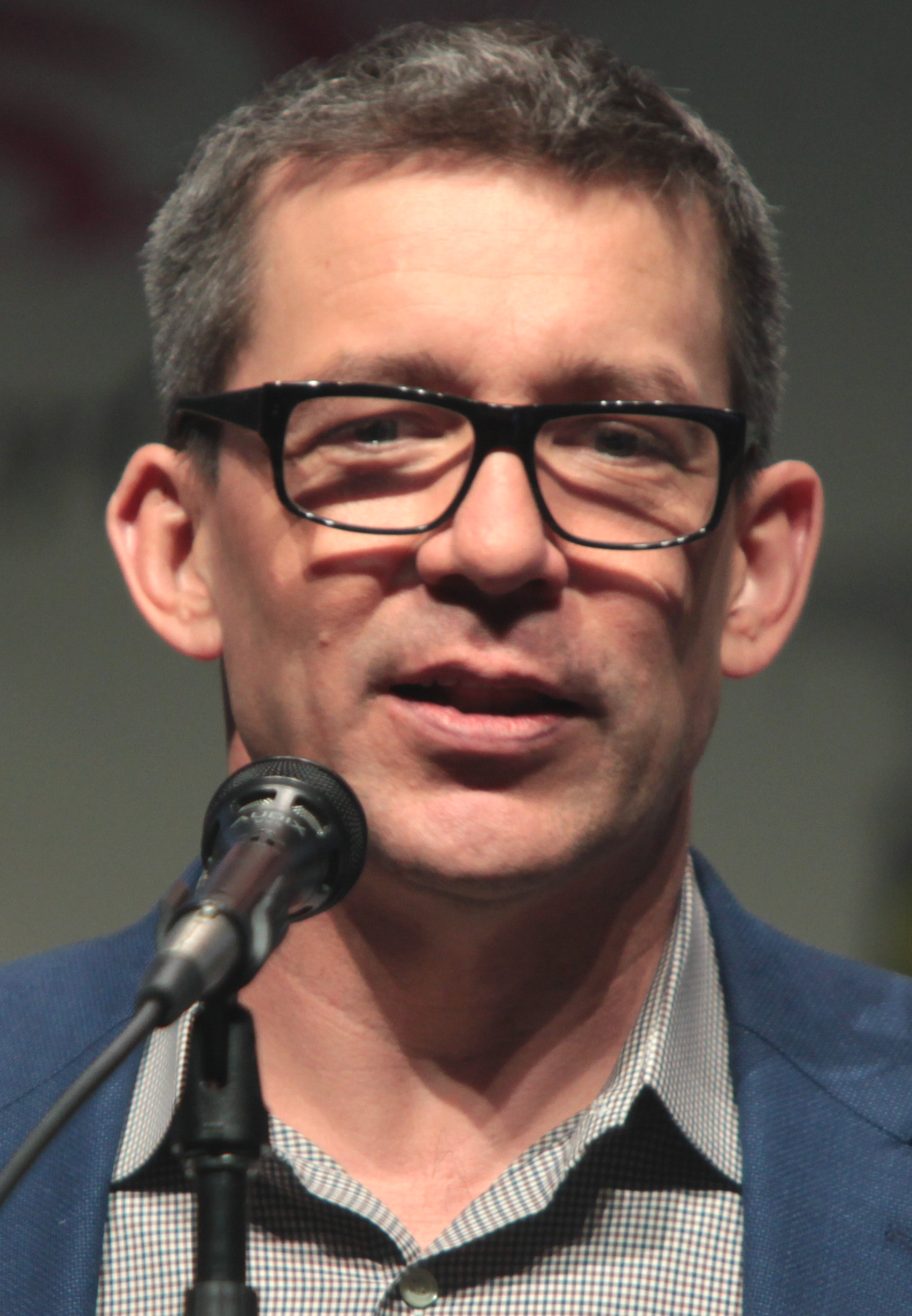
Series creator Rob Thomas wrote and directed the episode.

On the Season Three DVD Commentary, Thomas remarks on his experience directing "Spit & Eggs" and shares his thoughts on several scenes of the episode. He called the scene in which Mercer attacks Veronica the one he was "happiest with for any number of reasons." The scene was shot with 27 camera angles, the most for any Veronica Mars episode, and it took 10 or 11 hours to film. The scene also features a number of fake unicorns in various forms; unicorns were an in-joke among the cast and crew after one season 2 script involved Veronica calling a store "Unicornicopia." While directing the scene, Thomas wanted to find an unusual weapon to be used, and "a unicorn struck [him] as funny." The scene in which Moe removes the unicorn horn from Mercer's leg was initially intended to be Moe bandaging Mercer, but Thomas thought that the final product would be more "interesting" while preparing for the scene.

Thomas included Piz dancing humorously at the fraternity party because he "could watch it over and over", and there were roughly fifteen minutes of footage of him dancing. The band that plays at the party, the Diamond Smugglers, is from Thomas's hometown of Austin, Texas, and they played at Thomas's wedding and 40th birthday party. The scene near the end with Logan smashing a police car to get intentionally thrown in prison confused the crew, who doubted its artistic and technical plausibility. However, Thomas was pleased with the final output, and producer Dan Etheridge called it "one of the most compact and interesting visual storytelling pieces in the episode." The episode went over budget. In this episode, Mac wears a shirt that says "Ask Me About My STD", something which several critics commended for its comedic value. Thomas came up with the idea for the shirt and hired one of the other guest actors in the scene for another episode, commenting "It's funny, I actually made that up, and I now have one, too." In addition, because Thomas was so pleased with the acting in the scene from the boy who hands Mac a whiskey, he hired the actor for a role in a subsequent episode as an important witness to Dean O'Dell's death.

=== Acting ===
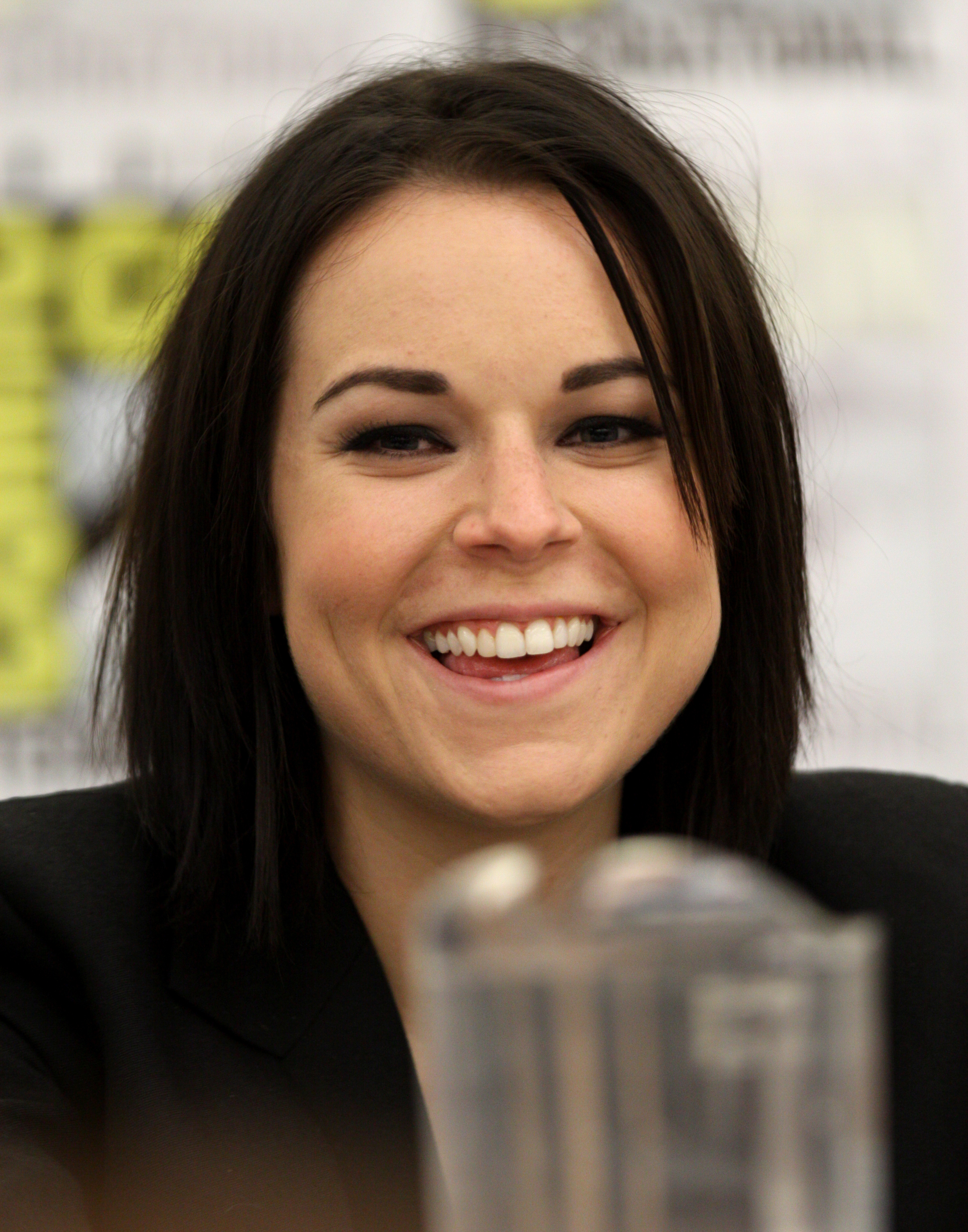
Series regular Tina Majorino returns after an absence of six episodes.

"Spit & Eggs" features the return of series regular Tina Majorino, who plays Mac on the show, after an absence of six episodes. Majorino had not appeared since the second episode of the season, "My Big Fat Greek Rush Week". At the time, Majorino was also a series regular on the HBO series Big Love, so her schedule was difficult to determine. She stated: "It's a little tough, but Big Love and Veronica Mars have both been really great about juggling the schedule so I could do both shows." On October 24, 2006, the cast and crew were filming the episode. Because of this other commitment, Majorino appeared in eleven episodes of the season instead of the scheduled twelve. On that same date, Majorino revealed that she would be returning in "Spit & Eggs", that it resolved the Hearst rapist storyline, and that it would introduce the show's next major story arc. On her role in the episode and in the season as a whole in light of the events in the second season finale, Majorino commented, "It's not like all of the sudden she's over everything that happened."

"Spit & Eggs" features the reveal that Mercer Hayes, played by Ryan Devlin, is the Hearst serial rapist. Devlin was unaware that he would be the perpetrator until reading the episode's script; he stated, "To tell you the truth, I'm not even sure the writers knew where my story was headed. But I was happy to do it – it's way more fun being bad than good!" The episode also marks the final appearance by Ed Begley, Jr., after his character is killed. The mystery surrounding his murder would be the next major story arc.

== Reception ==
In its original broadcast, the episode received 3.44 million viewers, marking a series high and ranking 88th of 97 in the weekly rankings. Thomas was very pleased by the ratings.

The episode received critical acclaim, with many critics praising the return of Mac and the increased role of peripheral characters, the resolution to the rape mystery, and the setup of the next major story arc. Eric Goldman of IGN gave the episode an 8 out of 10, indicating that it was "great". He wrote that "Spit & Eggs" was a welcome episode for longtime fans, as it involved several plots converging in a way that he found satisfactory. He praised the final few scenes, writing that the episode transitions well into the next mystery of Dean O'Dell's death by developing it slowly over the course of the season's prior episodes, but he was more mixed towards the reveal of Mercer as the rapist, commenting "the ultimate revelation can't help but be a little underwhelming, since not enough time has been spent on any of the credible suspects to really have a good handle on them or be invested in them one way or another." Rowan Kaiser, writing for The A.V. Club, who was quite critical of the rape storyline in earlier episodes, said that the conclusion made the storyline slightly better overall. She praised the double reveal of Mercer and Moe as accomplices, stating, "That twist overall is effective because it plays on everyone's expectations. The characters all believe there is a single culprit here. […] It makes the revelations more plausible, while also making the need for those revelations less intense (the two are related)."

Television Without Pity gave the episode a "B+". Alan Sepinwall, on his blog What's Alan Watching?, was also relatively positive towards the episode. While calling the reveal of the rapist "out of left field", he noted that there was some material in "My Big Fat Greek Rush Week" that pointed to this conclusion. In addition, he praised Parker rescuing Veronica and the start of the Dean O'Dell mystery, writing "Rob quite cleverly threw the start of the new mystery into the tail end of the first one." However, there were several plot issues that he found as well as that the nine-episode storyline didn't fully do the reveal justice, opining that Thomas and the crew had to rush to give the audience important information in this format. Cortney Martin of the Houston Chronicle enjoyed the major roles played by Wallace, Mac, Weevil, Piz, and Parker in the episode, writing "the show belongs to Veronica's sidekicks this week." Maureen Ryan of the Chicago Tribune gave praise as well. While being lukewarm regarding the season as a whole, she thought that "Spit & Eggs" was "appropriately suspenseful." In addition, she enjoyed that Veronica was less sarcastic and contemptuous in the episode, in contrast to previous episodes of the season.

Film.com praised the episode as well, lauding the in medias res opening scene, suspenseful tone, and Mac's reappearance, and the setup for the next mystery arc, among other aspects of the episode. Conversely, Keith McDuffee, writing for AOL TV, was more critical, calling it "way too fast for a partial season-ender", arguing that there were too many unanswered questions left after the episode's conclusion.
