= President Evil =

- Veronica Mars episode
- Episode no.: Season 3 Episode 5
- Directed by: Nick Marck
- Written by: Jonathan Moskin; David Mulei
- Production code: 3T5805
- Original air date: October 31, 2006

Guest appearances
- Robert Ri'chard as Mason; Dianna Agron as Jenny Budosh; Michael B. Silver as Professor David Winkler; James Jordan as Timothy Foyle; Ryan Devlin as Mercer Hayes; Daran Norris as Cliff McCormack; Blake Shields as Harrison; Ryan Pinkston as Danny Rossow; Krista Kalmus as Claire Nordhouse; Jaime Ray Newman as Mindy O'Dell; Richard Grieco as Steven Batando; Ed Begley, Jr. as Cyrus O'Dell

Episode chronology
← Previous "Charlie Don't Surf"	Next → "Hi, Infidelity"
- Veronica Mars season 3

"President Evil" is the fifth episode of the third season of the American mystery television series Veronica Mars, and the forty-ninth episode overall. Written by Jonathan Moskin and David Mulei and directed by Nick Marck, the episode premiered on The CW on October 31, 2006.

The series depicts the adventures of Veronica Mars (Kristen Bell) as she deals with life as a college student while moonlighting as a private detective. In this episode, Veronica investigates when two masked men rob a Halloween party and steal Veronica's necklace from Lilly Kane (Amanda Seyfried). Meanwhile, Keith (Enrico Colantoni) helps Dean O'Dell (Ed Begley, Jr.) find the biological father of his stepson, the only person who can give the stepson a life-saving bone marrow transplant.

Dianna Agron, Richard Grieco, Ryan Pinkston, and Robert Ri'chard guest star or make their first appearances as recurring characters in the episode. The episode received mixed reviews from television critics, with general praise towards Veronica and Weevil's relationship and criticism for the case of the week and the episode's ending.

== Synopsis ==
Veronica shows Claire, the most-recent rape victim (Krista Kalmus) the photo of a suspect, but she claims not to recognize him. In criminology class, Veronica does a case study of Weevil (Francis Capra), and the class enjoys it. After the study, Veronica tells Weevil that she's dating Logan (Jason Dohring), and he reacts negatively. Veronica then walks into Mars Investigations and finds Cyrus O'Dell and his wife (Jaime Ray Newman) talking with Keith, while Veronica herself does some detective work. Keith informs Veronica that Dean O'Dell's stepson is dying and that he wants Keith to find the boy's biological father. At Mercer's (Ryan Devlin) party, two masked men enter and steal everyone's valuables, including the necklace that Lilly gave Veronica. Wallace (Percy Daggs III) is failing his mechanical engineering class, a subject in which he wanted to major. Meanwhile, Keith tracks down the husband, and Veronica accuses Weevil of robbing the party.

At the meeting, Dean O'Dell's wife asks the ex-husband to give their son a bone marrow transplant. Meanwhile, Sheriff Lamb (Michael Muhney) arrests Weevil for the robbery. Veronica visits Weevil in prison before she decides to look into a pizza delivered to Weevil's house. Sheriff Lamb and a detective from the LAPD tell Keith that the ex-husband has disappeared before accusing Keith in the ex-husband's disappearance. Keith thinks that Dean O'Dell was involved in the disappearance, but when he visits Dean, it turns out that Dean's wife and stepson have disappeared to a hospital in Mexico, presumably taking the ex-husband with them. Wallace visits a "tutor", who charges him for a mysterious "study guide" before going back for the "answers." Veronica notices the masks being used in a short film, but they were stolen. When Keith and O'Dell are in Mexico, he reveals that he lied to Keith about their whereabouts and they were actually in a local hospital.

Veronica tracks the casino robber down to a volunteer police officer. She has evidence, and the police comes to arrest him, however, they don't find the necklace. At the hospital, Keith hesitates when O'Dell asks him what he would do to save Veronica. Veronica gets her necklace back from the perpetrator's daughter when she sees her wearing it. Because he gave bone marrow, the ex-husband now has a much more favorable divorce settlement. Wallace uses the answers he purchased and is called in to see the teacher after. Veronica tracks down the suspect in the photo with Claire, Wang Yi, but his roommate tells Veronica that he is Claire's boyfriend.

== Production ==
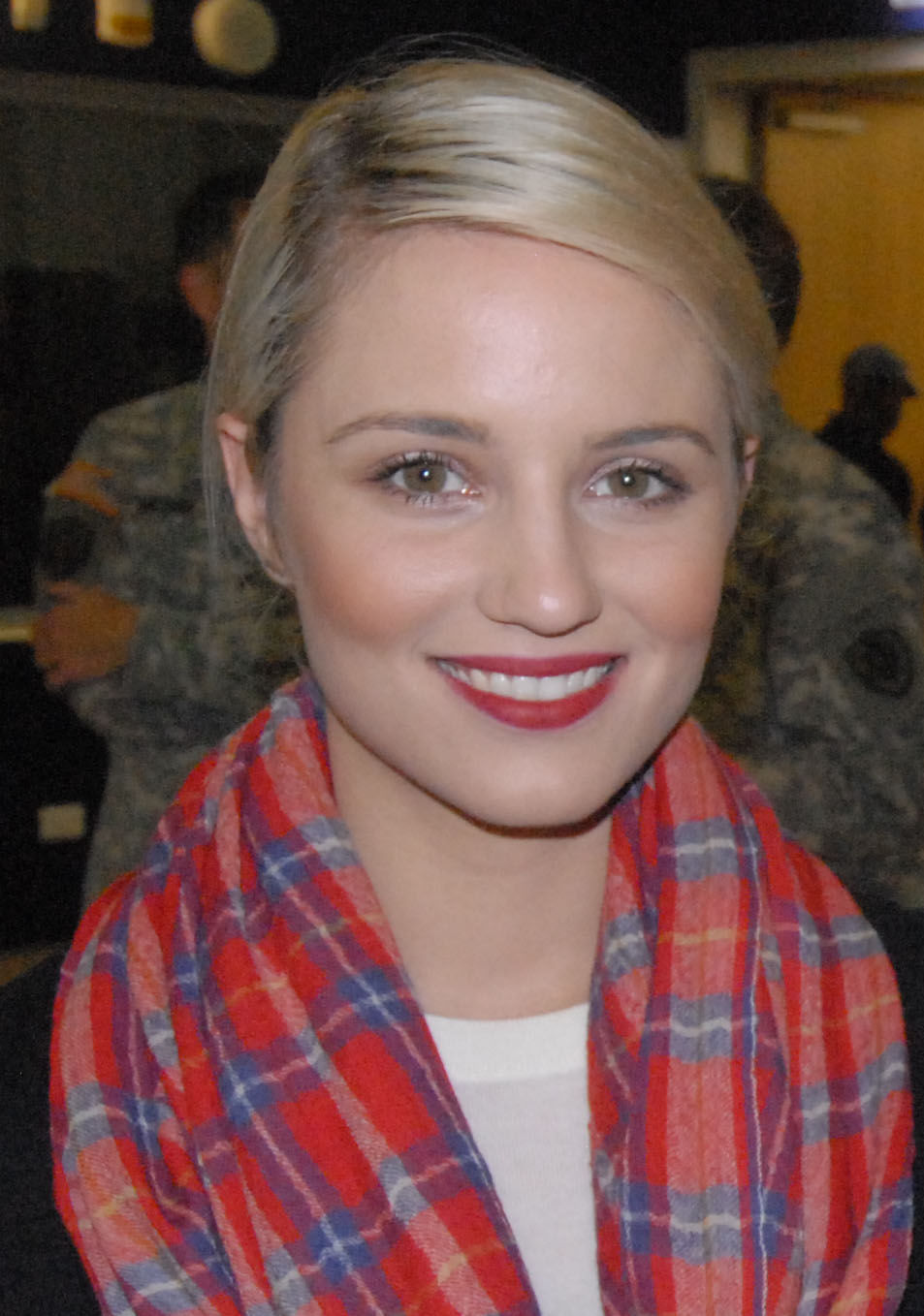
Dianna Agron made her first appearance in Veronica Mars in the episode.

"President Evil" was written by Jonathan Moskin and David Mulei and directed by Nick Marck, marking Moskin's first writing credit, Mulei's first writing credit for the show, and Marck's eighth directing credit for Veronica Mars. Dianna Agron, famous for her role as Quinn Fabray on Glee, makes her first appearance on the series in this episode as Jenny, Veronica's classmate. She would eventually appear on several episodes of the third season.

Richard Grieco, known for his role as Dennis Booker on the original 21 Jump Street TV series, appears for the first time as Steve Batando, Mindy O'Dell's ex-husband. In 2012, the New York Daily News called Grieco's role on Veronica Mars "his last mainstream role". Ryan Pinkston guest stars as Danny Rossow, a pizza shop employee. He would go on to make a guest appearance on series creator Rob Thomas's later show Party Down. Robert Ri'chard appears as Mason, Wallace's friend.

== Reception ==
=== Ratings ===
In its original broadcast, "President Evil" was viewed by 2.70 million viewers, ranking 99th of 101 in the weekly rankings. This figure was a decrease in 630,000 viewers from the previous episode, Charlie Don't Surf.

=== Reviews ===
The episode received mixed reviews from television critics. Eric Goldman, writing for IGN, gave a mostly positive review, giving it a 7.5 out of 10, indicating that it was a "good" episode. He stated, "Things are still a bit wobbly on Veronica Mars this season, though this episode had some elements that hopefully herald a turn in the right direction." While criticizing the case-of-the-week, he was more laudatory to the subplots, calling Sheriff Lamb arresting Weevil "the most entertaining scene of the episode" and that "the episode definitely picked up in the last act." Rowan Kaiser, writing for The A.V. Club, gave a very mixed review, commenting positively on Veronica and Weevil's relationship while criticizing other aspects of the episode. "While 'President Evil' was not a favorite, and has a few annoying moments, it was generally a perfectly adequate episode of Veronica Mars. That is, until the ending. […] The implication here is one that I've been dreading for a few episodes: that the radical feminist Lilith House has staged Claire's rape, and possibly others." Television Without Pity gave the episode a "B−".

Reviewer Alan Sepinwall also had mixed comments, comparing the episode to House and stating, "And yet as much as Veronica was annoying me, as much as I wanted to yell at her for automatically jumping to conclusions with Weevil (more on that in a minute), this was maybe my favorite episode of the season. […] Hell, they even had a cliffhanger ending to the mystery arc for the first time in forever. I dug it." Price Peterson of TV.com gave a mostly negative review, writing, "This episode was not the best! Not terrible by any means, but it felt lacking in certain ways, particularly when it came to the total lack of Piz and Dick. Where were they? Also this episode made it clear that Logan didn't have all that much to do on the show anymore."
