= Wichita Linebacker =

- Veronica Mars episode
- Episode no.: Season 3 Episode 3
- Directed by: Harry Winer
- Written by: Phil Klemmer; John Enbom
- Production code: 3T5803
- Original air date: October 17, 2006

Guest appearances
- Chastity Dotson as Nish Sweeney; Ryan Devlin as Mercer Hayes; Armie Hammer as Kurt Fenstermacher; Lindsey McKeon as Trish Vaughn; Erik Eidem as Larry; Krista Kalmus as Claire Nordhouse; Ed Begley, Jr. as Cyrus O'Dell

Episode chronology
← Previous "My Big Fat Greek Rush Week"	Next → "Charlie Don't Surf"
- Veronica Mars season 3

"Wichita Linebacker" is the third episode of the third season of the American mystery television series Veronica Mars, and the forty-seventh episode overall. Written by Phil Klemmer and John Enbom and directed by Harry Winer, the episode premiered on The CW on October 17, 2006.

The series depicts the adventures of Veronica Mars (Kristen Bell) as she deals with life as a college student while moonlighting as a private detective. In this episode, Veronica helps a football player, Kurt Fenstermacher (Armie Hammer) retrieve his stolen playbook. Meanwhile, Piz (Chris Lowell) gains a job at the college radio station, and Veronica meets Dean O'Dell (Ed Begley, Jr.) for the first time after she gets in trouble for events related to the events that occurred in the previous episode, "My Big Fat Greek Rush Week".

Phil Klemmer and John Enbom, the writers of the episode, found the episode difficult to write because they were not very familiar with American football. However, they decided to resolve the problem by making the episode as little about football as possible. "Wichita Linebacker" also features a guest appearance by Armie Hammer, as well as the first appearances by Begley, Jr. as Cyrus O'Dell and Ryan Devlin as Mercer Hayes. The episode received mixed to negative reviews, with criticism primarily focusing on the case of the week.

== Synopsis ==
Veronica watches a football practice before she expresses her frustration with Logan (Jason Dohring). Later, she meets Weevil (Francis Capra), who is working at a car wash. Veronica is called into Dean O'Dell's office, and he threatens her with expulsion if she does not give up some names in relation to the sorority marijuana scandal. Piz calls Veronica in to help a football player, Kurt Fenstermacher, retrieve his playbook, with Kurt's girlfriend, Trish (Lindsey McKeon) paying for the investigation. Veronica's only suggestion is that he gets a new one. Veronica convinces her father, Keith Mars (Enrico Colantoni), to hire Weevil as his new assistant at Mars Investigations. In an attempt to print a playbook for Kurt, Veronica disguises herself as a cheerleader, but fails to print one. After being called back into the Dean's office, Veronica is in the room during a debate between fraternity boys and feminists. Veronica goes back to the football player, and she hypothesizes that his girlfriend’s ex-boyfriend stole it. Weevil helps Keith at detective work, succeeding beyond Keith's expectations.

Veronica talks to the ex-boyfriend before learning that Kurt's best friend is probably guilty. Veronica gets a disturbing phone call from Logan, so she tracks his cell phone, finding him gambling. Veronica and Logan have a fight before she learns that Keith had to stop working for a client when Weevil hit a suspect; Keith feels required to fire Weevil. Veronica tells Weevil the news before she gives him a job fixing the Dean’s car. Veronica confronts the best friend, but he’s not the perpetrator, and Veronica suddenly realizes that Trish is. Veronica lies to Trish about what happened to Kurt in order to elicit a true reaction from her; this plan works, and Veronica learns that Trish took the playbook in order to get him off the team. However, she lost it in the process. Kurt, Trish, and Veronica track it down to the ex-boyfriend, who conspired with the best friend to give the plays to another team to spite the couple.

Veronica goes to Dean O’Dell and offers an exchange: Veronica tells him that his son spray-painted his car to conceal accident damage as vandalism, and he will drop the expulsion threat and hire Weevil--who will fix his car gratis--as the college's new maintenance guy. Veronica talks to the gambling owner, who acts strangely. Veronica tracks his car before removing the tracker later. Veronica talks to Trish, who says that Kurt left for Kansas. Weevil starts his new job as a Hearst janitor. Piz gets a job on a campus radio show, where he interviews both the feminists and the fraternity boys. In the middle of the show, the feminists get a text that says that Claire, the girl who the fraternity boys pointed out, was raped. Veronica and Logan reconcile their relationship and kiss.

== Production ==
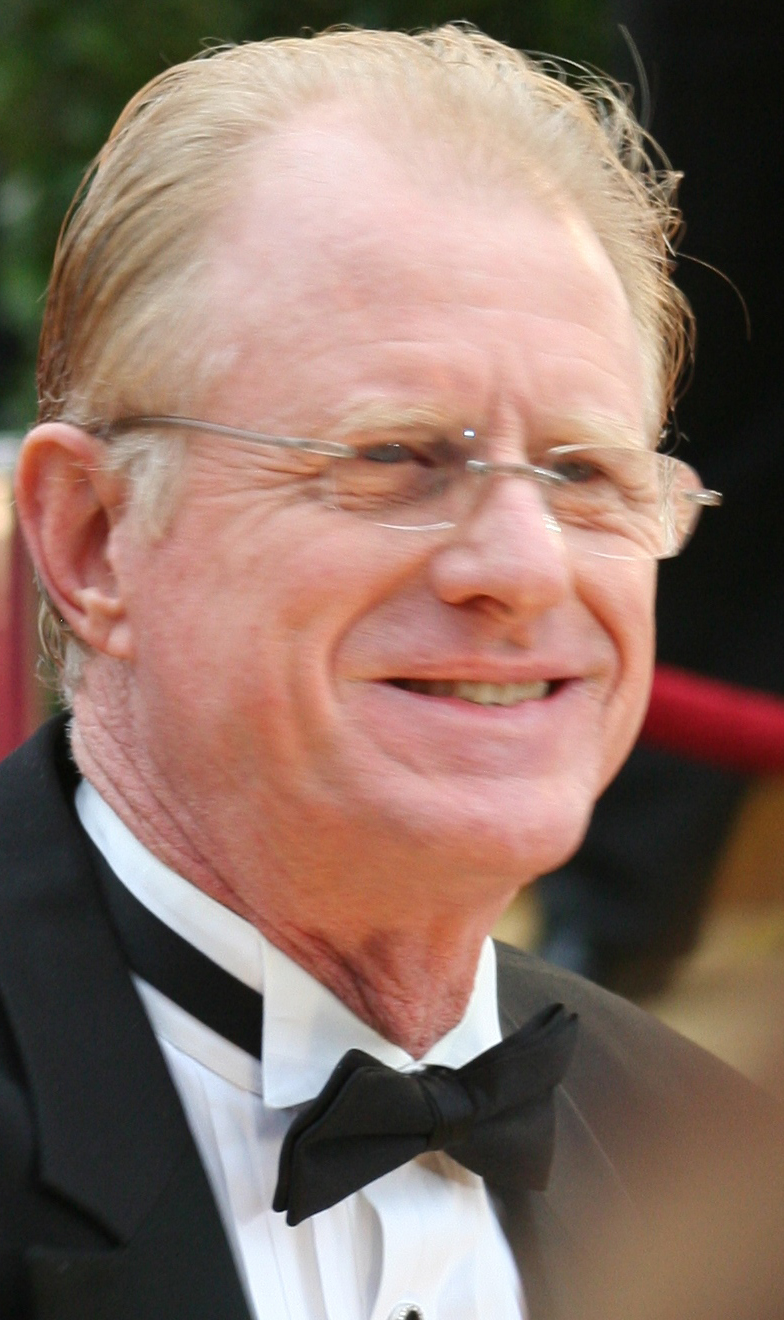
Ed Begley, Jr. makes his first appearance on the show in "Wichita Linebacker".

The episode was written by Phil Klemmer and John Enbom and directed by Harry Winer, marking both Klemmer and Enbom's eleventh writing credit, and Winer's third directing credit for the series. Klemmer and Enbom initially thought that they would be unable to write the episode because they didn't know very much about American football—so they tried to make the episode less about football. Enbom stated, "Rob just sort of handed [the episode] down. I think if you play strict attention, you'll find it isn't as footbally as an episode about a football player could possibly be. And I think that's why." The episode did not have the budget to hire a full football team, so several scenes were devoid of extras, including when Veronica meets one of the football players and when she breaks into the locker room.

The episode features the first appearance of Dean Cyrus O'Dell (Ed Begley, Jr.), a recurring character for the third season. Initially, Michael McKean was slated to take the role, but within twelve hours of accepting the part, McKean decided to pass on Veronica Mars altogether. Thomas called this "the most depressing casting news in the world." One week later, Begley accepted the role. Both actors had recently appeared in A Mighty Wind. "Wichita Linebacker" also includes a guest appearance by Armie Hammer, who plays Kurt Fenstermacher, the football player whose playbook is stolen. Ryan Devlin makes his first appearance as Mercer Hayes, a Hearst College student who would be convicted in the serial rape case in the episode "Spit & Eggs". Despite having this role on Veronica Mars, Devlin would go on to play Duncan Kane, a role originated by Teddy Dunn before he left the show in "Donut Run", in the spinoff web series Play It Again, Dick.

== Reception ==
=== Ratings ===
In its original broadcast, "Wichita Linebacker" received 3.12 million viewers, ranking 84th of 92 in the weekly rankings. This figure was a slight increase from the previous episode, "My Big Fat Greek Rush Week", which was viewed by 2.96 million viewers.

=== Reviews ===
"Wichita Linebacker" received mixed to negative reviews. Eric Goldman of IGN gave the episode a 7.0 out of 10, indicating that it was "good". Despite this, he wrote a mixed review, opining that "as far as mysteries go, this was a so-so one," that "the Hearst campus rapist story just doesn't seem to be getting the proper weight it requires," and that "there's also some strange tonal issues currently." However, he praised the return of Weevil. Rowan Kaiser, writing for The A.V. Club, was also relatively critical, while focusing praise on Weevil's storyline. She referred to "Wichita Linebacker" as "what I would expect were the show not so ambitious. Here, Veronica isn't going to Hearst College, she's going to Television College, where things that are college-y happen." Television Without Pity gave the episode a "C+". "I don't think it's being overly harsh to say that this was not one of this show's stronger or more exciting episodes. The writing was oddly flat, in the first place, and the attention to detail was subpar as well." In addition, the reviewer criticized the show's treatment of its relationships. "That's one of the things that's made this show great in the past -- layering in complex and important relationships while not actually being a relationship-centered show. I only hope they go somewhere with the gambling thing, because otherwise, in my opinion, this episode will have been a total waste of time."

Price Peterson of TV.com wrote that while he "liked it overall", he disliked the focus on Logan and Weevil, writing that he was "more than ready for Weevil to be written off the show" and, "I'm getting slightly tired of [Logan's] storylines. He seems to be alternating between woe-is-me hangdog and shifty bro liar. […] Logan is not my favorite." On his blog What's Alan Watching, Alan Sepinwall wrote that "this was a fairly light-hearted hour, with the two darkest events -- Weevil beating up the abusive boyfriend and the blonde getting raped -- taking place off-screen. And if the purpose of doing shorter arcs was to avoid the loss of momentum that both the bus crash and the bridge stabbing suffered in the middle of last year, I'm not sure if it's working yet." BuzzFeed ranked the episode 47th on its ranking of Veronica Mars episodes.
