= Of Vice and Men =

- Veronica Mars episode
- Veronica reaches for her car keys as the Hearst serial rapist approaches. Director Harry Winer created the sequence with fast cutting and quick dissolves in order to give the episode a visually complex scene, an aspect of production which series creator Rob Thomas thought was often neglected on the show.
- Episode no.: Season 3 Episode 7
- Directed by: Harry Winer
- Written by: Phil Klemmer
- Production code: 3T5807
- Original air date: November 14, 2006

Guest appearances
- Laura San Giacomo as Harmony Chase; Amanda Walsh as Meryl; Rod Rowland as Liam Fitzpatrick; Ken Marino as Vinnie Van Lowe; Taylor Sheridan as Danny Boyd; Ryan Devlin as Mercer Hayes; Patrick Fabian as Professor Hank Landry; Andrew McClain as Moe Slater; Charlie Weber as Glen

Episode chronology
← Previous "Hi, Infidelity"	Next → "Lord of the Pi's"
- Veronica Mars season 3

"Of Vice and Men" is the seventh episode of the third season of the American mystery television series Veronica Mars, and the fifty-first episode overall. Written by Phil Klemmer and directed by Harry Winer, the episode premiered on The CW on November 14, 2006. The series depicts the adventures of Veronica Mars (Kristen Bell) as she deals with life as a college student while moonlighting as a private detective.

In this episode, Veronica helps a student, Meryl (Amanda Walsh) locate her missing boyfriend. Meanwhile, with Mercer (Ryan Devlin) imprisoned for the campus rapes, Veronica tries to find the truth. This investigation leads to an instance in which Veronica is drugged and a part of her hair is removed by a mysterious figure. In addition, Keith (Enrico Colantoni) questions the morality of his relationship with Harmony (Laura San Giacomo), leading to their breakup.

"Of Vice and Men" was one of Rob Thomas's favorite episodes from the season. It features the final appearance of San Giacomo and the reappearance of Ken Marino's character, rival detective Vinnie Van Lowe. The episode received 2.69 million viewers in its original broadcast and was given mixed reviews from television critics, with critics being divided on Veronica's increasing sarcastic behavior and the final scene involving a drugged Veronica. Eric Goldman of IGN wrote that there were some "very strong scenes in the second half", while Rowan Kaiser of The A.V. Club called the final scene "slightly manipulative."

== Plot synopsis ==
Veronica and Keith (Enrico Colantoni) have a minor fight over Keith's relationship with Harmony. Veronica is staying in Wallace (Percy Daggs III) and Piz's (Chris Lowell) dorm room. Piz comes in unexpectedly, and the two end up hanging out. However, a girl shows up and tells them that her boyfriend, Sully, has gone missing. They look in Sully's room, but the girlfriend is hesitant to help. In criminology class, Mr. Landry (Patrick Fabian) tells Veronica that he's applied her for an internship at the FBI. Veronica talks to Logan (Jason Dohring) about Mercer, but he still refuses to give her an alibi. Veronica and the girlfriend, Meryl, find that Sully has contacted another girl, Scarlett, but Scarlett knows that Sully has a girlfriend. Veronica visits Mercer in prison, and he tells her that there are many people who would want to frame him. Sully's roommate comes back to their room, and Veronica uncovers that Meryl and Sully had a fight the previous weekend.

Harmony (Laura San Giacomo) succeeds in convincing Keith that their relationship is not immoral. Vinnie Van Lowe (Ken Marino) enters Mars Investigations and tells Keith that he needs to know the whereabouts of Kendall Casablancas. Afterwards, he blackmails Keith by showing him pictures of him and Harmony, saying that Keith must pay $4,000 to prevent the information from being shown to Harmony's husband. Veronica gets exasperated with Meryl when she feels that Meryl refuses to see the truth about Sully cheating on her. Veronica talks to the professor about his affair with Mindy O’Dell, and turns down the internship, but he insists it isn't a quid pro quo. After seeing Meryl and Scarlett hug, Veronica tries to frame Mercer to no avail. After showing Logan the evidence that Mercer is innocent, he tells Veronica what he was doing: they were in Tijuana, and Mercer set a room on fire. There were girls in Mercer's room, but Logan ran away when the fire spread.

Meryl gets a voicemail from Sully, and Veronica agrees to track him. Veronica and Keith have another fight, with Veronica insulting his character for having a relationship with Harmony. Veronica and Meryl track the cell phone in the Fitzpatricks’ bar. Liam Fitzpatrick drunkenly picks up Veronica and carries her around, but Vinnie supposedly takes a picture of it to get him off her. Veronica and Meryl go to the police station and find that Sully washed up on shore after surfing with a bump on his head and had mild amnesia. While cleared, Mercer is still being held in custody. Keith rejects Harmony, and Logan nervously calls Keith for the whereabouts of Veronica. At the food court, Veronica is listening to voicemails from Logan and Keith when she notices an issue with her food. She returns to the counter with her plate, leaving her drink unattended. She returns to her seat but, after eating and drinking, soon feels disoriented. She recognizes this feeling as identical to her experience after ingesting GHB previously. Veronica attempts to get into her car and collapses just outside of it but she manages to set off the alarm. A mysterious figure appears and stops the alarm. There is a buzzing sound, and the scene cuts to a nearby Logan hearing the alarm. Logan finds Veronica's car with her unconscious on the ground next to it. He picks her up to reveal some locks of Veronica's hair on the ground and a bald spot on the back of her head.

== Production ==
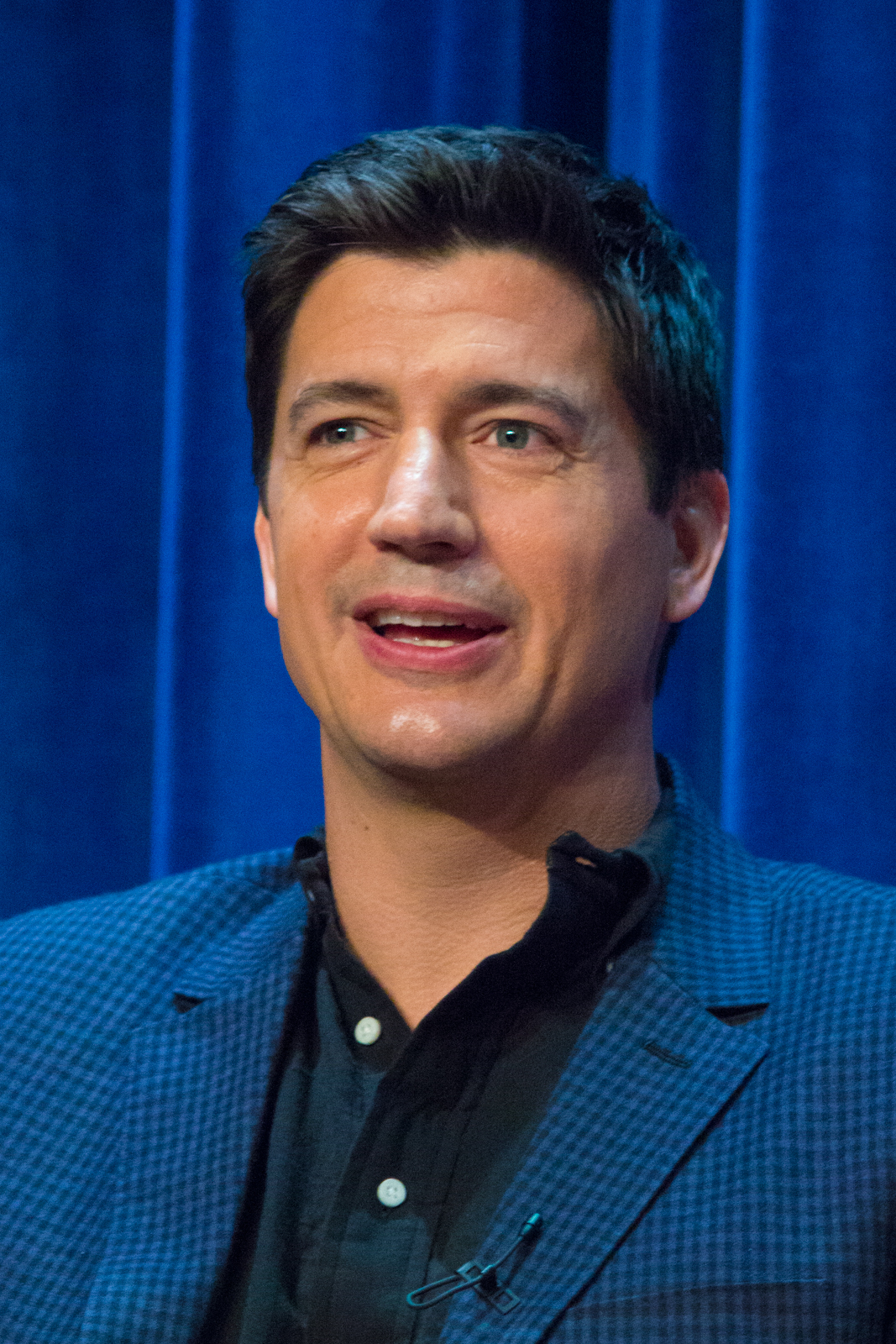
Ken Marino makes his return to the series in the episode.

"Of Vice and Men" was written by Phil Klemmer and directed by Harry Winer, marking Klemmer's twelfth writing credit for the series and Winer's fourth directing credit (after "Meet John Smith", "Blast from the Past", and "Wichita Linebacker"). The episode features a reappearance by the character of Vinnie Van Lowe, played by Ken Marino, who did not appear for several episodes previously. Thomas complimented Marino's performance in the scene in which he hands pictures of Harmony to Keith, saying that near the end of the scene, Marino turns a "cartoonish" character into something "real and menacing." In addition, he thought that Marino's performance in the scene effectively blurred the lines of comedy and drama on the show.

"Of Vice and Men" was one of the highlights of season three for Thomas. He was especially proud of the scene in which Veronica is drugged, which was created to give the show an interesting visual sequence, an aspect of production which Thomas thought was too often neglected on Veronica Mars. The episode also marks the final appearance in the series by Laura San Giacomo, who appeared on three episodes of Veronica Mars in total. Promos for the episode included much of the final sequence in which Veronica is drugged and approached by the rapist, a choice which several critics considered a major spoiler.

== Reception ==
In its original broadcast, "Of Vice and Men" received 2.69 million viewers, marking a slight decrease from "Hi, Infidelity" and ranking 97th of 99 in the weekly rankings.

The episode received mixed reviews from television critics. Eric Goldman of IGN gave the episode an 8 out of 10, indicating that it was "great". While calling Veronica "not likable at all" in the episode, he praised the second half of the episode, particularly the final sequence involving a drugged Veronica. He wrote, "Veronica Mars seems to slowly be getting back on track. There are still some problems to be sure, but this week's episode was a good one, and most notably, built towards some very strong scenes in the second half." Price Peterson, writing for TV.com, was also positive towards the episode, writing "This was good! I liked all of the scenes of Piz sleeping on the floor. And as much as it freaks me out to see Veronica in harm's way (I shouldn't be watching TV, apparently), I appreciated the forward momentum in this plotline." Television Without Pity gave the episode an "A".

Alan Sepinwall, on his blog What's Alan Watching, was mixed towards "Of Vice and Men", writing that the episode's focus on the mystery of the week did not work thematically, as Veronica did not have a stake in its solving. "The better we get to know the supporting characters and the closer each arc gets to its conclusion, the harder it gets to care about stories that don't have a really personal connection for Veronica." Rowan Kaiser, writing for The A.V. Club, was very critical of the episode, naming five ways in which she thought Veronica was unlikable in the episode. "Simply put, Veronica spends most of "Of Vice and Men" acting like she's better and smarter than everyone else. Of course, she is smarter than everyone, so that's okay. But better? Sometimes that's justified, sometimes it's not," elaborating that Veronica became increasingly unlikeable in the episode. She was also negative towards the final sequence, writing "it feels slightly manipulative," commenting that the show was not ready to tackle scenes of attempted rape.
