= Lord of the Pi's =

- Veronica Mars episode
- Episode no.: Season 3 Episode 8
- Directed by: Steve Gomer
- Written by: Diane Ruggiero
- Production code: 3T5808
- Original air date: November 21, 2006

Guest appearances
- Patty Hearst as Selma Hearst Rose; David Tom as Chip Diller; Charles Shaughnessy as Budd Rose; Chastity Dotson as Nish Sweeney; Cher Ferreyra as Fern Delgado; Michael Charles Roman as Wilson Behan; Krista Kalmus as Claire Nordhouse; Brian Kimmet as Brant; Keri Lynn Pratt as Hallie Piatt; Alan F. Smith as Roger Hearst; Ed Begley, Jr. as Dean Cyrus O'Dell

Episode chronology
← Previous "Of Vice and Men"	Next → "Spit & Eggs"
- Veronica Mars season 3

"Lord of the Pi's" is the eighth episode of the third season of the American mystery television series Veronica Mars, and the fifty-second episode overall. Written by executive producer Diane Ruggiero and directed by Steve Gomer, the episode premiered on The CW on November 21, 2006. The series depicts the adventures of Veronica Mars (Kristen Bell) as she deals with life as a college student while moonlighting as a private detective.

In this episode, Veronica and Keith (Enrico Colantoni) look into the mysterious disappearance of a wealthy heiress and college board trustee, Selma Rose (Patty Hearst). The pair eventually find her in hiding in order to avoid a complex scam in which her husband would cheat her out of money in a divorce settlement. Meanwhile, Veronica investigates and eventually finds out some startling information related to the radical feminist Lilith House—that they faked several of the rapes supposedly perpetrated by the Hearst serial rapist. In addition, Logan and Veronica's relationship becomes even more tumultuous, with Logan eventually coming to the realization that they need to break up.

Patty Hearst guest stars in the episode, something that was planned since July 2006. Hearst did not know that she would be appearing on the show until after she was chosen due to a lack of communication between her and her agent. She was reluctant to appear as a character similar to herself, but she eventually agreed. In addition, Hearst's character was initially scheduled to have a lesbian kiss with Keri Lynn Pratt's character, but the scene was vetoed by the network for unknown reasons.

"Lord of the Pi's" was viewed by 2.57 million viewers in its initial airing and received a polarized reaction from television critics, with commentators being divided over Kristen Bell's performance, Hearst's appearance, and the plot twist that the feminist Lilith House faked several rapes. Eric Goldman of IGN thought that it was the best episode so far of season three, while Rowan Kaiser of The A.V. Club thought that it was too varied tonally.

== Plot synopsis ==
After two people find Chip Diller (David Tom), the president of the Pi Sigma Sigma fraternity, passed out with his head shaved, Veronica gets hired as a photographer for the Hearst newspaper. Logan (Jason Dohring) requests that Veronica stop looking into the serial rapist case, but she refuses and they fight. The Hearst board of trustees is going to decide whether or not to shut down the fraternities, but an important member, Selma Rose, goes missing in the middle of a cocktail party hosted by the College the day before the vote. Dean O'Dell (Ed Begley, Jr.) immediately believes that she's gone missing, asking Veronica and Keith to help. Veronica speaks to one of the feminist Lilith House girls, while Keith speaks to Selma's husband. Veronica poses as a reporter to get news from Sheriff Lamb (Michael Muhney) on the case. Veronica speaks to Dick (Ryan Hansen), who says that Chip Diller had a Roman numeral easter egg implanted in his anus, and Veronica suspects the Lilith House girls.

Keith finds out that Selma might have disappeared to get away from her husband. Veronica shows Wallace the Roman numerals, and they deduce that it is a date, and Veronica learns that a sorority house member died on that day. Veronica confronts a sorority girl about the dead member, and she implies that others believe that something happened to her. After finding out that leaving her husband after ten years would be beneficial to Selma, Veronica and Keith break into the Roses' house and find Selma on the couch. Selma tells the pair why she has "disappeared": Mr. Rose is trying to scam her for more money and has blackmailed her with knowledge of a lesbian affair with her dog walker.

Chip Diller gets into a fight with the other Pi Sigs, and Veronica gets involved. However, Veronica is pulled away by a security guard hired by Logan. Veronica is angry with Logan about this, but they eventually reconcile and say "I love you" to each other. Sheriff Lamb arrests Mr. Rose when Selma is found in the guesthouse, and Selma forces Mr. Rose to give her a favorable settlement. Selma decides to dissolve the Greek system. Veronica discusses the girl who fell off the roof, and she attempted suicide when the Pi Sigs mistreated her. Veronica states her belief that the Lilith House girls faked more than one rape, and Logan becomes distraught when he sees Veronica decline his phone call.

== Production ==
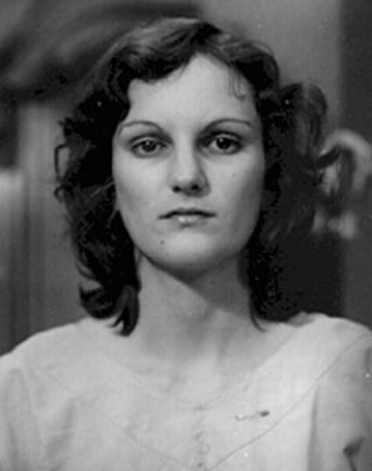
Kidnap victim Patty Hearst (mugshot pictured) guest stars in "Lord of the Pi's".

The episode was written by Diane Ruggiero and directed by Steve Gomer, marking Ruggiero's fifteenth writing credit, and Gomer's fourth and final directing credit for the series. The episode features a guest appearance by Patty Hearst, a wealthy heiress and famous kidnapping victim. Series creator Rob Thomas came up with the idea for Hearst's storyline in July 2006, stating, "If we can get Patty Hearst to play a board of trustees member – what if she got kidnapped? That would be a pretty great story to tell. It's not an idea we've broken, but it's up on the wall as a possibility." Hearst had recently appeared on single-episode parts on Boston Common and Son of the Beach. Due to a miscommunication between Thomas, Hearst, and her agent, Hearst was booked for Veronica Mars before she knew about the guest role, with Thomas telling TV Guide that she was playing a character that was similar to herself. Hearst described reacting to the casting news: "I was on the computer one day and read that I was going to be on Veronica Mars. Rob Thomas was giving an interview and happily saying, 'Oh yes, and we're very excited.' " After hearing this news, Hearst contacted her agent and jokingly asked her when the agent was planning on telling her that she would be appearing on the show.

Hearst was reluctant to play a character similar to herself, commenting, "I'd never gone in and done a cameo as myself or anything, and I wouldn't do that. Yes, the college is called Hearst…which I thought was funny, and it's certainly not related to publishing." Hearst had never previously accepted roles where she was asked to play herself, stating that it was a "pathetic attempt to get attention" when other celebrities played themselves or characters similar to themselves. Hearst had heard of Veronica Mars and seen several episodes prior to her appearance; nevertheless, she still needed to talk to Thomas about the series and her character before agreeing to guest star, commenting that she discovered that the character's background was not exceedingly similar to her own life, as "Selma's situation is nothing like anything I've had to deal with." When reading the script for the first time, Hearst was amused by the fact that her character was the heiress to the "Hearst Mart fortune", comparing it to Walmart; she stated, "when I read that in the script, I burst out laughing. It was a spit-take kind of thing. I almost fell over." When asked whether or not the character would become a recurring one, she responded that the idea had not come up in discussions with the crew. However, she stated that she would accept if given the opportunity, and she particularly enjoyed working with Kristen Bell, Enrico Colantoni, and Ed Begley, Jr.

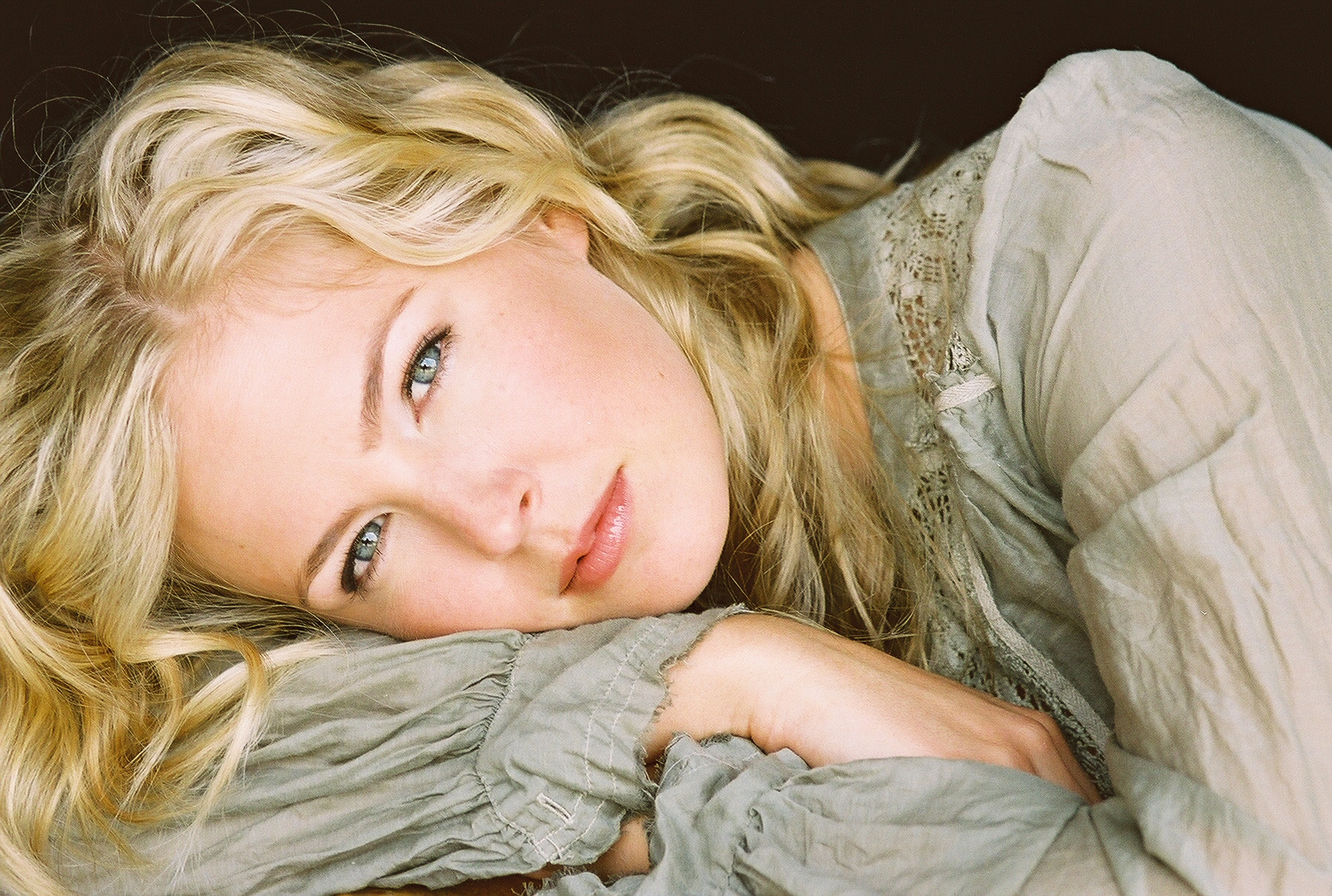
Hearst's character was slated to have a lesbian kiss with Keri Lynn Pratt's character, but the scene was vetoed by the network.

On the day of the episode's airing, Hearst expected that most Veronica Mars fans would not remember her kidnapping and the subsequent events, stating "I won't be a distraction for them. They can focus in on the juicy story line." Charles Shaughnessy appears as Selma Rose's husband, Budd. The episode was initially written to feature a lesbian kiss between Hearst's character and Keri Lynn Pratt's character, Hallie, when the two were discovered to be having an affair. However, The CW, the network the series aired on, stepped in and decided to cut the scene before it was filmed. Hearst reported, "I meet Keri and I'm like, 'Hello.' We didn't know until we were on the set we couldn't actually kiss. We were all set for that." AOL TV commented that the network might have made the choice to prevent "Lord of the Pi's" from becoming a lesbian kiss episode involving an older woman, while AfterEllen.com called the choice "bizarre".

== Reception ==
In its original broadcast, the episode received 2.57 million viewers, ranking 84th of 89 in the weekly rankings and marking a decrease from the previous episode, "Of Vice and Men", which was viewed by 2.69 million.

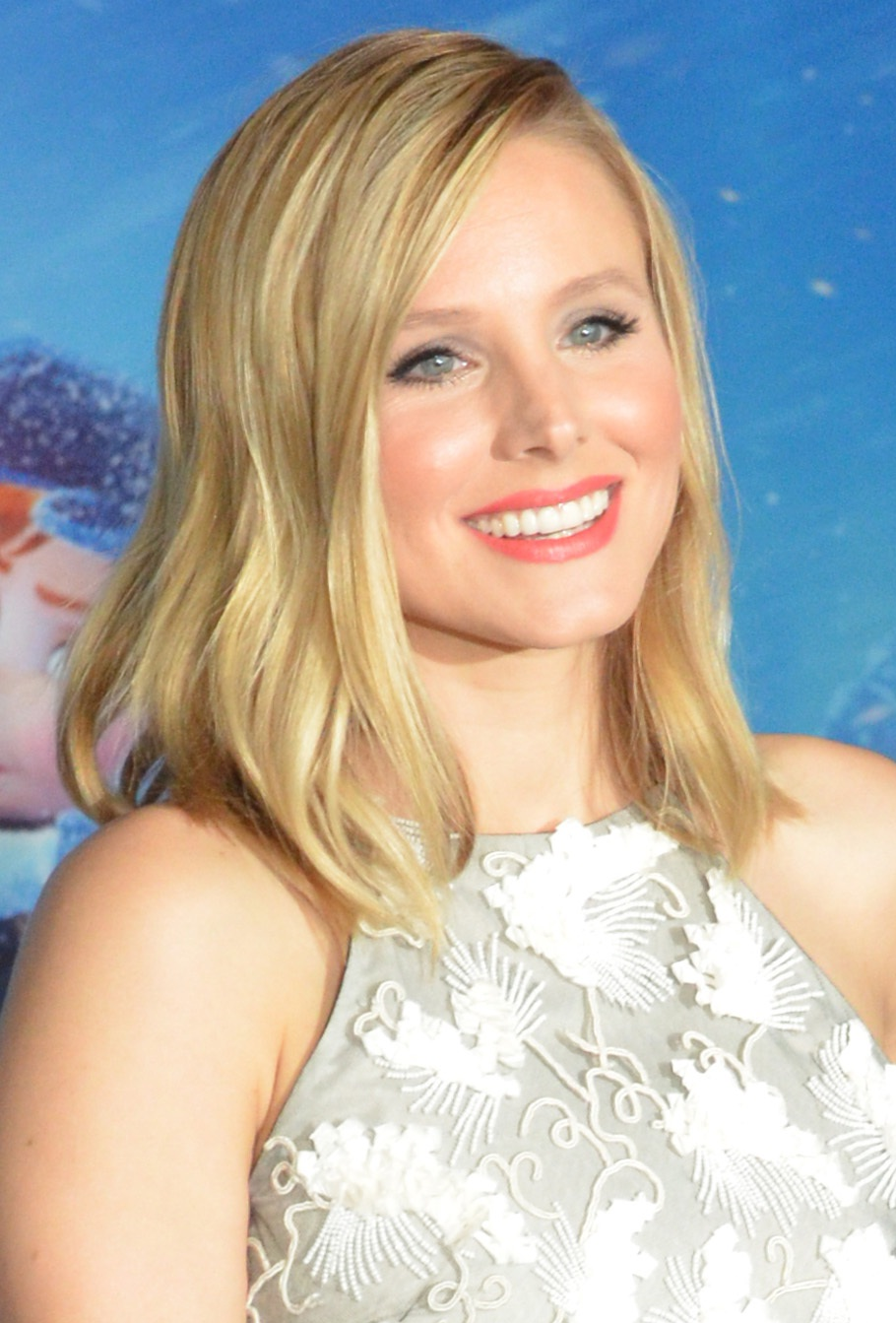
Kristen Bell's performance in the episode received mixed reviews from television critics.

The episode received a polarized critical reaction. Eric Goldman, writing for IGN, gave the episode an 8.5 out of 10, indicating that it was "great". He called it "the best so far of season three, as it did a nice job of going back and forth between the mystery of the week, the ongoing rape storyline, and Veronica's personal issues, with each aspect well-represented. While displeased with Hearst's acting, he called the storyline "good, fun stuff". He also enjoyed the emotional advancement of Veronica and Logan's relationship, writing that he showed genuine emotion in the episode, in contrast to his usual sarcastic demeanor. Reviewer Alan Sepinwall, on his blog What's Alan Watching, called it "one of the season's strongest episodes." He elaborated, "With Diane Ruggiero on script, you know there's going to be the funny [sic]. […] Plus, we did get a Veronica/Keith team-up, just on the Mystery of the Week instead of the rape arc." Television Without Pity gave the episode a "B".

Other critics were more mixed or negative, with many criticizing the negative reveal of the feminist Lilith House. Keith McDuffee of AOL TV thought that the episode raised more questions than it answered: such as "[the Lilith House girls] seem to accept that several rapes were faked, and then Veronica seems to just leave without that question being answered," arguing that the abrupt ending to the scene constituted an out-of-character moment (she should have acted more negatively). In addition, he criticized Bell's performance, commenting "Speaking of Veronica, she seemed like she was on something tonight. Just outright acting silly-odd, dancing around with some pretty lame jokes." Price Peterson of TV.com wrote, "Honestly, that fake-rape reveal was enough for me to flip my television the bird. […] Can we please end this nonsense and get into a main storyline that isn't bad and offensive?" However, he also added, "so yeah, other than the faked rapes, this was a largely entertaining episode." Rowan Kaiser of The A.V. Club was very negative towards the episode, calling it "downright weird" and that it "veers wildly in tone". She also was critical of Hearst's plotline, saying that it was too referential to real-life events and fictional works to stand well on its own. Concluding, the reviewer wrote, "The oscillations between drama and comedy, normally the show's strength, seem excessive. […] And the rape storyline continues to be tonally difficult at best, tone-deaf at worst."

Tanner Stransky, writing for Entertainment Weekly, enjoyed some aspects of the episode and disliked others. "Last night's Veronica Mars was one of those love-it-or-hate-it episodes." He enjoyed the development of the rape case, Veronica's jokes, and Logan's character development, while he disliked the reason that the rapes occurred, Patty Hearst's acting, Veronica's meanness, and Wallace's absence. BuzzFeed ranked the episode as the worst of the series, calling it unmemorable.
