= Charlie Don't Surf (Veronica Mars) =

- Veronica Mars episode
- Episode no.: Season 3 Episode 4
- Directed by: Jason Bloom
- Written by: Diane Ruggiero; Jason Elen
- Production code: 3T5804
- Original air date: October 24, 2006

Guest appearances
- Matt Czuchry as Norman Phipps; Chastity Dotson as Nish Sweeney; David Tom as Chip Diller; Krista Kalmus as Claire Nordhouse; Parry Shen as Hsiang "Charleston" Chu; Laura San Giacomo as Harmony Chase; Ryan Eggold as Charlie Stone

Episode chronology
| ← Previous "Wichita Linebacker" | Next → "President Evil" |
- Veronica Mars season 3

"Charlie Don't Surf" is the fourth episode of the third season of the American mystery television series Veronica Mars, and the forty-eighth episode overall. Co-written by executive producer Diane Ruggiero and Jason Elen and directed by Jason Bloom, the episode premiered on The CW on October 24, 2006.

The series depicts the adventures of Veronica Mars (Kristen Bell) as she deals with life as a college student while moonlighting as a private detective. In this episode, Veronica and her father, Keith (Enrico Colantoni) take on three cases—they figure out who is taking Logan's (Jason Dohring) trust fund money while Veronica gets involved in the accusations surrounding the Pi Sigma fraternity in the serial rapist case and Keith helps a woman, Harmony Chase (Laura San Giacomo), track down her possibly cheating husband.

"Charlie Don't Surf" featured several notable guest stars, including Matt Czuchry, Ryan Eggold, and Laura San Giacomo, who plays Harmony Chase, a romantic interest for Keith. Actor Enrico Colantoni, who plays Keith, wanted San Giacomo to play the role of Harmony because of the actors' ongoing friendship since their show Just Shoot Me! Both actors enjoyed the guest appearance so much that they lobbied the show's production team to continue the characters' romantic storyline in the future. The episode received mostly positive reviews from television critics.

== Synopsis ==
Logan comes over for dinner at Veronica's house, and Keith becomes increasingly annoyed when Veronica steers Logan away from answering some questions. Veronica goes into Parker Lee's (Julie Gonzalo) room, where Veronica reveals that she was raped as well. A journalist interviews Parker, while Logan discusses finances with his accountant. Logan asks Veronica for help in searching through records in an attempt to catch the accountant. Meanwhile, an old acquaintance, Harmony Chase (Laura San Giacomo) asks Keith to investigate her husband, who may be having an affair. Wallace informs Veronica that there was a Pi Sigma fraternity party the night of every rape. Later, Dick (Ryan Hansen) asks Veronica to prove that the fraternity is innocent, and Veronica agrees just to infiltrate the fraternity. Keith sees the husband getting into a car with another woman. He contacts Harmony and presents the evidence.

Veronica talks to the fraternity boys, and one of them tells her information that leads to her suspecting a boy named Chip. Keith and Harmony flirt, and Harmony shows a good amount of true romantic interest in Keith. Logan's family has been donating $10,000 a month to “Aaron’s Kids”, which Veronica learns is not actually a charity. Veronica talks to Chip, who says that he was with another girl, who admits it while saying that she'll never say so openly. Veronica turns her suspicion on Dick. After doing more digging, Veronica says that the money is going to Logan's illegitimate brother, Charlie Stone. Parker insults Veronica for supposedly working with the fraternity. Keith catches Harmony's husband kissing another woman. After talking to one of the other rape victims, Veronica discusses Claire with a slightly offbeat clerk, who says that Claire went in with a guy. Logan meets Charlie (Matt Czuchry), and they connect over surfing. However, Veronica notices some inconsistencies at Charlie's private school job.

Veronica learns that “Charlie” is in fact a reporter who is doing a story on Logan, and Logan punches him. Keith tells Harmony that her husband was not in fact cheating after all. Veronica obtains proof that another person, not one of the fraternity members, was with Claire the night she was raped. While retrieving Logan's watch, Veronica learns that Logan's actual half-brother did not betray him to the journalist.

== Production ==
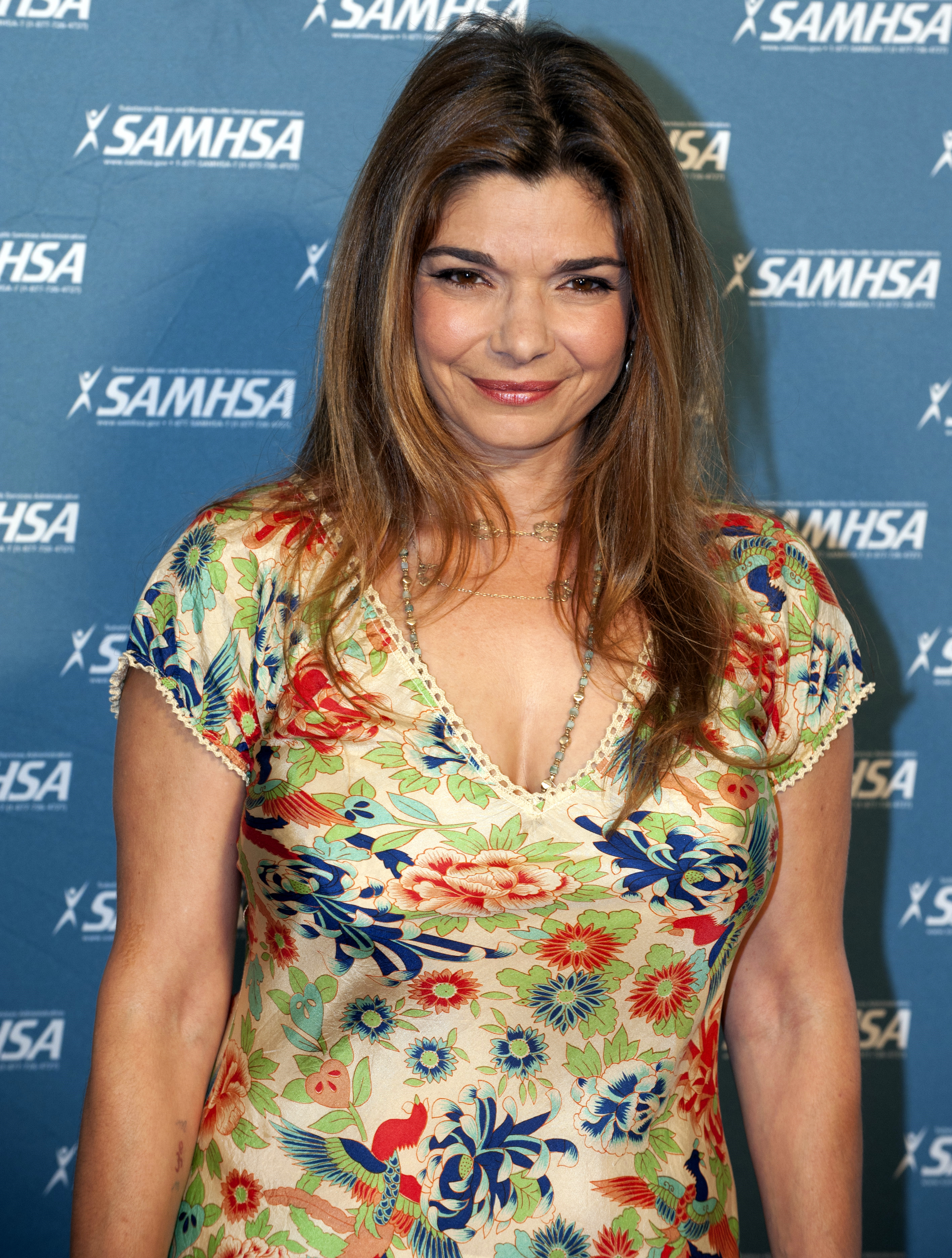
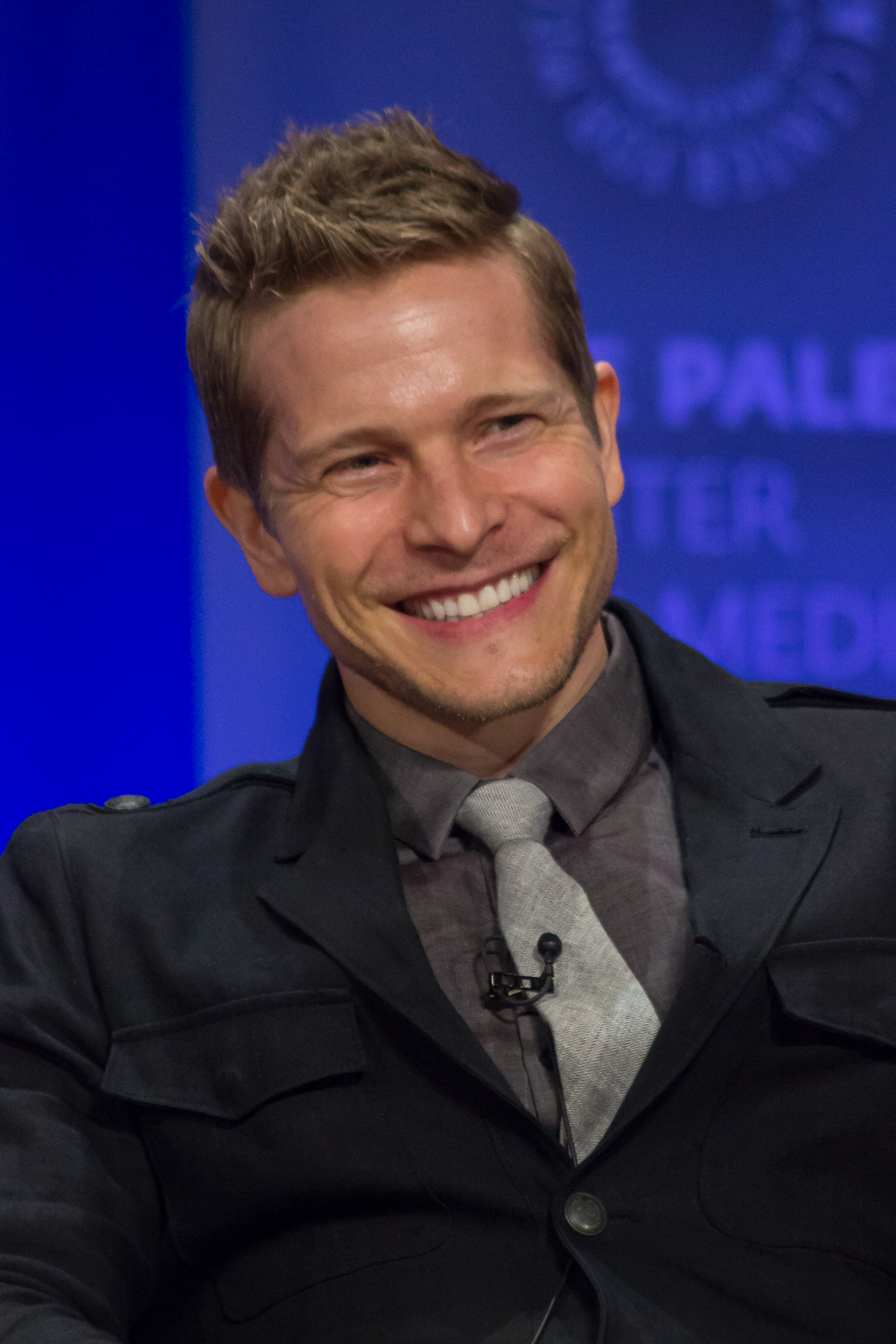
Laura San Giacomo (left) and Matt Czuchry (right) guest star in the episode.

The episode was written by executive producer Diane Ruggiero and Jason Elen and directed by Jason Bloom, marking Ruggiero's fourteenth writing credit, Elen's first and only writing credit for the show, and Bloom's third directing credit for the series. The episode features several notable guest stars. Matt Czuchry appears as Vanity Fair reporter Norman Phipps, who poses as Logan's half-brother for a story. Czuchry was a series regular at the time for Gilmore Girls, the lead-in show for Veronica Mars. Ryan Eggold appears as Charlie Stone, Logan's actual half brother. According to Variety, the role was initially scheduled to be a recurring one. Series regular Tina Majorino filmed scenes for the episode, although they were deleted in post-production.

In her first appearance, Laura San Giacomo plays Harmony Chase, a woman who hires Keith to investigate her cheating husband. The two were both series regulars on the NBC sitcom Just Shoot Me!. The two actors had maintained a close friendship after their sitcom was cancelled, and when Rob Thomas brought up a romantic storyline for Keith to Colantoni, he suggested San Giacomo for the role. San Giacomo accepted the role, later stating, "It was kind of a no-brainer situation for me. I love Rico, love working with him, and it was just as much fun as I thought it would be." In addition to sharing in-jokes about Just Shoot Me! while on set, Colantoni also remembered what a good actress he thought she was in their earlier days. After the first appearance, both Colantoni and San Giacomo lobbied for more storylines together. Thomas was open to the possibility, saying, "I wouldn't hesitate to go back to this, because I was really happy with how it played out." San Giacomo would go on to appear on three episodes of the show.

== Reception ==
=== Ratings ===
In its original broadcast, "Charlie Don't Surf" was viewed by 3.33 million viewers, ranking 97th of 104 in the weekly rankings. This figure was an increase in 0.21 million viewers from the previous episode, "Wichita Linebacker", which received 3.12 million.

=== Reviews ===
The episode received mostly positive reviews. Eric Goldman of IGN gave the episode a 7.5 out of 10, indicating that it was a "good" episode. He was positive towards the Logan and Keith storylines, writing "the other main storylines, featuring Logan and Keith, were nice ones for the respective characters," calling the half-brother plotline "interesting". On the advancing of the rapist plot, Goldman praised the increase in Veronica's personal involvement with the case, while continuing to criticize the portrayal of the feminists in the episode. "At this point, neither we, nor Veronica, seem to be meant to have nearly any sympathy for them. And yet, shouldn't we all naturally be able to connect more to a group of girls who are passionately seeking to stop a serial rapist on campus?" Price Peterson of TV.com gave the episode a very positive review, lauding the Logan's half-brother storyline, calling it "Top quality stuff. I loved the moment when Veronica realized Logan's brother was an imposter and in the next scene we saw the two guys surfing together. So much suspense!" Television Without Pity gave "Charlie Don't Surf" a "B+". The reviewer was very positive towards the plot involving Logan and his supposed half-brother, writing, "since Logan actually knows how to find Charlie in person, perhaps this all doesn't have to be quite as tragic as it's coming off. Still, in my opinion? Best episode of the season so far."

Alan Sepinwall was very positive towards the episode on his blog What's Alan Watching, calling Czuchry's casting "genius" and that "the heavier focus on the rape storyline was welcome, though the amount of time spent on Logan Squared robbed it of some urgency." In addition, he wrote that "The 'Just Shoot Me' reunion gave an interesting twist to the usual private eye infidelity case." Rowan Kaiser, writing for The A.V. Club, gave a mostly positive review, writing that it struck a good balance in a storyline that could go wrong very quickly. "This happens with emotionally charged criminal cases. Mass public scapegoating is an all-too-human reaction, one studied by a bunch of social sciences (Salem Witch Trials, anyone?). And it’s certainly interesting to have Veronica trying to be the voice of reason. I think that largely works here, but it’s a delicate balance. This could easily go so very wrong."
