= My Big Fat Greek Rush Week =

- Veronica Mars episode
- Episode no.: Season 3 Episode 2
- Directed by: John Kretchmer
- Written by: Diane Ruggiero
- Production code: 3T5802
- Original air date: October 10, 2006

Guest appearances
- Andrew McClain as Moe Slater; Rod Rowland as Liam Fitzpatrick; Jason Beghe as Cormac Fitzpatrick; David Tom as Chip Diller; Samm Levine as Samuel Horshack; Rider Strong as Rafe; Chastity Dotson as Nish Sweeney; Keri Lynn Pratt as Hallie Platt; Rachelle Lefevre as Marjorie #2; Dan Castellaneta as Dr. Kinny

Episode chronology
← Previous "Welcome Wagon"	Next → "Wichita Linebacker"
- Veronica Mars season 3

"My Big Fat Greek Rush Week" is the second episode of the third season of the American mystery television series Veronica Mars, and the forty-sixth episode overall. Written by executive producer Diane Ruggiero and directed by John T. Kretchmer, the episode premiered on The CW on October 10, 2006.

The series depicts the adventures of Veronica Mars (Kristen Bell) as she deals with life as a college student while moonlighting as a private detective. In this episode, Veronica infiltrates the Theta Beta sorority as part of her investigation into Parker's rape. Meanwhile, the Hearst sociology teacher, Dr. Kinny (Dan Castellaneta), conducts an experiment similar to the Stanford prison experiment.

"My Big Fat Greek Rush Week" featured several notable guest stars, including appearances from Dan Castellaneta, Samm Levine, Rider Strong, and Rachelle Lefevre. In addition, David Tom returned as Chip Diller after previously appearing in the second season. The episode was watched by 2.96 million people in its initial airing and received mixed to positive reviews from television critics.

== Synopsis ==
A police officer interrogates Parker (Julie Gonzalo) about her rape, but she does not remember any of it. Veronica tells Sheriff Lamb (Michael Muhney) that she ran into the room and heard Parker having sex, and Parker berates her for not checking to see what was happening. Keith (Enrico Colantoni) hikes through the desert after fleeing from Cormac Fitzpatrick (Jason Beghe); Cormac later realizes that Keith has disappeared and starts following him. Wallace (Percy Daggs III) and Logan's (Jason Dohring) sociology professor recruits volunteers for a Stanford prison experiment-like study. Veronica interviews for a photography position at the college newspaper, but the editor tasks her with writing an exposé of the Theta Beta sorority, where Parker was during the night of her rape. Parker’s parents appear at Hearst and announce that they are going to remove her from the college in light of her assault. During her investigation, Veronica poses as a potential recruit, but she does not note any suspicious activity. In the sociology experiment, Logan is assigned to the role of a prisoner, while Wallace acts as a "guard". While tracking Keith, Cormac gets stuck in a bear trap; his brother Liam (Rod Rowland) appears and shoots him. Veronica is invited to attend a "private party", which she believes will be the key to her exposé. At the party, Veronica encounters Dick (Ryan Hansen) and learns that Parker's room was easily accessible. Veronica pretends to be drunk in order to ascertain whether or not the sorority members collaborate with the rapist, but they just drive her home.

The police search Kendall's (Charisma Carpenter) apartment, but they only find a small amount of blood. In the fake prison during the experiment, the guards use sleep deprivation and verbal abuse to indicate the "prisoners". Returning home, Keith cries and tells Veronica that he made a mistake. The guard puts one prisoner in solitary confinement. Veronica learns that the dorm RA, Moe Flater (Andrew McClain), took Parker home the night of the rape. She confronts him, but upon further investigation, she accepts his alibi. Veronica learns that the main surveillance camera of the sorority was monitored from the den mother's room. The prisoners in the experiment successfully escape from prison. Veronica breaks into the room that is under surveillance and finds that they are growing marijuana. Veronica types up her exposé and hands it to the newspaper editor, but before it is published, one of the sorority members informs Veronica that they are growing the cannabis in order to aid the den mother's cancer. Veronica cannot stop the publication of the article, but she warns the sorority about potential repercussions nonetheless. Mac (Tina Majorino) convinces Parker to stay at Hearst.

The prisoners believe they have won the study, but the guards have tricked them by allowing them to escape, giving them the opportunity to set the clocks back 18 minutes to mislead the prisoners into thinking the experiment had ended. Keith tells the police the story of Kendall and Cormac's deaths: Kendall gave Keith a valuable painting disguised as money in a case, and Cormac tried to kill Kendall and Keith to get the case's contents. Liam killed Cormac out of anger that there was no money. The episode concludes with Logan streaking through sociology class, fulfilling a bet made earlier in the episode.

== Production ==
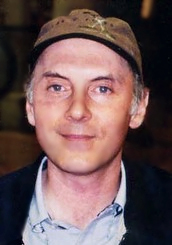
Dan Castellaneta guest starred in the episode.

The episode was written by Diane Ruggiero and directed by John T. Kretchmer, marking Ruggiero's thirteenth writing credit and Kretchmer's eleventh directing credit for the series. The episode features several notable guest appearances. Dan Castellaneta, best known as the voice of Homer Simpson on The Simpsons, appears as Dr. Kinny, a sociology professor. Rider Strong guest stars as a student who participates as a guard in the experiment. The episode features a guest appearance by Samm Levine, best known for his role on Freaks and Geeks. Levine had previously worked with series star Chris Lowell on Life as We Know It, a show that had been cancelled in 2005. Rachelle Lefevre, known for her later roles as Victoria in The Twilight Saga and in Under the Dome, guest stars as Marjorie, one of the sorority girls who becomes friends with Veronica.

On the DVD Commentary, series creator Rob Thomas opined that the relationship between Veronica and Keith was the core of the series and listed the scene in which Keith stays up all night before scaring Veronica in the morning as one of his favorite examples of their chemistry in the season. Thomas highlighted the scene in which a girl shows Veronica around the sorority as indicative of Hansen's comedic talents; in addition, it marked the first appearance of David Tom in the season, a guest star in season two who was brought back for a recurring role in this season. The actress who played the girl showing Veronica around, Keri Lynn Pratt, previously appeared in the film Drive Me Crazy, which Thomas co-wrote.

== Reception ==
=== Ratings ===
"My Big Fat Greek Rush Week" was watched by 2.96 million viewers in its initial airing, marking a decrease from the season premiere and ranking 83rd out of 88 in the weekly rankings.

=== Reviews ===
The episode received mixed to positive reviews. Eric Goldman, writing for IGN, gave the episode an 8.3 out of 10, indicating that it was great. He wrote that it felt "more like a normal episode of the series" compared to the premiere's "introduction type" tone. He also praised the prison experiment subplot, writing that it "introduced a who's who of recognizable guest stars, all of whom could clearly rerun on a show that loves to build a large cast of periphery characters." Price Peterson, writing for TV.com, gave a positive review, writing "Anytime Veronica goes undercover as her polar opposite is just a good time, you know? […] And as much as the Stanford Experiment thing was low-stakes and standalone, I enjoyed its unpredictable twists and reveals. Perfect early season plotline." Alan Sepinwall wrote that the prison experiment plotline never getting "out of hand […] made it feel like a wasted opportunity" while writing that "Enrico Colantoni really sold Keith's despair at the resolution" of his plotline.

Writing for The A.V. Club, Rowan Kaiser gave a more mixed review, stating that the show and Veronica were both still discovering their place at the show's new setting. "The show is still tense, still powerful, still amusing. But it doesn't know how to apply those things in its new setting." However, Kaiser concluded that "Veronica Mars is a mess right now. But it’s an extremely ambitious mess. I’d watch rather 'ambitious and difficult' than 'boring,' and 'My Big Fat Greek Rush Week' was anything but boring." Television Without Pity gave the episode a "B".
