= Keri Lynn Pratt =

American actress (born 1978)

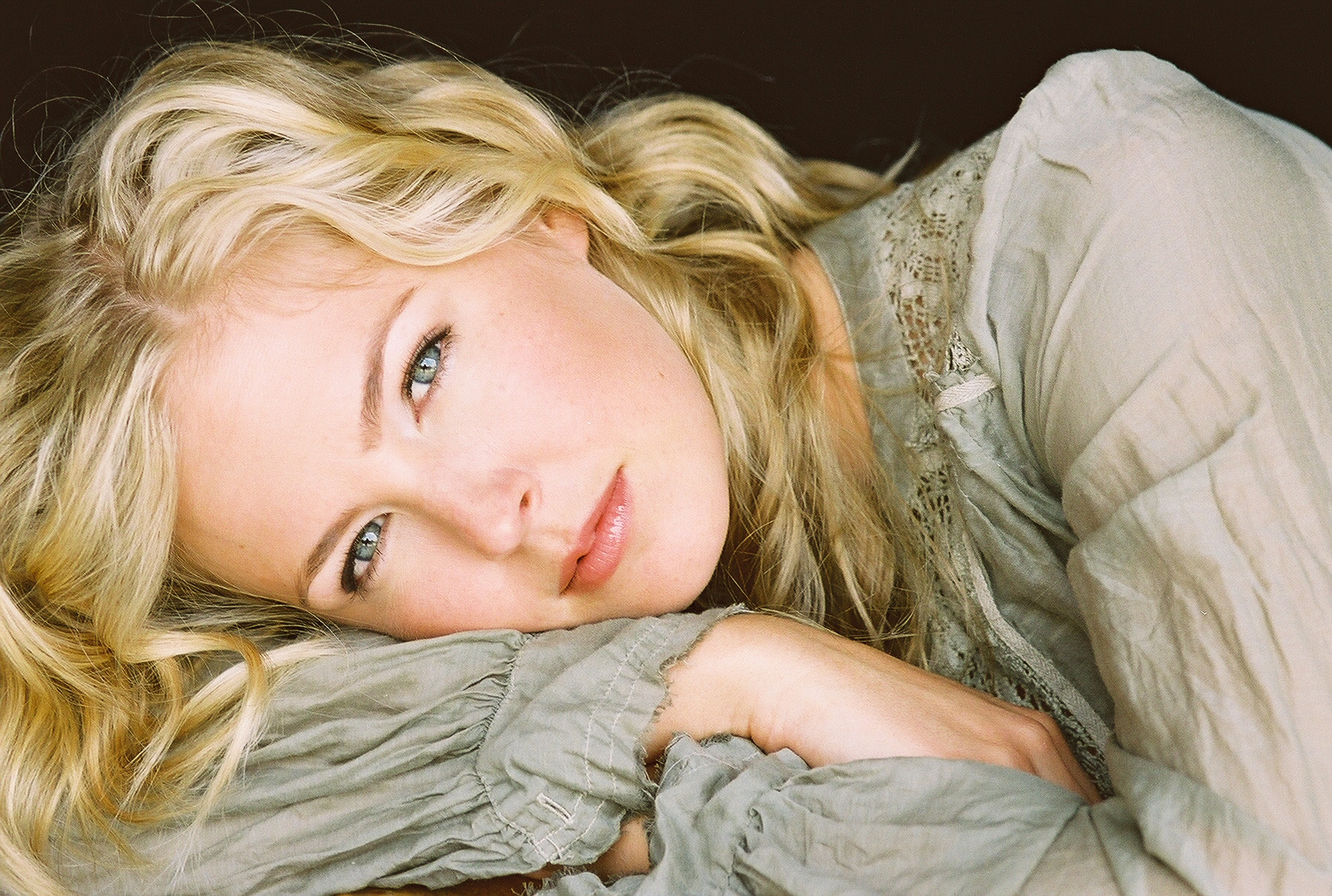
- Born: September 23, 1978 (age 47); Concord, New Hampshire, U.S.
- Other name: Keri Lynn Barneson
- Occupation: Actress
- Years active: 1999–present
- Spouse: John Barneson (m. 2011)

Keri Lynn Pratt (born September 23, 1978) is an American film and television actress. She is best known for her role as Missy Belknap in Jack & Bobby, and as Dee Vine in her film debut, Drive Me Crazy.

== Personal life ==
Pratt, who was born in Concord, New Hampshire, graduated from Pinkerton Academy in Derry. She married John Barneson in October 2011 at Hampstead Congregational Church in Hampstead, New Hampshire.

== Career ==
Pratt was a student at the Hampstead Dance Academy, and after graduation began her career at the Broadway Dance Center. She was Miss New Hampshire Teen USA 1994 and competed in the Miss Teen USA 1994 pageant. She has guest starred on such series as CSI: Crime Scene Investigation, ER, House, Bones, Veronica Mars, Law & Order: Special Victims Unit, Nip/Tuck, 7th Heaven, That '70s Show, and Sabrina the Teenage Witch. In 2005, she portrayed a 16-year-old girl named Lauren Westley on Law & Order: Special Victims Unit, even though Pratt was 27 at the time.

In 2006 she appeared in four episodes of the ABC's television series Brothers & Sisters, as an intern to Calista Flockhart and Josh Hopkins's characters. In July 2008, Pratt was cast as Kristy in the 2009 film I Hope They Serve Beer in Hell. Between 2010 and 2011, she played reporter Cat Grant in four episodes of Smallville. Not as active since 2012, Pratt appeared in the 2014 webseries of four, two-minute long, webisodes The Originals: The Awakening.

== Filmography ==
=== Film ===
Year	Title	Role	Notes
1999	Drive Me Crazy	Dee Vine	
2000	Wirey Spindell	First Date	
2000	The Smokers	Lisa Stockwell	
2001	Cruel Intentions 2	Cherie Claymon	Direct to video
2001	America's Sweethearts	Leaf Weidmann	
2002	Dead Above Ground	Kelly 'Kel' Britton	
2002	A Midsummer Night's Rave	Debbie	
2002	They Shoot Divas, Don't They?	Jenny	
2004	Fat Albert	Heather	
2006	The Surfer King	Katie	
2009	A Single Man	Blonde Secretary	
2009	I Hope They Serve Beer in Hell	Kristy	
2011	Bad Actress	Topanga Pillage	
2011	The Trouble with the Truth	Heather	
2011	Dorfman	Leeann Dorfman	
2011	FDR: American Badass!	Marietta Buford	
2012	Hell and Mr. Fudge	Sara Fudge	

=== Television ===
Year	Title	Role	Notes
2000	Sabrina the Teenage Witch	Lynn	Episode: "House of Pi's"
2000	ER	Audrey Hoffman, Miss Skokie	Episode: "Benton Backwards"
2001	That '70s Show	Tiffany	Episode: "The Trials of M. Kelso"
2001	Going to California	Elisabeth Beamis	Episode: "The Big Padoodle"
2001	CSI: Crime Scene Investigation	Anna Leah	Episode: "Evaluation Day"
2002	Class of '06	Patty	TV film
2002	Maybe It's Me	Kimberly Fitch	Episode: "The Quahog Festival Episode"
2002	They Shoot Divas, Don't They?	Jenny	TV film
2003	The Pitts	Samantha	Episode: "Miss American Pipe"
2003	Nip/Tuck	Cara Fitzgerald	Episode: "Montana/Sassy/Justice"
2003	Boston Public	Molly Sobel	Episode: "Chapter Sixty-Eight"
2003	Joan of Arcadia	Brianna Matthews	Episode: "Bringeth It On"
2004	7th Heaven	Betsy Brewer	Episode: "When Bad Conversations Happen to Good People"; Episode: "Healing Old Wounds"
2004	The Help	Veronica Ridgeway	7 Episodes (Main cast)
2004–2005	Jack & Bobby	Missy Belknap	18 episodes
2005	Campus Confidential	Cornelia Nixon	TV film
2005	Law & Order: Special Victims Unit	Lauren Westley	Episode: "Rockabye"
2005	Stacked	Carrie	Episode: "iPod"
2006	House	Amy Errington	Episode: "Sex Kills"
2006	CSI: Crime Scene Investigation	Anna Leah	Episode: "Spellbound"
2006	Bones	Chloe Daniels	Episode: "The Truth in the Lye"
2006	Brothers & Sisters	Amber Trachtenberg	4 episodes
2006	Veronica Mars	Hallie Piatt	Episode: "My Big Fat Greek Rush Week"; Episode: "Lord of the Pi's"
2007	Crossing Jordan	Lisa Price	Episode: "In Sickness & in Health"
2008	CSI: NY	Paula Tolomeo	Episode: "Personal Foul"
2008	Criminal Minds	Ashley Holden	Episode: "52 Pickup"
2008	Commuter Confidential	Daisy	TV series
2009	Life on Mars	Leslie	Episode: "Coffee, Tea, or Annie"
2009	Family Guy	Shovin' Buddy (voice, uncredited)	Episode: "Peter's Progress"
2010	The Mentalist	Daniella	Episode: "Pink Chanel Suit"
2010–2011	Smallville	Cat Grant	4 episodes
2014	The Originals	Mary-Alice Claire	Episode: "The Map of Moments"

=== Web ===
Year	Title	Role	Notes
2014	The Originals: The Awakening	Mary-Alice Claire	4 episodes
