= Imaginary Larry =

- Directed by: Riki Lindhome; Dori Oskowitz
- Written by: Riki Lindhome; Dori Oskowitz
- Produced by: Mike Drinkwater
- Starring: Riki Lindhome; Kate Micucci; Malcolm Barrett; Ryan Devlin; Christopher Stewart
- Music by: Garfunkel and Oates
- Release date: October 2009
- Running time: 14 minutes
- Country: United States
- Language: English

Imaginary Larry is a 2009 short film co-directed by Riki Lindhome and Dori Oskowitz and starring Riki Lindhome, Kate Micucci, Malcolm Barrett, Ryan Devlin, Christopher Stewart.

== Plot ==
Betsy is seen talking to herself, complaining that many of her dreams have not come true. Kenneth, who's visiting his famous brother Tevin, enters the room. Betsy panics and is embarrassed that she was caught talking to herself. She feels she has to announce that she's alone when Kenneth turns to leave. Kate, her imaginary friend, is angry Betsy ignored her presence. Kenneth returns and asks Betsy for a date.

During the date, Kate tries to dissuade Betsy from going out with him. Betsy, unable to ignore Kate's interruptions, eventually breaks down and tells Kenneth she cannot date him. Kenneth becomes distraught over his failure and begins to cut himself. He later goes to Betsy's house and she tells him about Kate. After a talk with his brother, he decides to create his own imaginary friend, who insists on being called Alfonse.

They return to Betsy's house where Alfonse is able to seduce Kate. The two imaginary friends leave, which saddens Betsy. Trying to comfort her, Kenneth sits next to her and asks "What do you think they're doing?" A split screen shows Kate and Alfonse together and Betsy and Kenneth together, with each couple making love.

== Cast ==
- Riki Lindhome as Betsy, a "desperate" secretary (as described by Tevin), her imaginary friend is Kate.
- Kate Micucci as Kate, Betsy's imaginary friend who drives away anyone she doesn't like. She leaves when she falls for Alfonse.
- Ryan Devlin as Tevin, Kenneth's brother, a celebrity, who offers him advice.
- Malcolm Barrett as Kenneth, an animal control officer and Tevin's brother who wants to go out with Betsy. He ends up creating Alfonse, his own imaginary friend, to help him with this.
- Christopher Stewart as Alfonse, Kenneth's imaginary friend. Kenneth tries to name him Larry, but he's told that he can't do that and that he is called Alfonse. He seduces Kate, who abandons Betsy and runs away with him.

== Music ==
The music for Imaginary Larry was composed by Garfunkel and Oates, the comedy music duo of Lindhome and Micucci, who wrote and performed the songs "Only You", "Fuck You", "The End" and the credit song being "Silver Lining".

== Animation ==
Imaginary Larry had two versions with the original having Kate and Alfonse played by the actual actors. The animated version of the short has the imaginary friends created as stylized cartoon versions of themselves.
