= James Jordan (actor) =

American actor (born 1979)

- Born: March 14, 1979 (age 47); Houston, Texas, U.S.
- Occupation: Actor
- Years active: 2005–present

James Jordan (born March 14, 1979) is an American actor.

== Life and career ==
Jordan was born on March 14, 1979, in Houston, Texas. He grew up in Texas and Webb City, Missouri, graduating from Webb City High School in 1997. Jordan went to college at Missouri Southern State University and graduated from the UCLA School of Theater, Film and Television with a Master of Fine Arts in Acting.

Jordan has had roles in series such as Veronica Mars, playing two different characters (Lucky, a janitor at Neptune High, and Tim Foyle), and has also appeared in Without a Trace, Seraphim Falls, Just Legal, Cold Case, Close to Home and CSI: Crime Scene Investigation among other prime-time television dramas.

Jordan has guest-starred on TNT's The Closer, Fox's 24 opposite Kiefer Sutherland, and had a guest star role on FX's Elmore Leonard-inspired series Justified starring Timothy Olyphant. Jordan was also cast as the mentally disturbed former Marine "Ray Brennan" in TNT's adaptation of April Smith's thriller novel Good Morning, Killer. The film aired as part of TNT's Movie Mystery Night in December 2011.

In 2012, Jordan played one of the "Obamas" on HBO's hit series, True Blood. He played "Ray", the anti-vampire bigot that takes Jessica Hamby hostage. He also played a role in Best Night Ever, a comedy from the creators of the Scary Movie franchise, which was released in 2014. He guest starred on CBS' The Mentalist in the winter of 2012.

Jordan guest-starred in season three of the Hulu series Blue starring Julia Stiles. Season three premiered in late March 2014. He was cast in two independent feature films in March 2015: Message from the King starring Chadwick Boseman, Luke Evans, Alfred Molina, directed by Fabrice Du Welz, and in the Kelly Reichardt directed ensemble piece Certain Women about life in small town Montana with Kristen Stewart, Laura Dern, and Michelle Williams. Both films were slated for release in 2016.

In 2017, Jordan appeared in Wind River, written and directed by Taylor Sheridan. In 2021, Jordan was cast in Those Who Wish Me Dead. Jordan also had recurring roles in several Sheridan created television shows such as Yellowstone, Mayor of Kingstown, 1883, Lioness, and Landman.

== Filmography ==
=== Film ===
Year	Title	Role	Notes
2005	Til Parole Do Us Part	Rubin Aquino	Short film
2006	Seraphim Falls	Little Brother	
2012	Atlas Shrugged: Part II	Operator	Also known as Atlas Shrugged II: The Strike
2013	Best Night Ever	Man in Red Vest	
2016	Certain Women	Hostage Specialist	
2016	Message from the King	Scott	
2017	Wind River	Pete Mickens	
2017	The Endless	Shitty Carl	
2018	Destroyer	Toby	
2019	Seberg	Special Agent Roy Maddow	
2020	Home	Russell	
2021	Those Who Wish Me Dead	Ben	
TBA	They Follow †	TBA	Post-production

=== Television ===
Year	Title	Role	Notes
2005	Over There	Young Soldier	Episode: "Spoils of War"
2005	CSI: Crime Scene Investigation	Ryan	Episode: "Shooting Stars"
2005	Close to Home	Derek	Episode: "Suburban Prostitution"
2005	Cold Case	Nick "Stump" Fanelli	Episode: "Frank's Best"
2006	Just Legal	Claude Osteen	Episode: "The Code"
2006	Without a Trace	Doug Berry	Episode: "All for One"
2006–2007; 2019	Veronica Mars	Tim "Lucky" Foyle	Recurring role; 10 episodes
2007	CSI: Miami	Clint Gilmore	Episode: "Sunblock"
2009	The Closer	Chris Dunlap	Episode: "Power of Attorney"
2010	24	Phillips	Episode: "Day 8: 5:00 a.m.-6:00 a.m."
2011	Justified	Van	Episode: "The Life Inside"
2011	Body of Proof	Alex Grant	Episode: "Lazarus Man"
2011	Good Morning, Killer	Ray Brennan	Television film
2012	True Blood	Ray	Guest role; 3 episodes
2012	The Mentalist	Chuck Calloway	Episode: "Panama Red"
2015	Fargo	Magician	Episode: "The Myth of Sisyphus"
2017	Bloodline	Will Spinetta	Episode: "Part 30"
2018	iZombie	Cain	Episode: "Mac-Liv-Moore"
2018	I'm Dying Up Here	Rusty	Episode: "The Mattresses"
2019–2022	Yellowstone	Steve Hendon	Recurring role; 12 episodes
2021–2022	Mayor of Kingstown	Ed Simmons	Recurring role; 10 episodes
2022	1883	Cookie	Recurring role; 4 episodes
2023–present	Special Ops: Lioness	Two Cups	Main role
2024–present	Landman	Dale Bradley	Main role

=== Web ===
Year	Title	Role	Notes
2014	Blue	Raphael	Episode: "Call Me Francine"

=== Video games ===
Year	Title	Role	Notes
2011	L.A. Noire	Freddie Calhoun	Voice role
