= Ryan Devlin =

American actor

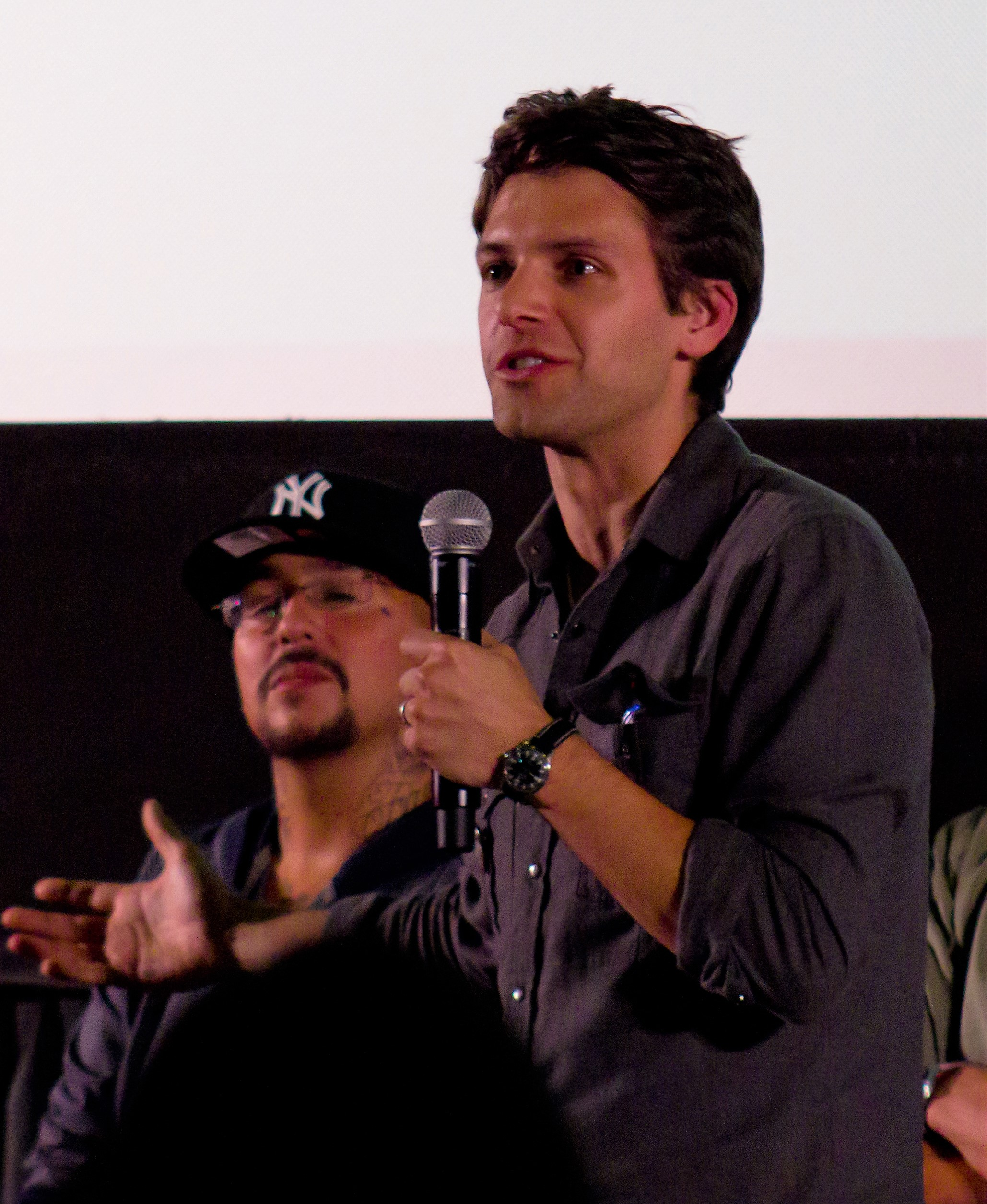
- Occupations: Actor; television presenter
- Years active: 2004–present

Ryan Devlin is an American actor. He is known for hosting the initial seasons of Are You the One?, as well as his recurring roles in the television series Brothers & Sisters, Cougar Town, Veronica Mars, Big Shots, Jane the Virgin and Grey's Anatomy. Current host for The Struggle Climbing Show.

== Filmography ==
Film roles
Year	Title	Role	Notes
2006	Life is Short	Colby	
2006	Deck the Halls	Bob Murray	
2009	Weather Girl	Walt	
2009	Imaginary Larry	Tevin	
2010	Marmaduke	Deuce/Beach Dog #2	Voice role
2013	Billy	Billy	
2016	Worst Laid Plans	Back Tattoo Customer	

Television roles
Year	Title	Role	Notes
2004	Grounded for Life	Mocha Joey	Episodes: "The Policy of Truth" and "One Is the Loneliest Number"
2004	MDN	Himself	Host
2005	America's Next Top Model	Himself	Episode: "The Girl Who Loves Bubbles and Talks to Plants"
2005	The War at Home	Keith	Episodes: "The Empire Spanks Back" and "Breaking Up is Hard to Do"
2005–2006	Living with Fran	Todd	Episodes: "Learning with Fran", "Ahead of the Plan with Fran" and "The Whole Clan with Fran"
2005	R U the Girl	Himself	Host; live finale episode
2005–2006	ET on MTV	Himself	Host
2006	South Beach	Brandon	Episode: "It Looked Like Somebody's Nightmare"
2006	Deceit	Patron	TV movie
2006, 2019	Veronica Mars	Mercer Hayes	6 episodes
2007	The World According to Barnes	Barnes	TV movie
2007	CSI: Miami	Josh Brockner	Episode: "Triple Threat"
2007–2008	Big Shots	Zack Wells	6 episodes
2008	Rock the Cradle	Himself	Host
2008	Valentine	Tucker	Episode: "Act Naturally"
2009	Trust Me	Scott Chernoff	Episode: "Au Courant"
2009	Party Down	Kellum	Episode: "Investors Dinner"
2009	The Law	Michael	TV movie
2009	The Grean Team	Billy Green	TV movie
2010	Grey's Anatomy	Bill Portman	3 episodes
2010	$#*! My Dad Says	Henry	Episode: "Pilot"
2010–2011	Brothers & Sisters	Seth Whitley	Recurring role, 6 episodes
2010–2011	Cougar Town	Smith Frank	Recurring role, 10 episodes
2011	Hawaii Five-0	Himself	Episode: "Ka Iwi Kapu"
2012	Next Caller	Mason	Episode: "Pilot"
2013	House of Lies	Cameron	Episode: "Sincerity is an Easy Disguise in This Business"
2014	CSI: Crime Scene Investigation	Detective Carl Brenner	Episode: "Let's Make a Deal"
2014	Play It Again, Dick	Himself/Duncan Kane	6 episodes
2014–2015	Jane the Virgin	Billy Cordero	4 episodes
2014–2017	Are You the One?	Himself	Host
2015	Law & Order: Special Victims Unit	Pastor Gregory Eldon	Episode: "Patrimonial Burden"
2015	Castle	Stephen Reed	Episode: "What Lies Beneath"
2018	Another Period	Cameraman	Episode: "Sex Nickelodeon"
2018	Olive Forever	Detective James	Episode: "Pilot"
2018–2019	iZombie	Dalton	3 episodes
2025	High Potential	Matty Donovan	Episode: "The Sauna at the End of the Stairs"
