= Chastity Dotson =

American actress

- Occupation: Actress
- Years active: 2001–present

Chastity Dotson is an American actress.

== Filmography ==
=== Film ===
Year	Title	Role	Notes
2002	Kingston High	Marcy	
2006	Submission	Charlene	Video
2007	Premonition	Cameron	Short
2007	Veronica in the FBI	Callie Farmer	Short
2009	A Golden Christmas	Jill Robington	TV movie
2012	The Undershepherd	Nish	
2015	Sometime, If You're Lucky	Raya	Short
2019	Gully	Angela	
2020	Trade	Tempia Harrison	Short

=== Television ===
Year	Legacy	Role	Notes
2001	The West Wing	Girl #4	Episode: "Isaac and Ishmael"
2004	Wanda Does It	Herself	Episode: "Wanda Does Photos"
2005	Related	Flash	Episode: "Pilot"
2005	CSI: NY	Tera Grace	Episode: "Dancing with the Fishes"
2006	Numbers	Karen Rhimes	Episode: "The OG"
2006-07	Veronica Mars	Nish Sweeney	Recurring Cast: Season 3
2007	Without a Trace	April	Episode: "Without You"
2007	State of Mind	Cordelia's Patient	Episode: "In Bocca Al Lupo"
2007	Saving Grace	Jennifer	Episode: "A Language of Angels"
2008	The Starter Wife	Monica	Episode: "Look Who's Stalking"
2009	House of Payne	Olivia	Recurring Cast: Season 5
2009	Raising the Bar	Eden R'Mante	Episode: "Beating a Dead Horse"
2010	Grey's Anatomy	Leslie Wilson	Episode: "State of Love and Trust"
2014	NCIS	Former Navy Lt. Monica King	Episode: "Alleged"
2014	Murder in the First	Dr. Alexis Johnson	Episode: "The City of Sisterly Love"
2014	Bones	Victoria Andrews	Episode: "The Mutilation of the Master Manipulator"
2014	Family Time	-	Episode: "Hobby Hunters"
2015	The Mentalist	Anita Hammonds	Episode: "Green Light"
2015	Single Ladies	Roshanda Rollins	Recurring Cast: Season 4
2015	Major Crimes	Melissa Zara	Episode: "Open Line"
2015-17	In the Cut	Angelique Peters	Recurring Cast: Season 1-3
2016	Bosch	Keisha Russell	Recurring Cast: Season 2
2016	Pitch	Janet Baker	Recurring Cast
2017	Imposters	Gina	Recurring Cast: Season 1
2017	Arrow	Onyx Adams	Episode: "Next of Kin"
2017-18	Patriot	Carol	Recurring Cast
2018	Shooter	Rebecca	Episode: "Lines Crossed"
2020	Manifest	Investigator Blanpied	Episode: "Airplane Bottles"
2021	All Rise	Cyndi Carlile	Episode: "Caught Up in Circles"
2022	The Rookie	Megan Suriel	Episode: "Double Down"
