= Enrico Colantoni =

Canadian actor (born 1963)

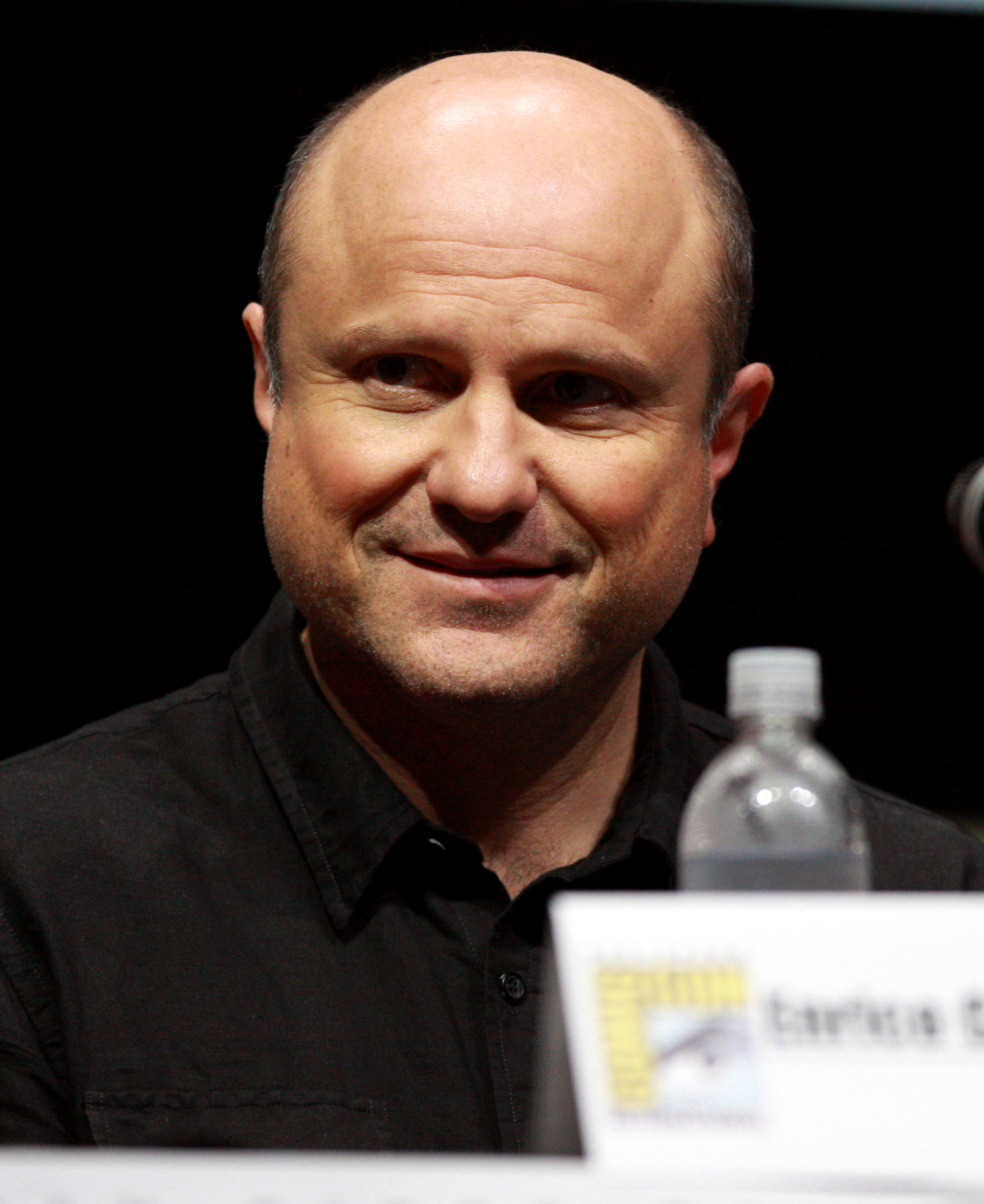
- Enrico Colantoni at the 2013 Comic Con
- Born: February 14, 1963 (age 63); Toronto, Ontario, Canada
- Education: University of Toronto (BA); Yale University (MFA)
- Occupation: Actor
- Years active: 1987–present
- Spouse(s): Nancy Snyder (m. 1997; div. 2004) Rosanna Francioni (m. 2011)
- Children: 6

Enrico Colantoni (born February 14, 1963) is a Canadian actor and director, known for portraying Mathesar in Galaxy Quest, Elliot DiMauro in the sitcom Just Shoot Me!, Keith Mars on the television series Veronica Mars, Louis Utz on the short-lived sitcom Hope & Gloria, crime lord Carl Elias on Person of Interest, and Sergeant Greg Parker on the television series Flashpoint. He has also had supporting roles in such films as The Wrong Guy, A.I. Artificial Intelligence, Contagion, and A Beautiful Day in the Neighborhood, and guest appearances on Monk, Numb3rs, Party Down, Stargate SG-1, and Bones. He also starred as Allen Conner in Remedy, played Laura Hollis's father in season three of the online web series Carmilla, and played Vincent Brambilla on TV program Allegiance. On the stage, he also acted in the off-Broadway play Fear at the Lucille Lortel Theatre.

== Early life and education ==
Colantoni was born in Toronto, Ontario, the son of Gina, a garment worker, and Quintino Colantoni, a labourer and truck driver. Both his parents were immigrants from Abruzzo, Italy, and his brother, Det. Sgt. Hector Colantoni, is a retired police officer who was with the Toronto Police Service.

Colantoni attended the University of Toronto studying psychology and sociology, but transferred to the American Academy of Dramatic Arts in New York City. Colantoni graduated from the Yale School of Drama, earning a MFA, and winning the Carol Dye Award.

== Career ==
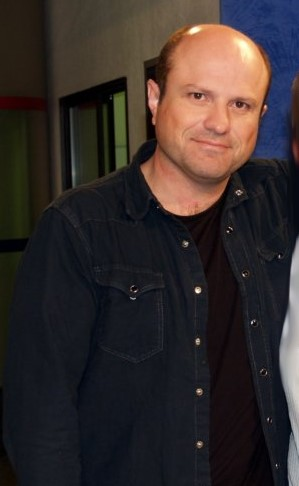
Colantoni during a TV interview in 2007

Colantoni appeared on Just Shoot Me! as Elliot DiMauro from 1997 to 2003. Colantoni played Keith Mars for three seasons on Veronica Mars from 2004 to 2007, a role he reprised in the 2014 film and the 2019 Hulu revival. He starred in the Canadian TV police drama Flashpoint as Sgt. Greg Parker (also airing in the U.S. on ION Television, and airing previously on CBS). His older brother, who was a Toronto policeman for 30 years, advised Colantoni on how to play the character. He starred in the TV series Remedy.

Colantoni acted alongside Alex Garfin in the Off-Broadway play Fear at the Lucille Lortel Theatre in 2019, directed by Tea Alagic.

He also had a recurring role on Person of Interest as crime boss Carl Elias, and on Travelers as Vincent Ingram (Traveller 001). Colantoni appeared in HBO's Westworld and in Station Eleven. He appeared in the TV series iZombie, and also directed two episodes.

== Philanthropy ==
Since 2011, Colantoni has been heavily involved with the Tema Conter Memorial Trust, an organization that assists first responders and other service personnel dealing with post-traumatic stress disorder. He became their official spokesperson.

He has also been involved in the Companion Animal Protection Society's campaign to boycott commercial pet stores, creating a video to raise awareness about the topic.

== Personal life ==
On November 11, 2011, Colantoni married Rosanna Francioni; they have four children together. He has two children from a previous marriage with nutritionist Nancy Snyder; they were married from January 1997 until 2004.

== Filmography ==
=== Films ===
Year	Title	Role	Notes
1995	Money Train	Dooley	
1996	Albino Alligator	Agent #3	
1997	The Wrong Guy	Creepy Guy	
1998	Divorce: A Contemporary Western	Barry	
1998	Screwed: A Hollywood Bedtime Story	Jack Driscoll	
1999	Stigmata	Father Dario	
1999	Galaxy Quest	Mathesar	
2001	A.I. Artificial Intelligence	The Murderer	
2002	Frank McKlusky, C.I.	Scout Bayou	
2002	The First $20 Million Is Always the Hardest	Francis Benoit	
2002	Full Frontal	Arty / Ed	
2003	The Vest	Dad	Short film
2004	Criminal	Bookish Man	
2007	The Happiest Day of His Life	Divorced wedding guest	
2008	Sherman's Way	D.J.	
2008	My Mom's New Boyfriend	Enrico the Chef	
2009	Weather Girl	George	
2010	The Fighter and the Clown	Officer Ward	Short film
2011	The Chaperone	Dr. Etman	
2011	Servitude	Franz	
2011	Contagion	Dennis French	
2013	House of Versace	Gianni Versace	
2014	Veronica Mars	Keith Mars	
2014	Lines	Doctor	
2015	The Dark Stranger	Brendan Garrison	
2017	Justice League Dark	Felix Faust (voice)	Direct-to-video
2019	Kill Chain	The Old Sniper	
2019	A Beautiful Day in the Neighborhood	Bill Isler	
2020	Feel the Beat	Frank	
2022	Vandits	Ned	
2024	Mother Father Sister Brother Frank	Jerry Jennings	
2024	Humane	Bob	
2025	Out Standing	Sgt. Monroe	
2025	Ballistic	Rick Barber	

=== Television ===
Year(s)	Title	Role(s)	Notes
1987	Night Heat		Episode: "The Wiseguy"
1987	Friday the 13th: The Series	Adrian	Episode: "Root of All Evil"
1994	Law & Order	Ron Blocker	Episode: "Censure"
1994	New York Undercover	David Kinsoling	Episode: "After Shakespeare"
1994–1995	NYPD Blue	Danny Breen, Jr.	2 episodes
1995–1996	Hope & Gloria	Louis Utz	35 episodes
1997	Life's Work	Marty Cranepool	Episode: "Neighbors"
1997	The Member of the Wedding	Mr. Addams	Television film
1997	Cloned	Steve Rinker	Television film
1997–2003	Just Shoot Me!	Elliot DiMauro	149 episodes
2000	3rd Rock from the Sun	Frankie	Episode: "Frankie Goes to Rutherford"
2001	The Outer Limits	Michael Burr	Episode: "Think Like a Dinosaur"
2001	James Dean	Elia Kazan	Television film
2002–2004	Kim Possible	Dr. Cyrus Bortel (voice)	2 episodes
2003	Whoopi	Victor	Episode: "Pilot"
2003	Justice League	G. Gordon Godfrey (voice)	Episode: "Eclipsed"
2003	Missing	Charles Denton	Episode: "White Whale"
2003	Stargate SG-1	Burke	Episode: "Evolution: Part 2"
2004	Century City	Frank Summers	Episode: "Sweet Child of Mine"
2004	Monk	Joe Christie	Episode: "Mr. Monk and the Employee of the Month"
2004–2007, 2019	Veronica Mars	Keith Mars	72 episodes
2007	CSI: Crime Scene Investigation	Preston	Episode: "Leapin' Lizards"
2007	Numb3rs	Ben	Episode: "Chinese Box"
2008	Brothers & Sisters	Evan	Episode: "Compromises"
2008	Céline	René Angélil	Television film
2008–2012	Flashpoint	Sgt. Gregory Parker	Lead role; 75 episodes
2009	ZOS: Zone of Separation	Speedo Boy	TV miniseries
2009	Party Down	Gordon McSpadden	Episode: "Willow Canyon Homeowners Annual Party"
2010	Cra$h & Burn	Danny DeRossi	Episode: "Lawyers, Guns & Money"
2010	Bones	Micah Leggat	Episode: "The Doctor in the Photo"
2011	The Kennedys	J. Edgar Hoover	TV miniseries; 3 episodes
2011–2016	Person of Interest	Charlie Burton/Carl Elias	23 episodes
2013	Cracked	Mike De Soto	Episode: "Fallen"
2013	Malibu Country	Leslie Sallinger	Episode: "Marriage, Malibu Style"
2013	Warehouse 13	Anthony Bishop	Episode: "The Big Snag"
2013	Hot in Cleveland	Julian	Episode: "All My Exes"
2014–2015	Remedy	Allen Conner	Lead role; 20 episodes
2014–2016	The Mysteries of Laura	Captain Dan Hauser	3 episodes
2014	Republic of Doyle	Donny Pearl	Episode: "Smash Derby"
2015	Rookie Blue	K-9 Unit	Episode: "Perfect Family"
2016–2018	iZombie	Detective Lou Benedetto	3 episodes
2016	Powers	Senator Bailey Brown/Cobalt Knight	4 episodes
2016	American Gothic	Mayor Conley	4 episodes
2017	Ransom	Joe Morris	Episode: "Joe"
2017	Madam Secretary	Jim Fox	Episode: "Convergence"
2017	Bad Blood	Bruno Bonsignori	5 episodes
2017	Travelers	Vincent Ingram	5 episodes
2018	The Good Fight	Patrick Basehart	2 episodes
2020	Westworld	Whitman	3 episodes
2021	The Hot Zone: Anthrax	Rudy Giuliani	Episode: "Hell's Chimney"
2021	A Christmas Letter	Robert Marino	Television film
2021	Ghosts	Michael Davenport	Episode: "Possession"
2021	Under the Christmas Tree	Dad	Television film
2021–2022	Station Eleven	Brian	Recurring role, miniseries
2021	Private Eyes	Chief Cutler	Episode: "Angie Get Your Gun"
2024–present	Allegiance	Cpl. Vince Brambilla	Main role
2024–2025	The Trades	Jimi	Main role
2024–2025	English Teacher	Grant Moretti	Main role
2025	Suits LA	Himself	Episode: "Batman Returns"
2025	FUBAR	Reed	7 episodes

=== Video games ===
Year(s)	Title	Role(s)	Notes
2024	Indiana Jones and the Great Circle	Father Antonio Morello	Also provided motion-capture

=== Web series ===
Year(s)	Title	Role(s)	Notes
2016	Carmilla	Sherman Hollis	Season 3, recurring role

=== As director ===
Year	Title	Notes
2014–2015	Remedy	2 episodes
2017–2018	iZombie	2 episodes
