= Un-American Graffiti =

- Veronica Mars episode
- Episode no.: Season 3 Episode 16
- Directed by: John T. Kretchmer
- Written by: Robert Hull
- Production code: 3T5816
- Original air date: May 1, 2007

Guest appearances
- Anthony Azizi as Rashad Krimani; Carole Raphaelle Davis as Sabirah Krimani; Jack McGee as Mr. Murphy; K. C. Clyde as Deputy Gills; Azita Ghanizada as Amira Krimani; Haaz Sleiman as Nasir Ben Hafayid; Adam Rose as Max; Cole Williams as Derrick Karr; Eric Ladin as Derrick's Brother; Fred Stoller as One-Hour Photo Clerk

Episode chronology
← Previous "Papa's Cabin"	Next → "Debasement Tapes"
- Veronica Mars season 3

"Un-American Graffiti" is the sixteenth episode of the third season of the American mystery television series Veronica Mars, and the sixtieth episode overall. Written by Robert Hull and directed by John T. Kretchmer, the episode premiered on The CW on May 1, 2007. The series depicts the adventures of Veronica Mars (Kristen Bell) as she deals with life as a college student while moonlighting as a private detective.

In this episode, Veronica is hired by an Arab couple who own a Middle Eastern restaurant because their restaurant has recently had the word "terrorist" spray-painted on it. Meanwhile, Keith (Enrico Colantoni), as acting Sheriff, looks into underage drinking regulations in local bars after the case of a drunk 19-year-old getting hit by a motorist comes to Keith's attention, eventually finding that Veronica is handing out convincing fake IDs to her fellow students. In addition, Veronica attends a birthday party run by Logan (Jason Dohring) for his new girlfriend Parker (Julie Gonzalo).

"Un-American Graffiti" was the first episode of the series not to be part of a larger story arc. This was a change that had been decided upon midway through the season, and series creator Thomas thought that this would make the series more accessible to new viewers. In addition, the episode aired after a two-month hiatus, during which period Thomas created the idea for season four taking place in the FBI Academy.

In its original broadcast, the episode garnered 2.35 million viewers and generally negative reviews from television critics, with many criticizing the case-of-the-week as cliché and moralistic. Eric Goldman of IGN compared the episode negatively to an after school special, while Rowan Kaiser, writing for The A.V. Club, disliked the portrayal of Rashad.

== Plot synopsis ==
Logan invites Veronica to Parker's birthday party. A woman (Carole Raphaelle Davis) comes into Mars Investigations and says that her restaurant was vandalized. Veronica stakes out the restaurant before the owner's husband (Anthony Azizi) comes out and berates her to leave. However, while they are speaking, a group of troublemakers appear and shoot paintballs at Veronica and the married couple. The husband acquiesces to allow Veronica to investigate both incidents further. Keith, as acting Sheriff, is called in to look into a case involving a 19-year-old who was hit while returning home drunk from a bar using an obviously fake ID. Veronica tracks down the family of the car that was used in the paintball incident and finds that it is under the control of a group of young people. Keith's underlings state that the bars are actually good at keeping out minors. Veronica reviews security cameras at the restaurant and tracks a person who turns out to be a Jewish student with whom the restaurant owner's daughter has been having an secret relationship.

An employee of the restaurant named Nasir (Haaz Sleiman) has taken explicit photos of the two, and Amira's father will disown her if he finds out. Veronica goes to a late-night one-hour photo counter and retrieves the photos before Nasir can collect them, but one had been stuck in the printer partially developed and Nasir gets it. Amira's father shows up at her door, berates her and fires Veronica, although she says that her real employer is his wife. Keith catches Wallace and Piz, out for a night on the town, in a bar, discovering that they have high-quality fake IDs from Veronica, leading Keith to reprimand her. Veronica discovers the true vandal, Derrick (Cole Williams), after tracking a piece of bait. He spraypainted the restaurant after seeing Nasir distributing a piece of anti-American propaganda at a mall. Both owners want to meet Derrick before pressing charges. Keith sends Piz (Chris Lowell) and Wallace (Percy Daggs III) with clearly fake IDs into a bar as a test of his deputies. He finds that the deputy does not check closely and resents Keith as well. Afterward, Keith fires the deputies who disobeyed his orders.

The two restaurant owners meet with Derrick, who does not react politely to them. However, they decide not to turn in Derrick. The husband/father has an awakening about Amira as well and forgives her, turning in Nasir to the police for an expired visa. At Parker's party, Mac (Tina Majorino) connects with Max (Adam Rose), and Veronica shows mild jealousy when Piz shows her his new fling. Logan gets Parker a romantic cake. In order to escape from an awkward suitor whom Logan introduces her to, Veronica asks Piz to pretend to be her boyfriend. Afterwards, Wallace informs her that Piz does have a crush on her. Veronica realizes that she has not realized this because of her preoccupation with her breakup with Logan. She talks to Piz on the deck at the party, and he suddenly kisses her. Piz retreats to the elevator, but Veronica appears and kisses him back. The elevator opens, revealing Logan.

== Production ==
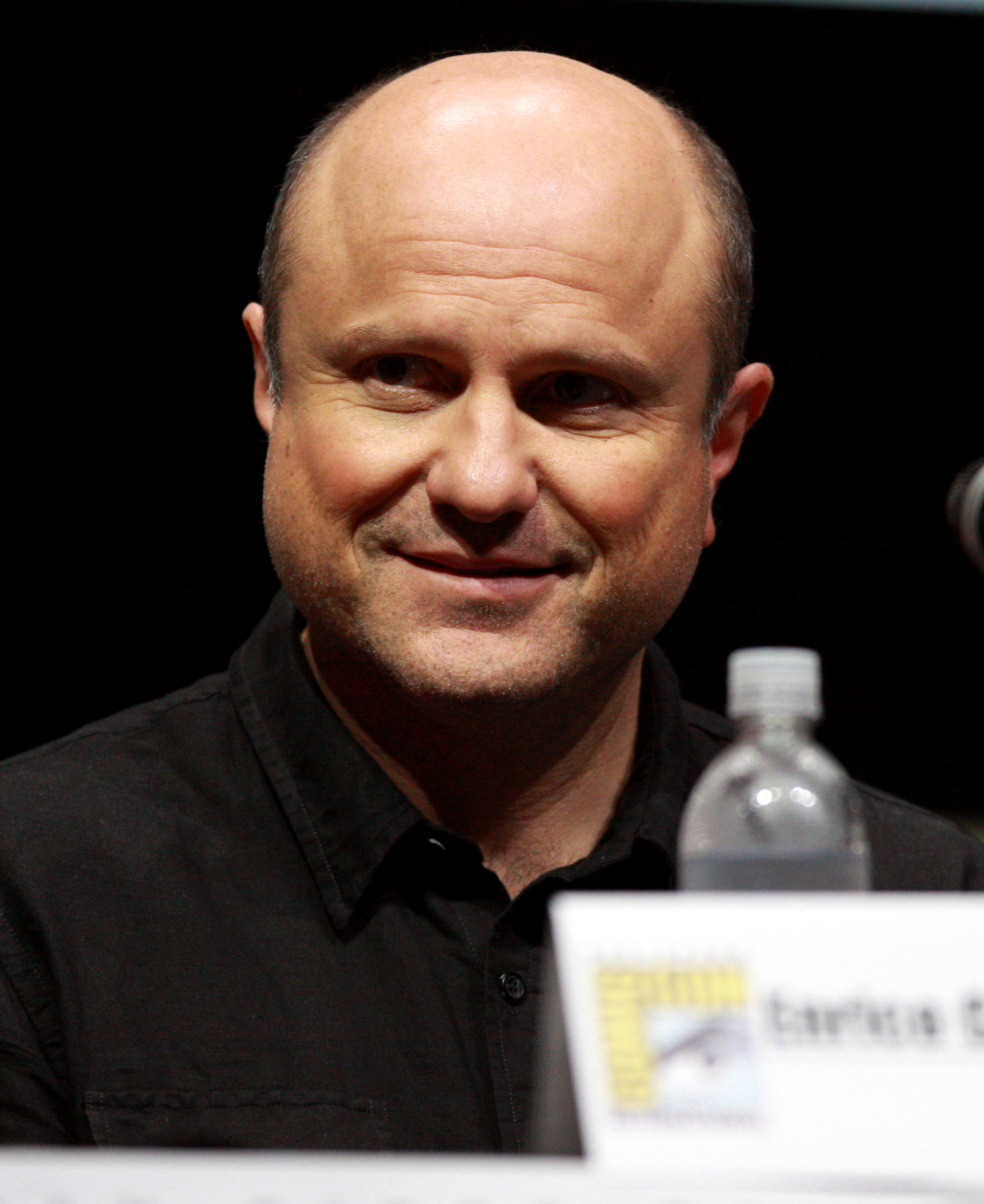
Enrico Colantoni stated prior to the airing of the episode that The CW had seen Thomas's FBI pitch for the next season and rejected it, a comment that was denied by both Thomas and a network representative.

"Un-American Graffiti" was written by Robert Hull and directed by John T. Kretchmer, marking Hull's second and final writing credit (after "Show Me the Monkey") and Kretchmer's fourteenth and final directing credit for the series. "Un-American Graffiti" introduces a romantic storyline between Mac (Tina Majorino) and Max (Adam Rose). Max had appeared in three previous episodes—his introduction as the student who sells Wallace his "study guide" in "President Evil", as a suspect in "Hi, Infidelity" and as the main client in "Poughkeepsie, Tramps and Thieves". From the very beginning of his appearances, Max was planned to begin a romantic relationship with Mac. Rose was roommates with the other main love interest for her, Bronson Pope (Michael Mitchell). When Rose received the call that he would be appearing in more episodes for a romantic storyline with Mac, Rose stated, "But I thought that's what my roommate was doing."

"Un-American Graffiti" is the first episode of Veronica Mars not to be part of a broader story arc in the form of a mystery that Veronica solves over several episodes. The crew's plan at the beginning of the season was to have the two-part murder mystery of Hearst's basketball coach, encapsulated in "Postgame Mortem" and "Mars, Bars", to stretch over the rest of the season beginning with this episode, but this idea was changed around the airing of "Spit & Eggs". Series creator Rob Thomas gave two rationales for the creative change. The first was that he believed that the story arcs alienated new or casual viewers, meaning that the change would solve the series' low Nielsen ratings, while the other reason was that he noticed that after the first season, the show had garnered the most narrative criticism about the story arcs. On trying the new narrative structure, Thomas stated, "It seems like a good time to do it—a good fun test balloon. Try it over five [episodes] and see how fans and non-fans react." However, Thomas also commented that the show would continue to exhibit a degree of serialization through Veronica's romantic and personal life. In addition, the new story formula was a way to have episodes focus on Veronica's personal life instead of devoting most of the episode time to advancing rushed mysteries.

The episode also features the first kiss of the characters of Piz (Chris Lowell) and Veronica, creating a love triangle between the two and Logan (Jason Dohring) that would last for the rest of the series and the Veronica Mars movie, dividing fans into "Team Logan" and "Team Piz", depending on which relationship they preferred. The song "Rally" by alternative rock band Phoenix plays during Veronica and Piz's kiss. Thomas highlighted the scene in Veronica returns home to find Keith reading classified ads as one of his favorite moments between the father/daughter pair in the season, stating that they both fulfilled the writers' initial vision for the scene and that Kristen Bell in particular interpreted her lines well.

The episode was the first to air after nearly a two-month hiatus, during which Thomas came up for the idea for season four to take place in the FBI Academy. This was possibly done as a last-resort attempt to save the show from cancellation, as the series was very much on the brink of cancellation at this point in production. Prior to the airing of "Un-American Graffiti", Enrico Colantoni stated that The CW had seen the filmed first ten pages and reacted negatively. However, Thomas denied this and commented that The CW had not yet seen the FBI pitch and would on May 2, the day after the series' return, a statement that was confirmed to be true by a representative for the network. Prior to the episode's airing, information was released stating that middle school students would be involved in the episode, leading BuddyTV to speculate that Logan's young friend from "Postgame Mortem" would make an appearance.

== Reception ==
=== Ratings ===
In its original broadcast, "Un-American Graffiti" received 2.35 million viewers, ranking 95th of 98 in the weekly rankings. This was a decrease from the previous episode, "Papa's Cabin", which garnered 2.66 million viewers.

=== Reviews ===
"Un-American Graffiti" received generally negative reviews from television critics, with many criticizing the case-of-the-week as cliché and moralistic and opining that it was not a strong start for the show's new episode formula. Eric Goldman of IGN graded the episode a 7.0 out of 10, indicating that it was "good". He was very critical of the case-of-the-week and Keith's plotline as Sheriff, comparing them both negatively to an after school special. He disliked what he considered to be the cliché storyline and stereotyped characters of the restaurant plot, particularly the trope of the disapproving Arab-American father and the plotline ending with a speech about the American dream, concluding that "even Veronica pointing out this cliché didn't make it less so." While opining that Logan's actions were out of character, the reviewer was more positive towards the budding relationships of Veronica and Piz and Mac and Max. Television Without Pity graded the episode a "C", with the reviewer stating that it was the only episode of the series that they did not like. Reviewer Alan Sepinwall, on his blog What's Alan Watching?, was very negative towards the episode. While stating that it was very preachy and generally boring, particularly in the case-of-the-week, he believed that the episode was just a fluke because he had already been sent the next episode, "Debasement Tapes", which he enjoyed. While being less critical of the episode's other subplots, he concluded that "this wasn't exactly [a] triumphant return."

Kelly West of Cinema Blend was mixed towards the episode. While calling the new formula "a breath of fresh air," she was not entirely pleased with the final scene featuring Piz and Veronica's kiss, opining that the location and the fact that Veronica ran after Piz and kissed him back were not in keeping with Veronica's character. Rowan Kaiser, writing for The A.V. Club was also critical of the case of the week and the episode in general. While admiring the show's decision to address the controversial issue of Islamophobia in the United States, she did not like the show's characterization of Rashad, the father, noting inconsistencies about whether his storyline was one of redemption or not. "There are three seemingly equal interpretations: that Veronica Mars writers believe that the cartoon is worth ruining someone's life over; that Rashad is a complex character who can be petty and vindictive; or, it's just a bunch of stuff that happens and there is no moral."
