= I Know What You'll Do Next Summer =

- Veronica Mars episode
- Episode no.: Season 3 Episode 18
- Directed by: Nick Marck
- Written by: Jonathan Moskin; David Mulei
- Production code: 3T5818
- Original air date: May 15, 2007

Guest appearances
- Nelsan Ellis as Apollo Bukenya; Babs Olusanmokun as Kizza Oneko; Daran Norris as Cliff McCormack; Ken Marino as Vincent Van Lowe; Edi Gathegi as Zeke Molinda; Rodney Rowland as Liam Fitzpatrick; Adam Rose as Max; Michael Charles Roman as Wilson Behan; David Starzyk as Richard "Big Dick" Casablancas; William Bumiller as Mr. Lee

Episode chronology
← Previous "Debasement Tapes"	Next → "Weevils Wobble But They Don't Go Down"
- Veronica Mars season 3

"I Know What You'll Do Next Summer" is the 18th episode of the third season of the American mystery television series Veronica Mars, and the 62nd episode overall. Written by Jonathan Moskin and David Mulei and directed by Nick Marck, the episode premiered on The CW on May 15, 2007. The series depicts the adventures of Veronica Mars (Kristen Bell) as she deals with life as a college student while moonlighting as a private detective.

In this episode, when a Hearst student and former child soldier in Uganda named Apollo (Nelsan Ellis) publishes a memoir, Veronica receives a phone call from a man claiming to be his father. Meanwhile, Logan (Jason Dohring) and Dick (Ryan Hansen) plan to go on a surfing vacation in the summer, coming into conflict with several people. In addition, Piz (Chris Lowell) must decide between two summer internships.

"I Know What You'll Do Next Summer" incorporates the organization Invisible Children, Inc. into its storyline and includes a public service announcement for the group at the end of the episode. Hansen and Bell are celebrity supporters of the organization, and series creator Rob Thomas was inspired to devote an episode to the subject of child soldiers when Hansen gave him a book about Uganda the previous Christmas. In its original broadcast, the episode received 2.10 million viewers and generally positive reviews from television critics, with many praising the character development of Dick and the case-of-the-week.

== Synopsis ==
Veronica and Piz hang out at her house. Keith (Enrico Colantoni) tests Veronica on her upcoming private investigator exam, and Piz states that he is interviewing a former child soldier and Hearst student, Apollo, for his radio show. Keith informs his deputies that a robbery wave has been occurring. Piz interviews the student before telling Veronica that he has been offered an internship by Pitchfork Media. Veronica receives a 95% on the PI exam before being called by a man stating that Apollo is his son. Keith speaks to a suspect in some of the robberies and discovers that he is connected to the Fitzpatricks. Logan meets Parker's (Julie Gonzalo) parents, who are very uptight. Veronica speaks to Apollo, posing as a reporter for the school newspaper, finding that Apollo's mother's handwriting is very similar to the letter his father claimed to have from his mother.

Logan tells Parker that he will not be seeing her in the summer because he will be on a surfing trip with Dick. Mac (Tina Majorino) and Max (Adam Rose) spend all their time together. Piz tells Veronica about another internship in Neptune, but she dodges his attempts to ask which one he should take. Keith meets Liam Fitzpatrick (Rod Rowland), who states that the robberies will not stop. Apollo learns that Veronica was not assigned by the school paper, and Veronica tells him the truth, but he refuses a paternity test. Some people begin to grow dissatisfied with Keith's handling of the robberies, while Apollo's father claimant appears in Neptune. Veronica searches for Apollo, learning from his former roommate that Apollo did not actually write the book, and he was never a child soldier. However, Wallace (Percy Daggs III) urges her not to expose him as a hoax, as his book is actually helping charities that aid child soldiers. At the job fair, Wallace is seen signing up for Invisible Children, Inc.

Apollo tells Veronica that he actually does want the paternity test. Dick's father, who was involved in a corporate crime, appears and berates him for going on the surfing trip in the summer. Apollo takes the paternity test, but the father doesn't appear. However, Apollo informs Veronica that he actually was a child soldier, enlisting his former roommate to tell her that he wasn't so that he could ensure his father was genuinely loving. The only reason the father did not show up to the paternity test was that he was detained for having the wrong license plates. Apollo and the father meet at the Sheriff's office, where they have an emotional reunion. Dick angrily confronts his father, but the next time he is seen, he calls off his trip with Logan. Logan tells Parker this news, and she is disappointed. After seeing an ad for Vincent Van Lowe's campaign for sheriff, Veronica gets the news that she has been accepted into the FBI's internship program.

== Production ==
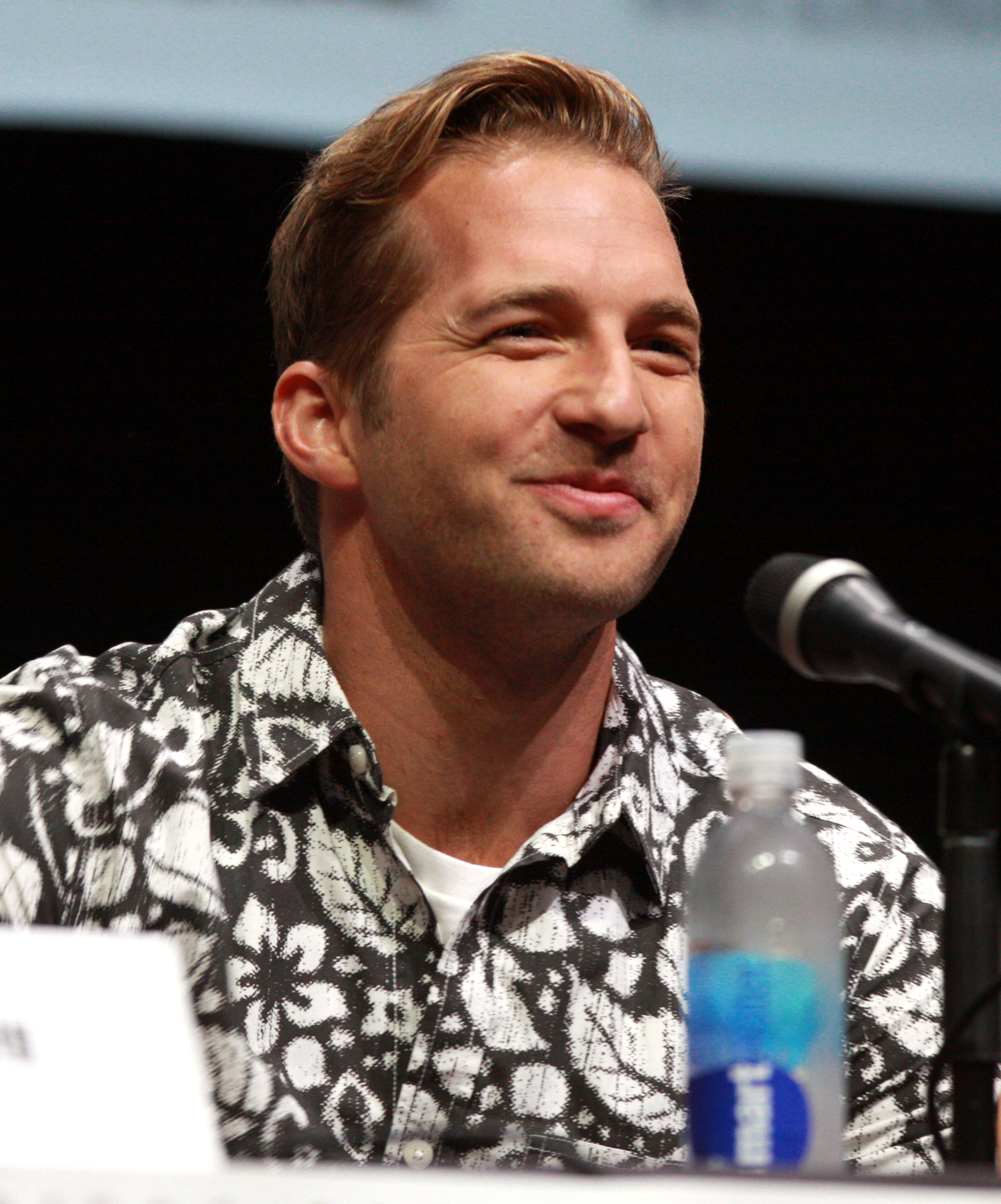
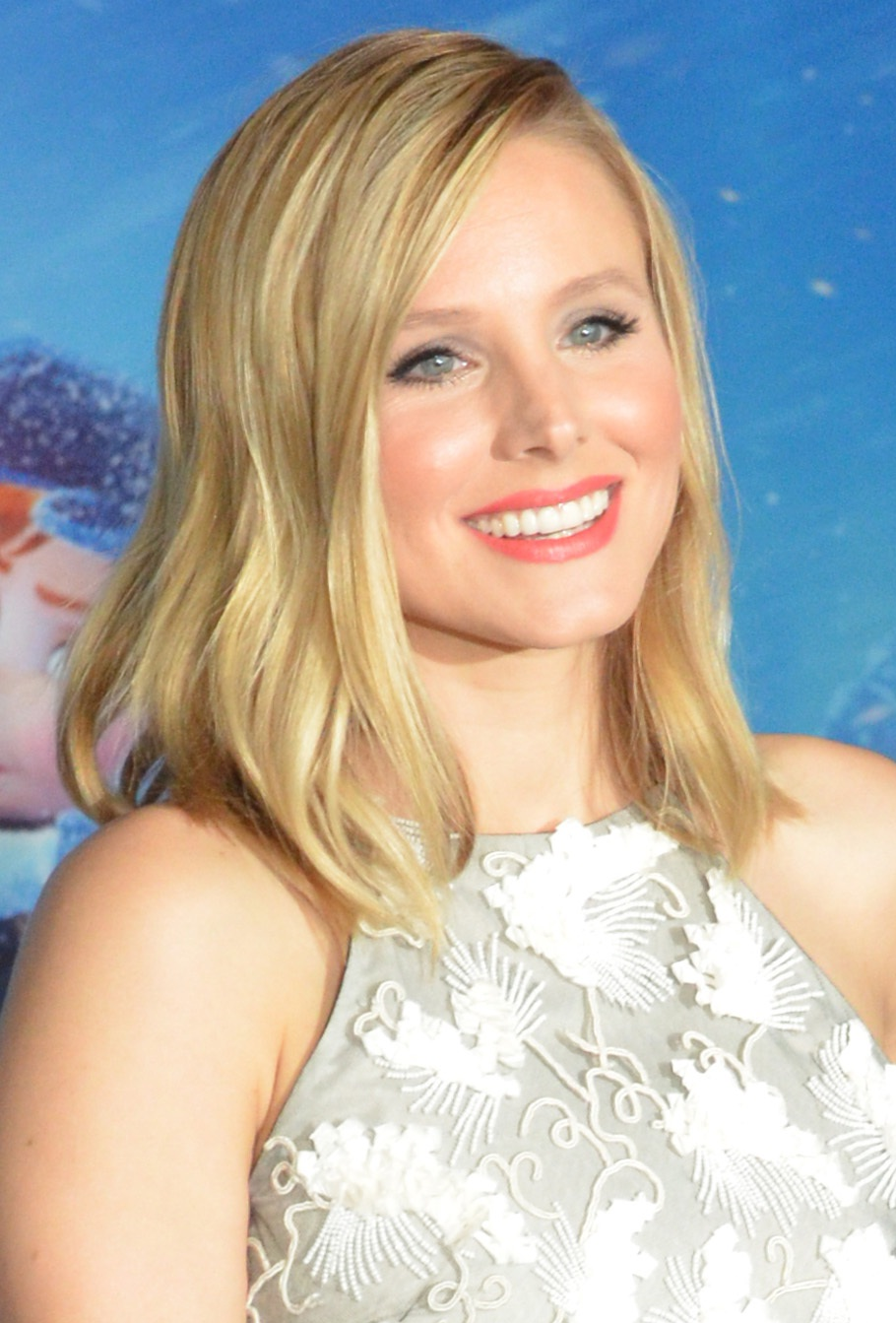
The organization Invisible Children prominently features in the episode; series regulars Ryan Hansen and Kristen Bell are supporters of the group.

"I Know What You'll Do Next Summer" was written by Jonathan Moskin and David Mulei and directed by Nick Marck, marking Moskin's third and final writing credit, Mulei's second and final writing credit, and Marck's tenth and final directing credit. The episode contains several references to the charity Invisible Children, Inc., which aims to increase awareness for the use of child soldiers in the Lord's Resistance Army in Uganda. The episode also ends with a public service announcement delivered by Jason Dohring, Kristen Bell and Ryan Hansen out-of-character. Bell is an active supporter of the organization, while Hansen is the brother-in-law of founder Jason Russell.

Series creator Rob Thomas was initially worried about including the reunion between Apollo and Kizza because he thought that such scenes did not play to his strengths as a storyteller. However, he was pleased with the result because of the two actors' performances. The two performers had never met each other prior to this scene, and they were filming within four minutes of setup time. One quip by Vinnie (Ken Marino) about the office's secretaries was a callback to a similar joke in "Of Vice and Men". Thomas was inspired to focus an episode on a former Ugandan child soldier by two incidents. The first was when he was initially informed about the situation by a former student of his mother's, while at Christmas the previous year, Hansen had given books about Ugandan child soldiers to all the writers. In the episode, Apollo is scheduled to appear on The Oprah Winfrey Show; Oprah's Book Club was discussing a book about a child soldier at the time, but this was a coincidence. In the episode, Piz states that he has been given an internship with Pitchfork Media at their headquarters in New York City; however, the location is incorrect.

== Reception ==
=== Ratings ===
In its original broadcast, "I Know What You'll Do Next Summer" received 2.10 million viewers, ranking 87th of 90 in the weekly rankings. This was an increase in roughly 250,000 viewers from the previous episode, "Debasement Tapes", which earned 1.85 million viewers.

=== Reviews ===
The episode received generally positive reviews from television critics, many of whom praised the case-of-the-week and the character development of Dick Casablancas. Eric Goldman of IGN graded the episode an 8.8 out of 10, indicating that it was "great". He lauded the episode's handling of its political subject matter and the return of older storylines. He argued that "I Know What You'll Do Next Summer" used its political message much better than "Un-American Graffiti", which aired two weeks prior; he thought that this episode's story made its political message more subtle than the previous episode. The reviewer also enjoyed the development of Dick's character that occurred with the return of his father, stating that the scene in which Dick yelled at his father "an excellent moment that helped bring a lot of new shading to the funny, but usually one-note character." Keith's storyline was another center of praise, with the reviewer stating that he thought the Fitzpatricks' plot line had been too rushed earlier in the season. Tanner Stransky of Entertainment Weekly was generally positive as well, noting the romantic uncertainty between Veronica and Piz, Logan and Parker, and Mac and Max, drawing parallels between this aspect of the episode and the series' uncertain future. In addition, the reviewer thought highly of Dick's confrontation with his father and the case-of-the-week. Television Without Pity graded the episode a "B+".

In a review written during the success of the film campaign Kony 2012 on the internet, Rowan Kaiser of The A.V. Club thought that she found himself frequently comparing the episode's treatment of child soldiers with the discussion of Invisible Children at the time. "This isn't a bad thing. It's a representation of how television, like any art form, can have multiple meanings, which evolve over time." However, the reviewer knew that Apollo was not going to be a fraud given the cast members' support of the organization. The reviewer also praised Hansen's reaction to his father's return. Kelly West of Cinema Blend wrote that "tonight's episode of 'Veronica Mars' was a cornucopia of emotions."
