= Postgame Mortem =

- Veronica Mars episode
- Episode no.: Season 3 Episode 13
- Directed by: John Kretchmer
- Written by: Joe Voci
- Production code: 3T5813
- Original air date: February 13, 2007

Guest appearances
- Matt McKenzie as Coach Tom Barry; Jonathan Chase as Josh Barry; Juliette Goglia as Heather Button; Jaime Ray Newman as Mindy O'Dell; Robert Ri'chard as Mason; Daran Norris as Cliff McCormack; Patrick Fabian as Professor Hank Landry; Jeremy Roberts as Mel Stoltz; Tracey Needham as Mrs. Kathleen Barry

Episode chronology
← Previous "There's Got to Be a Morning After Pill"	Next → "Mars, Bars"
- Veronica Mars season 3

"Postgame Mortem" is the thirteenth episode of the third season of the American mystery television series Veronica Mars, and the fifty-seventh episode overall. Written by Joe Voci and directed by John T. Kretchmer, the episode premiered on The CW on February 13, 2007. The series depicts the adventures of Veronica Mars as she deals with life as a college student while moonlighting as a private detective.

The episode is the first of two episodes to deal with the murder of the basketball coach at Veronica's school Hearst College, Tom Barry (Matt McKenzie). In this episode, Veronica tries to clear the coach's son, Josh (Jonathan Chase) of charges of his murder. Meanwhile, Logan (Jason Dohring), heartbroken from his breakup with Veronica in "There's Got to Be a Morning After Pill", ends up babysitting the eleven-year-old sister (Juliette Goglia) of one of his friend Dick's (Ryan Hansen) paramours, and they begin to emotionally connect with each other. In addition, Veronica and Keith find out that two of the main suspects' alibis do not match.

"Postgame Mortem" was one of series creator Rob Thomas's favorite episodes of the season. In particular, a scene in which Logan and Heather run into Veronica in an elevator was Thomas's favorite of the year, praising Goglia's performance in the scene and episode. In addition, Dohring contacted Rob Thomas to discuss his character's development. The episode received 2.37 million viewers and mixed reviews from critics, with many praising the case-of-the-week and being more mixed on the Logan–Heather subplot. Rowan Kaiser of The A.V. Club referred to Heather as a non-sexualized Manic Pixie Dream Girl, while Alan Sepinwall believed that it worked well comedically and dramatically.

== Plot synopsis ==
The Hearst basketball coach, Tom Barry, berates his team, including Wallace (Percy Daggs III), after a game, and the coach's son quits as a result. One of Logan's teachers tells Dick that Logan must start attending classes. Dick sneaks into Logan's apartment for the hotel staff and finds it a mess. Veronica works at Mars Investigations for the day and walks in to find the Coach's family in the office, as the Coach has died. The son who quit, Josh, is the prime suspect, but the family suspects Mel Stolz (Jeremy Roberts) or one of the PCH bikers. Dick tries to set up Logan on a double date before realizing that one of the "twins" is actually eleven years old. Dick and the older sister leave, leading Logan to babysit the other sister, Heather (Juliette Goglia) although Logan just goes to bed. Keith talks to Mel Stolz, who says that he was on a plane at the time. Dick calls Logan and says he is in Las Vegas, leaving Logan to babysit Heather for another day.

Weevil (Francis Capra) organizes a meeting between Veronica and the PCHers, and the new leader says that they would not kill someone over a bad car like the Coach's vehicle. Mason (Robert Ri'chard), one of the team's former star basketball players, testifies to Sheriff Lamb (Michael Muhney) that Josh is responsible for his father's death. The Sheriff arrests Josh, and Veronica learns that the Coach's car was found in the water. Logan and Heather begin to actually enjoy each other's company. Keith speaks to Mindy O'Dell (Jaime Ray Newman), stating that he will continue to search for Dean Cyrus O'Dell's killer. Veronica questions Mason, but he ends up angrily walking away. Veronica and Keith compare notes, and Keith says that Cyrus's car was taken out within the timeframe of the murder. Heather sends a radio request to play a special song from Logan to Veronica, while Veronica interrogates the hotel staff. One of them says that he heard two men yelling in the room. Veronica and Logan have a chance meeting in the elevator.

Hank Landry (Patrick Fabian) tells Veronica that she has successfully applied for the first part of an FBI internship with the help of a recommendation from the Dean. Keith questions Mrs. O'Dell heavily, and she subsequently fires him from the case, although he says that he will not stop investigating. Veronica visits Josh in jail, who suspects Mason. Dick returns, getting a divorce from the older sister, and Logan and Heather remain friends. In Veronica's criminology class, she is arrested for aiding Josh to escape from prison.

== Production ==
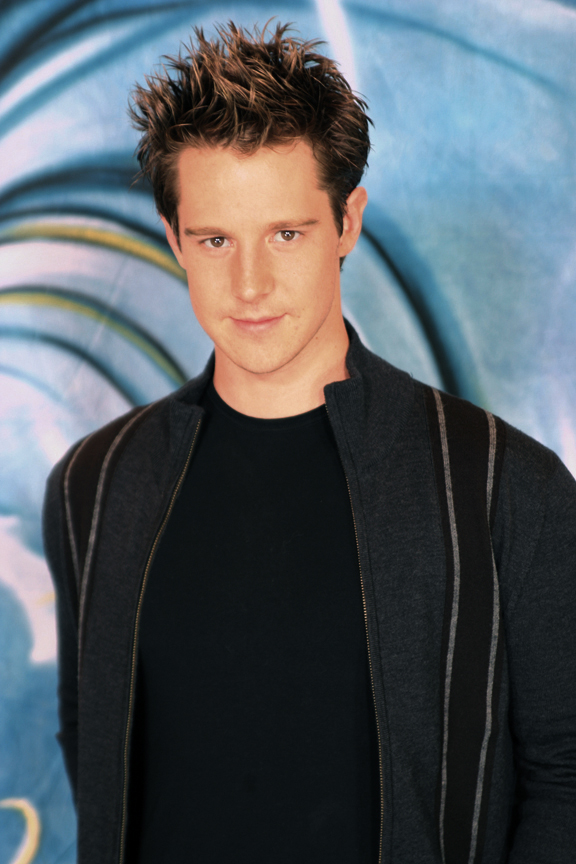
Jason Dohring (pictured) called Thomas due to questions about Logan's continual broken heart; Thomas responded that the character choice was made to set up this episode's subplot.

"Postgame Mortem" was written by Joe Voci and directed by John T. Kretchmer, marking Voci's first writing credit and Kretchmer's thirteenth directing credit. The episode was one of series creator Rob Thomas's favorite episodes of season three, along with "Of Vice and Men", "Show Me the Monkey", "Poughkeepsie, Tramps and Thieves", and "Mars, Bars". The DVD for the season contains one deleted scene of the episode. It depicts Veronica going into the police station and asking Sheriff Lamb about Josh's recent arrest. Thomas explained in his introduction to the scene that while it was initially written for its comedic value, it became "an example of staging killing the comedy". He explained that Lamb had to frequently turn all the way around to speak to Veronica and Deputy Sacks (Brandon Hillock), a fact which he thought made the scene awkward.

Thomas described the scene in which Veronica encounters Logan and Heather in an elevator before Heather tells her that Logan is in love with her as his favorite scene of the season and that it lived up to high expectations. In writing this subplot, Thomas and the crew started with this scene and "wrote backwards" in order to make it fit in with the rest of the episode's story. Knowing the scene's importance to the writers, Kretchmer used more lighting setups than would be typically used in an elevator scene. Thomas also enjoyed Juliette Goglia's performance in both the scene and the episode, referring to her as "a star". Immediately prior to this episode, Thomas received a call from Jason Dohring, the actor of Logan, who was confused about the character's continual state of grief following his breakup with Veronica. Thomas responded that that part in his character arc was all setup to the subplot involving Heather.

== Reception ==
=== Ratings ===
In its original broadcast, "Postgame Mortem" received 2.37 million viewers, ranking 102nd out of 104 in the weekly rankings. This was a slight decrease from the figures of the previous week's episode, "There's Got to Be a Morning After Pill", which earned 2.40 million viewers.

=== Reviews ===
BuddyTV lauded the episode, writing that it was one of the best Veronica Mars episodes in months, mainly due to the reappearances of Wallace, Weevil, and Cliff, leading to what the reviewer called "an old school Veronica Mars feel".Logan and Heather's subplot also garnered praise: "It's a nice departure from the oft repeated scenario of Logan exercising indiscretion." Rowan Kaiser of The A.V. Club gave a positive review, praising the case of-the-week and the episode's development of the Dean O'Dell mystery. She argued that this story arc was the best of the series so far, writing "What makes this third season's second mystery work is that it is so balanced. […] It's a closed system with multiple possibilities." She was also intrigued by the case-of-the-week, noting that it stood out from others because it was not resolved within the episode. However, she was negative towards the Heather–Logan subplot and dynamic, referring to Heather as a type of Manic Pixie Dream Girl who is not sexualized. "Heather is so ridiculously contrived as a way to help Logan out of his funk that it's almost embarrassing." Television Without Pity graded the episode an "A", stating that "I'm all for anything that gets Veronica and Keith working together on a big case."

Reviewer Alan Sepinwall, on his blog What's Alan Watching?, praised the decision to include a multiple-week mystery. He thought that spreading the case out allowed the episode to focus on the main story arc and Logan's subplot as well as allow the main mystery time to finish. He was also complimentary towards the Logan–Heather plotline, lauding Goglia's performance; he also stated that the episode gave him renewed interest in the Dean O'Dell case. Eric Goldman, writing for IGN, rated the episode a 7.7 out of 10, indicating that it was "good". He was highly critical of the subplot involving Logan and Heather, stating that it "rode the line of insufferable". While opining that it had some good comedic moments, he thought that the majority of the subplot involved heavy use of clichés. However, he was more mixed to positive towards the case-of-the-week. The reviewer felt a sense of anticipation that this storyline did not resolve itself in the episode: "it's hard not to be anxious to see where this is going."
