= Veronica Mars season 3 =

Veronica Mars
- Season 3
- DVD cover
- Starring: Kristen Bell; Jason Dohring; Percy Daggs III; Ryan Hansen; Julie Gonzalo; Chris Lowell; Tina Majorino; Michael Muhney; Francis Capra; Enrico Colantoni
- No. of episodes: 20

Release
- Original network: The CW
- Original release: October 3, 2006 – May 22, 2007

Season chronology
- ← Previous; Season 2 Next → Season 4

The third season of Veronica Mars, an American drama television series created by Rob Thomas, began airing on The CW in the United States on October 3, 2006. The season was produced by Warner Bros. Television, Silver Pictures Television, Stu Segall Productions, Inc and Rob Thomas Productions, and Joel Silver, Diane Ruggiero and Thomas served as executive producers. The third season comprises 20 episodes and concluded its initial airing on May 22, 2007.

The season continues the story of Veronica Mars (Kristen Bell), now a freshman studying at Hearst College while moonlighting as a private investigator under the wing of her detective father. The first mystery is established when her friend Parker Lee (Julie Gonzalo) becomes the latest victim of the Hearst serial rapist in a storyline begun in a second-season episode. Feeling guilty for not helping her, Veronica sets herself to catching the rapist. The next mystery, a murder, commences in the same episode that the identity of the rapist is discovered.

To increase viewership, the third season format was changed to include two separate mysteries that would be introduced and resolved in a series of non-overlapping story arcs. Three of the regulars in the second season were written out of the series, two new characters were introduced and two others were upgraded from recurring roles. The third season received generally mixed critical reviews compared to previous seasons.

== Cast ==
The third season features a cast of ten actors who receive billing, an increase from the nine actors in the second. Kristen Bell portrays the titular Veronica Mars, a college student and skilled private detective. Jason Dohring plays Logan Echolls, Veronica's love interest. Ryan Hansen plays Logan's obnoxious friend Dick Casablancas. Percy Daggs III portrays Wallace Fennel, Veronica's best friend and frequent partner in solving mysteries. Francis Capra portrays Eli "Weevil" Navarro, the previous leader of the Pacific Coast Highway (PCH) biker gang and Veronica's friend. Enrico Colantoni plays Veronica's father Keith Mars, a private investigator and former Balboa County Sheriff.

Cindy "Mac" Mackenzie and Don Lamb, recurring characters in the first two seasons, were upgraded to series regulars in the third. Mac, portrayed by Tina Majorino, was a computer expert befriended by Veronica. Lamb, portrayed by Michael Muhney, was the Balboa County Sheriff who won the office from Keith in the recall election. The third season introduces two new series regulars, Julie Gonzalo portrays Parker Lee and Chris Lowell plays Stosh "Piz" Piznarski. Piz, named after the director of the pilot, Mark Piznarski, was created so that Veronica could have a male friend of middle-class status rather than of upper-class. He is Wallace's roommate and a friend of Veronica, and his campus radio show serves as a narrative device to capture the mood of the university. Parker is Mac's extroverted roommate at Hearst College and "everything that [she] is not", according to Thomas.

Regular characters who did not return for the third season were Duncan Kane (played by Teddy Dunn), who left the country with his daughter midway through the second season, Jackie Cook (Tessa Thompson), who returned to New York, and Cassidy Casablancas (Kyle Gallner), who died by suicide in the season two finale.

== Episodes ==
Veronica is still living at home with her father Keith, and Piz and Parker are introduced as the respective roommates of Veronica's friends Wallace and Mac. Weevil takes a job at Hearst as a maintenance man, while Lamb continues to serve as Sheriff. During the season, Keith begins an affair with a married client, Wallace struggles to balance academics and sports, Mac begins dating again after previous failed relationships, and Dick has a breakdown and appeals to Logan for help. The season chronicles Veronica and Logan's failing attempts to maintain their relationship in the face of Veronica's mistrust.

No. overall	No. in season	Title	Directed by	Written by	Original release date	Prod. code	U.S. viewers (millions)
45	1	"Welcome Wagon"	John Kretchmer	Rob Thomas	October 3, 2006	3T5801	3.36
The fall term at Hearst College starts and Veronica and Logan are dating. Veronica is still living at home, and Mac and Wallace each have roommates. Wallace's roommate Piz asks Veronica to recover his stolen possessions. Veronica sneaks into Parker and Mac's darkened room to retrieve an item, and successfully avoids disturbing what she thinks is consensual sex. Parker later awakens from her drugged stupor to find her head shaved, and Veronica is horrified to realize she unintentionally allowed Parker to be raped.
46	2	"My Big Fat Greek Rush Week"	John Kretchmer	Diane Ruggiero	October 10, 2006	3T5802	2.96
Guilty over not having helped Parker, Veronica pursues the Hearst serial rapist by going undercover at the Theta Beta sorority during rush week. Parker's parents arrive, intending to take her home. Wallace and Logan participate in a guard/prisoner experiment for sociology class. On the night she was raped, Parker was taken back to her dorm room by a resident assistant because she was too intoxicated to get back herself. Veronica also learns that someone from Theta Beta could have had access to the keys to Parker's dorm room.
47	3	"Wichita Linebacker"	Harry Winer	Phil Klemmer & John Enbom	October 17, 2006	3T5803	3.12
To help Weevil stay out of prison, Veronica convinces her father to give him a job at Mars Investigations. A Hearst football player loses the team playbook and, with his scholarship at stake, hires Veronica to find it. Veronica fights with Logan after she discovers that he chose to gamble with his friends instead of spending time with her. The Dean of Hearst threatens to expel Veronica unless she reveals her sources for a sorority article she wrote. Claire, one of the girls of Lilith House, a center of feminist activism, is raped.
48	4	"Charlie Don't Surf"	Jason Bloom	Diane Ruggiero & Jason Elen	October 24, 2006	3T5804	3.33
Logan asks Veronica and Keith to discover why his trust fund money is disappearing. With a court hearing approaching, Dick and the Pi-Sigs hire Veronica to prove their innocence, to the chagrin of Parker and the other rape victims. Keith's friend Harmony hires him to prove her husband is cheating, and the two grow close. Veronica investigates Claire's rape, and learns that she was with a man the night that she was raped.
49	5	"President Evil"	Nick Marck	Jonathan Moskin & David Mulei	October 31, 2006	3T5805	2.70
Veronica attends Mercer's Halloween party at the campus casino, but before Logan arrives, the party is robbed by armed men wearing masks modeled after past United States presidents. Weevil is arrested for the crime, but Veronica suspects he has been framed when it is revealed that the loot was dumped and the guns were not real. Keith looks for the ex-husband of the Dean's wife as a possible bone marrow donor for her critically ill son. Veronica finds out that the man Claire was with the night of her rape is her boyfriend; however, she claims that she does not know him.
50	6	"Hi, Infidelity"	Michael Fields	John Enbom	November 7, 2006	3T5806	2.75
Veronica is accused of plagiarizing her criminology research paper. Seeking to clear herself, she discovers that Professor Landry is having an affair with Dean O'Dell's wife. Wallace is pardoned by the Dean for cheating on his exam, but resigns from the basketball team to focus on his studies. Piz invites Veronica to a night of bowling and she decides to bring Logan and Parker, unaware Piz wanted the evening to be more of a date. Veronica learns that the Lilith House rape was faked, and no hair or DNA from the rapist had been found at the crime scenes. Mercer is arrested after Parker recognizes his cologne to be the rapist's, and Veronica finds clippers in his room.
51	7	"Of Vice and Men"	Harry Winer	Phil Klemmer	November 14, 2006	3T5807	2.69
Increasingly frustrated by what she sees as dishonesty by Keith, Logan, and Professor Landry, Veronica withdraws from all of them. While staying at Wallace and Piz's dorm room, she meets a girl trying to locate her missing boyfriend. Professor Landry offers Veronica an internship with the FBI, Keith breaks up with Harmony after being blackmailed by Vinnie Van Lowe, and Mercer is cleared of being the rapist by providing an alibi - being live on air with his radio show. After being drugged at the food court, Veronica almost becomes the rapist's latest victim as she collapses in a car park, but he is frightened off by Logan arriving at the scene.
52	8	"Lord of the Pi's"	Steve Gomer	Diane Ruggiero	November 21, 2006	3T5808	2.57
Keith and Veronica are hired to find the missing granddaughter of the founder of Hearst College. They learn that the granddaughter's swing vote could spell the end of fraternities and sororities at Hearst. Logan fears for Veronica's safety as she continues to investigate the campus rapes. The girls at Lilith House explain that they faked Claire's rape to help shut down the Greek houses on campus, which they believed were responsible for the real rapes. Patty Hearst guest stars as a Hearst College trustee called "Selma Hearst Rose".
53	9	"Spit & Eggs"	Rob Thomas	Rob Thomas	November 28, 2006	3T5809	3.44
Logan offers Veronica a choice, but neither option is beneficial for their relationship. To salvage their friendship, Logan dumps Veronica as a girlfriend. Under pressure, Dean O'Dell reinstates the Greek system. Veronica discovers the identity of the Hearst rapist after a Pi Sig fraternity party, but also finds herself in trouble. Keith tells Dean O'Dell about his wife's affair, and Weevil finds him dead hours later from a gunshot wound. Logan attacks a police car to get arrested and exact vengeance on the rapist for attacking Veronica.
54	10	"Show Me the Monkey"	Nick Marck	Story by : John Enbom; Teleplay by : John Enbom & Robert Hull	January 23, 2007	3T5810	3.23
Six weeks later, Dean O'Dell's death has been ruled a suicide. Mindy O'Dell asks Keith to investigate the Dean's death because his insurance policy does not cover suicide. Mac and Veronica go undercover as animal rights activists to find a missing lab monkey. Veronica talks to Piz about not letting things slip by, not realizing that he is trying to ask her out. Logan is upset after breaking up with Veronica and she realises that she wants Logan back in her life and shows up at his door and the pair decide to get back together.
55	11	"Poughkeepsie, Tramps and Thieves"	John Kretchmer	Diane Ruggiero	January 30, 2007	3T5811	2.69
A classmate asks Veronica to locate the woman he loves; she is later revealed to be a sex worker. Keith continues his investigation of Dean O'Dell's murder by visiting the Lilith House girls. Veronica asks Logan some difficult relationship questions, and learns he had sex with someone else while they were split up but accepts it. Keith learns that three of the Lilith House girls were in the area of the Dean's office around the time of his murder, which was egged by unknown assailants.
56	12	"There's Got to Be a Morning After Pill"	Tricia Brock	Story by : Jonathan Moskin & David Mulei; Teleplay by : Jonathan Moskin & Phil Klemmer & John Enbom	February 6, 2007	3T5812	2.40
A student asks Veronica to find out who slipped her RU-486, which caused a miscarriage. While searching through Tim Foyle's computer, Veronica discovers that he is also investigating Dean O'Dell's murder, which took place at around 2:20 am. Upon learning that Logan slept with Madison Sinclair after their first break up, Veronica breaks up with him. Keith discovers that Mindy's car was egged on the night of the Dean's murder, which suggests that she was lying about her whereabouts at the time.
57	13	"Postgame Mortem"	John Kretchmer	Joe Voci	February 13, 2007	3T5813	2.37
Logan is upset after Veronica breaks up with him, so Dick invites two girls over to cheer him up, but Logan has to babysit an eleven-year-old girl instead. Keith and Veronica discover that the alibis given by Mindy O'Dell and Professor Landry do not match. Wallace rejoins the Hearst basketball team right before the coach is found dead. His widow hires Keith to investigate the murder and clear her son Josh. When Josh escapes from prison, Veronica is arrested for allegedly being his accomplice.
58	14	"Mars, Bars"	Harry Winer	Story by : Phil Klemmer & John Enbom & Joe Voci; Teleplay by : Phil Klemmer & John Enbom	February 20, 2007	3T5814	2.27
Without any evidence to hold her, Sheriff Lamb releases Veronica from jail. Keith learns that the coach's wife hired Vinnie Van Lowe to find out if her husband was having an affair, while Josh makes contact with Veronica and insists that he is being framed for his father's murder. Logan joins Mac and Parker on a Valentine's Day scavenger hunt, and draws closer to Parker. Lamb attempts to apprehend a suspect without waiting for backup, and is killed.
59	15	"Papa's Cabin"	Michael Fields	John Enbom	February 27, 2007	3T5815	2.66
Keith, again appointed sheriff after Lamb's death, interrogates Mindy O'Dell, who reveals that the third man in her hotel room the night of the Dean's murder was Dean O'Dell himself. Veronica and Tim set out to prove Professor Landry's innocence, and Veronica ends up uncovering the real murderer.
60	16	"Un-American Graffiti"	John Kretchmer	Robert Hull	May 1, 2007	3T5816	2.35
Veronica is hired by a Middle Eastern restaurant owner to find out who has been vandalizing his family business. When a drunken teenager stumbles from a bar and gets hit by a car, Keith orders his deputies to conduct surprise ID checks. While doing his own surprise search, Keith catches Piz and Wallace using fake IDs provided by Veronica. Logan decides to throw a birthday party for Parker, where Veronica and Piz kiss.
61	17	"Debasement Tapes"	Dan Etheridge	John Enbom	May 8, 2007	3T5817	1.85
Piz escorts aging rock star Desmond Fellows (Paul Rudd guest stars) before a benefit concert for the radio station. When Fellows' irreplaceable backing tapes go missing, Piz recruits Veronica to locate them. Vinnie Van Lowe files to oppose Keith in the special election for sheriff.
62	18	"I Know What You'll Do Next Summer"	Nick Marck	Jonathan Moskin & David Mulei	May 15, 2007	3T5818	2.10
Veronica passes the Private Investigator license exam, while Piz interviews Apollo Bukenya, an African student at Hearst who wrote a book about his years as an orphan child-soldier. Veronica is hired by an African man to help prove that he is Apollo's father, but her investigation risks exposing Apollo as a fraud. Meanwhile, as the election nears, Keith fights a crime spree in Neptune. Parker consults Veronica for advice about Logan.
63	19	"Weevils Wobble But They Don't Go Down"	Jason Bloom	Phil Klemmer	May 22, 2007	3T5819	1.78
Weevil is arrested for selling fake debit cards, but claims he is being framed and asks Veronica for help. On Piz's radio show, Keith debates Vinnie Van Lowe about the upcoming election, while Dick drunkenly apologizes to Mac for the way he has treated her. Veronica and Piz make up after their argument, and a sex tape of them is posted on the internet. Dick shows the sex tape to Logan who thinks Piz filmed the act without Veronica's knowledge and beats him up at his radio show.
64	20	"The Bitch Is Back"	Michael Fields	Rob Thomas & Diane Ruggiero	May 22, 2007	3T5820	2.15
Angry that Logan attacked Piz, Veronica tells him to leave her alone. Parker confronts Logan about his continuing feelings for Veronica and breaks up with him, while Piz assures Veronica that he had nothing to do with the sex video. Veronica, with Weevil's help, investigates how the tape originated and discovers Jake Kane is linked to The Castle and pays him a visit. Logan apologizes to Veronica for attacking Piz and beats up the real culprit in the cafeteria after which he apologizes to Piz.

== Reception ==
=== Critical response ===
Reviews of the third season were mixed compared to the previous two seasons. Maureen Ryan of the Chicago Tribune praised Bell's performance, who she said deserved the "truckload of glowing press notices for her work as the tightly wound, emotionally resilient young detective". Ryan thought Veronica's relationship with Keith was "one of the best, if not the best, parent-child relationship on television", and described Logan and Veronica's on-screen chemistry as "sizzling". Stephanie Zacharek of Salon.com felt that although the third season "wasn't the strongest", it did show that Veronica Mars "could not only survive but continue to find ways to reinvigorate itself". Zacharek liked newcomer Piz, and realized how much she was going to miss the character Dick. Melanie McFarland of the Seattle Post-Intelligencer felt that Veronica Mars "easily has a few more seasons left in it", and described the writing as "unfailingly hysterical and clever". McFarland praised the cast as "without a doubt one of the most likable on television", and called Dohring "the most beloved of the bunch".

Keith McDuffee of TV Squad deemed the season "disappointing", mainly because the episodes offered nothing new: "most fans of Veronica Mars felt that season three was clearly its weakest". Eric Goldman of IGN said that the main issue was the shift in the overall tone, with a lighter feeling than the previous seasons. Goldman believed that Logan had been most affected by the tone change; he was robbed of his darker aspects and changed into an "increasingly extraneous character". The reviewer felt that despite the concerns over the final five episodes, the series ended with "three very strong episodes, with lots of strong dialogue". Goldman concluded that although third season "was very choppy", it still had "plenty of witty dialogue and a continually engaging performance by Kristen Bell as the title character". The Pittsburgh Post-Gazette opined that Veronica Mars had taken a dive "creatively", from "the mopier version of its theme song to stalled storylines". The reviewer felt that "the arcing mysteries had grown less convincing and compelling as time went on and were too drawn out". Fox News Channel's Bridget Byrne pointed out that Veronica had "gone from punky to—dare we say—preppy" in the third season.

The review aggregator website Rotten Tomatoes reported an approval rating of 89% with an average score of 8.13/10, based on 18 reviews. The website's critics consensus reads, "The third season of Veronica Mars continues to highlight the show's simple brilliance, offering more of the witty banter and quote-worthy dialogue the series is known for."

=== Ratings and awards ===
The third-season premiere was watched by 3.36 million American viewers, an increase from the 2.42 million viewers who viewed the second-season finale. Ratings remained stable for the first ten episodes, and the ninth episode featured the most viewers of the season with 3.44 million. Beginning with the eleventh episode, ratings dropped to a consistent viewership of a mid-2 million per episode, and the final episode before the hiatus was watched by 2.66 million viewers. When the series returned from its hiatus, viewers had decreased to 2.35 million, and the final two episodes garnered only 1.78 and 2.15 million viewers respectively.

The third season averaged 2.5 million viewers for all 20 episodes. Out of all regular primetime programming that aired during the 2006–2007 American television season, Veronica Mars ranked 138th out of 142, according to the Nielsen ratings system. The third season was nominated for two awards: Kristen Bell was nominated for the Saturn Award for Best Actress on Television, and the series was nominated for the Writers Guild of America Award for On-Air Promotion (Radio or Television).

== Distribution ==
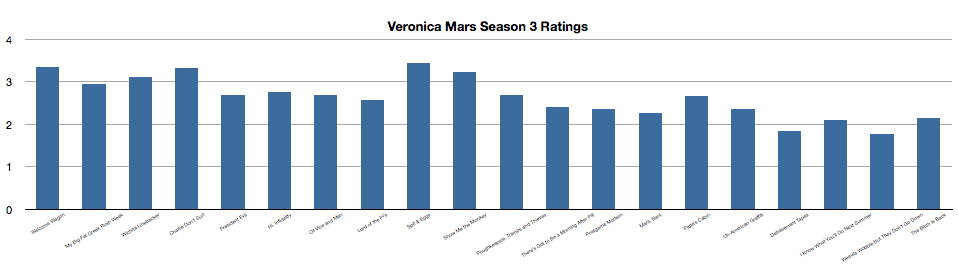
A bar graph of the US ratings for the third season.

The first two seasons of Veronica Mars aired on UPN; however, in 2006, CBS Corporation and Warner Bros. decided to merge UPN and The WB into The CW. Paul Maguire, the spokesman for The CW, said that the series was picked up because "the critics are behind it and our research has consistently shown that Gilmore shared more audience commonality with Veronica than with any other show from UPN, except Top Model".

The third season was released in the US under the title Veronica Mars: The Complete Third Season as a widescreen six-disc Region 1 DVD box set on October 23, 2007, Region 2 on December 12, 2008, and Region 4 on February 11, 2009. In addition to all of the aired episodes, DVD extras included unaired scenes with introductions by Rob Thomas, a gag reel, and a webisode gallery with cast interviews and various set tours. Also included were the featurettes, "Going Undercover with Rob Thomas" commentary and "Pitching Season 4", an interview with Thomas discussing a new direction for the series that picks up years later, with Veronica as a rookie FBI agent.

The third season was simulcast in Canada by Fox 44. The series had previously been broadcast in Canada by the CTV Television Network and Sun TV. Despite airing the series to low ratings in the previous seasons, the United Kingdom's Living decided to air the series' third season. Network Ten began airing the third season in Australia on March 30, 2007. The series went on hiatus after the fourth episode on April 20, 2007, and resumed on the newly created Ten HD in 2008. The finale was aired on April 8, 2008. The third season was broadcast in New Zealand by TV2.

== Cancellation and future ==
At the 2007 CW Upfront, CW's then network president, Dawn Ostroff, announced that Veronica Mars was not part of the new primetime lineup and was "not coming back". When asked if the series could continue with the FBI concept, Ostroff said that the series was completely gone "in any form". Upon the cancellation of the series, a group of fans calling themselves the "Cloud Watchers" sent more than 10,000 Mars bars to the CW, hoping that the network would reverse its decision and renew the series.

Thomas stated that he was interested in writing a feature film based on the series, in the interest of providing closure to the storylines and character arcs. In September 2008, Thomas told Entertainment Weekly that "I thought I had the idea broken, but I've hit a wall in the final act that I haven't quite figured out". Thomas explained that he was very busy writing for Cupid and Party Down, both of which he created. In January 2009, TV Guide reported that the film was Thomas' first priority after Cupid. Thomas noted that as well as writing the script, someone would need to pay for the film, but indicated that producer Joel Silver was ready to green-light the film. In late March, Thomas stated that although the film was not green-lit by the studio, the possibility was still there. Thomas revealed that the film would take place before Veronica's graduation, and feature Wallace, Logan, Mac and Weevil.

A film continuation, released in early 2014, was confirmed after a successful Kickstarter campaign launched by Rob Thomas which raised over $5.7 million.

In September 2018, an eight-episode fourth season was confirmed by Hulu, which was released on July 19, 2019.
