= Papa's Cabin =

- Veronica Mars episode
- Keith finds murder suspect Hank Landry alone on a boat. What appears to be a blue tarpaulin in the background was actually a blue screen initially intended to show the ocean. However, due to budgetary concerns, the crew decided to leave it unused.
- Episode no.: Season 3 Episode 15
- Directed by: Michael Fields
- Written by: John Enbom
- Production code: 3T5815
- Original air date: February 27, 2007

Guest appearances
- Patrick Fabian as Hank Landry; James Jordan as Timothy Foyle; Jaime Ray Newman as Mindy O'Dell; Jesse James as J. D. Sansone; Dendrie Taylor as Mrs. Sansone; Ed Begley, Jr. as Dean Cyrus O'Dell

Episode chronology
← Previous "Mars, Bars"	Next → "Un-American Graffiti"
- Veronica Mars season 3

"Papa's Cabin" is the fifteenth episode of the third season of the American mystery television series Veronica Mars, and the fifty-ninth episode overall. Written by John Enbom and directed by Michael Fields, the episode premiered on The CW on February 27, 2007. The series depicts the adventures of Veronica Mars (Kristen Bell) as she deals with life as a college student while moonlighting as a private detective.

In this episode, Veronica and her father Keith (Enrico Colantoni) investigate more suspects in the murder of Dean O'Dell (Ed Begley, Jr.), particularly his wife Mindy (Jaime Ray Newman) and her lover Hank Landry (Patrick Fabian). Both of them become particularly suspicious when they disappear, and Hank is implied as the killer when Mindy's dead body washes onshore. However, Veronica later deduces that teaching assistant Tim Foyle (James Jordan) committed the murder to frame Hank.

"Papa's Cabin", the final episode of the Dean O'Dell story arc, marks the final appearances of Fabian, Newman, and Jordan in their respective roles. Series creator Rob Thomas enjoyed Fabian and Jordan's performances in the episode, while filming of scenes on the ocean contained some production troubles. Upon its initial airing, the episode received 2.66 million viewers and mixed reviews from television critics; many considered this episode to be a solid conclusion to the story arc but one that was less exciting than previous mystery-ending episodes. Rowan Kaiser of The A.V. Club believed that the episode was intellectually satisfying, while Jon Lachonis of BuddyTV opined that the decision to make Tim the murderer was not appropriate.

== Plot synopsis ==
Despite the fact that Hank Landry is a prime suspect for Keith, Landry reassures Veronica that she can still be his protégé. Keith continues to question Mindy O'Dell, citing inconsistencies in her testimony. Mindy says that the other man arguing in her room was the Dean. She also says that Hank could have been the murderer, as she was not in the area at the time of the murder. Keith enters Veronica's criminology class and arrests Hank. Keith questions him as well, and he says that Mindy set him up with the blood on his clothes, noting that he went to a convenience store before driving home. However, Keith puts him in a cell, where he is visited by Tim Foyle, and Hank tells him to find the bug that was placed on his phone. Later, Veronica sees Tim breaking into Mars Investigations, trying to find the bug, and Tim effectively enlists Veronica's help. They visit the convenience store with no luck for the time being. Wallace (Percy Daggs III) sees Logan (Jason Dohring) and Parker (Julie Gonzalo) having lunch together and tells Veronica, but she doesn't seem upset. Mindy buys a boat at the local pier. Keith and Veronica receive news that Mindy has left town.

Veronica and Tim investigate Hank's alibi further, and it checks out, leading to his release. Veronica and Tim find secret phone recordings kept by Hank. Veronica brings Keith the CD, but he informs her that Hank has disappeared as well. We see Hank showing up on Mindy's boat. While listening to the phone calls, Veronica notices Mindy and Hank talking about a place named "Papa's cabin". They investigate the most recent phone calls made by Hank, and find that his alibi was faked—he was helping the witness's son escape foster care. Keith comes up with the idea that Papa's cabin has something to do with Ernest Hemingway. Keith visits the cabin, a retreat in Mexico, before boarding the boat. He finds Hank, who says that she set him up. He says that he and Mindy had a fight, and Mindy fell overboard. We see Mindy's body washed up on a beach.

With Landry arrested, Tim takes over the criminology class. The class starts to discuss the Dean O'Dell case, with Tim giving a broad overview of the subject. However, Veronica asks several questions to him which he does not answer very well. Veronica suddenly connects the dots and says that Tim committed the murder in order to frame Hank, who denied him a job opportunity. Tim is arrested and confesses to the murder, while Hank is being tried for manslaughter in the death of Mindy. Keith and Veronica share dinner after solving their cases.

== Production ==
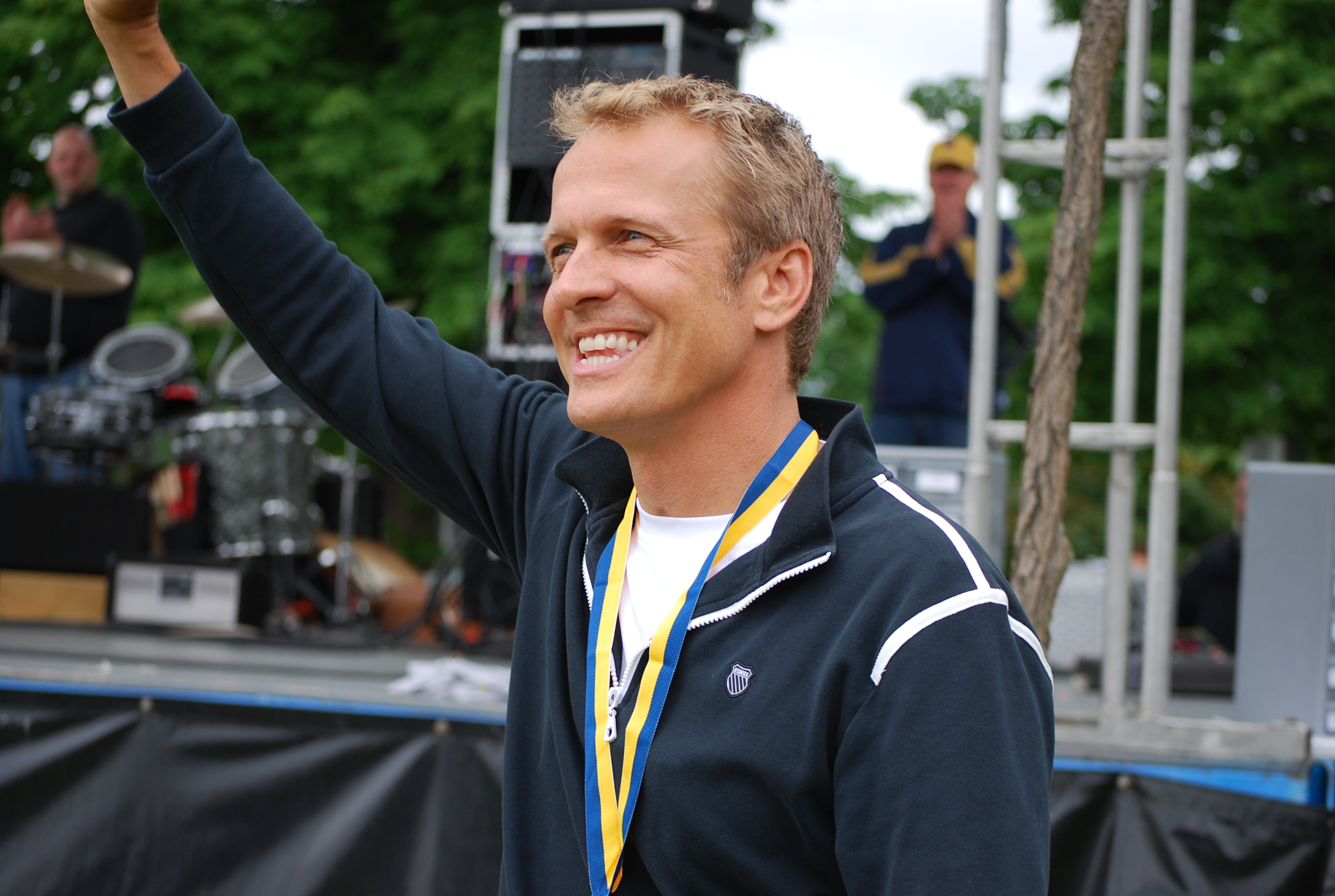
Patrick Fabian makes his final appearance as criminology professor Hank Landry in the episode. Thomas enjoyed his performance, stating that it was exemplary of why he cast the actor initially.

"Papa's Cabin" was written by John Enbom and directed by Michael Fields, marking Enbom's sixteenth and penultimate writing credit and Fields's seventh and penultimate directing credit for the series. "Papa's Cabin" features the final appearance of Hank Landry, played by Patrick Fabian, making it the closing installment of an eight-episode arc. The episode reveals that Tim Foyle (James Jordan) was the actual killer of Dean O'Dell, a mystery which had been the focus of the show for six episodes. Jordan had previously played a janitor named Lucky in season two; his new character was always meant to act as a foil to Veronica. In fact, scripts had initially named Tim Foyle as simply "Foil" for this reason. The nickname stuck, and his full name was chosen as a pun on tin foil. The episode was the final installment of the series to air before a two-month hiatus, temporarily losing its time slot to Pussycat Dolls Present. Ain't It Cool News considered the CW's description of the episode to be evidence that Veronica and Keith would continue working together, despite the fact that he recently became interim Sheriff.

Thomas enjoyed Fabian's performance in the episode, arguing that it was an example of the actor's scene stealer quality that led Thomas to initially cast him after his appearance in an episode of his earlier series Cupid. The scene in which Keith boards the ship on which Hank is located was difficult to film because there were limited daylight filming hours. The crew thought it was important for the audience to see the waves and the ocean. However, they were unable to finish filming the scene within the course of one day, so the crew made a quick decision to place a makeshift blue screen as part of the background for the interior of the boat. It was intended that the blue screen be edited in post-production in order to represent the ocean, but upon learning that this change would cost millions of dollars, the crew decided to forgo the alteration and instead pass off the blue screen as a tarpaulin.

Jordan had to wear a wig and a fake goatee for the episode. Thomas described Jordan's one-word response to the question "Do we look like we smoke?" as the best quip of the season. Thomas was also laudatory towards Jordan's character's reactions towards Veronica about events he secretly already knew, such as when he hears a voicemail from Hank not recommending him for an internship. He thought that he played the lie realistically but that one could see through his façade upon a repeat viewing. Because the Dean O'Dell storyline was six episodes instead of the initially scheduled seven, some plot strands had to be removed from the final episode and story arc.

== Reception ==
=== Ratings ===
In its original broadcast, "Papa's Cabin" received 2.66 million viewers, ranking 95th of 102 in the weekly rankings. This marked an increase in nearly 400,000 viewers from the previous episode, "Mars, Bars", which earned 2.27 million viewers.

=== Reviews ===
The episode received mixed reviews from critics, with reviewers generally calling "Papa's Cabin" a solid finale to the Dean O'Dell mystery but one that was less entertaining than previous mystery-ending episodes. Eric Goldman of IGN rated the episode an 8.2 out of 10, indicating that it was "great". He wrote that it was "an interesting episode that went against the grain as far as what the show has done with similar reveals in the past." While stating that Tim being the actual murderer was not very surprising, the reviewer felt satisfied with the scene in which Veronica pieces the clues together to implicate Tim. He also commented on how "Papa's Cabin" differed from previous mystery-ending episodes by having lower stakes, a characteristic he felt was appropriate. He thought it was similar to a traditional detective story model, meaning that it "fell in line with the feel of the show." However, he did not enjoy the fact that Fabian's character was being written out of the show. Rowan Kaiser, writing for The A.V. Club, lauded the episode. She referred to the conclusion of the Dean O'Dell story arc as the closure to a conventional mystery in the sense that Veronica and Keith slowly built up evidence instead of stumbling on one incriminating object by chance. The reviewer also thought that the episode provided an intellectually satisfying conclusion to the mystery and that it "maintains that level of involvement."

Jon Lachonis of BuddyTV sharply criticized the episode, opining that it was predictable, contrived, and unsatisfying. Calling the Dean O'Dell storyline "Veronica Mars's weakest mystery," the reviewer thought that "Papa's Cabin" spent too much time on Mindy and Hank, arguing that it was obvious they were not the culprits. In addition, he derided the decision to make Tim the murderer, stating that it was not true to his character. Television Without Pity graded the episode a "B". Alan Sepinwall, on his blog What's Alan Watching?, was mixed towards the episode, stating that it was "a solid resolution to the Dean O'Dell mystery", he thought more highly of the last several episodes. However, he criticized the fact that the mystery only lasted for six episodes, arguing that these smaller story arcs were not working well for the show, referring to this episode as feeling "rushed" due to the limited time to advance the mystery.
