= Juliette Goglia =

American actress

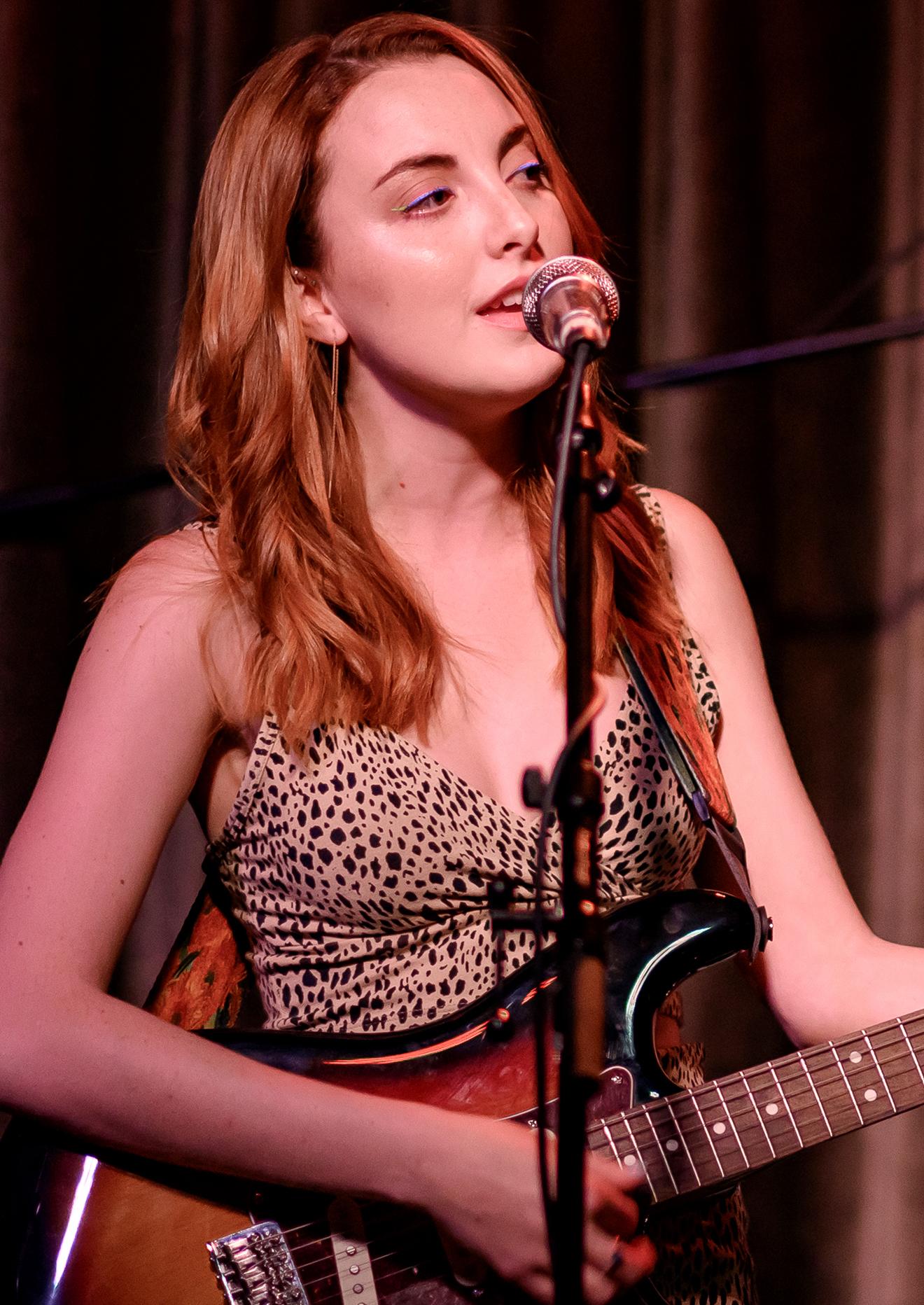
- Goglia in June 2019
- Occupations: Actress, musician, singer
- Years active: 2003–present
- Spouse: Thomas Archer (m. 2026)

Juliette Goglia is an American actress, singer and musician. She is best known for portraying Sierra in the Disney Channel series That's So Raven, Hannah West in the CBS series CSI: Crime Scene Investigation, and Eve Henry on The Michael J. Fox Show.

== Early life ==
Goglia's maternal grandfather was game show host and producer Mike Stokey. She has one older brother named Dante and one older sister named Emily.

== Career ==
Goglia made her film debut as Colleen O'Brian in the 2004 Hallmark Channel original film The Long Shot, followed by a minor role in the feature film Garfield: The Movie.

Goglia has appeared on several television shows, such as Joanie on Two and a Half Men and as Sierra on That's So Raven for two episodes each. Her longest-running television role to date is as one of the incarnations of God, referred to as "Little Girl God" on CBS's Joan of Arcadia. She was in eight episodes before the series was cancelled in April 2005.

Goglia played a child prodigy suspected of murder on CSI: Crime Scene Investigation and a teen suffering from seizures in the cancelled CBS drama 3 lbs. She also had a recurring role on the Fox drama Vanished, and appeared on Hannah Montana in the episode "Bye Bye Ball" as Angela. She also appeared in the Shake It Up episode "Match It Up" as Savannah, Deuce's (Adam Irigoyen) girlfriend. In 2013, Goglia played the character Eve Henry on The Michael J. Fox Show. She is also a singer-songwriter. She has recorded and written five songs: "Every Time I'm With You", "Into a Dream", "Crystal Ball", "Thought You Were The One", and "Inattention". She has also recorded a cover of the song, "Listen" from Dreamgirls. She also recorded a song with Post Modern Jukebox with her sister, Emily Goglia, a 40s style cover of the song "The Boy is Mine." She took part in Southern California's "Diva's: Simply Singing" in 2004. She was the recipient of "Female Vocalist of the Year" award at the 20th Annual Los Angeles Music Awards in 2010.

In February 2022, Goglia was a contestant on I Can See Your Voice, using the alias of "Hollywood Starlet."

On Sept. 17, 2025, Goglia performed the National Anthem at Dodger Stadium.

== Filmography ==
Film
Year	Title	Role	Notes
2004	The Long Shot	Colleen O'Brian	Television film
2004	Garfield: The Movie	Little girl	
2005	Crazylove	Jenny	
2005	Cheaper by the Dozen 2	Theater patron	
2007	A Grandpa for Christmas	Becca O'Riley	Television film
2009	Fired Up!	Poppy Colfax	
2010	Easy A	Young Olive Penderghast	
2011	Inside Out	Pepper Small	
2012	Stakeout	Sarah Stratton	Short film
2019	The Way You Look Tonight	Mia	
2023	Fog City	Chelsea	

Television
Year	Title	Role	Notes
2003–2005	Joan of Arcadia	Little Girl God	8 episodes
2004	Strong Medicine	Gaby Heely	Episode: "The Real World Rittenhouse"
2004	Two and a Half Men	Joanie	2 episodes
2004	That's So Raven	Sierra	Episode: "Stark Raven Mad", "Opportunity Shocks"
2005	ER	Sydney Carlyle	Episode: "The Human Shield"
2006–2007	CSI: Crime Scene Investigation	Hannah West	2 episodes
2006	Vanished	Becca Jerome	3 episodes
2006	Desperate Housewives	Amy Pearce	2 episodes
2006	3 lbs	Erica Lund	Episode: "The God Spot"
2007	Veronica Mars	Heather Button	Episode: "Postgame Mortem"
2007–2008	Ugly Betty	Hilary	3 episodes
2008	Hannah Montana	Angela Vitolo	Episode: "Bye Bye Ball"
2009	Private Practice	Sarah Pierce	Episode: "Do the Right Thing"
2010	Past Life	Sarah	Episode: "Saint Sarah"
2011	Shake It Up	Savannah	Episode: "Match It Up"
2012	The Finder	Melissa Welling	Episode: "Eye of the Storm"
2012–2013	Good Luck Charlie	Victoria	Episodes: "The Unusual Suspects", "Teddy and the Bambino"
2013–2014	The Michael J. Fox Show	Eve Henry	Main cast; 22 episodes
2014	Scandal	Mackenzie Miller	Episode: "Flesh and Blood"
2015	TMI Hollywood	Host / Various	Episode: "He's a Bird-Man!"
2015	Resident Advisors	Rachel	Main cast; 7 episodes
2016	Mike & Molly	Frannie	Episodes: "Baby Bump", "Baby, Please Don't Go"
2017	Doubt	Sophia Armstrong	Episode: "Not a Word"
2018	I Was A Teenage Pillow Queen	Lucinda	Television film
2018	The Neighborhood	Meadow	Episode: "Welcome to Game Night"
2020	The Magicians	Clarion	Episode: "Magicians Anonymous"
2021	9-1-1	Hudson Groupie	2 episodes
2022	I Can See Your Voice	Herself / Hollywood Starlet	Contestant
2022–2023	NCIS	Evelyn Shaw/Viktoria Valkov	3 episodes

== Discography ==
- I'm Not Sweet EP (2019)
