= There's Got to Be a Morning After Pill =

- Veronica Mars episode
- Episode no.: Season 3 Episode 12
- Directed by: Tricia Brock
- Story by: Jonathan Moskin; David Mulei
- Teleplay by: Jonathan Moskin; Phil Klemmer; John Enbom
- Production code: 3T5812
- Original air date: February 6, 2007

Guest appearances
- James Jordan as Tim Foyle; Jaime Ray Newman as Mindy O'Dell; Chris Ellis as Reverend Ted Capistrano; Carlee Avers as Bonnie Capistrano; Toni Trucks as Phyllis; Vince Grant as Thurman Randolph; Juliette Jeffers as Dr. Chambliss; Johnny Kastl as Eddie Nettles; Richard Grieco as Steve Batando

Episode chronology
← Previous "Poughkeepsie, Tramps and Thieves"	Next → "Postgame Mortem"
- Veronica Mars season 3

"There's Got to Be a Morning After Pill" is the twelfth episode of the third season of the American mystery television series Veronica Mars, and the fifty-sixth episode overall. Directed by Tricia Brock, with a story by Jonathan Moskin and David Mulei and a teleplay by Moskin, Phil Klemmer, and John Enbom, the episode premiered on The CW on February 6, 2007. The series depicts the adventures of Veronica Mars (Kristen Bell) as she deals with life as a college student while moonlighting as a private detective.

In this episode, Veronica aids a conservative Christian student named Bonnie Capistrano (Carlee Avers) in finding out who slipped her mifepristone, which caused a miscarriage. Meanwhile, Veronica becomes obsessed with Madison Sinclair (Amanda Noret) after becoming enraged that Madison and Logan (Jason Dohring) had sex while they were broken up. In addition, Veronica and Keith (Enrico Colantoni) discover new information about Dean O'Dell's death.

Series creator Rob Thomas had planned this case of the week for "There's Got to Be a Morning After Pill" since the beginning of the season as one of what he considered "college-age crimes". In addition, the subplot involving Logan and Veronica's breakup triggered a discussion in the writers' room about Veronica's character traits. The episode received 2.40 million viewers in its original broadcast and mixed reviews from television critics. Eric Goldman of IGN thought it was indicative of a general upward trend in the show's quality, while Rowan Kaiser of The A.V. Club thought it was uneven.

== Synopsis ==
Veronica has a dream that she woke up in the middle of the winter with Logan, but she is plagued with visions of Madison. When she wakes up, she goes to the Hearst library, where Tim Foyle's (James Jordan) girlfriend, Bonnie, asks her to investigate who slipped her RU-486, which caused a miscarriage. When Veronica presses Bonnie further, she reveals that Tim or Dick (Ryan Hansen) could be the father, although Tim has been very supportive. Veronica asks Logan point-blank whether Logan had sex with Madison over the winter, leading to a major fight, which ends when Veronica says she'll never forgive him. Veronica speaks to Bonnie's roommate, Phyllis (Toni Trucks), who reiterates that Tim is being very supportive. Veronica successfully breaks into Tim's office to investigate before realizing she doesn't have the password. After Keith comforts Veronica due to her breakup, she bugs Tim's office.

In her spare time, Veronica trails Madison out of envy. After ascertaining Tim's password, Veronica finds out that Tim is also investigating the Dean's suicide and that he was browsing a site named "Neptune Women's Clinic". Veronica visits the ministry of Bonnie's father, Ted (Chris Ellis) as well as the clinic, although neither really help in the case. She also questions Anthony, one of the witnesses of the Dean's death (he heard the gunshot). Returning home, Veronica is greeted by Keith, who has received a letter with images of Veronica exiting the clinic. For revenge, they visit the publisher of the photos, but it doesn't go well. Nevertheless, she does see a picture of one of Dick's paramours, although she was not as intimate with him as Veronica thought. In the middle of the night, Mindy O'Dell (Jaime Ray Newman) calls Keith, telling him to hurry. It turns out that Steve Botando (Richard Grieco) was trying to break in. While he is there, Keith finds out that Cyrus was planning on sending the O'Dell son to a disciplinary school and that Mindy was at the scene of Dean O'Dell's death.

Veronica starts to suspect one of the church officials, and a bookmark shows her that Bonnie's roommate was behind the RU-486. Bonnie begins to lash out at Phyllis, but her father holds her back and says that she should not be quick to anger. Veronica had previously hired Weevil to destroy Madison's car, but right before it is about to be crushed, she calls it off.

== Production ==
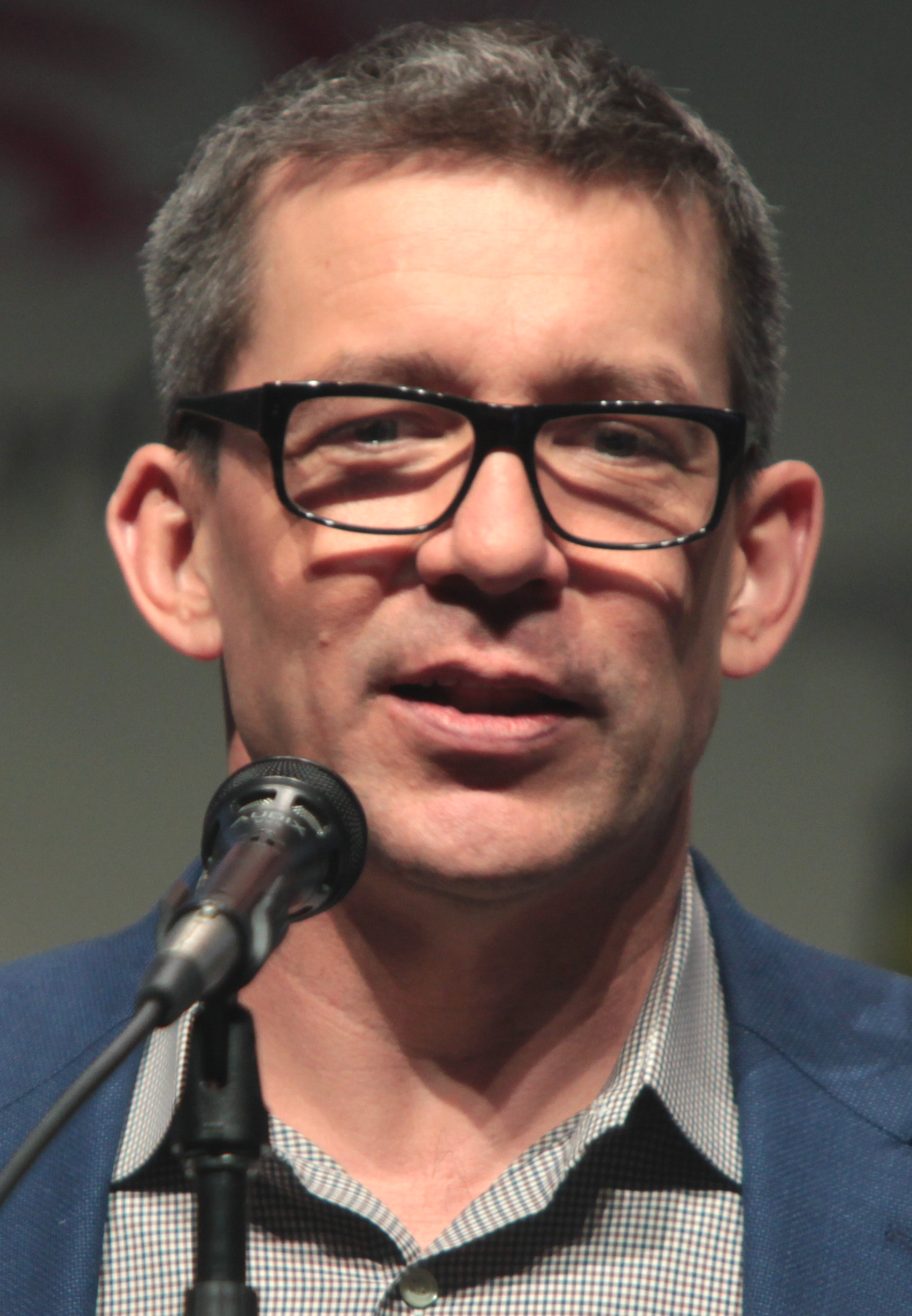
Rob Thomas had envisioned an episode with this case-of-the-week for the whole season.

"There's Got to Be a Morning After Pill" features a story by Jonathan Moskin and David Mulei and a teleplay by Moskin, Phil Klemmer, and John Enbom, marking Moskin and Mulei's second writing credits for the series, Klemmer's thirteenth writing credit for the show, and Enbom's fourteenth credit. It was directed by Tricia Brock, her only episode of Veronica Mars. The actor who played the witness to Dean O'Dell's death had previously appeared as an extra in "Spit & Eggs" during a party scene, nonverbally interacting with Piz (Chris Lowell). Series creator Rob Thomas enjoyed the cameo so much that he cast the actor as the witness character in this episode.

The scene in which Veronica rebuffs Logan for sleeping with Madison over winter break was the subject of a continuing debate in the writers' room about Veronica's character. Specifically, Enbom and Klemmer, two writers for the episode, thought that Veronica should be less mistrustful, paranoid and jealous, while executive producers Thomas and Diane Ruggiero advocated for these traits in Veronica. Thomas illustrated their creative differences by stating that he enjoyed the film Chasing Amy, while Enbom did not.

Thomas drew inspiration for his point of view about Veronica's character from his own life, stating, "I've sort of gotten past this, but I certainly lived in that space for a long time." Thomas had had the idea for this mystery of the week since the beginning of the season; in an interview, he stated that he would like to include several "college-age crimes" such as "this idea of a college girl getting pregnant, and someone getting the idea they're doing her a favor by slipping her RU-486." The promos for the episode made it seem as though Veronica was pregnant.

== Reception ==
=== Ratings ===
In its original broadcast, "There's Got to Be a Morning After Pill" received 2.40 million viewers, ranking 99th of 100 in the weekly rankings. This was a slight decrease from the previous episode, "Poughkeepsie, Tramps and Thieves", which garnered 2.69 million viewers.

=== Reviews ===
"There's Got to Be a Morning After Pill" received mixed reviews from television critics. Eric Goldman of IGN awarded the episode an 8.5 out of 10, indicating that it was "great." He thought that it was indicative of an overall upward trend in the quality of Veronica Mars and praised the episode's balance between the case-of-the-week and the Dean O'Dell story arc. "Like last week's episode, 'There's Got to Be a Morning After Pill' benefited from integrating already established characters into a mystery of the week." He was positive towards the mystery of the week in general, stating that it made him realize that it was possible to make good episodes with only a stand-alone mystery. However, he was critical of the development of Veronica and Logan's relationship, particularly Logan's new character traits. "Let's just hope they don't get back together again next week, or anytime soon, because this horse has been beaten to death as it is." Kelly West of Cinema Blend was positive towards the episode, calling it "jam-packed with drama". However, she stated that she would have enjoyed the episode more if Mac, Piz, Wallace, or Parker had made an appearance. Reviewer Alan Sepinwall enjoyed the pairing of Bonnie and her father, played by Chris Ellis.

Rowan Kaiser, writing for The A.V. Club gave a mixed review, criticizing the case-of-the-week and finding it indicative of a "wobbly" season. She thought that the case of the week was predictable, stating that it was clear that Bonnie's best friend was the culprit when the character was introduced. She also called the mystery "one of the weakest that the show has ever done." However, she thought that there were some interesting character development possibilities stemming from the episode. Television Without Pity gave the episode a "C+".
