= Debasement Tapes =

- Veronica Mars episode
- Episode no.: Season 3 Episode 17
- Directed by: Dan Etheridge
- Written by: John Enbom
- Production code: 3T5817
- Original air date: May 8, 2007

Guest appearances
- Paul Rudd as Desmond Fellows; Ken Marino as Vinnie Van Lowe; Max Greenfield as Leo D'Amato; Adam Rose as Max; Michael Mitchell as Bronson Pope; Lindsey McKeon as Trish Vaughn; Suzanne Cryer as Professor Grace Schaffer; Taylor Sheridan as Danny Boyd

Episode chronology
← Previous "Un-American Graffiti"	Next → "I Know What You'll Do Next Summer"
- Veronica Mars season 3

"Debasement Tapes" is the seventeenth episode of the third season of the American mystery television series Veronica Mars, and the 61st episode overall. Written by John Enbom and directed by Dan Etheridge, the episode premiered on The CW on May 8, 2007. The series depicts the adventures of Veronica Mars (Kristen Bell) as she deals with life as a college student while moonlighting as a private detective.

In this episode, Piz (Chris Lowell) gets the chance to interview one of the members of his favorite band, a washed-up rock star named Desmond Fellows (Paul Rudd). However, when Desmond's backing tapes that he needs for the show the next night disappear, Veronica is called in to find them. Meanwhile, Logan (Jason Dohring) enlists Mac's (Tina Majorino) help in creating a presentation for his business class. In addition, Keith (Enrico Colantoni) learns that Vinnie Van Lowe (Ken Marino) is challenging him in the upcoming Sheriff election.

"Debasement Tapes" features a guest appearance by Paul Rudd. A friend of series creator Rob Thomas and Enbom, they had hoped that Rudd would guest star on the show since its inception in 2004. Announced four months prior to the episode's airing, his appearance was highly anticipated by Thomas, who had high hopes for the pairing of Rudd and Enbom. In its original broadcast, the episode received 1.85 million viewers and mostly positive reviews from television critics, with Rudd's performance and the various subplots being generally well-received, although some disliked the main mystery.

== Plot synopsis ==
Veronica and Wallace (Percy Daggs III) watch a movie at her house. She questions him about Piz’s mood, while Keith enters and says he is currently unopposed in the Sheriff election. Piz runs up to Veronica and states that he has been chosen to be a guide for a rock star named Desmond Fellows. However, his show depends on some tapes Desmond is carrying with him, but when Piz checks him into his hotel room, they are missing. Piz calls Veronica for the case and runs into Logan in the elevator. Desmond points to several potential suspects. Logan asks Mac for study help, and she agrees. Piz starts his show with Desmond, and it goes terribly, as Desmond uses racial epithets and makes sexual advances. Veronica and Piz track down a teacher, who denies involvement, but the pair find a flyer for a group that threatened to boycott Desmond’s show. Piz and Desmond talk about his past and start to make progress, but he ends up going to a party with Dick (Ryan Hansen) instead of playing guitar with Piz.

Logan and Mac continue to make progress on his business school report, but Mac has to call Max (Adam Rose) to continue. Desmond goes skinny dipping at his party, while Mac and Max flirt in front of Logan. Veronica discovers that Desmond’s bag was actually switched with another person’s. Veronica and Piz retrieve it, and on the car ride home, they briefly discuss their kiss at the party before playing a CD with some of Desmond’s unreleased newer material. Keith reconnects with Leo D’Amato (Max Greenfield), who presents a case involving the Fitzpatricks to him. They stake out where the Fitzpatricks are, and Keith sees Vinnie Van Lowe helping them. However, they quickly learn that Vinnie is actually investigating the case and has trapped them in the store. Veronica and Piz supposedly get stuck in traffic and tell Desmond to play some of his newer songs until they get there, but they actually are at the concert venue and just want him to expose the audience to his solo material.

Desmond plays a show entirely of new songs, and the crowd loves it. Piz tells Desmond that he was there the whole time, but he does not react negatively. Mac, Max and Logan finish their report, but the professor cuts Logan off in the middle and dislikes it. Leo becomes a deputy again, while Vinnie enters the Sheriff’s office and states his intention to run against Keith in the special election.

== Production ==
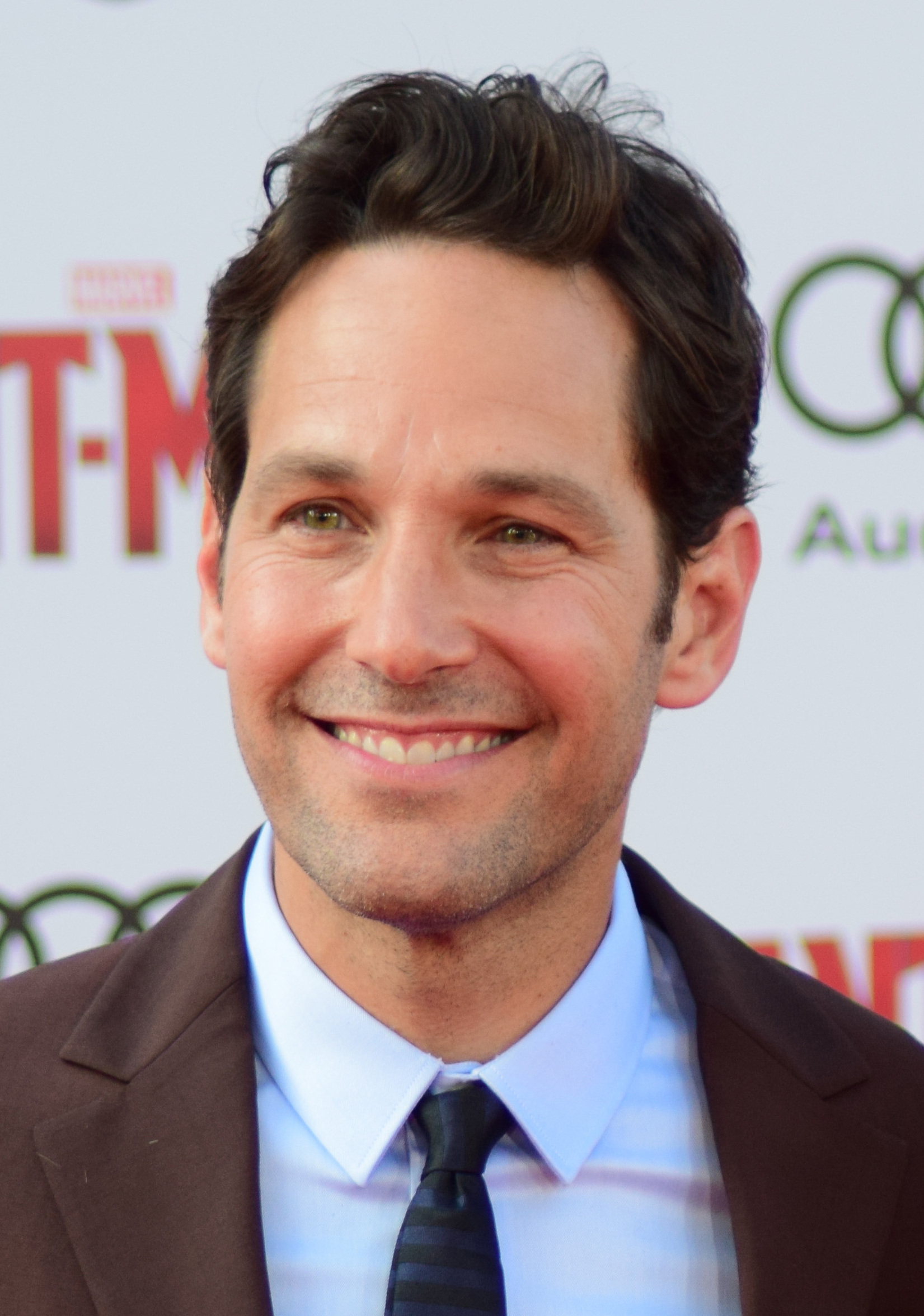
Paul Rudd guest stars in "Debasement Tapes".

"Debasement Tapes" was written by John Enbom and directed by supervising producer Dan Etheridge, marking Enbom's seventeenth and final writing credit for the show and Etheridge's first and only directing credit for the series. The episode guest stars actor Paul Rudd as former rock star Desmond Fellows. During casting of the character of Vinnie Van Lowe, Rudd was considered to play the part; however, the role was given instead to Ken Marino, who appears in the episode. Marino and Rudd are friends in real life. Rudd was a friend of Enbom and Etheridge, and he had been signed on to appear in the episode by the airing of "Spit & Eggs". They had lobbied Rudd to come on the show for several years. Thomas described the reason for Rudd not appearing earlier being that the crew were unable to find a good moment for the character's entry that worked with Rudd's schedule.

Series creator Rob Thomas thought that the character would be a perfect role for Rudd, stating that he would perform it in a British accent and had high expectations for the comedy of the episode because it was being written by Enbom. However, Thomas did not release any details about Rudd's plot line in the episode before its airing. Rudd compared his character to Andrew Ridgeley and Peter O'Toole. In the scene in which Veronica meets Desmond, the film of Kristen Bell was speaking was inadvertently destroyed, leading to those shots being re-filmed nearly six weeks later. Bell had to speak her lines without Rudd present.

The scene in which Desmond goes nude swimming was not included in the same form in Etheridge's version of the episode; however, Thomas enjoyed the take that was eventually used more, so he put it in the final cut. Because the show could not show full nudity, they gave the stunt performer who was filling in for Rudd flesh-colored swim briefs and put him out of focus so they could notify the network that the man out of focus was indeed clothed. The lights that can be seen in the distant background of the scene illuminating the bay were placed nearly ten miles away by grips.

The song Desmond performs solo at the club is "My Before and After" by the Austin, Texas, band Cotton Mather, from their third album, "Kontiki."

== Reception ==
=== Ratings ===
In its original broadcast, "Debasement Tapes" received 1.85 million viewers, ranking 96th of 98 in the weekly rankings. This was a moderate decrease from the previous episode, "Un-American Graffiti", which earned 2.35 million viewers.

=== Reviews ===
The episode received mostly positive reviews from television critics, with Rudd's performance and the various subplots being generally well-received, although some disliked the main mystery. Eric Goldman of IGN graded the episode a 7.8 out of 10, indicating that it was "good". He generally praised Rudd's performance and the case-of-the week, but he was critical of its ending, stating that "after last week, it was a bit too much of another 'and that's one to grow on' conclusion." He was also mixed towards the episode's subplots, enjoying Mac's romantic storyline but disliking Logan's continued interest in Veronica. He also referred to Vinnie running for Sheriff as "a bit ridiculous". Reviewer Alan Sepinwall, on his blog What's Alan Watching?, lauded the episode, particularly Rudd's performance. He stated that Rudd, despite playing a stock character, "made me feel like I hadn't seen it a thousand times before." He also enjoyed the pairing of Mac and Max, while he believed that the impact of Vinnie and Leo's reappearances was blunted by the knowledge that the show would likely not return for a fourth season. Television Without Pity graded the episode a "B".

The Los Angeles Times praised Rudd's performance while criticizing his storyline and the mystery-of-the-week. While stating that Kristen Bell is usually the scene stealer, the reviewer thought that Rudd took on that role in this episode. However, the reviewer called his mystery "an excuse just to get Rudd on the screen." Missy Schwartz of Entertainment Weekly was also positive towards the episode particularly Rudd's performance and the episode's subplots. While criticizing the case-of-the-week's ending as anticlimactic, she thought that Rudd's singing was better than expected. The reviewer also lauded the comedic portions of the subplots, particularly the scene in which Dick compares himself to a lion and Mac and Veronica compare their romantic interests to cafeteria food. Brill Bundy of Zap2it was mostly positive towards the episode, particularly praising Rudd's comedic timing and the episode's use of supporting series regulars such as Mac and Piz. He also commented positively on the development of the romantic storyline between Piz and Veronica, stating that it was realistic. However, the reviewer did not think that the mystery involving Rudd's character was necessary and that it would have been better to not have a mystery at all.

Stereogum referred to the opening scene of the episode as "Rudd generally being awesome." Cortney Martin, writing for the Houston Chronicle, was mixed overall. While being complimentary towards Rudd's performance and Greenfield's reappearance, the reviewer disliked the mystery of Desmond's missing tapes, stating, "the mystery of the week turns out to be the lamest non-mystery of the show's entire run, I think." The reviewer opined that the subplot involving the Fitzpatricks was boring but that Marino's reappearance was a good surprise. Brian Raftery of Idolator believed that Rudd's character could have been based on a number of different real-life figures but guessed Courtney Love and Matthew Sweet as potential influences.

Rowan Kaiser of The A.V. Club praised the episode as the best of the season so far. He lauded the development of the romantic storylines of both Veronica and Mac, while stating that Veronica's was more realistic, describing the concert scene in which Veronica and Piz hold hands again was genuinely emotional. He also stated that Rudd "changes Fellows from a painful stereotype into a pantheon one-off character." The reviewer also opined that the episode's combination of Rudd and the subplot involving Logan and Mac created a very entertaining episode that was exemplary of how well the new story structure could work.
