= Poughkeepsie, Tramps and Thieves =

- Veronica Mars episode
- Episode no.: Season 3 Episode 11
- Directed by: John T. Kretchmer
- Written by: Diane Ruggiero
- Production code: 3T5811
- Original air date: January 30, 2007

Guest appearances
- Adam Rose as Max; Chastity Dotson as Nish Sweeney; Cher Ferreyra as Fern Delgado; Krista Kalmus as Claire Nordhouse; Brianne Davis as Wendy; Christopher Carley as Phone Guy; Richard Keith as Brian; Jackie Debatin as Madame

Episode chronology
← Previous "Show Me the Monkey"	Next → "There's Got to Be a Morning After Pill"
- Veronica Mars season 3

"Poughkeepsie, Tramps and Thieves" is the eleventh episode of the third season of the American mystery television series Veronica Mars, and the fifty-fifth episode overall. Written by executive producer Diane Ruggiero and directed by John T. Kretchmer, the episode premiered on The CW on January 30, 2007. The series depicts the adventures of Veronica Mars (Kristen Bell) as she deals with life as a college student while moonlighting as a private detective.

In this episode, Veronica is hired by Max (Adam Rose) a student who is looking for his beloved, Chelsea, but Veronica learns that Chelsea is actually a prostitute hired to make Max lose his virginity. Meanwhile, Keith finds the official police report of Dean O'Dell's death. In addition, Veronica asks Logan about his past, eventually finding out that he had sex with Madison Sinclair (Amanda Noret) when they were broken up.

Adam Rose makes his third appearance in "Poughkeepsie, Tramps and Thieves". The episode was one of Thomas's favorites of the season, particularly enjoying scenes between Logan and Veronica, Veronica and Keith, and Chelsea and Max. In its initial broadcast, the episode received 2.69 million viewers and mixed reviews from television critics, with critics being divided over the case of the week and the development of Veronica and Logan's romance. Eric Goldman of IGN thought that the episode was "extremely witty and fast-paced", while Rowan Kaiser, writing for The A.V. Club, believed that the episode suffered from a "lack of development for Max's character."

== Background ==
Veronica Mars is a student who progresses from high school to college while moonlighting as a private investigator under the tutelage of her detective father. In each episode, Veronica solves a different stand-alone case while working to solve a more complex mystery. In addition, there is usually a major mystery throughout episodes that takes Veronica longer to solve. In the case of the third season, there are two standalone cases with nine and six episodes, respectively, followed by five episodes without a major story arc. "Poughkeepsie, Tramps and Thieves" is the second episode to solely focus on the mystery of Dean O'Dell's (Ed Begley, Jr.) death, with the previous one being "Show Me the Monkey"; the previous story arc, a serial rape, was solved in "Spit & Eggs".

== Plot synopsis ==
After a lunch with Logan, Veronica notices that the Hearst Lampoon’s offices were egged. Weevil tells her the Dean's office was egged the same night, which Veronica relays to her father. Keith receives the police report of Dean O’Dell’s death, but he doesn’t find anything useful in it. Keith interrogates the Lilith house girls, who admit to egging his office, but seem to have alibis for the Dean’s death. However, Keith later informs Veronica that Nish’s alibi doesn’t check out for the Dean’s car but that it was likely true for Mindy’s car, putting her under suspicion.

While Keith is investigating the Dean's murder, Veronica takes on her own case. Veronica is approached by Max, the student who helped Wallace cheat on his exam first semester. Max hires her to find his beloved, Chelsea, who is engaged to be married in a week. Max says that they spent one magical night together talking. He tells her that she sent him a text message about her impending wedding. Veronica quickly finds out that Max’s friends hired Chelsea, a prostitute, in order to help him be more confident with girls. His roommate sent him a text message in order to help him get over her. Veronica hires the two prostitutes who might be Chelsea, and one of them is Chelsea. Chelsea is incredibly happy to see Max, surprising both Veronica and Logan. As Max and Chelsea (whose real name is Wendy) make out on the couch, Madison (Amanda Noret) appears, looking for Dick.

The next day, Wendy and Max plan their lives together, asking Veronica to help them make Wendy "disappear" from her former life. A battered prostitute appears at Logan’s door and takes Wendy away, citing problems with their pimp, leaving Max heartbroken. Veronica finds a stain of purple makeup on the towel used by the second prostitute, and she immediately deduces that her bruises were fake, and Wendy conned Max out of $1,000. Veronica blackmails Judge Kramer, one of Wendy's clients, in order to get the $1,000 back. Veronica and Logan ask each other personal questions in an attempt to become more intimate, but it fails. At the bus locker at which Veronica instructed the judge to leave the money, she instead finds a note that tells Veronica and Max to get in a limo. In the limo, they find Wendy’s pimp, who is actually a woman. She tells them that she actually did fall in love with Max, but that she needed money for other reasons.

Max immediately pays $10,000 to get Wendy out of her contract, under the condition that he doesn’t tell anyone about the judge. Unexpectedly, Wendy shows up at Max’s door. Max and Wendy’s relationship becomes difficult, and she leaves the following morning, claiming that he has acted differently towards her after he found out her occupation. Max pays back Veronica in $1 bills he received from Wendy, indicating that she had returned to stripping. Madison tells Veronica that she and Logan had sex when he and Veronica were broken up.

== Production ==
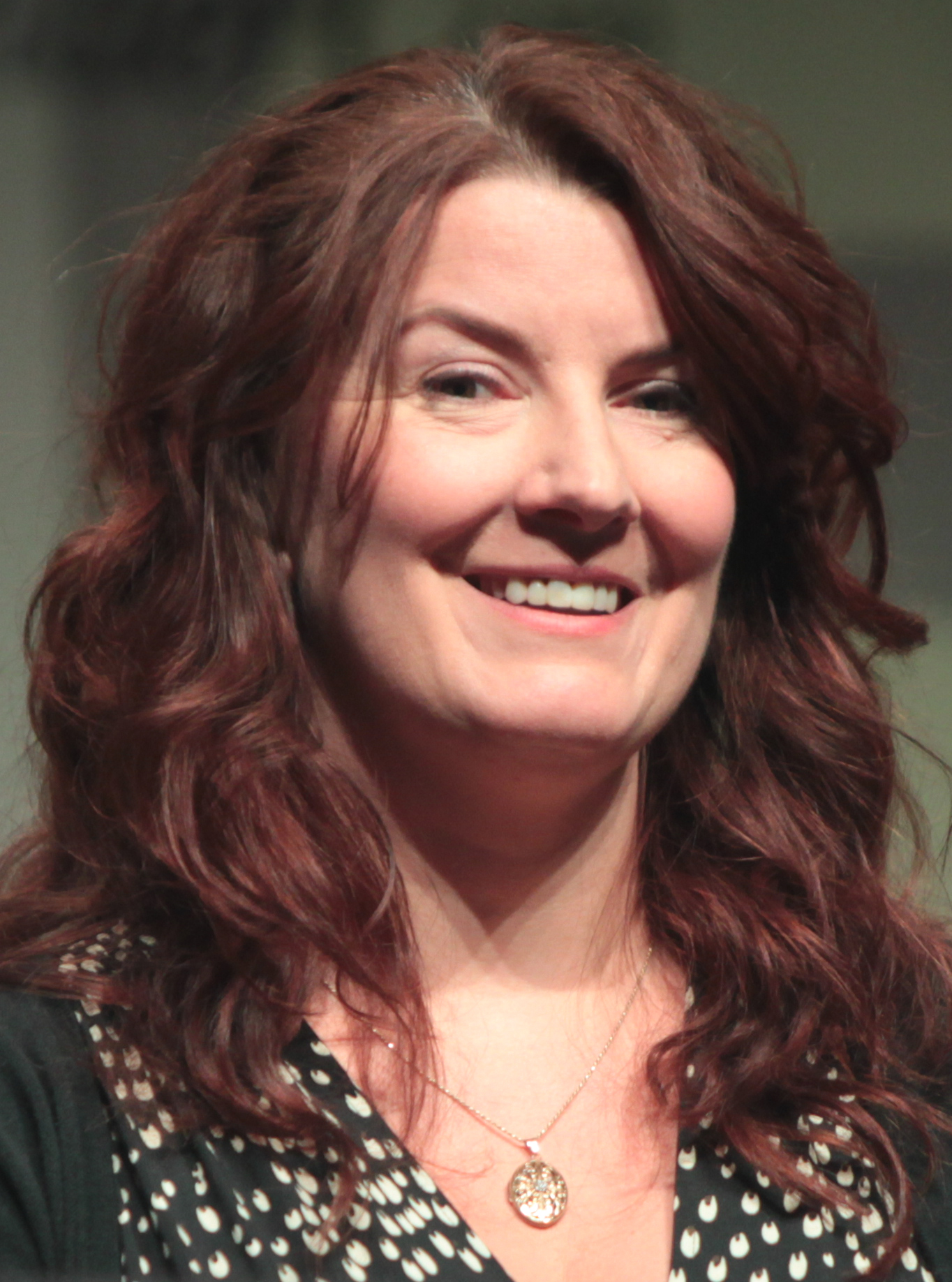
The episode was written by Diane Ruggiero (pictured). During a roundtable session during scripting of the episode, Ruggiero and Thomas won in a debate over the extent of Veronica's jealousy.

The episode was written by executive producer Diane Ruggiero and directed by John T. Kretchmer, marking Ruggiero's sixteenth and penultimate writing credit and Kretchmer's twelfth directing credit. One scene in the episode depicts Veronica and Max sitting in the backseat of a vehicle with Chelsea's pimp (a woman) and several bodyguards. Kretchmer decided to place one of the physically domineering bodyguards between Max and Veronica for comedic effect. In addition, Thomas noted that the actress playing the pimp, Jackie Debatin, appeared in a similar role in an episode of The Office several weeks after the episode aired. The scene in which Keith, in a Sheriff's uniform, spots Don Lamb in his car was difficult to edit because although there was initially no radio music playing, Michael Muhney, playing Lamb, was moving his mouth as if singing lyrics. Thomas reported difficulty in finding a song that would match the movements.

Adam Rose makes his third appearance in "Poughkeepsie, Tramps and Thieves", after being a suspect in "Hi, Infidelity", and selling Wallace his "study guide" in "President Evil". From the very beginning of his appearances, Rose's character, Max, was planned to begin a romantic relationship with Mac. When Rose received the call that he would be appearing in more episodes for a romantic storyline with Mac, Rose, who was roommates with the actor playing Bronson, another Mac love interest, stated, "But I thought that's what my roommate was doing." Thomas called the scene in which Chelsea paints Max's toenails one of his favorite scenes involving no series regulars, noting that it was nearly a three-minute scene.

Thomas enjoyed Brianne Davis's performance as Chelsea so much that he called her and complimented her after filming ended, while Peter Roth expressed interest in giving her a job on another show. The episode was scored by Mark Lanegan, with whom Thomas had gone to elementary school. Thomas was favorable towards the scene in which Veronica and Logan discuss his past, stating that the scene could have dragged due to its length but that it did not. When scripting the scene, there was a discussion in the writers' room regarding what the extent of Veronica's jealousy could be, with Thomas and Ruggiero, who Thomas described as "naturally jealous people", winning out and making Veronica more envious rather than less. For the scene in which Veronica asks Keith about the report on Dean O'Dell's suicide by humorously requiring him to sing what he has found, Colantoni gave nine different musical impressions of his dialogue, "I finally got the police report on the Dean's suicide!"

== Reception ==
=== Ratings ===
In its original broadcast in the United States, "Poughkeepsie, Tramps and Thieves" was viewed by 2.69 million viewers, ranking 92nd of 100 in the weekly rankings.

=== Reviews ===
"Poughkeepsie, Tramps and Thieves" received mixed reviews from television critics. Eric Goldman of IGN rated the episode an 8.2 out of 10, indicating that it was "great". He was positive towards many aspects of the episode, particularly the first half, while he was more mixed or negative towards the conclusion of the main storyline as well as the romantic development. He wrote that "The first half of this episode was extremely witty and fast-paced." However, he thought that the Max-Chelsea storyline should have ended earlier in the episode, and that "love sick, mopey Logan has gotten very old." However, he was complimentary towards Keith's plotline. Rowan Kaiser, writing for The A.V. Club, had mixed feelings towards the episode, being critical of the case of the week while enjoying some of the secondary storylines. While stating that the episode suffered from "the lack of exploration of Max's character" and Wendy being underdeveloped, she elaborated that "those are generally minor quibbles with a decent standalone episode, however." She went on to praise the Logan-Veronica dynamic and Keith's investigation into the Dean's death.

Alan Sepinwall, on his blog What's Alan Watching?, was mostly positive towards the episode, praising the crew's decision to focus on the mysteries of the week, stating that "if the last couple of episodes are an indication, maybe done-in-one is in the right direction." He found that he was invested in the case-of-the-week, while he felt as though the Dean O'Dell plotline was not advancing quickly enough. Keith McDuffee of AOL TV was critical of nearly all aspects of the episode, stating that he was missing the longer story arcs and that once the mystery of Dean O'Dell's murder ended, the show would be relatively aimless. In addition, he decried Mac, Wallace, Piz, and Parker's absences, saying, "I miss the 'gang'." Television Without Pity gave the episode a "B−".
