= Mars, Bars =

- Veronica Mars episode
- Episode no.: Season 3 Episode 14
- Directed by: Harry Winer
- Story by: Phil Klemmer; John Enbom; Joe Voci
- Teleplay by: Phil Klemmer; John Enbom
- Production code: 3T5814

Guest appearances
- Jonathan Chase as Josh Barry; Matt McKenzie as Coach Tom Barry; Tracey Needham as Mrs. Kathleen Barry; Robert Ri'chard as Mason; Patrick Fabian as Professor Hank Landry; Jaime Ray Newman as Mindy O'Dell; Ken Marino as Vinnie Van Lowe; Michael Mitchell as Bronson Pope; Daran Norris as Cliff McCormack; Richard Grieco as Steve Botando

Episode chronology
← Previous "Postgame Mortem"	Next → "Papa's Cabin"
- Veronica Mars season 3

"Mars, Bars" is the fourteenth episode of the third season of the American mystery television series Veronica Mars, and the fifty-eighth episode overall. Directed by Harry Winer, with a story by Phil Klemmer, John Enbom, and Joe Voci and a teleplay by Klemmer and Enbom, the episode premiered on The CW on February 20, 2007. The series depicts the adventures of Veronica Mars (Kristen Bell) as she deals with life as a college student while moonlighting as a private detective.

The episode is the second of two to deal directly with the death of Hearst's basketball coach, Tom Barry (Matt McKenzie). In this installment, Veronica and Keith (Enrico Colantoni) search for Tom's missing son Josh (Jonathan Chase) while investigating a variety of alternate suspects. In addition, they continue to question Mindy O'Dell (Jaime Ray Newman) and Hank Landry (Patrick Fabian) with regard to the death of Dean Cyrus O'Dell. Meanwhile, Logan (Jason Dohring), Parker (Julie Gonzalo), Mac (Tina Majorino), and Bronson (Michael Mitchell) attend a scavenger hunt for Valentine's Day.

"Mars, Bars" marks the final appearance of series regular Michael Muhney, who played Sheriff Lamb, after the death of his character. Muhney was not informed of his character's death until the filming of the episode; he was surprised and saddened at the decision. Spoilers about the scene were not leaked prior to the episode, something about which Muhney was happy. In addition, Mac was initially scheduled to be taken advantage of by a professor in this episode, but a romantic relationship with Bronson was chosen instead. The episode garnered 2.27 million viewers and positive reviews from television critics, with many praising Muhney's performance and viewing it as a return to form for the show, while some were more critical of Logan's subplot.

== Plot synopsis ==
At the end of the previous episode, Postgame Mortem, Veronica is arrested by Sheriff Lamb (Michael Muhney) on the suspicion that she helped the now-missing Josh Barry to escape from prison. This episode opens with Lamb questioning her and learning little, as she had nothing to do with his disappearance.

Keith visits Veronica in jail. Cliff McCormack (Daran Norris) also arrives, and tells Veronica that she has been all but cleared, but that Sheriff Lamb will keep her in custody for as long as he can because he still believes she was involved in Josh's disappearance. Keith returns to Mars Investigations, where Hank Landry arrives and says that he found a bugging device in his phone. Keith denies that he or Veronica placed the device in his phone, but Hank becomes angry, telling him to stop investigating him.

Keith brings his findings on the death of Cyrus to Sheriff Lamb and provides an alternate explanation: that the Dean had discovered his wife was having an affair. Lamb agrees with him that it was a murder. Lamb calls Mindy O'Dell to his office. Logan visits Veronica in her cell and they are civil to each other. After being released from jail, Veronica is stopped on the street by Josh, who has Mason (Robert Ri'chard) in the trunk of his car, frantically telling Veronica that Mason is the culprit. When Veronica disproves this claim, she tells Josh to call her using a disposable phone within 24 hours. Veronica releases Mason from the trunk.

Logan takes a wireless card to Mac as a favor, and she, Parker, and Bronson invite him on a night out. Logan, Mac, Bronson, and Parker take part in a Valentine's Day scavenger hunt. The quartet find their last clue at a beach. Mac and Bronson kiss, while Parker and Logan bond while swimming. The scavenger hunt ends, and they come in third place. Logan and Parker leave, and Mac and Bronson have sex for the first time.

While reviewing the O'Dell case, Veronica notices that the TV station the dean was watching the night he was murdered had moved its programming back an hour, meaning their estimated time of death was wrong. The forensic results about the prints in O'Dell’s room come back, and they are the fingerprints of Steve Botando (Richard Grieco). Botando is interrogated by Sheriff Lamb.

Keith investigates the Coach Barry case more, finding that the Coach had Creutzfeldt–Jakob disease. His wife took out a life insurance policy several days before his death with a double indemnity clause. Keith talks to Coach Barry's wife, who pulls out a gun on him. It is a Colt .45, the gun that was used to kill Coach Barry. However, she claims that she was not intending to shoot Keith and that it is a relic of the Coach's army days. Sheriff Lamb receives a call about a robbery at the O'Dell house. It is Steve Botando, who bludgeons Lamb until he is mortally wounded.

Veronica gives Josh a new ID, and he successfully unlocks his safe-deposit box at a bank. Inside is a DVD of Coach Barry telling Josh about his condition and that he was planning to have a friend kill him to avoid futile medical expenses and give his family the insurance money. Josh flees the country until he is old enough to receive the money his father left aside. Veronica shows Keith the DVD. Keith calls the Sheriff's office and finds that Sheriff Lamb has just died from his wounds. Veronica sees Logan and Parker talking.

Keith, now acting Sheriff, questions Mindy with new evidence, claiming that Mindy is protecting Hank or Hank is protecting Mindy. The story continues in the next episode, Papa's Cabin.

== Production ==
=== Writing and filming ===
"Mars, Bars" features a story by Phil Klemmer, John Enbom, and Joe Voci and a teleplay by Klemmer and Enbom, marking Klemmer's fourteenth installment of the series, Enbom's fifteenth episode for the show, and Voci's second and final writing credit (after "Postgame Mortem"). It was directed by Harry Winer, marking his fifth and final directing credit for Veronica Mars, after "Meet John Smith", "Blast from the Past", "Wichita Linebacker", and "Of Vice and Men". The scene on the beach was the work of Winer, whom Thomas referred to as a "visual stylist". He enjoyed the scene for showing Neptune as a California beach town while distinguishing itself due to the cold weather, a visual characteristic that he felt was not portrayed often enough.

"Mars, Bars" features the reappearance of the character of Bronson, who had previously appeared in "Show Me the Monkey". Mac loses her virginity to Bronson in the episode. The writers had initially planned a storyline in which Mac would be taken advantage of by a professor due to her fragile emotional state following her romance with Beaver (Kyle Gallner), however that storyline was removed, partially due to the fact that Thomas and the crew wanted Mac to have something positive happen to her. Prior to the filming of this episode, Thomas counseled Jason Dohring and Julie Gonzalo, who play Logan and Parker, respectively, on the two characters' interpersonal chemistry in the episode. Specifically, he did not want them to make their flirting obvious, but rather give "a whiff of connection".

=== Acting ===
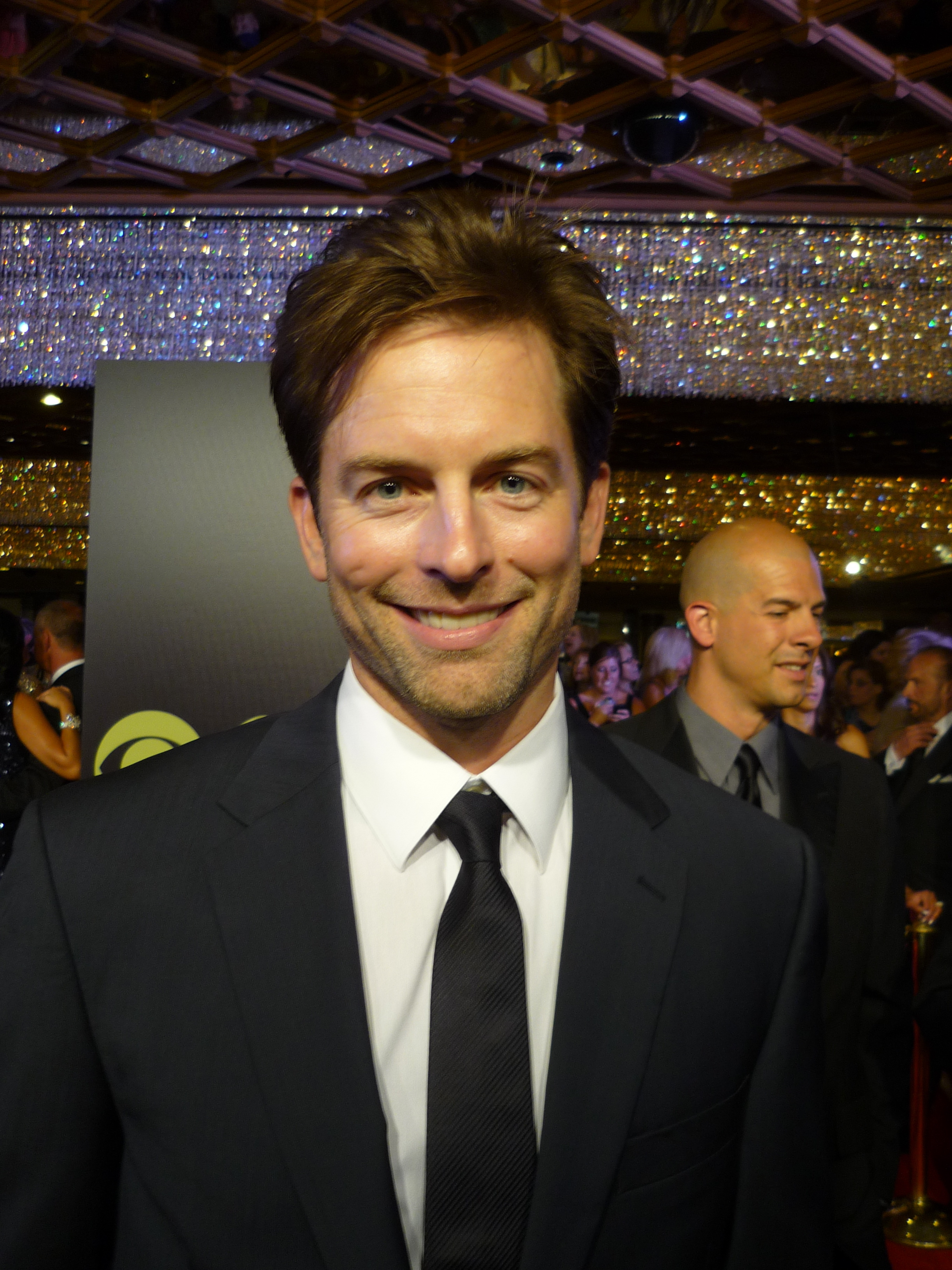
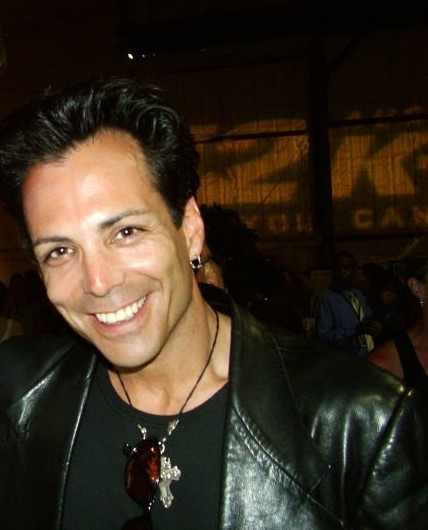
Series regular Michael Muhney (left) makes his final appearance on the series as Don Lamb after his character's death at the hands of Steve Botando, played by Richard Grieco (right). Muhney enjoyed working with Grieco, terming him "approachable".

This episode marks the final appearance of series regular Michael Muhney, who plays Don Lamb on the show, after his character is bludgeoned to death by Steve Botando, played by Richard Grieco. Muhney did not know about his character's death until receiving the script for the episode. This was roughly six weeks before the episode's airing and during filming. Muhney did not know the rationale for killing the character, but when he found out, he stated that "I felt like a piece of me was dying as well." He also stated that he was also heartbroken because he had grown attached to the character over the course of three years playing him. Muhney also expressed surprise over the writing decision.

Because the crew shoots scenes out of order, the last scene that Muhney filmed was the one in which Keith offers to help Lamb in investigating the break-in at the O'Dell residence. He enjoyed acting with Grieco, calling him "very approachable." He was also pleased with the character's sendoff, stating that it was appropriate. He wished that he had more time to say farewells to each cast and crew member individually. Lamb's last words were "I smell bread"; Muhney explained that it was a reference to a minor character death on M*A*S*H. He stated that it was an in-joke among the crew and that the words had "no significance within the borders of Neptune." However, Muhney thought of it as his character's last burst of sarcasm.

The reveal of Sheriff Lamb's death was not leaked anywhere online prior to the airing of "Mars, Bars", something about which Muhney was happy. He stated that "the surprise was the best part" and that he disliked it when spoilers from other series were released early. After the episode's initial airing, Muhney reported that his inbox was flooded with emails from press members seeking interviews, stating that new messages came after the airing in each United States time zone. Some fans were upset about his death, and debate occurred online. However, Muhney also received messages of support for the character, commenting "it's nice to know that he will be missed." With the announcement of the Veronica Mars film in 2013, Zap2it speculated that Muhney might return; however, this was later revealed not to be the case when the official casting was announced. Thomas praised Daran Norris's performance in the episode, particularly his voice in the scene in which he defends Steve Botando in front of Sheriff Lamb. Thomas noted that Norris was also a voice actor and that he was particularly well-liked on the set for his humorous performances.

== Reception ==
=== Ratings ===
In its original broadcast, "Mars, Bars" received 2.27 million viewers, ranking 96th of 99 in the weekly rankings. This was a decrease of 100,000 viewers from the figures of the previous episode, "Postgame Mortem", which garnered 2.37 million viewers.

=== Reviews ===
The episode received generally positive reviews from television critics. Eric Goldman, writing for IGN, gave the episode an 8.8 out of 10, indicating that it was "great". He referred to "Mars, Bars" as one of the finest episodes of season three, praising the Valentine's Day subplot, the development of the mystery of Dean O'Dell's death, and Muhney's performance. Regarding Logan, he opined that although he did not like him moping after his breakup with Veronica, this episode fixed that by including him in the Valentine's Day subplot and setting up a romantic relationship with Parker: "it's just a huge relief to see Logan in a different light and interacting with different people, finally." He also praised Lamb's death scene as being devoid of clichés by not giving him an act of heroism for his dying moments. Reviewer Alan Sepinwall, on his blog What's Alan Watching?, lauded the episode. He saw the episode and the previous episode as a return to form for Veronica Mars, writing, "it's episodes like these last two that remind me of what this show looks like when it's really cooking." He also enjoyed the lack of a redemptive moment for Lamb at the end of his life as well as the comedic value of some scenes in the episode.

BuddyTV wrote that "Mars, Bars" was an example of the best the series could get. The reviewer praised all of the interconnecting subplots, Jason Dohring's performance, and the episode's pacing, writing, "Anybody who was kvetching over the slow pace of the last few weeks of Veronica Mars got a huge payoff tonight." Rowan Kaiser, writing for The A.V. Club, gave a mixed review. While she was positive towards Lamb's death, she criticized the subplot involving Mac, Logan, Parker, and Bronson. Regarding Lamb, she opined that it made her realize how much she had enjoyed the role; however, she thought that "knowing that the show is almost finished limits its impact." She was positive towards Keith's role in the episode but referred to the Valentine's Day plot as out of character for the show for its happy feel. "It's cute. And cuteness in an episode with the shocking death of a recurring character seems out of place." Television Without Pity graded the episode a "B".

BuddyTV also ranked Sheriff Lamb's death 7th on its list of the seven saddest TV deaths of 2007. On a ranking of all 64 Veronica Mars episodes, Anais Bordages of BuzzFeed ranked the episode 13th. After the series was announced as being cancelled by The CW, fans collectively sent nearly 10,000 Mars bars to Dawn Ostroff, the president of the network as a reference to the show, but the attempt was futile.
