= Michael Muhney =

American actor

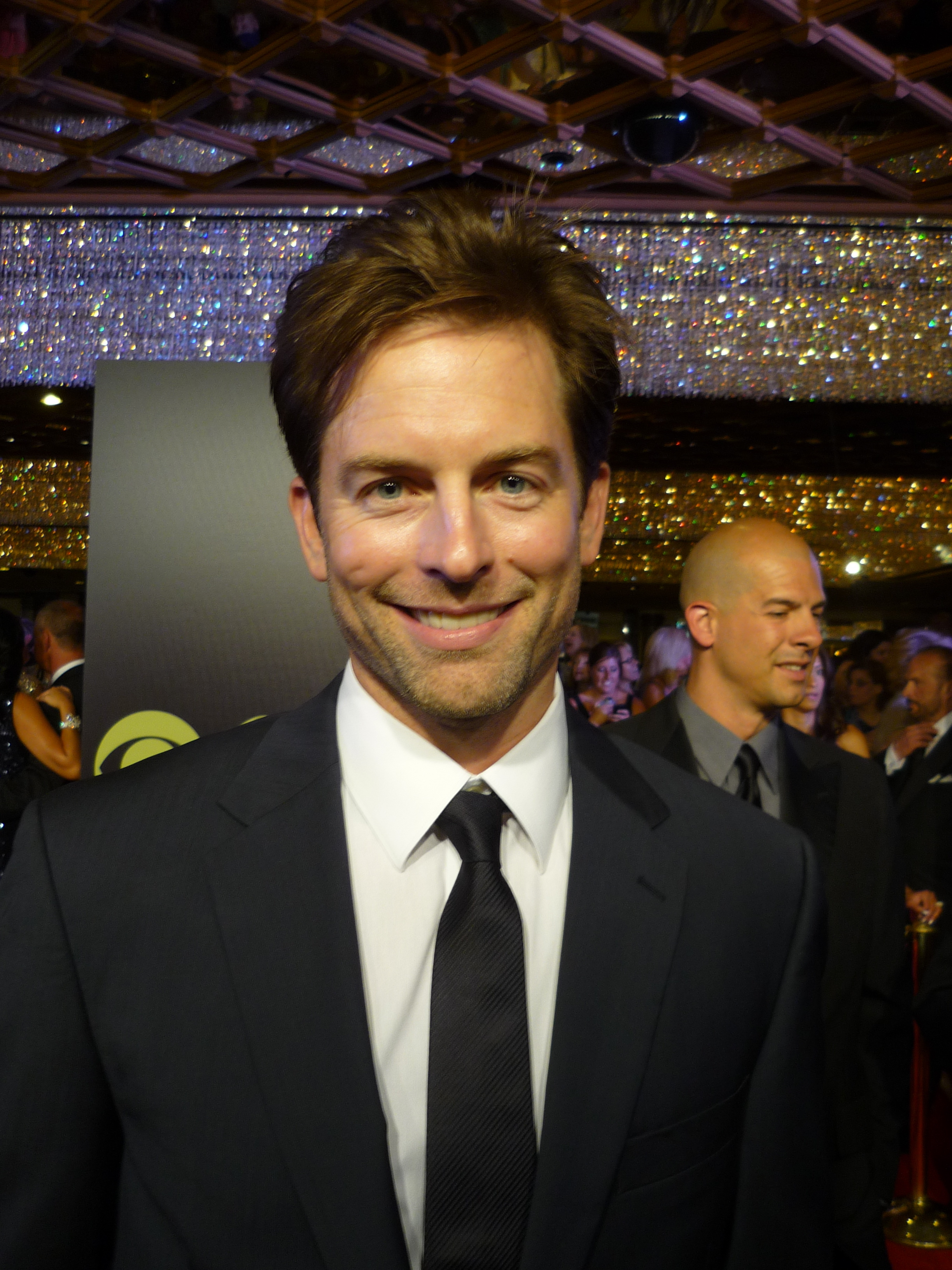
- Muhney in 2010
- Born: June 12, 1975 (age 51)
- Education: DePaul University (BFA)
- Occupation: Actor
- Years active: 1998–present
- Spouse: Jaime Muhney (m. 2000)
- Children: 3

Michael Muhney (born June 12, 1975) is an American actor. His best known roles include Sheriff Don Lamb on the UPN/The CW television series Veronica Mars between 2004 and 2007 and Adam Newman on the CBS daytime soap opera The Young and the Restless from 2009 to 2014.

== Early life and education ==
Muhney grew up in Euless, Texas, from the age of eight. When he was 16 years old, he won the state championship for his One-Act play performance while attending Trinity High School. He moved back to Chicago where he earned a bachelor's degree from The Theatre School at DePaul University in 1997. He is a member of Mensa. He also speaks two other languages, German and American Sign Language (ASL).

== Career ==
=== Veronica Mars ===
From 2004 to 2007, Muhney portrayed Don Lamb, an antagonist to the title character, on the television show Veronica Mars. Muhney was a recurring cast member in the first two seasons before being upgraded to series regular in the third season. Muhney's last appearance on the show was the episode Mars, Bars.

=== The Young and the Restless ===
In May 2009, after Chris Engen left the role of Adam Newman, Muhney was hired as a recast. He made his debut on the episode dated June 25, 2009. In 2011, Muhney signed a contract that would keep him in the role for an unspecified period. In April 2013, Muhney announced that he had signed a new contract that would expire in June 2015. In December, however, Muhney announced that he had been abruptly let go from the soap opera, with his last airdate on January 30, 2014.

Immediately after the news of his firing, Muhney conducted an interview with the Huffington Post and stated: "Part of me feels this is because I've always been outspoken, and sometimes I've been too outspoken. Sometimes I've walked around with a big backpack full of hubris. That is entirely on me. CBS, Sony, and Jill Phelps are not to blame for that." Muhney also said that the writers were planning to "take a break from Adam for 3 to 6 months" and then recast the role. However, the next month it was reported that Muhney was fired after his costar Hunter King had accused him of groping her. Radar Online reported that King complained that Muhney fondled her breasts on two occasions, both of which were unsolicited and unwanted advances. According to Radar Online, King told producers she would go to the police and file a report against Muhney if he was not fired from the show. Muhney later claimed that the allegations were false and merely a salacious rumor. No charges were ever filed.

== Filmography ==
| Year | Title | Role | Notes |
|---|---|---|---|
| 1998 | Real Life | Jason | Episode: "Unaired Pilot" |
| 1998 | A Will of Their Own | William Steward | Episode: "1.1" |
| 1999 | Turks | Paul Turk | 13 episodes |
| 2000 | Love 101 | Andrew | |
| 2000 | Virtual Nightmare | Dale Hunter | TV movie |
| 2000–01 | The Huntress | Det. Mark Farrell | 8 episodes |
| 2001 | Nicolas | | |
| 2002 | ER | Colin Prentice | Episode: "Chaos Theory" |
| 2002 | Boomtown | Chris Griggs | Episode: "Possession" |
| 2003 | JAG | Major Jack McBurney | Episode: "Meltdown" |
| 2003 | Charmed | Seth | Episode: "Love's a Witch" |
| 2003 | Without a Trace | Billy Melina | Episode: "Trip Box" |
| 2004 | CSI:Miami | Rob Mason | Episode: "Crime Wave" |
| 2004–07 | Veronica Mars | Sheriff Don Lamb | 40 episodes |
| 2006 | Lovers, Liars & Lunatics | Louis | |
| 2006 | Numb3rs | Lt. Joseph Karnes | Episode: "All's Fair" |
| 2007 | One Night | Jack | |
| 2008 | CSI: Miami | Rob Mason / Tim Gilbert | Episode: "Raising Caine" |
| 2008 | Family Practice | Kent Kinglare | TV movie |
| 2008 | Columbus Day | Det. Daniels | |
| 2008 | No Man's Land: The Rise of Reeker | Dep. Harris McAllister | |
| 2009 | Act Your Age | Lake Emerson | |
| 2009–14 | The Young and the Restless | Adam Newman | Role held: June 25, 2009 – January 30, 2014 |
| 2010 | The Portal | Daniel Savanah | |
| 2010 | Disconnect | Dylan | |
| 2014 | Correcting Christmas | Cameron | TV movie (original title was "Back to Christmas") |
| 2017 | The Good Doctor | Mr. Gallico | Episode: “Point Three Percent” |

== Awards and nominations ==
List of awards and nominations
| Year | Award | Category | Work | Result | Ref. |
|---|---|---|---|---|---|
| 2013 | Daytime Emmy Award | Outstanding Lead Actor in a Drama Series | The Young and the Restless | Nominated | |
| 2017 | Soap Awards France | Actor of the Year | The Young and the Restless | Nominated | |
| 2017 | Soap Awards France | Couple of the Year — "Chelsea and Adam" (shared with Melissa Claire Egan) | The Young and the Restless | Nominated | |
