= Gavin Fields =

American writer, director, and producer

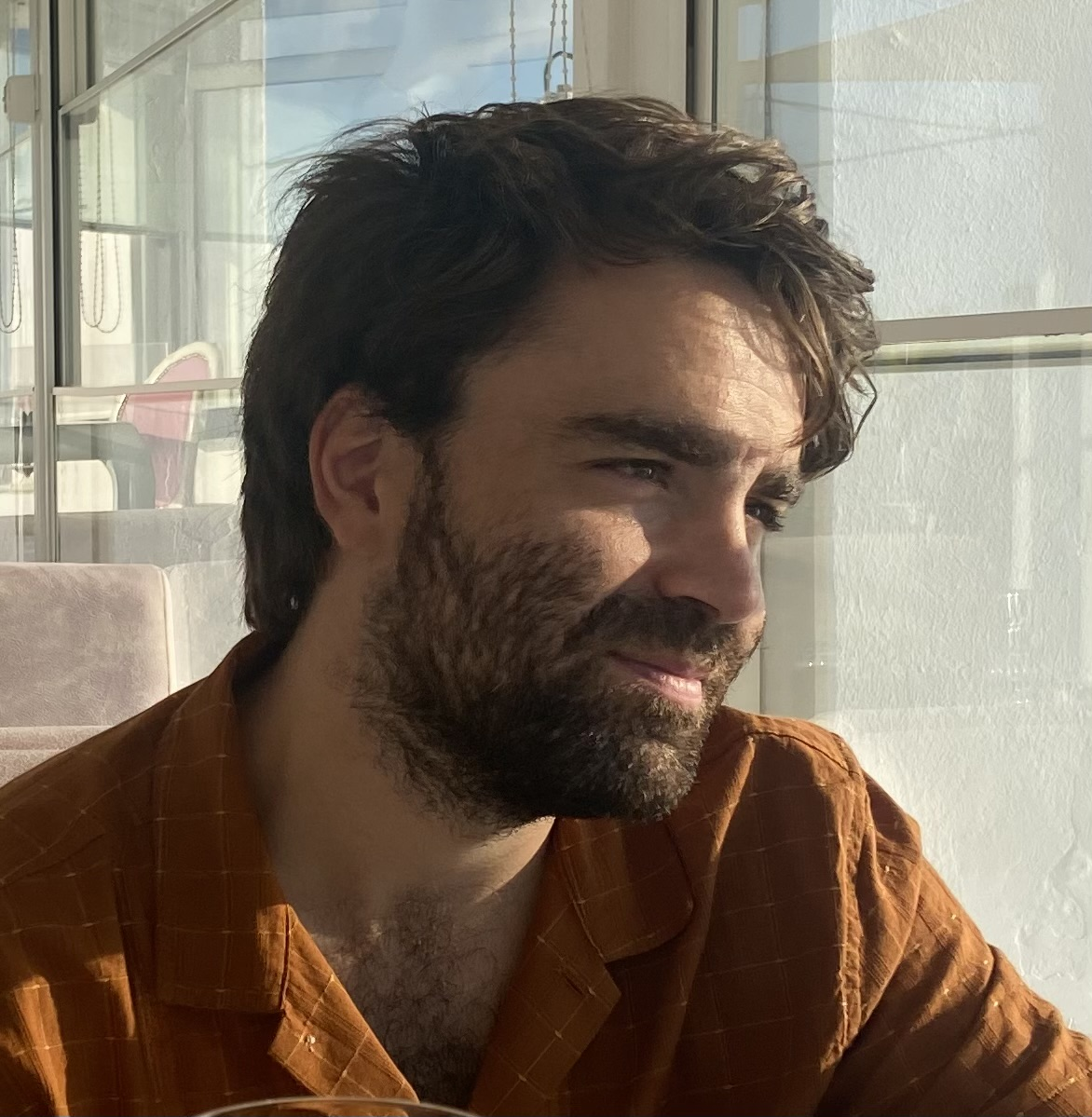
- Fields in 2022
- Born: Gavin Lee Fields c. 1991; Jackson, Mississippi
- Education: The University of Mississippi, Arizona State University
- Occupations: Writer, Director, Producer
- Years active: 2012 - Present

Gavin Fields (born c. 1991) is an American writer, director, and producer best known for his debut feature film Brutal Season (2022).

== Early life ==
Fields grew up in Jackson, Mississippi where he attended St. Andrews Episcopal School. As a teenager, he was the drummer and singer in lounge pop band The Da Vincis. He received his undergraduate degree from The University of Mississippi, where he studied theatre and film. He received an MA in Film Studies from Arizona State University.

== Career ==
While a student at The University of Mississippi, Fields co wrote and acted in short film The Surface, and produced The Original IQ Tester, both of which played national and international film festivals. He continued writing, directing, and producing shorts upon graduating, as well as conceptualizing, directing, and editing commercial work.

Fields began writing feature film screenplays while working on his masters degree. His first, Harry, Above the Title, was a finalist in 2019’s Nashville Film Festival Screenplay Competition, as well as a semi finalist in the ScreenCraft Drama Screenplay competition.

In the same year, his second script, a comedy entitled A Season to Laugh, was a second round selection in the Austin Film Festival Script Competition and a quarter finalist in the Script Pipeline Screenwriting Competition.

Psychological thriller A Devil Will Fall was a quarter finalist in 2020’s BlueCat Screenplay Competition and Fresh Voices Screenplay Competition. It was a semi finalist in the CineQuest Screenwriting Competition and the ScreenCraft Screenwriting Fellowship in the same year.

In early 2020, he finished the script for neo noir Brutal Season and began developing it with producer Shelby Grady. The film premiered at Fantastic Fest in 2022 to positive reviews before going on to play the Fargo Film Festival, the Chattanooga Film Festival, NewFilmmakers LA, and the Phoenix Film Festival, where it was awarded Best Ensemble Cast. It was picked up for distribution by 1091 Pictures and released October 10, 2023.

Fields continues to write and has since completed three additional feature screenplays. His next film, …And Before We’re Condemned, is in development.

== Filmography ==
Year	English title	Director	Writer	Producer	Actor	Role	Notes
2014	The Surface	No	Yes	No	Yes	Sage	Short
2015	The Original IQ Tester	No	No	Yes	No	N/A	Short
2018	The Sea Breaks	No	Yes	Yes	Yes	Jim	Short
2019	Slice of Life	Yes	Yes	Yes	Yes	Al	Short
2023	Brutal Season	Yes	Yes	Yes	No	N/A	Feature
2024	...And Before We're Condemned	Yes	Yes	Yes	No	NA	Feature/Pre Production

== Awards and recognition ==
Year	Award	Category	Nominated work	Result	Ref.
2015	Queens World Film Festival	Founder's Choice	The Original IQ Tester	Won	
2017	Queens World Film Festival	Best Narrative Short	The Surface	Nominated	
2023	Phoenix Film Festival	Best Ensemble Cast	Brutal Season	Won	
