= Adam Rose =

Adam Rose may refer to:

- Adam Rose (actor) (born 1987), Israeli-American actor and content creator
- Adam Rose (wrestler) (born 1979), South African retired professional wrestler
