= Marc Donato =

Canadian actor

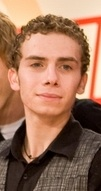
- Donato in September 2008
- Born: Marc Giuseppe Donato; January 25, 1989 (age 37); Toronto, Ontario, Canada
- Occupations: Actor; voice actor
- Years active: 1993–present

Marc Giuseppe Donato (born January 25, 1989) is a Canadian actor. He is best known for his role as Derek Haig on Degrassi: The Next Generation.

== Career ==
One of the earliest films in which Donato appears is as eight-year-old Mike Hillary in the low budget television film, Specimen. He was also up for the role of Cole in The Sixth Sense.

Later roles include Derek Haig on Degrassi: The Next Generation and those in Doc, Locked in Silence, The Blue Butterfly, Avatar: The Last Airbender and other cartoon voices, recently as Ethan in The Future Is Wild. He also had small roles as Mason in The Sweet Hereafter, Adam in Pay It Forward, Davey in White Oleander, and as a child in Adam Sandler's character's 1st grade class in Billy Madison, and starred in the thriller film The Final. His latest accomplishment was landing the role of Tarek in the live action feature film Bad Kids Go to Hell (2012), based on the best selling graphic novel of the same name. In 2013, he starred in Sick Boy starring with his real-life ex-girlfriend Skye McCole Bartusiak. He also had a role in the music video for Simple Plan's hit song "I'd Do Anything" playing a boy who enters Simple Plan's concert with two dates.

== Filmography ==
=== Film ===
Year	Title	Role	Notes
1994	Pom Poko	Sasuke	Voice - English
1994	The Killing Machine	Connor's child	
1995	Billy Madison	Nodding 1st Grader	
1997	The Sweet Hereafter	Mason Ansel	
1998	Bone Daddy	Mark	
1998	A Boy's Own Story	Zackary	Short film
1999	A Map of the World	Robbie Mackessy	
2000	Camera	Child	Short film
2000	Pay it Forward	Adam	
2002	White Oleander	Davey Thomas	
2004	The Blue Butterfly	Pete Carlton	
2010	The Final	Dane	
2012	Bad Kids Go to Hell	Tarek Ahmed	
2012	Code Red	Marc	Short film
2012	Sick Boy	Chris	
2013	M15F1T5	DJ Marco Polo	Voice; Original title - The Tribe of Misfits
2014	Bad Buddha	Jase	Short film
2015	Charlie Muse		Short film
2018	Mind of Its Own	Trevor	
2024	The Hall Pass	Terrence	Short film

=== Television ===
Year	Title	Role	Notes
1993	JFK: Reckless Youth	3-year-old Jack	Mini-series
1994	Ultimate Betrayal	Young John	TV movie
1994	Fatal Vows: The Alexandra O'Hara Story	Ryan	TV movie
1994-1995	Due South	Little Kid / Small Boy / Little Boy	3 episodes
1995	Side Effects	Martin Bindernagle	Season 1, episode 13: "Lucky Numbers"
1995-1997	Flash Forward	5-year-old Tucker James	8 episodes
1996	Double Jeopardy	Aaron	TV movie Credited as Mark Donato
1996	The Specimen	8-year-old Mike Hilary	TV movie
1996	The Morrison Murders: Based on a True Story	Beau	TV movie
1997-2000	The Animal Shelf	Timothy	Voice; Main role
1998	The Sweetest Thing	Chip Martin	TV movie
1998	Rescuers: Stories of Courage: Two Couples	Paul	Segment: "Marie Taquet"
1998	Noddy	Dewey Lester	Voice; Season 1, episode 25: "Mixed Up Masks"
1999	Locked in Silence	Stephen	TV movie
1999	Dear America: Standing in the Light	Thomas Logan	
1999	Tales from the Cryptkeeper	David	Voice; Season 3, episode 6: "Trouble in Store"
1999	Thrill Seekers	Kevin	TV movie
1999-2001	Redwall	Young Martin / Young Mathias	Voice; 24 episodes
2000	Redwall: The Movie	Young Mathias	Voice
2000	Franklin	Crab	Voice; Season 4, episode 12: "Franklin at the Seashore / Franklin and Snail's Dream"
2000	Sailor Moon	Royal Subject / Danny / Mansanori Tsuzki	Voice - English; 4 episodes
2001	Twice in a Lifetime	12-year-old Mikey	
2001	Dangerous Child	Leo Cambridge	TV movie
2001	Rescue Heroes	Tyler	Voice; Season 2, episode 5: "High Anxiety / Canyon Catastrophe"
2001	Sagwa, the Chinese Siamese Cat	Ling-Ling	Voice; Episode 18: "Panda-monium / Festival of Lanterns"
2001	Mutant X	Joshua Valentine	Season 1, episode 9: "Crime of the New Century"
2002	Real Kids, Real Adventures	Joseph Orien	Season 3, episode 1: "Burning at Crooked Lake"
2003	Miss Spider's Sunny Patch Kids	Wiggle	Voice
2004	Doc	Andrew Spinner	Season 4, episode 10: "Who Wants to be a Millionaire"
2004	Clubhouse	Rich	Season 1, episode 1: "Pilot"
2005-2009	Degrassi: The Next Generation	Derek Haig	35 episodes
2006-2007	Avatar: The Last Airbender	Longshot / Additional voices	Voice; 2 episodes
2006-2008	Degrassi: Minis	Derek Haig	10 episodes
2007-2008	The Future is Wild	Ethan	Voice; 18 episodes
2012	Ghostquake	Colt	TV movie Also known as Haunted High
2015	Ladies Like Us	Marc	Season 2, episode 1: "Angels in the Outfield"

=== Music videos ===
Year	Title	Artist	Role	Notes
2002	I'd Do Anything	Simple Plan featuring Mark Hoppus	Concerting Going Boy with Two Dates	
2018	"I'm Upset"	Drake	Himself	As part of an ensemble cast of actors/actresses from Degrassi: The Next Generation
