= Ringleader =

A ringleader is a leader of a group of people, especially one involved in illicit activities.

Ringleader may also refer to:

- Ringmaster (circus), The leader of a circus performance.
- Ringleader (comics), a fictional character in the Marvel Universe
- Ringleader of the Tormentors, an album by the singer Morrissey
- The Ringleader: Mixtape Volume III, an album by the disc jockey DJ Maj
- A gang leader

== See also ==
- Ringmaster (disambiguation)
