= An Unknown Compelling Force =

2021 American documentary film

- Promotional release poster
- Directed by: Liam Le Guillou
- Written by: Liam Le Guillou
- Distributed by: 1091 Pictures
- Release date: June 15, 2021
- Running time: 106 minutes
- Country: United States
- Language: English

An Unknown Compelling Force is a 2021 American documentary film about the Dyatlov Pass incident, an event in which a group of nine Soviet alpine ski hikers, led by Igor Dyatlov, died in the northern Ural Mountains between February 1 and 2, 1959, under uncertain circumstances. The film is written and directed by Liam Le Guillou.

An Unknown Compelling Force was released on digital platforms by 1091 Pictures on June 15, 2021.

== Synopsis ==
An Unknown Compelling Force features filmmaker Liam Le Guillou investigating information and theories surrounding the Dyatlov Pass incident, an event in which nine Soviet hikers from Ural State Technical University mysteriously died in the northern Ural Mountains between February 1 and 2, 1959. Le Guillou travels to the Ural Mountains and interviews Russian journalists and friends of the hikers; interviews with Yuri Yudin, a tenth hiker who left the expedition on January 28, 1959, for medical reasons, are also featured.

== Release and reception ==
An Unknown Compelling Force was released on digital platforms, including Amazon Prime Video and Apple TV, by 1091 Pictures on June 15, 2021.

On the review aggregator website Rotten Tomatoes, the film has an approval rating of 67% based on six reviews, with an average rating of 5.8/10.

Mark Feeney, reviewing the film for The Boston Globe, called it "very interesting, if often overdone," writing that, "[Le Guillou]'s fascination with the mystery is contagious. Perhaps unfairly, a viewer keeps wondering what Werner Herzog – at once more measured and obsessive – might have made of this material." Luiz H. C. of Bloody Disgusting wrote of the film: "Not only does An Unknown Compelling Force debunk some of the more absurd theories regarding what happened back in 1959, but the film also provides some compelling evidence for alternate explanations that are just as creepy. The mysterious nature of the case means that there's no definitive conclusion, but this is still an incredibly entertaining and well-researched film."
