= Dumbbells (film) =

- Film poster
- Directed by: Christopher Livingston
- Written by: Brian Drolet; Hoyt Richards
- Produced by: Brian Drolet; Hoyt Richards; Reagan Rosson; Barry Katz; Josh Goldstein
- Starring: Brian Drolet; Hoyt Richards; Taylor Cole; Mircea Monroe
- Cinematography: Jessica Young
- Edited by: Sean Galera; Sandy S. Solowitz
- Music by: Michael Muhlfriedel
- Production companies: Full Blitz Entertainment; Check Your Head Films; Tortoise Entertainment
- Distributed by: GoDigital
- Release date: January 10, 2014
- Running time: 100 minutes
- Country: United States
- Language: English

Dumbbells is a 2014 comedy film directed by Christopher Livingston and starring Brian Drolet, Hoyt Richards, Mircea Monroe, Jaleel White, Taylor Cole, Jay Mohr, Tom Arnold, Laura Ashley Samuels and Andy Milonakis, with a rare film appearance by Nancy Olson (her first film in 17 years). The film saw a limited release on January 10, 2014. The film also marks the film debut of singer Frenchie Davis. The film received generally negative reviews from critics.

== Synopsis ==
Chris Long is an ex-NCAA basketball player turned trainer who finds a new purpose when his gym's new owner, Jack, unleashes a lucrative plan to turn the neglected business into a reality show. When Chris' co-workers resist this new direction, he and Jack form an unlikely alliance that allows them to face the demons of their pasts and ultimately, save the gym's future.

== Cast ==
- Brian Drolet as Chris Long
- Hoyt Richards as Jack Guy
- Jaleel White as The Leader
- Mircea Monroe as Kim Hertz
- Taylor Cole as Rachel Corelli
- Frenchie Davis as Venus
- Carl Reiner as Donald Cummings
- Nancy Olson as Bianca Cummings
- Jay Mohr as Harold
- Olivia Taylor Dudley as Heather
- Michael Ray Bower as Erwin
- Laura Ashley Samuels as Candy
- Valery M. Ortiz as Missy
- Andy Milonakis as Rusty
- Tom Arnold as Daddy
- Fabio Lanzoni as himself
- Jason Scott Jenkins as Dre Lincoln
- Eva Marie as Naomi

== Reception ==
Rotten Tomatoes gave the film a score of 14% based on 7 reviews, with an average score of 2.52/10. On Metacritic, the film has a score of 24 out of 100 based on 6 critics, indicating "generally unfavorable" reviews.

Dumbbells attracted media attention in France in January 2016, when Netflix released a dubbed version of very low quality. The French version, which had been recorded in South Africa by non-professional actors, was called "the worst dubbing in history". Netflix reacted to the negative reception by removing the film from its French platform and ordering a redub by Titrafilm studio.
