= Ochre House Theater =

- Address: 825 Exposition Avenue; Dallas, Texas; United States
- Capacity: c. 50
- Type: Storefront theater

Construction
- Opened: 2008

Website
- ochrehousetheater.org

The Ochre House Theater is a small nonprofit storefront theater in the Exposition Park neighborhood of Dallas, Texas, near Fair Park and the main gate of the State Fair of Texas. Founded in 2008 by the actor, writer, and director Matthew Posey, the roughly 50-seat company is known for staging original, experimental productions that combine live music, puppetry, dance, and video, most of them written and directed by Posey. The company describes itself as the "Pioneers of the Suavant Garde."

== History ==
Before founding the Ochre House, Posey operated the Deep Ellum Theater Garage, an alternative theater he ran in Deep Ellum beginning in the early 1980s. After roughly eight seasons he moved to Los Angeles, where he worked for more than a decade as a film and television actor.

Posey returned to Dallas and opened the Ochre House in 2008. He has said he chose the Exposition Avenue storefront after noticing a small Hindu figurine mounted above the door, which he took as a sign. The space doubles as Posey's residence; he has lived in living quarters behind the stage. Current company members include Matthew Posey, Kevin Grammar, Carla Parker, and Justin Locklear.

== Productions and style ==
Nearly every Ochre House production is an original world premiere, and Posey writes, directs, and often performs in the work. Productions typically integrate live music, and the theater has served as a showcase for Dallas musicians, including Elizabeth Evans of the Polyphonic Spree and Stefan González of Yells at Eels. The company's work has ranged from puppet-driven pieces to biographical plays about figures such as Hunter S. Thompson, William S. Burroughs, and Frida Kahlo.

Productions that have received press coverage include Coppertone (2009) and The Butcher (2011), a macabre musical about a singing serial killer; Old: A Vaudeville Tragedy in Two Acts (2013); Dr. Bobaganush (2017); and Moving Creatures (2025), a political satire set in a Gilded Age-style landscape.

== Recognition ==
The Ochre House has been recognized repeatedly in the Dallas Observer's annual "Best of Dallas" awards, including honors for Best Theater and Best Theater Director in 2012, Best Small Theater in 2014, Best Theater Company in 2016 and 2023, and additional director and play awards in intervening years. The theater has also been highlighted by D Magazine and regional outlets as one of Dallas's most distinctive small theaters.

== 2017 shooting of Matthew Posey ==
On the night of January 30, 2017, Posey was shot twice in the parking lot of the Cold Beer Company bar in Deep Ellum, a short distance from the theater, as he was getting into a vehicle. He was struck in the face and thigh and treated at Baylor University Medical Center for non-life-threatening injuries; the assailant fled and no motive was immediately established. Posey returned to the stage in the company's production of Dr. Bobaganush following his recovery.

== See also ==
- Fair Park
