= 1 Night in San Diego =

2020 American comedy film

- Film poster
- Directed by: Penelope Lawson
- Written by: Penelope Lawson
- Produced by: Penelope Lawson; Pierce Cravens; Rowan Russell
- Starring: Jenna Ushkowitz; Laura Ashley Samuels; Alexandra Daddario; Eric Nelsen; Mark Lawson; Adam Rose; Brian Borello; Nicolas DiPierro; Kelsey Douglas
- Cinematography: Arlen Konopaki
- Edited by: Jarrett Keisling
- Music by: Joe Avid; Brian Hingerty
- Production companies: Pink Revolver Pictures; Metropolitan Entertainment
- Distributed by: 1091 Media
- Release date: November 17, 2020
- Running time: 86 minutes
- Country: United States
- Language: English

1 Night in San Diego is a 2020 American comedy film written and directed by Penelope Lawson. The film stars Jenna Ushkowitz, Laura Ashley Samuels, and Alexandra Daddario and was released on video on demand on November 17, 2020 during the COVID-19 pandemic.

== Development ==
Lawson stated that she saw a dearth of female buddy comedies and wanted to make one. The premise of the film comes from how as a former New Yorker moving to L.A., Lawson first thought that the city and San Diego were far enough from one other to constitute a road trip.

Principal photography took place in Southern California, with filming occurring in Los Angeles and San Diego. Lawson has described the production as an independent film made with a relatively small budget, noting that the cast and crew relied on local locations to depict the nightlife and landmarks of San Diego. She also cited films such as Bridesmaids (2011) and Romy and Michele's High School Reunion (1997) as influences on the film's female-led comedic dynamic.

== Plot ==
Hannah, a former reality star, and Brooklyn, a social media influencer, are best friends and wannabe celebrities who have recently moved out to Hollywood. Facing personal and professional woes, they accept an invitation to spend time with a former high school crush in San Diego. When they ultimately find him unappealing, they decide to spend a debauchery-filled night out in the city with two fans of Hannah that will test the limits of their friendship.

== Cast ==
- Jenna Ushkowitz as Hannah
- Laura Ashley Samuels as Brooklyn
- Alexandra Daddario as Kelsey
- Eric Nelsen as Gordo
- Mark Lawson as Christian
- Adam Rose as Kevin
- Brian Borello as Teddy
- Kelsey Douglas as Delia
- Nicolas diPierro as Concierge
- Donna Pieroni as Joyce

== Release ==
The film was released on VOD and digital platforms on November 17, 2020.

The film was released directly to video on demand rather than theatrically, a distribution strategy adopted by many independent productions during the COVID-19 pandemic. It became available on major digital platforms through distributor 1091 Media on 17 November 2020.

== Reception ==
Critical reception was mixed. On Rotten Tomatoes, the film holds an approval rating of 43% based on two critic reviews.

Brian Orndorf of Blu-ray.com gave the film a 6 out of 10, praising director Lawson on the plot of the film and calls the performances of Jenna Ushkowitz and Laura Ashley Samuels as "lively" and a "comedic chaos that scores just a bit more than it misses". Alan Ng of Film Threat gave the film 8 out of 10, describing the plot "pretty basic" and concludes the friendship and adventure plots as "pretty much our story". Roger Moore of Movie Nation as describes the film as, "you want to love it, you’re lucky if you find a few moments where "like" isn’t a stretch," and gave it 1.5 stars out of 4.
