= The Final (film) =

- Theatrical release poster
- Directed by: Joey Stewart
- Written by: Jason Kabolati
- Produced by: Jason Kabolati
- Starring: Marc Donato; Jascha Washington Whitney Hoy; Julin; Lindsay Seidel; Laura Ashley Samuels; Justin S. Arnold; Travis Tedford; Eric Isenhower; Vincent Silochan
- Cinematography: Dave McFarland
- Edited by: Bill Marcellus
- Music by: Damon Criswell
- Production company: Agora Entertainment
- Distributed by: After Dark Films
- Release date: January 29, 2010 (After Dark Horrorfest)
- Running time: 93 minutes
- Country: United States
- Language: English

The Final is a 2010 American independent psychological horror thriller film written by Jason Kabolati, directed by Joey Stewart, and starring Jascha Washington, Julin, Justin S. Arnold, Lindsay Seidel, Marc Donato, Laura Ashley Samuels, Ryan Hayden, and Travis Tedford. It was the last film to feature Washington and Tedford before their retirement.

== Plot ==
A disfigured teenage girl enters a restaurant and quickly draws the attention of everyone there. She begins crying, and a flashback begins.

In high school, Ravi gets bullied by Bradley and Bernard. Emily is taunted and abused by three girls, Heather, Bridget, and Kelli. Dane, another outcast, has an old, secluded house in the woods, inherited from his late uncle.

Kurtis is a likable student and an aspiring actor. He invites his schoolmates to a video shoot. There, Bradley and Bernard insult Ravi in the restroom and break his camera. Dane stumbles in, and Bradley intimidates him, thus revealing that he has also been bullying Dane. The next day at school, after learning of the incident, Kurtis confronts Bradley, asking him to leave his friends alone.

The outcasts - Emily, Jack, Ravi, Andy, and Dane - decide to get revenge on the bullies and send a message to the community. Among their inspirations are horror films, lessons in class about deadly chemicals, and torture methods of old cultures. They plan to spare Kurtis, as he doesn't mistreat them. They prepare a costume party at Dane's secluded house and invite the bullies over. They lace the punch bowl with a drug, causing everyone who drinks from it to fall unconscious. They see Kurtis among the group but still proceed with the plan.

When the teens wake up, they find themselves chained together. The outcasts then declare their intention: to make them suffer a fate worse than death as revenge for the years they have suffered from bullying. In their first act of revenge, Jack shoots Miles, a loud-mouthed teenager, with a cattle gun in the face and the knee. One boy, Tommy, flees for help but steps into a bear trap in the woods. Three boys, nicknamed The Triplets, help the outcasts capture and return him to the house.

Ravi immobilizes and silences Bernard with a drug, and then Bernard is tortured with needles by Emily. Ravi secretly gives Kurtis a key, and he escapes. Dane, obsessed with revenge, stabs and kills Ravi. The torture continues with Emily smearing a corrosive compound on Heather's face. As Bridget apologizes to Emily, she tells her to cut off Bradley's fingers to spare herself. She refuses, but when Bradley is given the same choice, he reluctantly agrees and cuts two of Bridget's fingers off. Bridget then relents and agrees to cut Bradley's off, but is still unable to do so, prompting Emily to apply the same compound to half of Bridget's face before it starts to burn.

Kurtis encounters Deputy Henessey and asks for help, but the Triplets shoot the Deputy. Kurtis grabs his gun, flees to a neighboring house, and informs the owner, Parker, an elderly war veteran, of the events in Dane's house. However, Parker doesn't trust Kurtis because he has a gun. After tying Kurtis to an armchair, Parker goes to Dane's house alone to investigate. He trips over a cord, and a trap severely injures his legs. Despite the injuries, he successfully kills two of the Triplets.

A crazed Dane taunts Bradley, who attempts to apologize. Dane severs his spinal cord with a switchblade, paralyzing him from the waist down. After freeing himself, Kurtis calls the police and heads to Dane's house. As Andy is about to cut off Riggs' tongue, Kurtis appears and kills Andy. Dane shoots Kurtis in the arm, but Emily kills him before he can kill Kurtis. Emily then has Jack shoot her in the back of the head, and as the police burst in, Jack kills himself after saying, "There are more like us out there."

The next day, a news reporter recounts how the popular kids were abducted and tortured "without reason." Kelli, unharmed but traumatized by the events, plans to die by suicide. At school, Kurtis exchanges eye contact with the remaining Triplet. The final scene reveals that Bridget is the disfigured girl from the film's beginning.

== Cast ==
- Marc Donato as Dane
- Jascha Washington as Kurtis
- Whitney Hoy as Bridget
- Julin as Heather
- Lindsay Seidel as Emily
- Laura Ashley Samuels as Kelli
- Justin S. Arnold as Bradley
- Travis Tedford as Andy
- Eric Isenhower as Jack
- Vincent Silochan as Ravi
- Farah White as The Reporter
- Preston Flagg as Riggs
- Hunter Garner as Tommy
- Ryan Hayden as Miles
- Daniel Ross Owens as Bernard
- Matthew Posey as Parker

== Release ==
The film is part of the After Dark Horrorfest 2012 and was presented on November 23. The DVD was released on November 23 by After Dark Films.

== Reviews ==
The Movie Spot gave the film a 3.5 out of 5 saying, "The Final is a decent movie. And a great entry to the Horrorfest series." The film holds a 13% "rotten" rating on Rotten Tomatoes, based on eight reviews.
