= Electric Jesus =

- Poster
- Directed by: Chris White
- Written by: Chris White
- Produced by: Emily Reach; Chris White
- Starring: Brian Baumgartner; Andrew Eakle; Caleb Hoffmann; Wyatt Lenhart; Will Oliver; Gunner Willis; Shannon Hutchison; Shawn Parsons; Judd Nelson
- Distributed by: 1091 Pictures
- Release date: October 29, 2020 (Orlando)
- Running time: 107 minutes
- Country: United States
- Language: English

Electric Jesus is a 2020 American musical comedy drama film written and directed by Chris White and starring Brian Baumgartner.

== Plot ==
In the summer of 1986, Erik (Andrew Eakle), a shy teenage sound technician, joins 316, a Christian hair metal band from South Carolina determined to "make Jesus famous." When flashy promoter Skip Wick offers the band a bus tour of church gigs across the American South, Erik and the band embrace the opportunity despite the complications it brings. Their journey is complicated further when Sarah, a pastor's daughter, stows away on the band's tour vehicle, becoming the band's muse, a rival opening act, and Erik's first love, as the group navigates personal ambition (to open for Stryper), religious conviction, youthful idealism, and the realities of life on the road.

== Background ==
Writer-director Chris White was raised in Southern Baptist evangelical culture and conceived the film as an authentic portrayal of teenage Christian life in the 1980s. "Most churchy people in movies are portrayed as sinister, stupid, or superheroes," White told American Songwriter. "My friends were weird and funny and flawed — and sincerely loved Jesus, each other, and Christian rock music."

Stryper, the real-life Christian metal band, is central to the film's narrative — the fictional band 316 spends the summer attempting to secure an opening slot on a tour featuring Stryper. The band performs Stryper's "Makes Me Wanna Sing" at a Christian summer camp, and a key scene features the band lip-syncing to "To Hell with the Devil" on their tour bus — described by HM Magazine founder Doug Van Pelt as the film's equivalent of the "Tiny Dancer" bus scene in Almost Famous. White cited Stryper as a formative personal influence: "We revered bands like Stryper who talked non-ironically about Jesus, but played cool music and looked like legit rock stars."

The film's original songs and score were composed by Daniel Smith of Danielson Famile, whose compositions span hard rock, metal, bluegrass, and pop to capture the sonic landscape of 1986 Christian hair metal.

== Cast ==
- Brian Baumgartner as Skip Wick
- Judd Nelson as Pastor Wember
- Shawn Parsons as Chris Angelopoulos
- Rhoda Griffis as Donna
- Claire Bronson as Rebekah
- Andrew Eakle as Erik
- Shannon Hutchinson as Sarah
- Wyatt Lenhart as Michael
- Caleb Hoffman as Scotty
- Gunner Willis as Cliff
- Will Oliver as Jamie
- Jef Holbrook as Snarky Fan
- Shua Jackson as Roadie

== Production ==
Filming occurred in Columbus, Georgia in 2019.

== Release ==
The film was released on October 29, 2020 at the Orlando Film Festival. The film was also shown at the Rome, Georgia International Film Festival on November 12, 2020.

In July 2021, it was announced that 1091 Pictures acquired North American distribution and non-fungible token rights to the film.

The film was screened at the National Infantry Museum on October 30, 2021. It was released on November 2, 2021.

== Reception ==
Brandy Lynn Sebren of MovieWeb gave the film a positive review and wrote, "If you can check 'yes, please' to Spinal Tap, Napoleon Dynamite, and Almost Famous, you've got yourself a wonderful treat to look forward to."

HM Magazine founder Doug Van Pelt praised the film's authentic portrayal of Christian metal culture, noting that it captures "the sonic landscape of 1986 with a meticulous eye for detail."
