= Laura Ashley Samuels =

American actress

- Occupation: Actress
- Years active: 2010–present

Laura Ashley Samuels is an American actress. She is best known for playing Courtney on Awkward, Beth on Modern Family and Pfeiffer on Lopez.

Samuels has also appeared in films such as The Final (2010), In Time (2011), Dumbbells (2014), and Walk of Fame (2017).

== Career ==
Samuels began her acting career in 2010 with the role, Kelli in the horror film, The Final. She followed with guest appearances on American teen sitcoms, True Jackson, VP and Wizards of Waverly Place. In 2011, she starred in the action thriller film, In Time alongside Justin Timberlake, Amanda Seyfried and Olivia Wilde, as Sagita and also guest starred in the teen drama, 90210.

In 2012, Samuels starred in three episodes of Awkward. as high school freshman, Courtney. She also starred in the comedy film, Dumbbells as Candy, and had a guest appearance in an episode of Raising Hope as Abigail.

In 2015, Samuels starred in five episodes of Modern Family as Beth, U.S. Coast Guard and ex-fiancée of Andy Bailey, played by Adam DeVine. In 2017, she had a lead role in the comedy film, Walk of Fame with Scott Eastwood and Cory Hardrict as ex-flight attendant, Nikki. She also starred in six episodes of Lopez as Olly's younger sister, Pfeiffer, and starred in an episode of Workaholics.

Samuels starred in the comedy film, 1 Night in San Diego as Brooklyn, alongside Alexandra Daddario, Jenna Ushkowitz and Eric Nelsen. The film was released on November 17, 2020. In 2025, Samuels stars in the upcoming crime comedy film, Oxy Morons as Ashley, alongside Jeremy Sumpter.

== Filmography ==
=== Film ===
Year	Title	Role	Notes
2010	The Final	Kelli	
2010	Monster Heroes	Tambi	
2011	In Time	Sagita	
2011	Getting That Girl	Trendy Girl	
2013	The Cheating Pact	Kylie Hamilton	Television film
2013	April Apocalypse	Jess	
2014	Dumbbells	Candy	
2014	The Life Lessons of William Gwilliam	Sarah	
2016	Barrio Tales 2	Bella	
2017	Walk of Fame	Nikki	
2018	Kill Game	Courtney	
2020	1 Night in San Diego	Brooklyn	
2025	Oxy Morons	Ashley	

=== Television ===
Year	Title	Role	Notes
2010	True Jackson, VP	Bijou Stinkbottom	Episode: "The Hunky Librarian"
2010	Wizards of Waverly Place	Sara	Episode: "Moving On"
2011	90210	Female staff Member	Episode: "Vegas, Maybe?"
2012	Raising Hope	Abigail	Episode: "Mrs. Smartypants"
2012	Awkward	Courtney	3 episodes
2015	Modern Family	Beth	5 episodes
2017	Workaholics	Party Girl	Episode: "Party Gawds"
2017	Lopez	Pfeiffer	6 episodes
