= Mark Lawson (actor) =

American actor (born 1979)

- Born: December 17, 1979 (age 46); Bristol, Virginia, U.S.
- Occupation: Actor
- Years active: 2005–present

Mark Lawson (born December 17, 1979) is an American actor known for portraying Brody Lovett on the ABC soap opera One Life to Live.

== Early life ==
Lawson grew up in Bristol, Virginia, and later studied at the Boston Conservatory, where he earned his BFA in musical theatre, and London Academy of Music and Dramatic Art.

== Career ==
Lawson's first role was as Jerry Stone in the 2005 Cold Case episode "Yo, Adrian". After five years in Los Angeles, he was about to give up on acting when he landed the role of ex-Navy SEAL Brody Lovett on the ABC soap opera One Life to Live and moved to New York in March 2008. Lawson played the character until the series ended in 2012. In July 2019, Lawson began appearing as Dustin Phillips on General Hospital.

Lawson is also a personal trainer and runs a strength and conditioning business, called Forge.

== Filmography ==
Year	Series	Role	Notes
2005	Cold Case	Jerry Stone	Episode: "Yo, Adrian"
2008–2012	One Life to Live	Brody Lovett	Contract role
2019	Animal Kingdom	Lena's foster father	Episode: "SHTF"
2019–2020	General Hospital	Dustin Phillips	Recurring
2020	1 Night in San Diego	Christian	Direct to video
