= Brian Baumgartner =

American actor (born 1972)

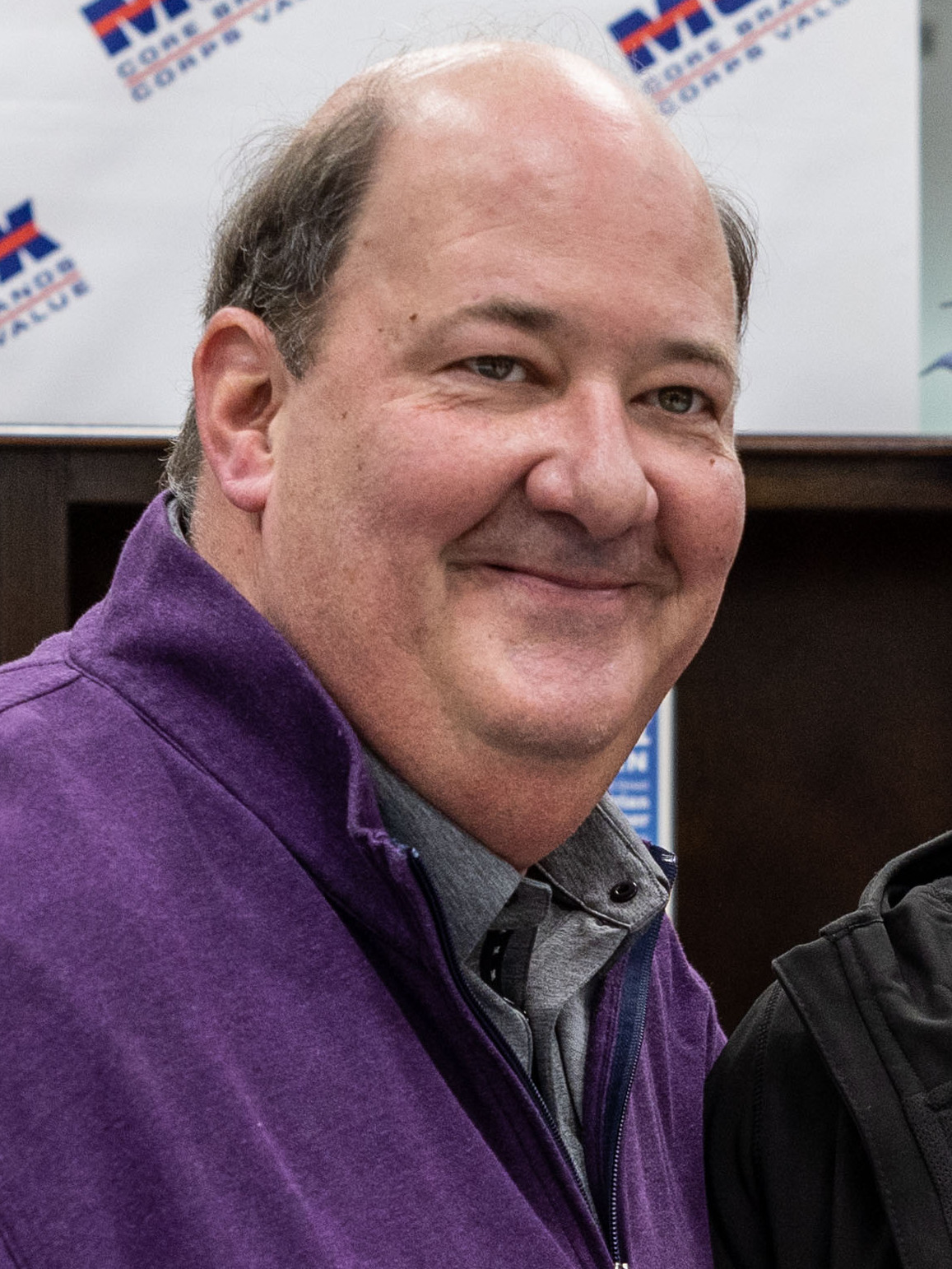
- Baumgartner in 2023
- Born: November 29, 1972 (age 53); Atlanta, Georgia, U.S.
- Education: Southern Methodist University (BFA)
- Occupation: Actor
- Years active: 2001–present
- Spouse: Celeste Ackelson (m. 2014)
- Children: 1

Brian Baumgartner (born November 29, 1972) is an American actor. He is best known for his role as Kevin Malone on the NBC sitcom The Office (2005–2013) and its related spin-off webisodes, which earned him two Screen Actors Guild Awards and a Daytime Emmy Award.

Baumgartner had starring roles in Into Temptation (2009), Ordinary World (2016), and Electric Jesus (2020). He had a supporting voice role in Rumble (2021). Baumgartner had a main voice role as Walter on the Netflix animated series Trash Truck (2020–2021), as well as recurring roles on the Amazon Prime Video series Hand of God (2017) and the Hulu series The Other Black Girl (2023).

== Early life and education ==
Born in Atlanta, Georgia, and of Austrian descent, Baumgartner attended Holy Innocents' Episcopal School. He attended and graduated from The Westminster Schools in 1991, one year before his co-star on The Office Ed Helms graduated. During his time at The Westminster School, Baumgartner competed in competitive speech events for drama, reaching the national finals his senior year. Between his junior and senior year of high school, he also attended Northwestern University's National High School Institute, and focused on theater there. Baumgartner later attended Southern Methodist University, where he majored in theater and graduated in 1995.

He later moved to Los Angeles and was Artistic Director of Hidden Theatre in Minneapolis, where he received multiple awards for artistic and acting excellence. Baumgartner later performed regionally at the Guthrie Theater, Berkeley Repertory Theatre, Children's Theater Company, and Theatre de la Jeune Lune.

== Career ==
Baumgartner has had roles on the television shows Jake in Progress, Arrested Development and Everwood. He served as a celebrity talent scout on Last Comic Standing with his The Office co-star Kate Flannery and starred with Robin Williams, Mandy Moore and John Krasinski in License to Wed. He also appeared in Ingrid Michaelson's music video for "Time Machine".

In October 2025, Baumgartner became a spokesperson in adverts for the financial technology company Ramp. Baumgartner's The Office co-star Andy Buckley also made an appearance.

=== The Office ===
Baumgartner is best known for portraying accountant Kevin Malone in the American remake of the British series The Office. In June 2007, he won a Daytime Emmy Award for Outstanding Broadband Program – Comedy for his work on The Office: The Accountants webisodes. His co-stars Angela Kinsey and Oscar Nunez also shared the award. In 2020, he hosted and executive produced An Oral History of The Office, a podcast for Spotify that featured interviews with his The Office co-stars. In 2021, he hosted and executive produced a podcast for iHeart: The Office Deep Dive with Brian Baumgartner. This podcast features the full-length, in-depth interviews with the cast and crew originally heard in An Oral History of The Office.

=== Golf podcast ===
He has a golf podcast called We Need a Fourth, with Cooper Manning and Kenny Mayne, which is produced by SmartLess Media.

== Personal life ==
Baumgartner married Celeste Ackelson in 2014. Together they have a daughter.

== Filmography ==
=== Film ===
Year	Title	Role	Notes
2001	Herman U. S. A.	Roger	
2006	Moosecock	Paul Wood	Short film
2006	No. 6	Boris	Short film
2007	Smith and Mike on a Tuesday	Bob	Short film
2007	License to Wed	Jim	
2008	Four Christmases	Eric	
2009	Into Temptation	Fr. Ralph O'Brien	
2010	Dirty Girl	Concierge	Uncredited
2012	Astronaut: The Last Push	Bob Jansen	
2016	Ordinary World	Rupert	
2016	Ghostbusters	Frank	Scenes deleted; only available on extended cut; Uncredited
2016	Diagnosis Delicious	Dr. Ed Paulson	Television film
2018	One Last Night	Escott	
2020	My Boyfriend's Meds	Chase	
2020	Electric Jesus	Skip Wick	
2021	Rumble	Klonk (voice)	
2024	Confessions of a Christmas Letter	Sam	Television film

=== Television ===
Year	Title	Role	Notes
2003	The Lyon's Den	Al Grissom	Episode: "The Fifth"
2003	CSI: Crime Scene Investigation	Dog Man	Episode: "Fur and Loathing"
2004	LAX	Wes	Episode: "Credible Threat"
2005	Arrested Development	Vendor	Episode: "Burning Love"
2005	Jake in Progress	Michael	Episode: "Jake or the Fat Man"
2005	Everwood	Contractor	Episode: "Good to Go"
2005–2013	The Office	Kevin Malone	Recurring (season 1), main role (season 2–9); Director (Episode: "After Hours")
2008	Celebrity Family Feud	Himself	Baumgartner played the captain, he and his team (other cast members) won and donated $50,000 to Children's Advocacy Center of Northeastern Pennsylvania.
2011	Adventure Time	Georgy / Private in Movie (voice)	Episode: "Heat Signature"
2012	Wilfred	Orderly #2	Episode: "Progress"
2013	Mike & Molly	Mr. Wisney	Episode: "Molly Unleashed"
2013; 2015	Hot in Cleveland	Claude	2 episodes
2014	Maker Shack Agency	Principal Downing	Television pilot
2014	Criminal Minds	Bill Harding	Episode: "Fatal"
2014	Law & Order: Special Victims Unit	Gordon Montlieff	Episode: "Thought Criminal"
2014	Bad Teacher	Officer Edmund	Episode: "Fieldtrippers"
2014	Rake	George Copley	Episode: "Mammophile"
2014	The Bridge	Gary	2 episodes
2015	Nicky, Ricky, Dicky & Dawn	JD McCoy	Episode: "I Want Candace"
2015	Melissa & Joey	Hank Jeffers	3 episodes
2015	The Mr. Peabody & Sherman Show	King Hotu Mat'u (voice)	Episode: "Hotu Mat'u"
2016	The Crossroads of History	John Frederick Parker	Episode: "Lincoln"
2016	Scream Queens	Richard	Episode: "Warts and All"
2016	Blunt Talk	Prison guard	Episode: "A Cell Doesn't Have to Be a Closet"
2016	Chicago Fire	Scott Powers	Episode: "That Day"
2016; 2018	The Goldbergs	Larry / Mr. Schernecke	2 episodes
2017	Hand of God	Dr. Olonari	4 episodes
2017	Life in Pieces	Dean	Episode: "Late Smuggling Dreambaby Voucher"
2017	Good Behavior	Patrick Donnelly	2 episodes
2018	Disjointed	Krinkles	Episode: "Travissimo Private Reserve"
2019	Summer Camp Island	Storm Cloud / additional voices (voice)	Episode: "Cosmic Bupkiss"
2020	Home Movie: The Princess Bride	Fezzik	Episode: "Chapter Three: The Cliffs of Insanity"
2020	Sneakerheads	Old Boss	Episode: "Hustling Backwards"
2020–2021	Trash Truck	Walter / additional voices (voice)	Main role
2020	A Trash Truck Christmas	Walter (voice)	Television special
2021	Last Week Tonight with John Oliver	Himself	1 episode
2023	The Other Black Girl	Colin Franklin	3 episodes
2023	Celebrity Jeopardy!	Himself	Contestant
2024	Krapopolis	Casey (voice)	Episode: "Ty Man Woman Table Chairs Food"
2025	Suits LA	Himself	2 episodes

=== Web series ===
Year	Title	Role	Notes
2006	The Office: The Accountants	Kevin Malone	Main role
2008	The Office: Kevin's Loan	Kevin Malone	Main role
2008	The Office: The Outburst	Kevin Malone	Main role
2009	The Office: Subtle Sexuality	Kevin Malone	Episode: "The Replacement"
2010	The Office: The Mentor	Kevin Malone	Main role
2010	The Office: The 3rd Floor	Kevin Malone	Main role
2011	The Office: The Podcast	Kevin Malone	Main role
2011	The Office: The Girl Next Door	Kevin Malone	Episode: "The Story of Subtle Sexuality"
2014	Charles, Your Hangover	Sonny	Episode: "BFF"

== Awards and nominations ==
Year	Award	Category	Nominated work	Result
2007	Daytime Emmy Awards	Outstanding Broadband Program – Comedy	The Office: The Accountants	Won
2007	TV Guide Awards	Favorite Ensemble	The Office	Won
2007	Screen Actors Guild Awards	Outstanding Performance by an Ensemble in a Comedy Series	The Office	Won
2008	TV Land Awards	Future Classic Award	The Office	Won
2008	Screen Actors Guild Awards	Outstanding Performance by an Ensemble in a Comedy Series	The Office	Won
2009	Screen Actors Guild Awards	Outstanding Performance by an Ensemble in a Comedy Series	The Office	Nominated
2010	Screen Actors Guild Awards	Outstanding Performance by an Ensemble in a Comedy Series	The Office	Nominated
2011	Screen Actors Guild Awards	Outstanding Performance by an Ensemble in a Comedy Series	The Office	Nominated
2012	Screen Actors Guild Awards	Outstanding Performance by an Ensemble in a Comedy Series	The Office	Nominated
2013	Screen Actors Guild Awards	Outstanding Performance by an Ensemble in a Comedy Series	The Office	Nominated
