= Literally, Right Before Aaron =

- Theatrical release poster
- Directed by: Ryan Eggold
- Written by: Ryan Eggold
- Produced by: Ryan Eggold; Ross Kohn; Cassandra Kulukundis; Nancy Leopardi
- Starring: Justin Long; Cobie Smulders; Ryan Hansen; John Cho; Kristen Schaal; Dana Delany; Manu Intiraymi; Peter Gallagher; Lea Thompson; Luis Guzmán
- Cinematography: Seamus Tierney
- Edited by: Ryan Eggold
- Music by: Ryan Eggold; David Goldman
- Production companies: Indy Entertainment; Rizk Pictures; Unison Films
- Distributed by: Screen Media Films
- Release dates: April 22, 2017 (Tribeca Film Festival); September 29, 2017 (United States)
- Running time: 97 minutes
- Country: United States
- Language: English

Literally, Right Before Aaron is a 2017 American comedy film written and directed by Ryan Eggold. The film stars Justin Long, Cobie Smulders, Ryan Hansen, John Cho, Kristen Schaal, Dana Delany, Peter Gallagher, Lea Thompson and Luis Guzmán. The film had its world premiere at the Tribeca Film Festival on April 22, 2017. The film was released on September 29, 2017, by Screen Media Films.

== Plot ==
Adam and Allison were college sweethearts. Adam is heartbroken when she breaks up with him, then finds himself in the odd predicament of being a "dear friend" invited to her wedding a year and a half later. At the rehearsal dinner, he is introduced by another friend as the guy who dated Allison "...literally, right before Aaron", the groom, started dating her. This leads to a sequence of events that eventually leads to Aaron chasing after him during the reception until he gets on a bus and leaves.

== Cast ==
- Justin Long as Adam
- Cobie Smulders as Allison
- Ryan Hansen as Aaron
- John Cho as Mark
- Kristen Schaal as Talula
- Dana Delany as Wendy (Allison's Mom)
- Peter Gallagher as Schwartzman
- Lea Thompson as Deb (Adam's Mom)
- Luis Guzmán as Federico
- Malcolm Barrett as Greg
- Briga Heelan as Julie
- Lo Mutuc (Note: Credited as Charlyne Yi) as Claire
- Charlotte McKinney as Charlotte
- Parvesh Cheena as Rohan
- Dov Tiefenbach as David
- Manu Intiraymi as Lee
- Adam Rose as Alan (Co-Worker)

== Release ==
The film premiered at the Tribeca Film Festival on April 22, 2017. On May 24, 2017, Screen Media Films acquired distribution rights to the film. The film was released on September 29, 2017, by Screen Media Films.

== Reception ==
The review aggregator website Rotten Tomatoes gives the film a rating of 21% based on 19 reviews, with an average rating of 3.9/10.
