= The Blue Butterfly =

- Film poster
- Directed by: Léa Pool
- Written by: Pete McCormack
- Starring: William Hurt; Pascale Bussières; Marc Donato
- Cinematography: Pierre Mignot
- Edited by: Michel Arcand
- Music by: Stephen Endelman
- Production companies: Galafilm; Global Arts Productions; Palpable Productions
- Distributed by: Film Tonic (Canada); Alliance Atlantis (international)
- Release date: February 20, 2004 (Quebec)
- Running time: 97 minutes
- Countries: Canada; United Kingdom
- Language: English
- Budget: C$12 million

The Blue Butterfly (French: Le papillon bleu) is a 2004 drama film directed by Léa Pool. A Quebec–United Kingdom co-production, it stars William Hurt, Pascale Bussières and Marc Donato. Inspired by a true story, the film centres on a terminally ill boy’s search for a rare blue morpho butterfly. It won Best Cinematography at the 2005 Jutra Awards and was screened at the 2004 Mar del Plata International Film Festival.

== Synopsis ==
The film follows a ten-year-old boy with terminal cancer who is fascinated by butterflies. His final wish is to find the rare blue morpho butterfly, which lives in tropical rainforests. After his mother persuades an entomologist to help, the boy sets off for the rainforest in search of the rare butterfly. During the expedition, he confronts his fears and illness.

== Cast ==
The cast includes:

- William Hurt as Alan Osborn
- Pascale Bussières as Teresa Carlton
- Marc Donato as Pete Carlton
- Raoul Max Trujillo as Alejo
- Marianella Jimenez as Yana
- Gerardo Hernandez as Manolo
- Steve Adams as Moderator
- Silverio Morales as Diego, the shaman

== Production ==
The film was inspired by the story of David Marenger, a Canadian boy with cancer, and Quebec entomologist Georges Brossard. A Quebec–United Kingdom co-production, the film was produced by Galafilm, Global Arts Productions and Palpable Productions. It was filmed in Montreal and Costa Rica on an estimated budget of C$12 million.

== Reception ==
=== Awards ===
At the 2004 Giffoni Film Festival, the film was ranked third among feature films in the Free to Fly section and received the Ministry for Arts and Culture Award. The film won Best Cinematography for Pierre Mignot at the 2005 Jutra Awards.

=== Critical response ===
Variety wrote that the film lacked "fun, originality and depth". The review found the characters thinly developed and the film visually static, but praised Pierre Mignot's close-up photography of insects and small animals as "superb". Filmdienst described the film as sentimental and wrote that its treatment of the story was too superficial to work fully either as a children's film or as a social-issue drama. Filmpodium quoted Neue Zürcher Zeitung as writing that the film was convincing in its balance between external action and understated suggestion.

== Festival screenings ==
The film was screened in the Official Section of the 2004 Mar del Plata International Film Festival.
