= Sick Boy (film) =

- Directed by: Tim T. Cunningham; Sean C. Cunningham; Helen McCole Bartusiak
- Written by: Tim T. Cunningham
- Produced by: Tim T. Cunningham
- Starring: Skye McCole Bartusiak; Marc Donato
- Cinematography: Sean C. Cunningham
- Edited by: Anna Crane (editor); Tim T. Cunningham (supervising editor)
- Music by: Matt Linder
- Production company: Goat Man's Hill
- Release date: 30 October 2012 (DVD)
- Running time: 84 minutes
- Country: United States
- Language: English
- Budget: $200,000 (estimate)

Sick Boy is an American Indie horror-thriller, written and directed by Tim T. Cunningham and starring Skye McCole Bartusiak, Marc Donato and Debbie Rochon. It was Bartusiak's final film role before her death in 2014.

== Premise ==
Lucy (Skye McCole Bartusiak), a trainee dentist, lands a job of a lifetime as a babysitter for a very rich family whose young son Jeremy is confined to his room due to a mysterious illness, she later discovers that his mother (Debbie Rochon), is keeping a deadly secret.

== Cast ==
- Skye McCole Bartusiak as Lucy
- Marc Donato as Chris
- Debbie Rochon as Dr. Helen Gordon
- Cas Rooney as Jeremy Gordon
- Greg Dorchak as Walter Gordon
- Pierre Kennel as Officer Andy Pohlman
- Teresa Valenza as Alice
- Joe Calvin Anderson as Hospital Police Officer (credited as Joe Anderson)

== Film rating ==
The film is rated R16 in New Zealand for horror scenes and violence. It has also been rated 18 in the United Kingdom by the BBFC for containing strong violence and gore.

== Reception ==
Nerdly said, "there’s enough original ideas here to keep even the most jaded of zombie movie fan watching." Another reviewer said, "With a decent enough budget, what most will really remember about Sick Boy is the cinematography. It looks great and helps ramp up the tension during the middle portion of the film which is when it’s at its best. Such a shame."
