= Disaster Date =

American hidden camera TV show

- Genre: Hidden camera
- Starring: Bethany Dwyer; David Barton Harris; Jeff Galante; Cameron Goodman; Parker Snow; Alejandro Cole; Fahim Anwar; Brian Drolet; Hasan Minhaj; Emily Wilson; Jasmine McAtee; Henry Milton Chu; Justin Hires; Bradley Kell; K-Von
- Country of origin: United States
- Original language: English
- No. of seasons: 4
- No. of episodes: 80

Production
- Executive producers: Joel Zimmer; SallyAnn Salsano; Pam LaLima
- Running time: 25 minutes
- Production companies: 495 Productions; MTV Networks

Original release
- Network: MTV
- Release: September 28, 2009 – July 18, 2011

Disaster Date is an American hidden camera TV-show on MTV in which actors go on a blind date with a person. The series premiered on September 28, 2009, ended on July 18, 2011 and was filmed in Los Angeles, California.

== Premise ==
Each episode usually has three separate dates. Each blind date is set up by the participant's friend, who usually gives a back story about the participant, along with three things that they hate. From there, they go on a date with an undercover actor, who exhibits the three things that the participant hates. Each date lasts 60 minutes, and for every minute the person lasts, they earn one dollar. If they last for the entire date, they earn the full 60 dollars. If the participant walks out on the date early, or the date reaches 60 minutes, the actor will reveal the ruse and present them with the money.

A total of 13,404 dollars was awarded throughout the show's entirety, counting an additional 222 dollars given on four double dates.

== Episodes ==
Season	Ep #	First airdate	Last airdate
1	20	September 28, 2009	January 21, 2010
2	20	March 29, 2010	April 28, 2010
3	20	June 26, 2010	August 1, 2010
4	20	May 16, 2011	July 18, 2011
