= Ringmaster =

Ringmaster or The Ringmaster may refer to:

- Ringmaster (circus), the leader of a circus
- Ringmaster (horse show), the manager of a horse show ring

== Entertainment ==
- Ringmaster (film), a 1998 film starring Jerry Springer as a talk show host and Jaime Pressly
- Ring Master, a Malayalam comedy film starring Dileep and directed by Rafi of the Rafi-Mecartin duo
- The Ringmaster (film), a 2019 American documentary film
- Ringmaster (comics), a supervillain created by Marvel Comics
- The Ringmaster (novel), a 1991 novel by Morris West
- The Ringmaster, a novel by Vanda Symon
- Ringmaster, a spaceship in John Varley's 1979 book Titan
- The Ringmaster, a short-lived gimmick of professional wrestler Stone Cold Steve Austin
- Ringmasters ("Ringmeister" in German), an honorific nickname commonly given to racing drivers for excellence at the Nürburgring circuit
- Ringmasters, fictional crime lords and central antagonists in the animated series Rimba Racer

== Music ==
- Ringmaster (album), a 1994 album by Insane Clown Posse
- Ringmaster (soundtrack), a soundtrack album from the 1998 film
- Ringmasters (barbershop quartet), a barbershop quartet
- Hot RingMasters, a chart published weekly by Billboard magazine in the United States
- "The Ringmaster", a song by Korn from The Nothing
