= Lopez (TV series) =

- Genre: Sitcom
- Created by: John Altschuler; Dave Krinsky; George Lopez; Jeff Stilson
- Starring: George Lopez; CiTRiC; Maronzio Vance; James Michael Connor; Hayley Huntley; Ashley Zamora; Ray Diaz
- Country of origin: United States
- Original language: English
- No. of seasons: 2
- No. of episodes: 24

Production
- Camera setup: Single-camera
- Production companies: Travieso Productions; Altschuler Krinsky Works; 3 Arts Entertainment; Dakota Pictures

Original release
- Network: TV Land
- Release: March 30, 2016 – June 21, 2017

Lopez is an American semi-autobiographical single-camera sitcom television series created by John Altschuler, Dave Krinsky and Jeff Stilson, starring George Lopez. TV Land gave a 12-episode straight-to-series order in August 2015. The series premiered on TV Land on March 30, 2016. On June 3, 2016, TV Land renewed Lopez for a second season.

On November 16, 2017, the series was cancelled after two seasons.

== Premise ==
The series follows a semi-fictionalized version of George Lopez and his day-to-day life, as he balances being a stand-up comedian while dealing with interpersonal relationships and trying to stay true to his roots in the Latino community. He also struggles to adjust to being a celebrity in a world where social media is his worst enemy.

The first season finds George working with new manager Olly, who helps him pursue a residency show in Las Vegas. The second season involves George and Olly trying to pitch a new detective show called Valleys to networks.

== Cast and characters ==
=== Main ===
- George Lopez as himself
- CiTRiC as Manolo, George's driver and confidant
- Maronzio Vance as Maronzio, George's friend and fellow stand-up comedian who is frequently his opening act
- James Michael Connor as Stephen (season 1), George's nosy and annoying neighbor
- Hayley Huntley as Olivia "Olly" Michaels, George's social media-savvy manager
- Ashley Zamora as Erica Lopez (season 1), George's teenage daughter
- Ray Diaz as Hector (season 2), Manolo's former cellmate who starts to live with him and George

=== Recurring ===
- Alexie Gilmore as Sheila, George's brief love interest (season 1)
- Zeke Nicholson as Gabrielo del Santo, an image consultant who works with Olly (season 1)
- Jacqueline Obradors as Alita, George's real estate agent (season 1)
- Austin Mincks as Tiddlypie, a rival comedian (season 1)
- Virginia Montero as Manolo's mom
- Gwen Holloway as Olly and Pfeiffer's mom
- Rain Valdez as Coco, a transgender actor slated to be the female lead for George's detective show (season 2)
- Natalie Lander as Rachel Naismith, a young TV producer (season 2)
- Laura Ashley Samuels as Pfeiffer, Olly's immature younger sister who is clearly their mother's favorite (season 2)
- Luenell as Miss Wendy, Manolo's GED teacher and love interest (season 2)
- Gillian Vigman as Lori Strahan, owner of a billion-dollar TV shopping network and George's love interest (season 2)

== Episodes ==
=== Series overview ===
Season	Episodes	Originally released	
Season	Episodes	First released	Last released
1	12	March 30, 2016	June 22, 2016
2	12	March 29, 2017	June 21, 2017

=== Season 1 (2016) ===
No. overall	No. in season	Title	Directed by	Written by	Original release date	Prod. code	US viewers (millions)
1	1	"Slave for a Day"	Troy Miller	Story by : John Altschuler & Dave Krinsky & George Lopez & Jeff Stilson; Teleplay by : John Altschuler & Dave Krinsky	March 30, 2016	101	0.65
George agrees to be auctioned off as "Slave for a Day" to benefit his daughter's school. Meanwhile, George is excited to be invited to Snoop Dogg's home, only to find out that Snoop just wants him there to keep his Hispanic maid company, as she is a huge fan of George.
2	2	"George Takes a Hike"	Troy Miller	John Altschuler & Dave Krinsky	April 6, 2016	102	0.49
George professes that he'd like to find a woman who wouldn't date him solely for his fame and money. He meets a woman named Sheila at a dog adoption center who seems to fit the bill, as she does not recognize him. George then gets frustrated when he tells Sheila he is a comedian but she equates "comedian" with "unemployed". Finally, after she searches for his name on Google, she realizes he is famous and arrives at his house.
3	3	"Down and Drought in Beverly Hills"	Troy Miller	Chip Pope	April 13, 2016	103	0.44
When a celebrity tours bus stops in front of George's home, neighbor Stephen is quick to point out that George's sprinklers are always running, something frowned upon in drought-stricken California. Olly and Gabrielo go into damage control mode, and encourage George to stem the tide of negative social media comments by letting the grounds in front of his house die and go brown.
4	4	"George's Party"	Troy Miller	Peter Murrieta	April 20, 2016	104	0.46
Thinking his neighbors will like him more if he has a get-together, Sheila convinces George to throw a big party in his house. But as the house fills up and no one wants to leave, someone calls the police with a noise complaint. When the police say the call came from the landline in the house, George owns up to calling them himself to get the people out. But it turns out he's covering for Erica, who made the call after seeing how miserable her dad was.
5	5	"Land of the Rings"	Troy Miller	Alan R. Cohen & Alan Freedland	April 27, 2016	105	0.43
George finds it difficult to go back to his childhood stomping grounds without someone hitting him up for a big donation. The last straw is when the school baseball team wins a championship, and the manager asks George to buy expensive championship rings for the players and anyone else associated with the team.
6	6	"George Hosts a Golf Tournament"	Troy Miller	Vince Calandra	May 4, 2016	106	0.46
When Adam Sandler backs out of hosting a charity golf tournament for Type 2 Diabetes, Olly and Gabrielo encourage George to host it. But soon, all the other celebrities Sandler had lined up also back out, and George is left with Jerry Seinfeld (or so he thinks) as the only big name star who will appear. Meanwhile, Erica tries to go to Burning Man without George's knowledge, and when he finds out, his worries for her impair his concentration while golfing.
7	7	"My $uper $weet $ixteen"	Troy Miller	Howard Kremer	May 11, 2016	107	0.39
George objects when Erica wants a lavish sweet sixteen party, until he learns there are rumors going around Erica's school that his career is on the skids and he desperately needs money.
8	8	"George Doubles Down"	Troy Miller	John Altschuler & Dave Krinsky	May 18, 2016	108	0.44
As George and Olly continue to push for a residency show in Las Vegas, Maronzio wants George to reschedule some of his current dates so he can spend time marketing a motivational program. Olly convinces George to replace Maronzio as his opening act. George's search for a replacement includes Kathy Griffin, who laughs at his offer. After not finding anyone suitable, George comes back around to Maronzio.
9	9	"George Gets Roasted"	Troy Miller	Chip Pope & Howard Kremer	May 25, 2016	109	0.39
Olly thinks it will be good publicity for George to be the target at a comedy roast, and numerous celebrities start lining up for a chance to take potshots at him. George goes on the hunt for good retaliation jokes, after a lawyer advises him that any material George developed while married could be claimed by his ex-wife as community property.
10	10	"George Needs Vegas"	Troy Miller	Peter Murrieta	June 1, 2016	110	0.44
As Olly and Gabrielo get close to closing the deal on a Vegas residency show for George, they determine he must develop an entirely new act, causing George to try and find comedy fodder in the world around him. With the residents from George's old neighborhood turning on him, he instead ponders developing a TV series starring himself as a Latino private investigator.
11	11	"Fear and Loving on the Way to Las Vegas"	Troy Miller	John Altschuler & Dave Krinsky	June 15, 2016	111	0.40
Because Manolo cannot leave California without permission from his parole officer, George has to drive himself to Vegas. The car breaks down in the desert and George gets help from a townie who is a big fan. Before fixing the car, the man takes George to his house, where he explains that George is his wife's "pass" (the one celebrity she can have sex with that won't count as cheating).
12	12	"George Goes All In"	Troy Miller	John Altschuler & Dave Krinsky	June 22, 2016	112	0.39
George learns that Tiddlypie filled in for his first night while he was delayed in the desert. He then has to deal with his new promoters who want to turn him into something he isn't by including racist overtones in his show. They also suggest that he ditch Maronzio as his opening act because they believe he doesn't help George expand his demographics. In the end, George wows his promoters and his first audience simply by talking and telling jokes about the events of the season.

=== Season 2 (2017) ===
No. overall	No. in season	Title	Directed by	Written by	Original release date	Prod. code	US viewers (millions)
13	1	"Leaving Las Vegas"	Jay Karas	John Altschuler & Dave Krinsky	March 29, 2017	201	0.37
George takes a trip back to California to visit with old friends. While there, he meets with Olly and tells her he is frustrated with doing the same show eight times a week for the last eight months, and wants out of his contract. This puts Olly in a panic and infuriates Maronzio, who was enjoying the Vegas life as George's opening act.
14	2	"Moving on and Moving in"	Jay Karas	John Altschuler & Dave Krinsky	April 5, 2017	202	0.35
While George gets settled in a new home, Olly tells him she has managed to get him out of his Vegas contract. She then arranges a meeting with ABC executives for George to pitch his idea of a "dramedy" about a San Fernando detective, starring himself. Meanwhile, Manolo learns he must pursue a GED as part of his parole agreement.
15	3	"Coco for Lopez"	Todd Biermann	Alan R. Cohen & Alan Freedland	April 12, 2017	203	0.31
George and Olly have a meeting with ABC to meet Coco (Rain Valdez), a proposed cast member for Valleys who is transgender. Problems ensue when Coco arrives fully expecting to be the star of the series. Elsewhere, Manolo begins classes for his GED and finds himself dealing with bullies, while Maronzio has a birthday party and doesn't invite George.
16	4	"George Dates His Daughter"	Todd Biermann	Sivert Glarum & Michael Jamin	April 19, 2017	204	0.37
Looking for female companionship, George signs up on a dating site and winds up getting a date request from Masiela Lusha, who played his daughter Carmen on the TV series George Lopez. Later, Constance Marie, who played George's TV wife Angie, shows up and appears to also be interested in dating him. It soon becomes clear that both women are hoping to be considered for the female lead in Valleys, unaware that the part has already been given to Coco.
17	5	"No Country Club for Young Men"	Peter Lauer	Chip Pope	April 26, 2017	205	0.28
To keep Hector out of trouble, George gets him a job at his country club, but Hector soon succumbs to the negative influence of a fellow employee. Meanwhile, Olly's annoying and immature sister Pfeiffer (Laura Ashley Samuels) returns home, causing stress.
18	6	"George Breaks In"	Peter Lauer	Marlena Rodriguez	May 3, 2017	206	0.30
Upon learning that Hector has been hooking up with "cougars" at the country club, George tries to steer him clear. Olly works to arrange meetings between George and potential writers for Valleys, but first, George is obligated to pitch a new grill on a home shopping channel run by the rich and beautiful Lori (Gillian Vigman). Maronzio suggests that Manolo take a break from his studies, and the two go out to a local club for open mic night.
19	7	"George Gets Schooled"	Steven Tsuchida	Philippe Iujvidin	May 10, 2017	207	0.35
George is invited to speak at a college in San Fernando. While he makes fun of Donald Trump and the border wall, he also uses microaggressions and pokes fun at how Trump's detractors on campus squash free speech. This angers the crowd, causes a social media nightmare for Olly, and leads to Lori becoming concerned about grill sales. Elsewhere, Manolo gets close to his GED teacher, Wendy (Luenell).
20	8	"George Clowns Around"	Steven Tsuchida	Howard Kremer	May 17, 2017	208	0.26
While George tries to save his reputation in the Latino community by appearing as a guest host on clown comic Platanito's show, he is angered to see that Lori is using Hector to pitch his grill on TV. Meanwhile, Manolo learns that he has to keep his relationship with Wendy a secret.
21	9	"Cuck You George Lopez"	Linda Mendoza	Alan R. Cohen & Alan Freedland	May 24, 2017	209	0.32
With the social media crisis successfully averted and grill sales resurging, George and Lori get close again. But George soon starts to feel emasculated when Lori wants to make all the decisions. Elsewhere, Olly starts seeing ramifications from her sister sleeping with both the male and female network executives, while Manolo decides to undergo laser eye surgery after learning that Wendy doesn't like him in glasses.
22	10	"Lost in Trans-lation"	Linda Mendoza	Sivert Glarum & Michael Jamin	May 31, 2017	210	0.32
While Hector struggles to sell additional products on Lori's network, George and Lori reconnect. Olly learns that Valleys is "on life support", partly because of fallout from Pfeiffer's affairs and partly because Coco has been missing appointments and making headlines for the wrong reasons. Meanwhile, Maronzio tries in vain to convince his ex-wife to take him back.
23	11	"The Show Might Go On"	Peter Lauer	John Altschuler & Dave Krinsky	June 14, 2017	211	0.28
After the script read-through, George and Olly are caught between creative integrity and George's need to find work when the network wants to cut Valleys to a half-hour and add more comedic elements. Elsewhere, a downtrodden Maronzio joins a religious group headed by ex-cons, while Manolo takes his final exams.
24	12	"Relevance"	Peter Lauer	John Altschuler & Dave Krinsky	June 21, 2017	212	0.31
Refusing to compromise and be part of a bad TV show, George decides to take Valleys away from the network and fund it via kickstarter campaign, based on a suggestion from Lori. Olly, Hector and Maronzio (freshly retrieved from the Trial Seekers) all help get the word out for George through their various social media outlets. In the end, the network says George cannot produce Valleys himself, as they still own the rights to it, but it doesn't matter. George is now blowing up and has become relevant again, as evidenced by Olly getting calls from Amazon, Hulu and even HBO. Elsewhere, Manolo passes his GED exam and is named class valedictorian, while George has to make a personal decision regarding Lori, who is moving to London to open a sister network there.

== Reception ==
On Rotten Tomatoes, season 1 of Lopez has an aggregate score of 73% based on 8 positive and 3 negative critic reviews. The website’s consensus reads: "Lopez's namesake star wrings enough cheeky, autobiographical humor to transcend the show's old-school premise."
