= Brian Drolet =

American actor, producer and writer

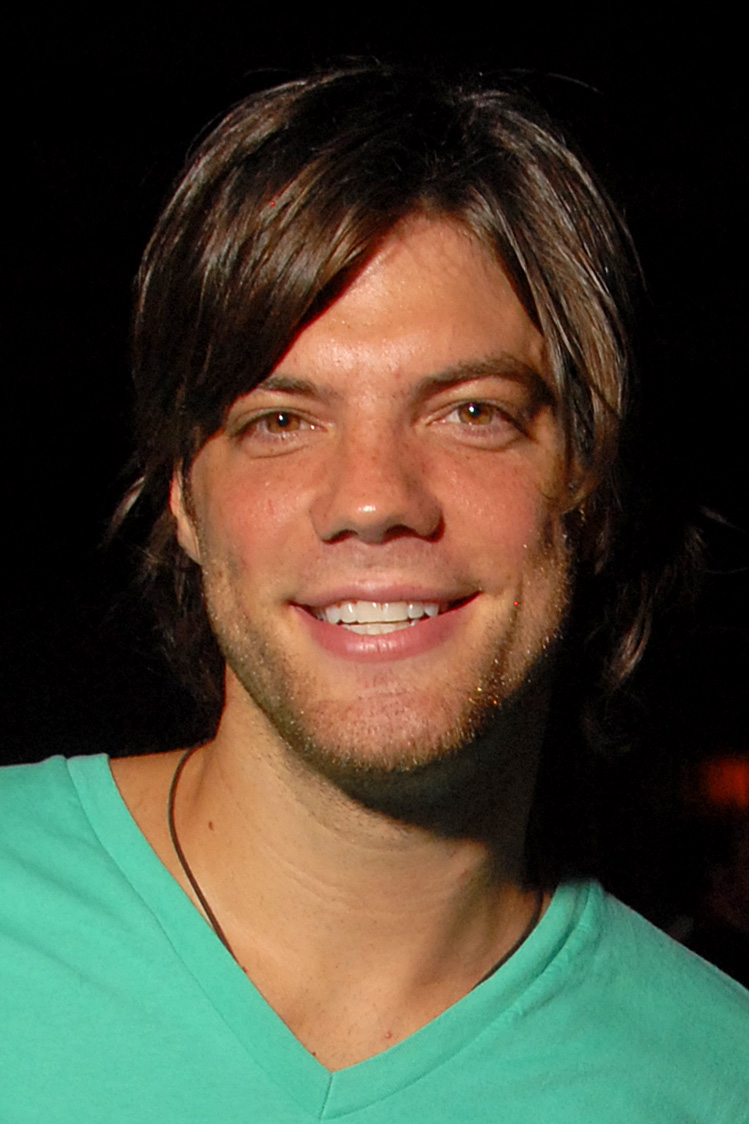
- Born: Brian Thomas Drolet; July 2, 1980 (age 46); Queens, New York City
- Occupations: Actor, producer, writer
- Years active: 2005–present

Brian Thomas Drolet (born July 2, 1980) is an American actor, producer and writer. He is best known for acting, producing and writing Dumbbells.

== Early life ==
Drolet was born and grew up in Queens, New York. He graduated from the University of Florida. He moved on from The University Of Florida's expressive arts school with a degree in Electronic Intermedia. Subsequent to graduating he moved back to NY, he began as a performing artist yet started to compose and create his own movies also. Brian cherishes all mediums of creative expression including painting and has even does a lot of stand-up comedy. While in Los Angeles, in addition to numerous film and TV jobs Brian additionally filled in as Head Writer for TruTVs portray comedy/theatrical presentation, "Six Degrees of Everything" delivered by Marc Summers Productions. He additionally featured in "Cinedopes", a scripted digital arrangement he made, delivered, and co-composed for YouTube with comedian Ben Gleib (Host of GSN's Idiotest) about the primary film theater to offer weed at its snack bars. Before that his film "Free weights", a comedy he co-composed, created, and featured in as Chris Long, a fallen b-ball star, was discharged dramatically in fifteen urban communities and VOD at the same time. On that motion picture he got the chance to work with comedy legend Carl Reiner, and in addition Tom Arnold, Jay Mohr, Mircea Monroe, the unparalleled Fabio, and Jaleel White. He delivered his first indie at age twenty-six, "2 Dudes And A Dream," where he worked with Jason Mewes, Andy Milonakis and Simon Rex and it was dispersed carefully by Warner Bros. and speaks to his invasion into creating and composing. Brian additionally featured in front of an audience in the honor winning play "Women Are Crazy Because Men Are Assholes" and additionally a progression of one-act plays called "Hollywood Shorts." He has likewise acted in a few TV and film jobs including Disney's Pair of Kings and in addition to different hidden camera tricks gaining experience in comedy on MTV's Damage Control to MTV's Disaster Date where his characters extended from a shabby male stripper to a hearing impaired wanna-be rapper. Brian likewise worked with Jonah Hill and Anthony Anderson on the Oxygen network indicate Campus Ladies and also Matt LeBlanc, Chevy Chase, and Ali Larter in the parody include "Lovesick" which opened up the 2014 Newport Beach Film Festival. Likewise on his resume are twelve or more non mainstream highlights where he worked with stars extending from Danny Trejo to Busy Philipps, and additionally the comedy pilots "Damaged Goods" and "Naked But Funny," a comedy pilot from New Wave Entertainment for Fox Broadcasting Company where he got the chance to play his idol from childhood Jim Carrey. Brian additionally was a cast individual from season one of MTV's raving success The Hills, performing stand-up comedy at the Laugh Factory in LA. Brian has likewise showed up in advertisements and plugs for Nike, Inc., White Castle, Sunkist, Miller Lite, Budweiser, Pepto-Bismol, the National Collegiate Athletic Association, Pepsi, Perry Ellis, Calvin Klein, and some more.

== Filmography ==
=== Films ===
Year	Title	Role	Notes
2005	The Iron Man	Transvestite	
2009	2 Dudes and a Dream	Thomas Price	
2009	American High School	Jonny Awesome	
2010	Shoot the Hero!	Hayek	
2011	Drain Baby	Carlton	
2011	Immortal Island	Locke	
2011	Action News 5	Guy	
2013	Slightly Single in L.A.	Nick	
2013	The Proposal	Remy	short
2014	Dumbbells	Chris Long	
2014	Lovesick	Josh	

=== Television ===
Year	Title	Role	Notes
2005	One Life to Live	Party Guy	1 Episode
2005	Damage Control		series regular
2006	Campus Ladies	College Student	1 Episode
2006	The Hills (TV Series)	himself	10 Episodes
2009	Disaster Date		20 Episodes
2010	Naked But Funny		TV movie
2011	I Made Out with Him Anyway	Cullen	
2011	Pair of Kings	Cave Dude	1 Episode
2014	20s vs. 30s	Kyle the Shots Guy	1 Episode
