= Sator (film) =

- Film poster
- Directed by: Jordan Graham
- Written by: Jordan Graham
- Produced by: Jordan Graham
- Starring: Michael Daniel; Rachel Johnson; Aurora Lowe; Gabriel Nicholson; June Peterson
- Cinematography: Jordan Graham
- Edited by: Jordan Graham
- Music by: Jordan Graham
- Production company: Mistik Jade Films
- Distributed by: 1091 Pictures
- Release dates: July 21, 2019 (Fantasia Film Festival); February 9, 2021 (United States)
- Country: United States
- Language: English

Sator is a 2019 American supernatural horror film written and directed by Jordan Graham and starring Michael Daniel, Rachel Johnson, Aurora Lowe, Gabriel Nicholson and June Peterson.

1091 Pictures announced that the film would be released digitally and on video on demand on February 9, 2021 (platforms included Amazon, iTunes/Apple TV, Google Play and Microsoft).

== Plot ==
Nani, who has dementia, believes a supernatural entity called Sator speaks to her and compels her to record its wisdom in automatic writing. Her daughter mysteriously vanishes on the day Nani's husband dies. Nani’s grandson Adam, who also admits to hearing voices, lives in his dead grandfather's isolated cabin and searches for Sator. By day he explores the surrounding woods with his dog, and at night he reviews footage from a deercam installed near the cabin. Adam's sister Deborah tries to manage the family's affairs from afar, while his brother Pete occasionally visits and reflects with the mostly silent Adam on their strange experiences.

Adam begins to hear noises in his cabin, and one night his dog runs out and disappears. Pete's friend Evie visits the cabin, bringing an old photo album that she found in Nani's house. As Evie talks, Adam looks through the album and sees a picture of his mother. He enters a fugue state where his mother, with a shaven head and dressed in fur and a deer skull, tells him that "what can't be seen in the darkness can be shown in the light." The next day, Pete visits and tells Adam that he thinks their grandfather, with Nani's help, sacrificed himself to allow their mother to be with Sator.

Continuing to look through the photo album, Adam remembers a birthday with his family where everyone avoided his mother because of her strange behavior. She too heard Sator and undertook automatic writing. His memories are interrupted by sounds in the woods. Investigating, he finds Evie tied to a tree. He frees her, and when she recognizes him, she is terrified. Adam feels compelled to choke her. Evie runs away but Adam sees her suddenly sucked into the sky.

Back in the cabin, reflecting on the vision of his mother, Adam lightens the deercam image and sees that figures in animal skins and skulls are standing in the darkness between trees. Several of these figures enter Adam’s cabin. He flees to a nearby cave and is compelled inside. He sees a figure in fur and bones that points at him.

Several months later, Pete has just been released from a mental institution. He is picked up by Deborah, and he expresses regret at Adam's isolation. Deborah reminds him that Adam needed to be isolated because "it wasn't exactly safe for him to be around us." Nevertheless, Pete revisits Adam at the cabin. He sits on a sofa, and suddenly sees Evie sitting in front of him. Adam appears from behind, stabs Pete in his throat, and burns his face in the fireplace. As the body burns, Adam levitates in the background.

That night at Nani's house, Deborah sees Nani laughing and talking with an unseen figure. Nani disappears and Deborah searches for her outside. There she suddenly encounters Adam, who has a shaved head. He chokes her unconscious, and Evie pours gasoline on Deborah. They burn her alive. Sator disciples gather around the fire.

Adam reenters the house, where he walks past a room where he sees his bald mother sitting silently with his dog. Adam joins Nani in a different room where she sits with another Sator disciple.

== Cast ==
- Michael Daniel as Pete
- Rachel Johnson as Evie
- Aurora Lowe as Deborah
- Gabriel Nicholson as Adam
- June Peterson as Nani

== Production ==
Principal photography took place in Santa Cruz, California, and Yosemite National Park. The film was in post-production for almost six years due to the solo work and budget limits of director Jordan Graham, who also built the cabin that was used in the film. June Peterson, who plays Nani in the film, is Graham's grandmother, and her belief in a supernatural being called Sator which watches over her formed the basis of the film's story.

== Reception ==
On review aggregator website Rotten Tomatoes, the film holds an approval rating of 88% based on 49 reviews, with an average rating of 7.2/10. The website's critics' consensus reads: "Supernatural horror of a refreshingly subtle vintage, Sator uses one family's fight against demonic possession to cast its own dark, stubborn spell." The film has an aggregated score of 82 out of 100 on Metacritic based on 8 reviews, indicating “universal acclaim”.

Leslie Felperin, writing for The Guardian, gave the film a score of 4 stars out of 5. In her review, she noted the film's similarities to other low-budget horror films such as The Blair Witch Project and The Witch, and wrote: "Mixing black and white, low-resolution footage with more colourful material creates a bricolage-like effect that keeps wrong-footing the viewer. Graham uses darkness and a very sparse score/soundscape to create a truly disturbing work that relies not so much on gore as the uncanny in its most potent form: stillness, pools of darkness and just-visible figures." Aya Stanley of The A.V. Club gave the film a grade of B+, writing: "Through both theme and texture, Graham approximates the slow phobia of Ari Aster's Hereditary—the pervasive feeling that the dominos are tumbling and there is nothing that can be done about it."

Writing for Variety, Dennis Harvey said: "this cryptic occult drama may be more impressive in its striking atmospherics than in its somewhat murky storytelling", adding: "This is the classic instance of a horror film that will please discerning viewers largely for what it doesn’t do, while more mainstream genre fans will chafe at the relative lack of gore, action and explication, complaining that "nothing happens."" He concluded: "You may not come out of Graham’s film with much definite sense of just what Sator is or wants (though the eventuality of some dead people has made it clear what it can do), but you emerge with the uncommon feeling of having dreamed someone else’s somber, unsettling dream."
