= Specimen (film) =

Canadian science fiction thriller television film

- Poster
- Written by: Sheldon Inkol; Lauren McLaughlin
- Story by: John Bradshaw; Damian Lee
- Directed by: John Bradshaw
- Starring: Mark-Paul Gosselaar
- Music by: Electronic Dream Factory
- Country of origin: Canada
- Original language: English

Production
- Executive producer: Jeff Sackman (uncredited)
- Producers: Damian Lee; Richard Babcock,
- Cinematography: Gerald R. Goozee
- Editor: Paul G. Day
- Running time: 85 minutes
- Production company: Combustion Film Productions

Original release
- Release: 1996

Specimen is a 1996 Canadian science-fiction thriller television film directed by John Bradshaw, based on a story by Bradshaw and producer Damian Lee. It stars Mark-Paul Gosselaar as a young man with superpowers, whose enigmatic past catches up with him just as he begins to investigate it.

== Plot ==
Eight-year-old Mike Hillary (Marc Donato) dreams of fire and a fire breaks out in his room. His mother (Carmelina Lamanna) perishes trying to save him. At the home of his grandparents (Dennis O'Connor and Jennifer Higgin), when his duvet begins to smoulder, he gets into a drawn bath to sleep.

Now 24, unemployed minor-league baseball player Mike Hillary (Mark-Paul Gosselaar) still sleeps in a drawn bath. After reading a short note from an old friend of his mother's, which says, "I believe you", he drives to her hometown to meet town sheriff Jimmy Masterson (David Nerman), who suggests considering the athletic counsellor job at the community centre. Mike asks why his mother left. Masterson says she was pregnant and unmarried, but says no more. Frustrated and angered, Mike leaves just as a fire starts in Masterson's trash can.

Mike starts working at the community centre. He notices children painting the number 11 surrounded by flames. Some "troubled" children respond to swimming, except James (Jared Durand), who fears the water. Mike seems to give the boy an emotional boost, to the delight of instructor Jessica Randall (Ingrid Kavelaars). Later, she catches up with him while jogging. They are accosted by her bully of an ex-boyfriend Blaine (Mark Lutz) and a fight ensues, Mike manifesting super strength and an unfocussed power of remote or tactile spontaneous combustion; objects ignite and Blaine suffers burns to his chest from Mike's pyrokinetic touch.

During a baseball game at the community centre, Mike has a vision of James being hurt and bullied by another boy, Bart (Kevin Zegers). Mike finds them and puts a stop to it. Meanwhile, at the sheriff's office, Blaine (his son) claims that Mike attacked him and has "superhuman powers." Masterson is skeptical — until Blaine shows him a hand-shaped burn on his chest. Later, Mike swims in the community centre's pool with Jessica, who notices the water getting warmer. Then, at her house apartment, he opens up a bit, they kiss, and another fire starts. Mike puts it out with his hands, which are not burned. Jessica now knows his secret. He warns her to keep away and runs off.

Meanwhile, on two successive nights, two powerful-looking men emerge from a lake — aliens in human camouflage biosuits - the bounty hunter Eleven (Doug O'Keeffe), and Sixty-six (Andrew Jackson).

Masterson pays a visit to Mike and reveals what he knows about Mike's mother; she believed that she had been impregnated by an alien and that she left town before Mike was born. Mike is appalled and angered, a lamp bursts into flames, and he orders Masterson to leave. That night, Blaine sneaks into Mike's vacated motel room and is apprehended by Eleven, who kills him once he learns of Mike's connection to Jessica.

The next day, Eleven goes to interrogate Jessica at the community centre, where James is intoning "Eleven" repeatedly, which Mike hears and then sees through extrasensory perception and precognitive visions. Jessica runs from Eleven when his interrogation of her turns aggressive. He corners her with a wall of fire. Mike arrives, calling for her, and sees her helpless in the pool and jumps in, only to be ambushed by Eleven, who tries to drown him. Suddenly, Sixty-six intervenes to save Mike. He tells Eleven he is in charge and subdues him with a burst of flames.

Mike awakens in a car being driven by Sixty-six, who explains that experiments on humans and other terrestrial life have gone on for thousands of years, his mother was one, and that to them Mike is a mere "viable specimen", but he refuses to allow anything to happen to Mike — his son. Mike becomes upset and the car ignites. He runs into the woods. Eleven catches up to Sixty-six and they fight a fiery duel to the death. Eleven wins, but Mike returns and challenges him. Holding nothing back, Mike's powers prove greater than Eleven's, destroying him utterly. Sixty-six, wounded and dying from exposure to Earth's atmosphere, leaves Mike's questions about himself or others like him unanswered. Mike sets his body adrift and ignites it.

Mike and Jessica leave town together, despite his misgivings about hurting her. She says they can "take precautions" and produces a fire extinguisher. Back at the community centre, Bart bullies James again, and discovers a fire in his hall locker.

== Cast ==
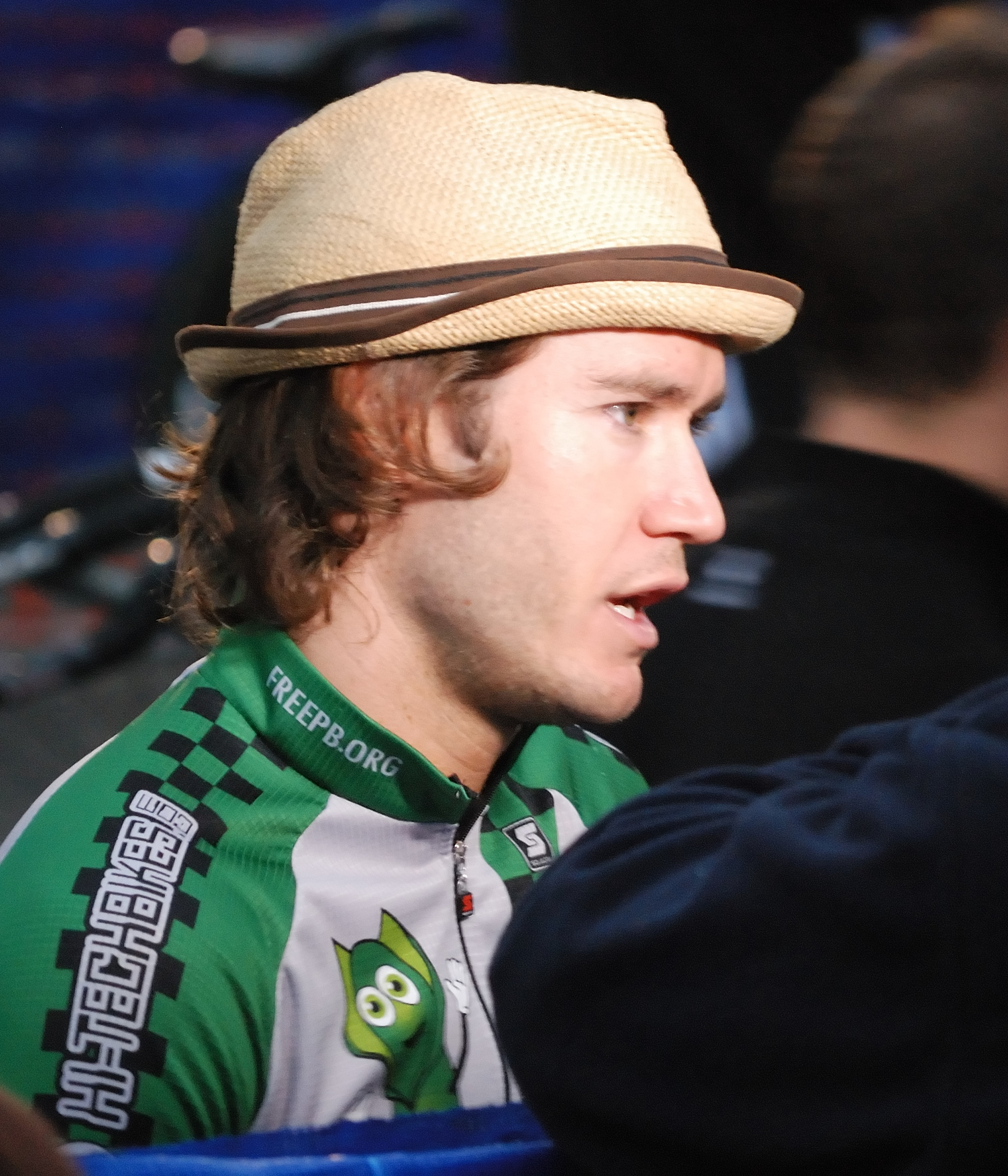
Mark-Paul Gosselaar in 2008

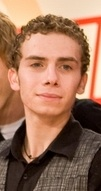
Specimen was one of Marc Donato's earliest roles.

Main

- Mark Paul Gosselaar • Mike Hillary
- Doug O'Keeffe • Eleven
- Ingrid Kavelaars • Jessica Randall
- David Nerman • Sheriff Jimmy Masterson
- Andrew Jackson • Sixty-Six
- Michelle Johnson • Sarah

Supporting

- Marc Donato • Mike Hillary (Age 8)
- Carmelina Lamanna • Carol Hillary
- Mark Lutz • Blaine
- Grant Nickalls • Scott
- Bryan J. Thomas • Manny
- Jared Durand • James
- Robert Weiss • Deputy Larson
- Dennis O'Connor • Grandpa Vern
- Jennifer Higgin • Grandma June
- Kevin Zegers • Bart
- Peter Graham • Desk Clerk
- Tim MacMenamin • Firefighter
- Branko Racki • Firefighter (as Bronco Racki)
- John Stoneham Jr. • Guy in Truck
- L.J. Maxwell • Wristband Voice

Notes
John Stoneham, Jr., was also the stunt coordinator on the film, and performed stunts along with Thomas and Racki.

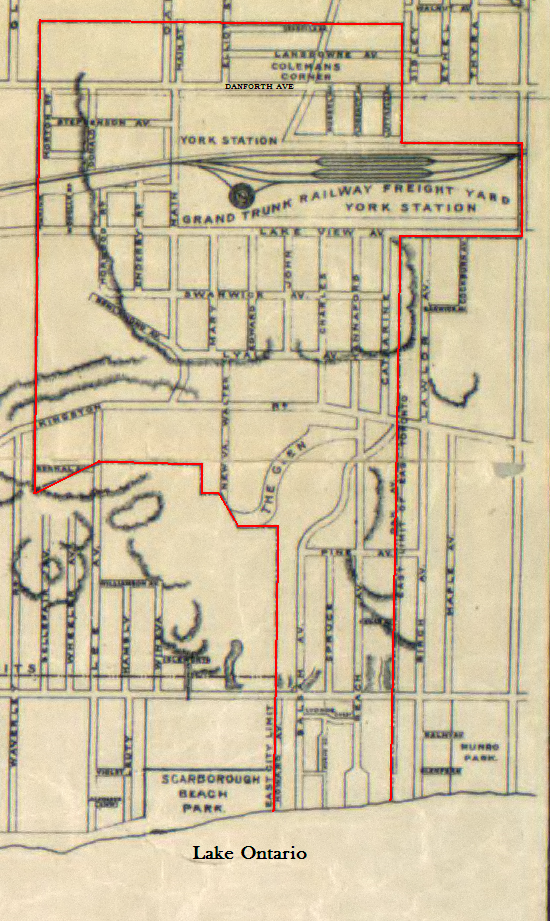
Map of East Toronto

== Influences and genre ==
Both a critic at TV Guide and reviewer Felix Vasquez Jr. assert that Specimen borrows heavily from the first two Terminator films (1984 and 1991), with Vasquez adding Firestarter (1984) and Fire in the Sky (1993).

Vasquez characterizes the television film as a science-fiction melodrama.

== Production ==
=== Background ===
Director John Bradshaw is known for having made a number of low-budget thrillers for television, including Specimen.

=== Filming ===
Though the story's action is mostly set in the fictional American town of Eastfield, principal photography took place in Toronto, 2–23 October 1995. Shooting locations include Centre 55 (corner of Main and Swanwick), a former East Toronto police station built in the 1900s, which served as the Eastfield police station.

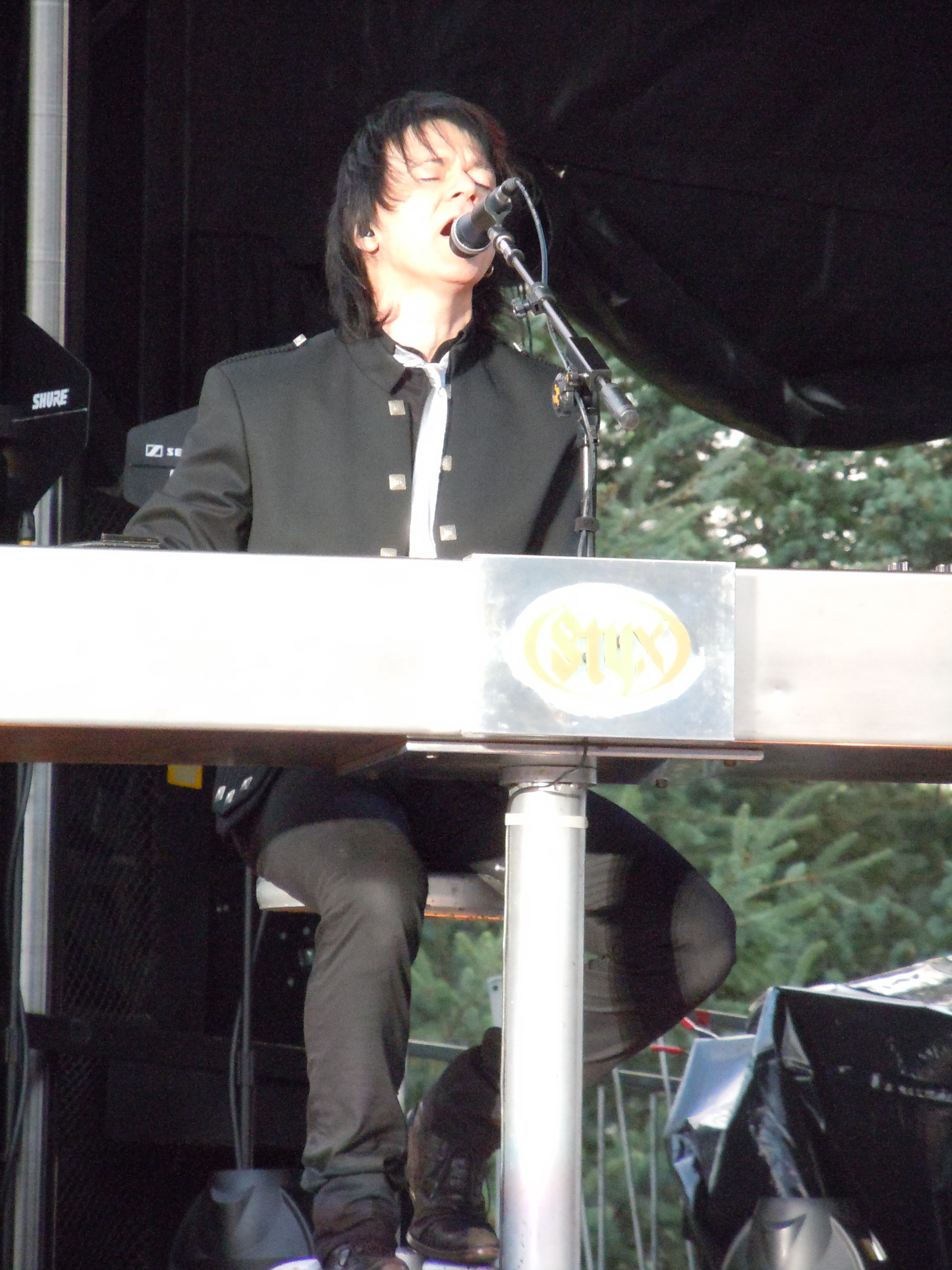
Singles by Gowan are included on the soundtrack.

=== Music ===
Besides the incidental music provided by the Electronic Dream Factory, the song that plays during the opening and end credits is Lawrence Gowan's "Holding This Rage", the final track on his 1990 studio album Lost Brotherhood. Other songs from the same album on the film soundtrack include "Lost Brotherhood" and "Love Makes You Believe", the second song that plays during the end credits.

== Release and reception ==
Specimen was broadcast on television for the first time in 1996.

=== Home media and streaming ===
Specimen was released on VHS in 1997 by A-PIX Entertainment, and on DVD (Ardustry Home Entertainment) in 1999 by a newly formed Canadian film production and distribution company, Trimuse Entertainment, and again in 2003.

Specimen is available from the Canadian Hollywood Suite video-on-demand service and Amazon Prime.

=== Critical response ===
TV Guide's critic describes Specimen as "an adequate sci-fi thriller with a serviceable plot," and a "model of low-budget film production," which makes "good use" of its small-town locations, "doesn't ask its cast to do more than they are capable of," and moves "at a sure clip." However, the film fails to fulfill its potential:

Given the limitless range of powers a writer could give to alien beings, one is rather disappointed that the four scribes ... couldn't come up with anything more intriguing for these beings than the ability to create fire at will. By the end of this feature, the viewer may feel like he or she has spent the last hour and a half staring into a roaring campfire. One can't fault the producers of this film for taking advantage of a story with which the public seems to have an endless fascination, though one could have hoped they might do something more interesting with it.

It's a cheesy knock off and one that prides itself in being a shameless carbon copy, but I love it just the same at the end of the day.

— Felix Vasquez Jr.

Felix Vasquez agrees that the film's premise "has potential to be something bigger than its low-budget trappings allow," and that the film is "ridiculous and rather goofy." However, he also finds the television movie "charming and entertaining" with "some decent performances," adding that in spite of its flaws, Specimen is a "fine form of guilty pleasure that works around the low budget and hammy acting and taps in to the epic angle that it projects on to the audience."

== Adaptation ==
Felix Vasquez, who is also a comic book author-artist, saw Specimen for the first time on video in 1999 and liked it so much he made a comic book of the film.
