= Matthew Posey =

American actor and director (1958–2026)

- Born: July 31, 1958; Houston, Texas, U.S.
- Died: October 2, 2026 (aged 68)
- Occupations: Actor; director

Matthew Posey (July 31, 1958 – October 2, 2026) was an American actor and director. He was the founder of the Ochre House Theater. He appeared in Places in the Heart, The Final, and The Magnificent Seven.

In late January 2017, after leaving a Dallas bar, Posey was attacked in a random act of violence and shot in the face. He returned to acting five weeks after the shooting.

Posey died October 2, 2026, at the age of 68.

== Filmography ==
=== Film ===
Year	Title	Role
1984	Places in the Heart	Eugene
1986	True Stories	The Computer Guy
1989	Night Game	Donnie (as Matt Posey)
1990	Big Bad John	Male Cashier (as Matt Posey)
1990	I Come in Peace	Psycho #1
1991	Ninth Life	Sam
2001	Pendulum	Frank
2003	The Life of David Gale	Inmate Cook
2007	No Country for Old Men	Sporting Goods Clerk
2007	Mr. Brooks	AA Leader
2007	Living & Dying	Captain Burleson
2007	Walking Tall: The Payback	Otis
2010	The Final	Parker
2010	Balls Out: Gary the Tennis Coach	Male Parent 2 at Sports Meeting
2011	Seeking Justice	Rabbit
2011	Language of a Broken Heart	Donovan
2012	Abel's Field	Officer Paulson
2013	Cry	Mr. Gleason
2016	The Magnificent Seven	Hank Stoner
2018	Mind of Its Own	Therapist
2019	This World Won't Break	Lonnie Milligan
2025	El Tonto Por Cristo	Father John
2027	Verano	Nelson

=== Television ===
Year	Title	Role
1984	With Intent to Kill	Larry Rigoli
1988	It Takes Two	Hotel Clerk
1989	Lonesome Dove	Jim #1
1989	The Fulfillment of Mary Gray	Mike Duzak
1991	Final Verdict	Mootry
1991	Finding the Way Home	Inspector
1991	In Broad Daylight	Mayor Dan Austin
1991	Ninth Life	Sam Webster
1991	A Killing in a Small Town	Norman Billings
1992	Sinatra	Harry James
1992	Afterburn	Stanley
1992	Cruel Doubt	Keith Mason
1992	Stay the Night	D.A. Tom Charron
1993	Victim of Love: The Shannon Mohr Story	—
1993	L.A. Law	Dr. Scott Anson
1993	In the Heat of the Night	Bernard "Monk" Stiles
1994	The Corpse Had a Familiar Face	Sam
1995	Kansas	Vernon
1995	Deadline for Murder: From the Files of Edna Buchanan	Sam
1995	Death in Small Doses	Guthrie
1997	Sleeping with the Devil	—
2000	Walker, Texas Ranger	Smokey Cole / Ron Mott
2010	Chase	Man in Motel
2010	The Good Guys	Bartender
2010	Temple Grandin	Ted Gilbert
2011	In Plain Sight	Saken
2012–2013	Dallas	Head Driller / Foreman / Brian Davis
2013	Necessary Roughness	Doug the Club Owner
2014	Rectify	Charlie the Chaplain
2016	American Crime	Nate
2017	The Son	Tom Sullivan
2023	Love & Death	Bob Pomeroy
2026	Brothers	Bartender
