= Brutal Season =

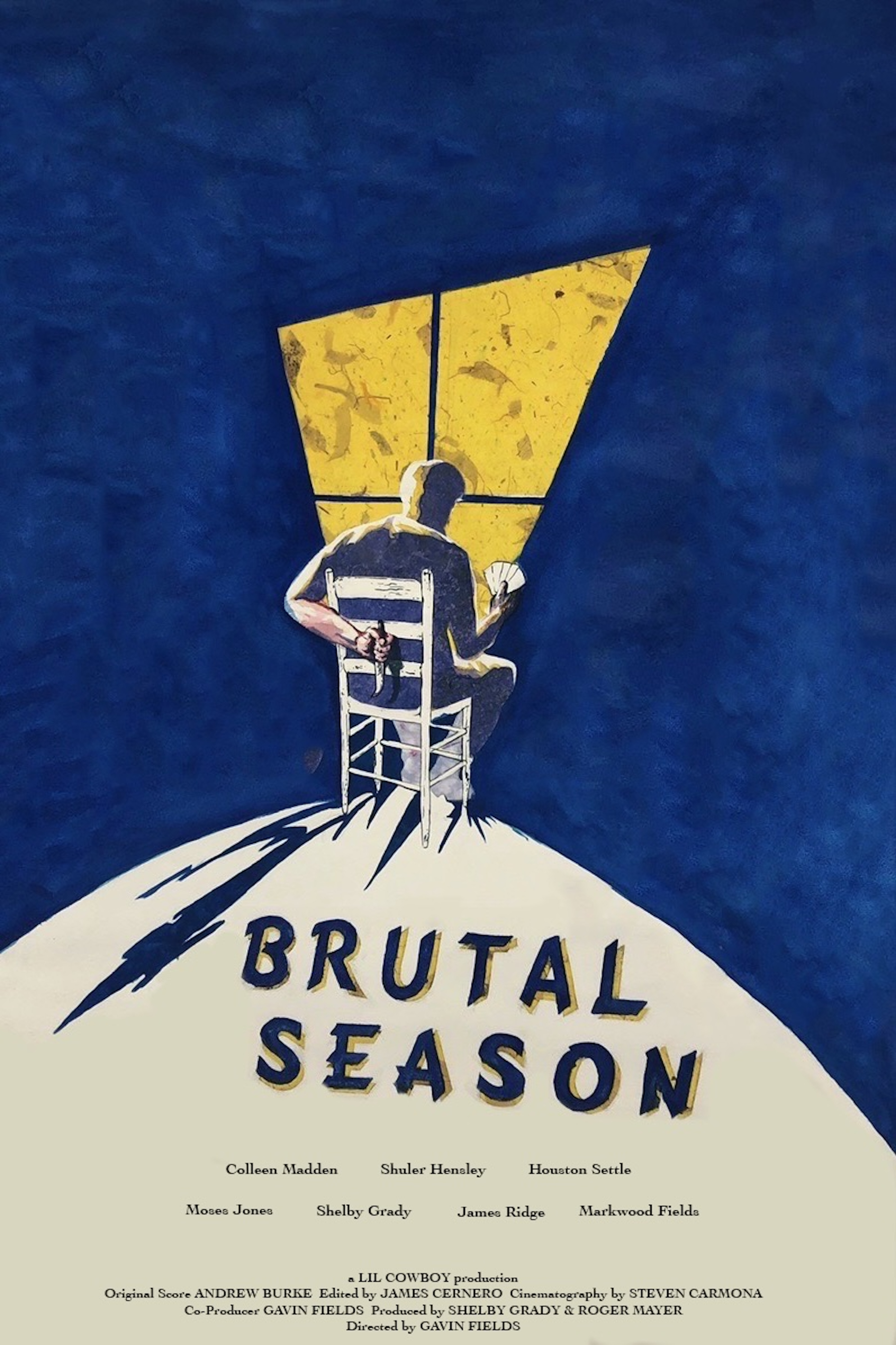
- Theatrical Release Poster
- Directed by: Gavin Fields
- Written by: Gavin Fields
- Produced by: Shelby Grady; Roger M. Mayer; Gavin Fields
- Starring: Colleen Madden; James Ridge; Markwood Fields; Shelby Grady; Houston Settle; Moses Jones; Shuler Hensley
- Cinematography: Steven Carmona
- Edited by: James T. Cernero
- Music by: Andrew Burke
- Production company: Lil Cowboy Films
- Distributed by: 1091 Pictures
- Release dates: September 22, 2022 (Fantastic Fest); October 10, 2023 (United States)
- Running time: 101 minutes
- Country: United States
- Budget: $130,000 est.

Brutal Season is a 2022 independent neo-noir film written and directed by Gavin Fields. Its ensemble cast stars Colleen Madden, Houston Settle, Markwood Fields, Shelby Grady, James Ridge, and Shuler Hensley. It was produced by Shelby Grady, Roger Mayer and Gavin Fields with original music by Andrew Burke and cinematography by Steven Carmona.

Set in 1948 Red Hook, Brooklyn, its plot follows the Trouths, a family with little income, few prospects and the hottest summer on record. When their estranged son returns after an absence of many years, the family's fragile dynamic begins to collapse. A sudden death, the promise of a life insurance payout, and the resulting fallout cause each family member to explore their own truth. It is the feature film directorial debut of Gavin Fields.

The film finds its footing in classic American Theater with the entire story taking place in the Trouth's cramped apartment. It can be compared to other classic American movies like Alfred Hitchcock's, Rope (1948) and Elia Kazan's, On The Waterfront (1954).

== Plot ==
In the summer of 1948, the Trouths are down on their luck. Gayle and Louis are joined in the family's kitchen by their son, Charlie, and soon after their daughter, Marianne. The family discusses Louis' struggles to get a job and Marianne's new boyfriend, a doctor.

Louis leaves to look for work, and Charlie departs for an afternoon movie. Soon after, Gayle and Marianne are shocked by an unexpected visitor - the Trouth's oldest son, Junior. Gayle is beside herself and reveals Junior has been gone without contacting the family for twelve years. As they catch up, Charlie returns, having forgotten his wallet. He is thrilled by his brother's return to Brooklyn and hopes he'll stay.

Gayle decides to make a celebratory dinner and departs to shop with Marianne. Junior asks Charlie about their grandparents, wondering if they left the family any money when they died. Charlie tells him they did not, but shows him an old war knife their grandfather bequeathed him. In this conversation it is revealed Charlie suffered a childhood accident that keeps him from working. Louis returns, seeming shocked and uncomfortable about his son's arrival. The family decides to go out to eat, as Gayle forgot an ingredient while shopping. Junior pockets the knife Charlie showed him.

Upon returning from dinner, Charlie and Junior play cards and convince Gayle and Marianne to join. Junior encourages his mother to cheat, causing her to win the game. After the women have gone to bed, Louis and Junior debate whether Louis is a changed man now that he is sober and no longer gambles. This escalates into an argument, during which Junior reveals he suffered abuse throughout his childhood at the hands of his drunk father. The altercation causes Louis to collapse, coughing, and he flees the apartment.

The next morning, the police arrive as the family is waking up and explain Louis was murdered the previous night. The siblings are shocked; Gayle faints from distress upon their departure.

Several days later, the family returns to the apartment after Louis' funeral. Marianne's boyfriend, Ivan, accompanies them. When he leaves, Junior and Marianne have an argument about her being seen with him, as he is black. Gayle takes Junior's side and agrees Marianne should meet Ivan elsewhere.

A knock at the door reveals Randy Hawkes, an insurance adjuster. He explains Louis took out a significant life insurance policy shortly before his death. The family is shocked when Randy also reveals Louis had been battling stomach cancer, and tells them he must interview each member of the family to ensure Louis' death was accidental rather than a suicide.

Randy speaks with each family member alone as he tries to determine Louis' cause of death. He learns information about Louis and the night he died from each: Gayle discusses the nature of his relationships with his children, Randy tells Charlie his knife was found at the scene of the murder, and Marianne discloses she heard Louis and Junior arguing the night of his death. She also informs Randy that Junior was the last person to see Louis alive.

When Randy interviews Junior, it is clear he is suspicious. Randy questions Junior about his mysterious return home, his father's morals, and Junior's character. The mounting pressure causes Junior to tell him Louis committed suicide to ensure his family's financial stability. Randy refunds the cost of the original policy, which Junior pockets before fleeing the apartment.

Years later, Gayle once again gazes out her kitchen window. Marianne and Ivan, now married, are collecting the remainder of her belongings and saying goodbye. Charlie enters the apartment, intoxicated after a day of gambling, and muses to his mother that they'll always have each other.

== Cast ==
- Colleen Madden as Gayle Trouth
- Houston Settle as Junior Trouth
- Markwood Fields as Charlie Trouth
- Shelby Grady as Marianne Trouth
- James Ridge as Louis Trouth
- Shuler Hensley as Randy Hawkes
- Moses Jones as Ivan Barnett

== Production ==
=== Development ===
Fields completed the script for Brutal Season in January 2020 after writing a collection of features throughout 2015–2019. In considering which project to develop as his directorial debut, Brutal Season initially rose to the top of the list due to its singular location and the potential to complete the film with a "limited budget". Development began in March 2020 upon the advent of the COVID-19 pandemic. Producer Shelby Grady and Fields moved forward with the project knowing it was, in essence, a chamber play filmed on a singular set and utilizing a small cast and crew. Covid protocol restrictions and a limited budget were driving forces in the development of the film. Fields and Grady aimed to use their limited budget as a creative challenge and sought to mirror a theater-going experience on screen.

=== Filming ===
From build to wrap, the film was shot in 21 days in December 2020 on a sound stage in Chattanooga, TN.

== Release ==
It made its worldwide debut at Fantastic Fest as part of the inaugural Burnt Ends line up in September 2022. The film was awarded "Best Acting Ensemble" at the Phoenix Film Festival in March, 2023. Additional screenings included the Fargo Film Festival, the Chattanooga Film Festival, and NewFilmmakers LA where it where it made its west coast premiere, was the selected feature and concluded the festival's May InFocus programming.

It was picked up for US distribution by 1091 Pictures and was released on streaming platforms on October 10, 2023.

== Reception ==
Film Threat Critic Calan Panchoo gave the film a 9/10 score and said, "All of these aspects — the cinematography, the characters, the aesthetics — build toward even greater praise: It is an altogether riveting experience. The drama is like a scandalously kindled fire that burns proactively till its end. All told this is a deeply considered, maturely shot, and charismatically told story."

Critic Liam Gaughan of Collider recommended the film, writing, "The sign of a great filmmaker is someone who can make the most out of a confined environment, and director Gavin Fields certainly proved that he's one to watch with his first feature-length film, Brutal Season."

Kyle Logan of Screen Anarchy wrote,"It's an impressive magic trick to make theater cinematic in any context, whether it's a filming of a play or a cinematic adaptation of a work intended for theater. But Brutal Season is not an adaptation, it's an original work that's highly invested in the ways theater and cinema can be melded to create something excitingly new, rather than forcing one art form to meet the confines and demands of another."

== Soundtrack ==
Musical score was written and produced by Andrew Burke and was his first for a feature film.

The movie also features the song "I'll Get By" with music by Fred Ahlert, and lyrics by Roy Turk published in 1928.
