= Adam Rose (actor) =

Israeli-American actor (born 1987)

- אדם רוז
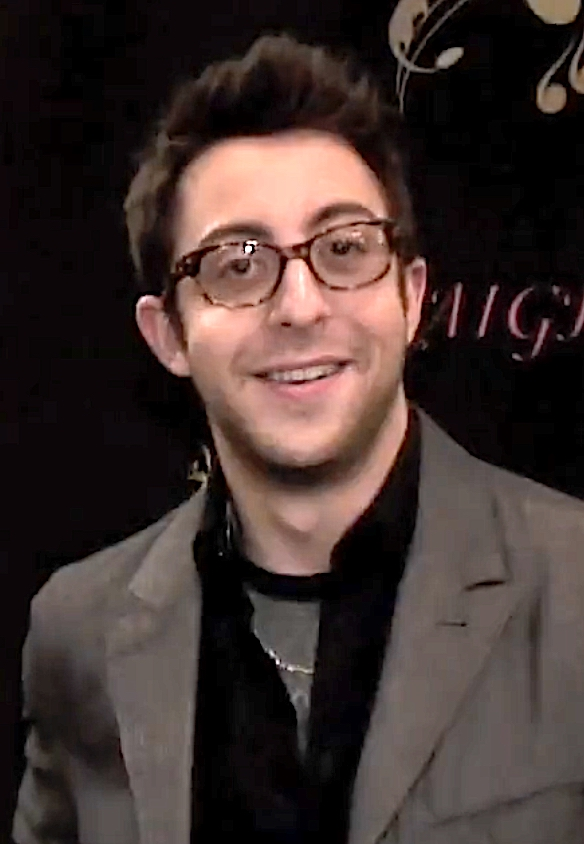
- Rose in 2010
- Born: July 24, 1987 (age 39); Jerusalem, Israel
- Education: Fiorello H. LaGuardia High School
- Occupations: Actor; content creator
- Years active: 1997–present
- Known for: Mashing Strawberries & Instagram Advertisement
- Notable credits: Deconstructing Harry; LA's Finest; Merry Happy Whatever; Veronica Mars
- Spouse: Joanna Kabbara (m. 2018; div. 2025)
- Children: 1

Instagram information
- Page: Adam Rose
- Followers: 8.4M (March 2026)

TikTok information
- Page: Adam Rose
- Followers: 6.8M (December 2025)

YouTube information
- Channel: Adam Rose
- Subscribers: 6.21M (February 2026)

Adam Rose (Hebrew: אדם רוז; born July 24, 1987) is an Israeli-American actor and content creator. Rose appeared in the television shows PB&J Otter (1998–2000), Veronica Mars (2006–2019), Aliens in America (2007–2008), Merry Happy Whatever (2019), L.A.'s Finest (2020) and Supernatural (2013), and the films Deconstructing Harry (1997), Margaret (2011), Literally, Right Before Aaron (2017), and 1 Night in San Diego (2020).

== Early life, family and education ==
Rose was born on July 24, 1987, in Jerusalem, Israel. He was raised in New York City, attending Fiorello H. LaGuardia High School.

== Career ==
=== Film ===
On his casting for Perfect Wedding Days, filmmaker Gary Sinyor compared Rose to Rowan Atkinson and Peter Sellers.

In 2025, it was announced that Rose would make his feature film debut in 15 Minutes produced by Ambitious Entertainment and HKCorp. He is represented by Brillstein Entertainment Partners and CAA.

=== Social media ===
Rose started creating videos on TikTok where he claims he made up to 100 videos before one of them went viral. He learned how to get through a social media growth plateau after visiting Internet personality Zach King. Rose wears a blue cardigan in his videos, which was a random choice he stuck with and has become known for.

Upon the launch of Threads in 2023, Rose promoted Futurama as a Hulu partner, and claimed it to be the first ad on the platform.

In 2025 and early 2026, Rose became an Internet meme as a reaction image from a short-form video advertisement for Instagram that got popular for having a reaction face that was unusual and looked like an expression of shock while looking at a picture of a food recipe regarding PB&J.

== Personal life ==
Rose married Joanna Kabbara in 2018. They have one child.

== Filmography ==
Year	Title	Role	Notes
1997	Deconstructing Harry	Mel's Son	
1998–2000	PB&J Otter	Peanut Otter	65 episodes
2003	The Hebrew Hammer	Addict Jewish Child	
2004	The Sopranos	Todd	Episode: "All Happy Families..."
2005	The Squid and the Whale	Otto	
2006–2019	Veronica Mars	Max	7 episodes
2007–2008	Aliens in America	Dooley	11 episodes
2009	Up in the Air	Makeout Dave	
2010	The Bounty Hunter	Jimmy	
2010	The Back-up Plan	Louie	
2010	Weeds	Joe Knock	2 episodes
2011	Margaret	Anthony	
2012	Literally, Right Before Aaron	Adam	Short film by Ryan Eggold
2013	Suits	Omar	Episode: "The Other Time"
2013–2016	Supernatural	Aaron Bass	2 episodes
2014	NCIS: New Orleans	Jesse Neville	Episode: "Master of Horror"
2015	Emily & Tim	Jon Posnick	Segment "Attraction"
2017	Literally, Right Before Aaron	Alan (Co-Worker)	
2017–2018	Santa Clarita Diet	Orderly / Barton	2 episodes
2018	Modern Family	Adam	Episode: "Clash of Swords"
2019	Merry Happy Whatever	Todd	8 episodes
2020	Carol's Second Act	Jake	4 episodes
2020	L.A.'s Finest	Nathan Baker	6 episodes
2020	1 Night in San Diego	Kevin	
2022	New Amsterdam	Chad Barton	2 episodes
2022–2025	Hamster & Gretel	The Earworm / Additional Voices	3 episodes
2025	My Weird School	Mr. Small	Television Film
2026	Behemoth!		Post-production
2026	Fall 2: Deadpoint	Blue Cardigan Guy	
TBA	Perfect Wedding Days		by Gary Sinyor featuring David Berry
TBA	Goodbye Girl		Filming

== Stage credits ==
Year	Title	Role	Location	Notes
1997	Baby Anger	Eric	Wilder Theater, New York	Featuring John Pankow and Kristen Johnson
2001	The Gathering	Michael	Wadsworth Theatre, Los Angeles	By Arje Shaw, featuring Hal Linden and Deirdre Lovejoy
2001	An Immaculate Misconception	Adam	Primary Stages, New York	Featuring Ann Dowd
2005	Dead End	Angel	Ahmanson Theatre, Los Angeles	Featuring Tom Everett Scott, Kathryn Hahn, and Ryan Eggold
