= Skye McCole Bartusiak =

American actress (1992–2014)

- Born: September 28, 1992; Houston, Texas, U.S.
- Died: July 19, 2014 (aged 21); Houston, Texas, U.S.
- Occupation: Actress
- Years active: 1999–2012
- Website: www.skyemccolebartusiak.com

Skye McCole Bartusiak (September 28, 1992 – July 19, 2014) was an American child actress and child model. She appeared in The Patriot (2000), Don't Say a Word (2001), as Rose Wilder in Beyond the Prairie: The True Story of Laura Ingalls Wilder (2002), as Megan Matheson on season 2 of 24 (2002–03), Boogeyman (2005), and Kill Your Darlings (2006).

== Early life ==
Skye McCole Bartusiak was born on September 28, 1992, in Houston, Texas, to parents Helen (née McCole, actress, director and producer; 1956–2015) and Donald Bartusiak. Her brother, Stephen Dylan (1985–2023), was also a child model.

She attended St. Thomas the Apostle Episcopal School and Lutheran South Academy in Houston, and she graduated from Laurel Springs School in Ojai, California, in 2010.

== Career ==
Bartusiak first starred in Stephen King's Storm of the Century as young Pippa Hatcher. In 2000, she appeared in The Patriot as the youngest child of a militia leader portrayed by Mel Gibson. She played the young Marilyn Monroe in the TV miniseries Blonde and the psychiatrist's daughter in Don't Say a Word, both in 2001. She also played young Charlie McGee in Firestarter: Rekindled and Megan Matheson during season two of the television series 24 (2002–2003).

Bartusiak made an appearance in the short film The Vest in 2003 and played the part of The Girl in Once Not Far from Home in 2005. She also tried her hand at theater, playing in The Miracle Worker with Hilary Swank at the Charlotte Repertory Theatre in North Carolina.

In 2003, Bartusiak returned to period drama with Love Comes Softly, and a year later, she played young Jackie in Against the Ropes with Meg Ryan. In 2005, she received main billing for her role as Franny Roberts in the hit horror film Boogeyman. She starred in the "Kids" episode (season 1, ep. 19) of hospital drama series House, and took a lead role as Sunshine in the 2006 film Kill Your Darlings, playing a troubled teen willing to do anything to get the attention of her busy father.

== Death ==
On July 19, 2014, Bartusiak died at the age of 21 in her apartment behind her parents' Houston home. Bartusiak's mother, Helen, later reported that she was healthy and did not abuse substances but had recently been experiencing epileptic seizures, which she believed had likely played a role in her daughter's death. That October, however, Bartusiak's primary cause of death was ruled as an accidental drug overdose of hydrocodone and carisoprodol combined with Difluoroethane inhalation.

A memorial service was held in Houston six days later; her brother Stephen told mourners: "If you want to know what makes Skye happy, go out and plant a tree."

== Filmography ==
=== Film ===
Year	Title	Role	Notes
1999	The Cider House Rules	Hazel	
2000	The Prophet's Game	Adele Highsmith (child)	
2000	The Patriot	Susan Martin	
2001	Don't Say a Word	Jessie Conrad	
2001	Riding in Cars with Boys	Amelia, age 8	
2001	The Affair of the Necklace	Dove	Scenes deleted
2002	Flashpoint	Lizzie	
2003	Love Comes Softly	Missie Davis	
2003	The Vest	Sara	Short film
2004	Against the Ropes	Little Jackie Kallen	
2005	Boogeyman	Franny Roberts	
2006	Kill Your Darlings	Sunshine	
2006	Once Not Far from Home	The Little Girl	Short film
2006	Razor Sharp	Isis/Ice-6	Short film
2008	A Fix	Natalie Coleman	Short film
2008	Pineapple	Alex	
2009	Wild About Harry	Daisy Goodhart	
2011	Good Day for It	Rachel	
2011	University of Penn Relay Carnival	—N/a	Director
2012	Twelve Hungry Men	Jesse	Short film
2012	Dr. Oscar Griffith: Hollywood Psychiatrist	The Pop Star / Rachel	Short film
2012	Sick Boy	Lucy	

=== Television ===
Year	Title	Role	Notes
1999	Storm of the Century	Pippa Hatcher	2 episodes
1999	JAG	Rachel Sherkston	Episode: "Shakedown"
1999	Judging Amy	Marcy Noble	Episode: "Presumed Innocent"
1999	Witness Protection	Suzie Batton	HBO movie
2000	Providence	Jessie	Episode: "Taking a Chance on Love"
2000	Frasier	Girl with Drawing	Episode: "The Three Faces of Frasier"
2000	Law & Order: Special Victims Unit	Jennifer	Episode: "Legacy"
2000	The Darkling	Casey Obold	TV film
2001	Touched by an Angel	Sarah	Episode: "The Birthday Present"
2001	Blonde	Young Norma Jeane Baker	TV film
2002	Firestarter: Rekindled	Young Charlie McGee	TV film
2002	Beyond the Prairie: The True Story of Laura Ingalls Wilder	Rose Wilder	TV film
2002–03	24	Megan Matheson	Recurring role (season 2)
2003	Love Comes Softly	Missie Davis	TV film
2004	George Lopez	L'il Bit	2 episodes
2005	House	Mary Carroll	Episode: "Kids"
2005	Lost	Young Kate Austen (voice)	Episode: "Born to Run"; uncredited
2005	CSI: Crime Scene Investigation	Susan Lester	Episode: "Bite Me"
2007	Close to Home	Amber	Episode: "Fall from Grace"
