= The Ringmaster (film) =

2019 documentary film

- Directed by: Molly Dworsky and Dave Newberg
- Written by: Zachary Capp; Molly Dworsky; Julian Edward Williams; Dave Newberg
- Produced by: Zachary Capp; Joshua Capp; Daniel Capp; Dave Newberg; Molly Dworsky; Sean Brogan; Julian Edward Williams; Pete Berg; Drew Johnson; Dave Reynolds
- Cinematography: Mike Lurie and Pete Berg
- Edited by: Dave Newberg
- Production companies: Capp Bros Productions; Asteroid and Space Metals Recovery
- Distributed by: 1091 Pictures
- Release dates: August 2019 (Festival of Cinema NYC); October 6, 2020
- Running time: 88 minutes
- Country: United States
- Language: English

The Ringmaster is a 2019 American documentary film starring Zachary Capp and Larry Lang. The documentary was directed by Molly Dworsky and Dave Newberg and is a Capp Bros Production in association with Asteroid and Space Metals Recovery.

The film premiered at the 2019 Festival of Cinema NYC and released digitally and on demand on October 6, 2020 through 1091 Pictures.

== Plot ==
An aging chef from Minnesota has his life turned upside down when a relentless filmmaker from Las Vegas tries to make the chef's onion rings world famous.

== Featured people ==
- Zachary Capp
- Larry Lang
- Linda Lang
- Tom Sietsema
- Gene Simmons
- Paul Stanley
- Chuck Brennan
- Lexy Lionel
- Tommy Thayer
- Eric Singer
- Darren Selberg
- Karl Sensenbaugh
- Jason Knauss
- Mark Davis
- Freddie Glusman
- Evan Glusman
- Felicity Cunningham
- Andrew Molasky
- Dave Newberg
- Molly Dworsky
- Mike Lurie
- Sean Brogan
- Julian Edward Williams
- Pete Berg

== Reception ==
The film premiered at the Festival of Cinema NYC in August 2019 and took home the Best Feature Documentary prize. It then went on to win the Best Screenwriting Award at Doc LA - Los Angeles Documentary Film Festival and concluded its festival run at the DOC EDGE Festival in New Zealand.
