= 1091 Pictures =

American independent film production and distribution company (2015–2024)

- Type: Subsidiary
- Industry: Film
- Founded: 2015; 11 years ago
- Founder: The Orchard (Sony Music Entertainment)
- Defunct: July 10, 2024; 2 years ago
- Fate: Chapter 7 bankruptcy liquidation by parent company
- Successor: The Orchard (Sony Music Entertainment), library sold to Magnolia Pictures
- Headquarters: New York City, New York
- Area served: Worldwide
- Parent: The Orchard (2015–2019); Chicken Soup for the Soul Entertainment (2021–2024)
- Website: 1091pictures.com

1091 Pictures was an American production company based in New York City and Los Angeles. The company was founded as the film and television division subsidiary of The Orchard in 2015. The company is best known for the Oscar-nominated films Life, Animated and Cartel Land. Sony divested the company and its catalogue of over 4,000 in 2019, with the company adopting the name 1091 Media. In 2020, the company rebranded as 1091 Pictures and announced that its parent company rebranded as Streamwise, the name of its new technology platform in development. December of 2023, multiple filmmakers took legal action against 1091 Pictures for failing to make payments of revenue sharing from distribution deals the company had contracted with. In July 2024, parent company Chicken Soup for the Soul Entertainment was placed in Chapter 7 liquidation, which would signal a liquidation of the company's assets, and the cessation of its subsidiaries, including 1091 Pictures.

== History ==
The company was founded in 2015, as a video on demand division of The Orchard, a subsidiary of Sony Entertainment. By year end, the company expanded to theatrical releases, initially setting a seven-film release with Mark Duplass, and Jay Duplass. The company also picked up Cartel Land, which went on to get an Academy Award nomination for Best Documentary in 2016.

In September 2016, the company announced a film transparency platform to help independent filmmakers get more data around rentals, streams and purchases as well as projections for when a film will break even and start generating profits.

In January 2019, The Orchard divested itself of its film and television assets. These were acquired by 1091 Media, a holding company owned by the original ownership team of The Orchard, the private equity firm Dimensional Associates. The company's final films were Japanese Borscht and Baristas before being rebranded as 1091 Media on April 3, 2019.

In April 2019, film studio Fathom Events signed a multi-year distribution deal with 1091 Media.

In July 2020, the company announced a new CTO, Simon Zhu, rebranded its distribution business as 1091 Pictures, and rebranded its parent company as Streamwise. Streamwise is a new technology platform the company is developing to provide distributors, production companies and filmmakers with insights and consolidated financial information for their releases, along with consolidated access to top streaming channels and other services. A private beta of the Streamwise platform is expected to release in December 2020, beginning with more than 500 distributors already tied to 1091 Pictures. The launch of Streamwise marks the final step in the separation of 1091's systems from its previous owner, The Orchard.

In August 2020, former Roku executive, Doug Shineman, joined 1091 Pictures and Streamwise as CRO, leading teams responsible for revenue generation, including all dealmaking, strategy and marketing for the business.

In March 2022, Chicken Soup for the Soul Entertainment acquired 1091 Pictures.

On April 23, 2024, Chicken Soup for the Soul announced a $636.6 million loss in 2023, and warned that without any options to generate additional financing, the company may be forced to liquidate or pause operations, and seek a potential Chapter 11 bankruptcy protection filing. On June 29, 2024, the company filed for Chapter 11 bankruptcy protection after missing a week of paying its employees and failing to secure financing. On July 11, the U.S. Bankruptcy Court approved a conversion of the bankruptcy to Chapter 7, which would signal a liquidation of the company's assets, and the cessation of its subsidiaries, including 1091 Pictures.

== Filmography ==
=== As The Orchard ===
Release date	Film title	Notes
January 16, 2015	Loitering with Intent	
February 3, 2015	What We Do in the Shadows	
May 29, 2015	Club Life	
August 18, 2015	6 Years	
February 9, 2016	A Stand Up Guy	
April 28, 2016	The American Side	
October 14, 2016	Christine	
January 24, 2017	Long Nights Short Mornings	
June 9, 2017	The Hero	
September 29, 2017	Super Dark Times	
October 29, 2017	Dismissed	
March 16, 2018	Flower	
April 20, 2018	The Devil and Father Amorth	
August 14, 2018	American Animals	
September 11, 2018	Paper Year	
May 17, 2019	Unacknowledged: An Exposé of the World's Greatest Secret	
June 2019	Baristas	
June 6, 2019	The Vic	
May 2019	The Renegade	

=== Under 1091 Pictures ===
Release date	Film title	Notes
May 3, 2019	Meeting Gorbachev	
May 24, 2019	Halston	
August 2, 2019	Them That Follow	
August 30, 2019	Before You Know It	
September 6, 2019	Blink of an Eye	
September 6, 2019	Linda Ronstadt: The Sound of My Voice	co-distribution with Greenwich Entertainment
September 27, 2019	Sister Aimee	
November 5, 2019	Return to Mount Kennedy	
December 6, 2019	Midnight Family	
February 12, 2020	Intersect	
March 13, 2020	A Kid From Coney Island	
April 7, 2020	Close Encounters of the Fifth Kind: Contact has Begun	
April 7, 2020	What You Gonna Do When The World's On Fire	
April 14, 2020	The Legend of Swee' Pea	
April 28, 2020	Until The Birds Return	
May 2, 2020	Feral	
June 16, 2020	The Pollinators	
June 16, 2020	Seahorse: The Dad Who Gave Birth	
June 23, 2020	The Ghost of Peter Sellers	
August 4, 2020	The Stand: How One Gesture Shook The World	
August 4, 2020	Star Light	
August 4, 2020	CRSHD	
August 18, 2020	Tracks	
August 18, 2020	A Life of Endless Summers: The Bruce Brown Story	
September 15, 2020	Wheels	
September 29, 2020	Chasing the Present	
September 29, 2020	Inez & Doug & Kira	
October 6, 2020	The Phenomenon	
October 6, 2020	Naughty Books	
October 6, 2020	DEAD (In Cinemas 9/25)	
October 6, 2020	Treason	
October 6, 2020	Tanner Hall Forever	
October 6, 2020	The Ringmaster	
October 13, 2020	When the Storm Fades	
October 13, 2020	Bane: Holding These Moments	
October 13, 2020	The Dance	
October 20, 2020	The Mothman Legacy	
October 20, 2020	Tar	
November 10, 2020	Transference: A Love Story	
November 17, 2020	1 Night in San Diego	
December 1, 2020	Disco	
December 1, 2020	Alt Space	
December 8, 2020	The Planters	
December 15, 2020	The Last Blockbuster	
January 19, 2021	Ten Minutes To Midnight	
January 19, 2021	Personhood	
January 26, 2021	A Woman's Work: The NFL's Cheerleader Problem	
February 9, 2021	Sator	
February 9, 2021	Tazmanian Devil	
February 16, 2021	Alice Fades Away	
August 24, 2021	Echoes of Violence	
October 1, 2021	Runt	
October 12, 2021	The Cleaner	
November 2, 2021	Curtis	
November 2, 2021	Electric Jesus	
November 9, 2021	The Drummer	
October 18, 2022	Moment of Contact	
November 8, 2022	Vide Noir	
