= Before I Fall in Love =

2000 single by CoCo Lee

Single by Coco Lee

from the album Just No Other Way
- Released: July 12, 1999
- Genre: Pop
- Length: 3:44
- Label: 550, Epic
- Songwriters: Allan Rich, Sean Hosein, Dorothy Sea Gazeley, Dane DeViller
- Producer: CoCo Lee

Coco Lee singles chronology
"Di Da Di" (1998)	"Before I Fall in Love" (1999)	"Do You Want My Love" (2000)

"Before I Fall in Love" is a song by Hong Kong-born American singer-songwriter Coco Lee. It was released as her debut single from her English debut album, Just No Other Way on July 12, 1999. The song was originally recorded by Canadian singer Joanne Pennock on her album Joanne released in 1995. Lee's rendition of the song which she executively produced herself was originally included as an album track on the soundtrack of the Julia Roberts film Runaway Bride released in the same year, before having a commercial release of the song worldwide in 2000.

== Background and impact ==
In 1998, Lee was cast as the voice of Mulan in the Mandarin version of the Disney animated film, while also delivering a Mandarin version of Christina Aguilera's soundtrack hit, "Reflection". Her exposure led to Sony Music CEO Tommy Mottola signing her to 550 Music, a unit of Sony Music Entertainment. Unlike her Mandarin albums, Lee expressed interest in recording R&B songs, something she has wanted to explore in recording for a mainstream American audience. Lee began working on her English debut album Just No Other Way in early 1999, with Mottola handpicking "Before I Fall in Love" as a promotional single for the Runaway Bride film.

As part of Tommy Mottola's roster of new artists for 550 Music, Lee was heavily compared to his former protégé, American singer Mariah Carey, whom Lee is personally a fan of. Unlike Carey who did not have full control of her albums prior to Butterfly, Mottola allowed Lee to be in charge of the direction and production of her English debut album. Lee worked with Ric Wake in the album's production, and collaborated with R&B gospel singer Kelly Price for "Can't Get Over", a track Lee produced entirely by herself. "Before I Fall in Love" became Lee's signature song in Southeast Asia, where the song is most popular in. It topped the MTV Asia Hitlist in August 1999, making her the first Asian-American artist to achieve the feat.

== See also ==
- Exposed (CoCo Lee album)
