= Wherever You Go (Coco Lee song) =

Single by Coco Lee

from the album Just No Other Way
- Released: September 21, 2000
- Genre: Pop
- Length: 4:19 (album version); 3:50 (radio edit)
- Label: 550 Music; Epic
- Songwriters: Arnold Roman; Steve Skinner
- Producer: Ric Wake

Coco Lee singles chronology
"Do You Want My Love" (2000)	"Wherever You Go" (2000)	"I Have A Dream" (2008)

Music video
- "Wherever You Go" on YouTube

"Wherever You Go" is a song by Chinese-American singer CoCo Lee, released on September 21, 2000. It was released as the second single from her twelfth studio album and first English-language album, Just No Other Way, by Epic and 550 Music.

The song became a moderate hit in Australia, peaking at number 29.

== Background and release ==
CoCo Lee, known for her breakthrough in the American market as the first Chinese singer to achieve moderate success, included "Wherever You Go" as part of her English-language debut album, Just No Other Way. The song was one of three singles from the album, alongside "Do You Want My Love" and the promotional single "Before I Fall in Love", which was featured on the Runaway Bride soundtrack. The song was written by Arnie Roman and Steve Skinner, and was produced by Ric Wake. Talking about the production of her first English language album, Lee highlighted the difference in production timelines between her Asian and English material, noting that Just No Other Way took nine months to produce due to meticulous musical arrangements in the US, compared to her faster-paced Asian recording process. In particular, she highlighted "Wherever You Go" as this song was recorded in only fifteen minutes, surprising producer Ric Wake, who had reserved two days for the session, and compared her efficiency to Celine Dion.

The single was released in 2000 as the album's second in Australia and Europe. The CD singles featured various remixes, including contributions from Soda Club and Jonathan Peters.

== Reception ==
Writing for L'Officiel Singapore, Đức Noise and Hanan Haddad described "Wherever You Go" as a track that "transports you to a world brimming with rosy hues, promises of the future, and a sense of hope." They praised the music video's vibrant aesthetic and Lee's captivating performance, noting the song's lively tempo and robust rhythm that culminate in a climactic chorus.

== Track listing ==
Australia CD single

1. "Wherever You Go" (radio edit) – 3:50
2. "Wherever You Go" (Soda Club Mix) – 3:44
3. "Wherever You Go" (Soda Club Master Mix) – 7:40
4. "Wherever You Go" (Jonathan Peters Radio Mix) – 3:54
5. "Wherever You Go" (Jonathan Peters Extended Radio Mix) – 5:32
6. "Do You Want My Love" (Soda Club Master Mix) – 7:12

Europe CD single

1. "Wherever You Go" (radio edit) – 3:50
2. "Wherever You Go" (Jonathan Peters Extended Radio Mix) – 5:32
3. "Wherever You Go" (Soda Club Master Mix) – 7:40
4. "Wherever You Go" (Soda Fillet Of Soul Mix) – 7:36

== Personnel ==
Credits adapted from the liner notes of the CD single.

- CoCo Lee – vocals, executive-producer
- Ric Wake – producer
- Russ DeSalvo – arranger, keyboard, guitars
- Ann Marie Milazzo – backing vocals
- Patrick Carroll – drum programming
- "Young" Dave Scheuer – recording engineer
- Gustavo Celis – recording engineer
- Thomas R. Yezzi – recording engineer
- David Barratt – production coordinator
- Jim Annunziato – assistant engineer
- Dan Hetzel – mixing engineer
- Jonathan Peters – remixer
- Tony Calluccio – remixer
- Soda Club – remixer, additional production, programming
- Andy & Pete Lee – all instrumentation and programming

== Charts ==
Chart (2000)	Position
Australia (ARIA)	29
