= Wherever You Go =

Wherever You Go may refer to:

- Wherever You Go (Clint Black song), 1995
- Wherever You Go (Coco Lee song), 2000
- Wherever You Go, a song by Built to Spill from You in Reverse
- Wherever You Go, a song by Richard Marx from Right Here Waiting
- Wherever You Go, a song by The Avalanches from We Will Always Love You
- Wherever You Go, a song by Jonas Blue from Blue
- Wherever You Go, a song by Hurts from Desire
- Wherever You Go, a single by Inna
