= Crouching Tiger, Hidden Dragon (soundtrack) =

Soundtrack album by Tan Dun
- Released: 2000
- Genre: Soundtrack, Classical
- Length: 50:13
- Label: Sony Classical

Crouching Tiger, Hidden Dragon is the original soundtrack album of the 2000 Academy Award- and Golden Globe Award-winning film Crouching Tiger, Hidden Dragon starring Yun-Fat Chow, Michelle Yeoh, Ziyi Zhang and Chang Chen. The score was composed by Tan Dun, originally performed by Shanghai Symphony Orchestra, Shanghai National Orchestra, and Shanghai Percussion Ensemble. It also features many solo passages for cello played by Yo-Yo Ma. The "last track" (A Love Before Time) features Coco Lee. The music for the entire film was produced in two weeks.

In addition to the awards won (see below) the score was also nominated for a Golden Globe but lost to the score of the film Gladiator.

Tan Dun arranged portions of the film score into a concerto for cello and orchestra called the Crouching Tiger Concerto. Chen Yuanlin also collaborated in the project.

== Track listing ==
1. Crouching Tiger, Hidden Dragon 3:24
2. The Eternal Vow 3:02
3. A Wedding Interrupted 2:16
4. Night Fight 3:11
5. Silk Road 3:09
6. To the South 2:21
7. Through the Bamboo Forest 4:23
8. The Encounter 2:41
9. Desert Capriccio 4:33
10. In the Old Temple 3:47
11. Yearning of the Sword 3:34
12. Sorrow 4:03
13. Farewell 2:25
14. A Love Before Time (English) 3:46
15. A Love Before Time (Mandarin) 3:38
16. Green Destiny (Love Theme) 2:21 (Bonus on Japanese edition)
