= Jim Annunziato =

Background information
- Born: July 10, 1974 (age 51)
- Origin: Massapequa, NY
- Genres: Pop Music; Latin Music
- Occupations: Record Producer; Recording engineer Studio Owner
- Years active: 1999-present
- Website: Official website

Jim Annunziato is a Grammy Award winning American recording engineer.

== Career ==
Annunziato has worked with many mainstream artists including Jennifer Lopez, Marc Anthony, Celine Dion, Brie Larson, Jessica Simpson and Lionel Richie. He has also been credited as Pro tools engineer on the Oscar winning Miramax movie, Chicago with Catherine Zeta-Jones and Richard Gere.

== Awards and nominations ==
At the 14th Annual Latin Grammy Awards in 2013, Jim was awarded a Latin Grammy for Record of the Year for his engineer work on the Marc Anthony hit single, Vivir Mi Vida. The following year, at the 2014 Latin Grammy Awards, Jim was nominated in the category of Record of the Year for Marc Anthony's Cambio De Piel, and Album of the Year for Marc Anthony’s 3.0.

== Discography ==
1999

- Rosie O'Donnell A Rosie Christmas - Engineer
- Diana Ross “Everyday is a New Day" - Assistant Engineer

2000

- Son by Four A Puro Dolor - Engineer
- Anastacia Not That Kind - Digital editor
- Lucero “Mi Destino” - Engineer
- Coco Lee Just No Other Way - Engineer
- Rosie O'Donnell Another Rosie Christmas Engineer

2001

- Ginuwine "Just Because" (single) - Engineer
- Ginuwine The Life - Mixing
- Jennifer Lopez "Love Don’t Cost a Thing" - Mixing Assistant
- Jennifer Lopez J.Lo - Mixing Assistant
- Anastacia Freak of Nature - Engineer

2002

- VH1 Divas: 2002 - Engineer
- Marc Anthony Mended - Mixing
- Chicago [The Miramax Motion Picture Soundtrack] - Digital editing, mixing assistant
- Celine Dion A New Day Has Come - Engineer
- Kelly Osbourne "Changes" - Engineer
- Enrique Escape - Engineer

2003

- Lionel Richie The Definitive Collection - Engineer
- Celine Dion One Heart - Mixing assistant
- Jessica Simpson In This Skin - Assistant engineer
- Thalia "Baby, I'm in Love" Thalia (Virgin Records/ EMI Latin) — Engineer

2004

- Lionel Richie Encore - Engineer
- “Ella Enchanted” [Original Soundtrack] - Mixing assistant

2005

- Jennifer Lopez Rebirth - Assistant engineer
- Anastacia Pieces of a Dream - Engineer, mixing
- Brie Larson Finally Out of P.E. - Engineer
- Hed Kandi: Winter Chill 06.04 - Vocal engineer
- Bride & Prejudice - Vocal engineer

2006

- David Bisbal Premonición - Engineer
- Don Dinero El Ultimo Guerrero - Engineer

2007

- Jennifer Lopez Brave - Engineer

2011

- Jennifer Lopez Love? - Vocal Engineer

2013

- Marc Anthony 3.0 - Vocal engineer

2016

- Jordan White High Road (Pangea Recordings) - Producer
