= Forever Friends (Olympic theme song) =

Forever Friends is a song written by Italian composer Giorgio Moroder and Chinese pianist Xiang-Dong Kong. It competed in the selection of the theme song for the 2008 Summer Olympics and was officially released on November 29, 2007.

== Creation Members ==
- Composer: Giorgio Moroder, the Italian composer, Hollywood music, won three Oscar Awards, the two Grammy Awards, 39 Oscar nominations, a representative of the 1984 Los Angeles Olympic Games official theme song: "Reach Out", 1988 Seoul Olympic Games official theme song: "Hand in Hand", in 1990 Italia World Cup official song: "Un'estate italiana", "Showy Enough" movie soundtrack, and in 1993 the creation of Beijing's Olympic bid, "Good Luck Beijing".
- Composer, production: Xiang-Dong Kong, a famous musician, the 1986 Tchaikovsky International Piano Competition in Moscow in 1987 and the International Competition in Spain Santander, he twice became the youngest winner, thus leading to the attention of the world music scene; 1988 He became a U.S. Ji Naba Mr. Gold Award winners of international competitions; one stroke in 1992 he was the fifth Sydney International Piano Competition in the first four awards and special awards. Masterpieces: "Tibet Dream", "Harmony Garden", "Forever Friends".
- Lyrics: Michael Kunze, the German word writer, a masterpiece: the famous German musical "Elisabeth" and "Dance of the Vampire", "Mozart" and "Butterfly Dream" and the musical "Cats", "The Phantom of the Opera" and "Evita", "Song and Dance online", and "terrorist shop" and "call on the forest" and "Spider-female kiss" and "loving the view", "Sunset Boulevard" and "Clock Tower Frankenstein", "Lion King" and "Mama meters ah", "Aida" and "evil witch" with the German translation of the lyrics.
- Producer: Giorgio Moroder, HE Jian Min (Thomas Ho, deceased), Xiang-Dong Kong.
- Singer, Coco Lee, the first Chinese singer to perform in the Oscars, many times in the 10 selected China-Taiwan idols, and nominated hits Longhu Bang.
- Singer: Sun Nan, a famous Chinese singer, won several music awards Chinese music authority in the Best Male Singer Award, as well as most popular male singer award.
- Director: Mr. Yang Dongsheng, China Central Television director, several of the CCTV Spring Festival Party, and other large-scale variety show's general director, the Stars won several awards.
