= Exposed (CoCo Lee album) =

Studio album by Coco Lee
- Released: March 25, 2005
- Recorded: 2001–2004
- Studios: Sony Music Studios (Manhattan, New York City, New York): Cove City Sound Studios (Glen Cove, New York)
- Genres: Pop; dance-pop; urban pop; R&B; electropop
- Length: 46:35
- Language: English
- Label: Epic
- Producers: Ric Wake; Coco Lee; Damon Sharpe; Eric Sanicola; Greg Lawson

Coco Lee chronology
D.IS.CoCo (2002)	Exposed (2005)	Just Want You (2006)

Singles from Exposed
- 1. "No Doubt" Released: March 22, 2005; 2. "Magic Words" Released: March 22, 2005; 3. "So Good" Released: March 22, 2005; 4. "All Around The World" Released: March 25, 2005

Exposed is the fifteenth studio album by Chinese-American singer Coco Lee. It was released on March 25, 2005 by Epic. It is her second English-language album after "Just No Other Way".

Lee co-wrote and co-produced the album with a number of musicians including Ric Wake, Eric Sanicola, Greg Lawson, Henrik Ahlgren, Damon Sharpe, Matt Nyberg and Michael Anthony Fields.

Lee is heavily involved with the recording, production and creative direction of this album, she considered Exposed as her "most personal album ever".

== Summary ==
The album has four commercial singles:

1. "No Doubt" featuring Blazee
2. "Magic Words"
3. "So Good"
4. "All Around the World"

The lead single "No Doubt" is a dance-pop song with lyrical topic of sex delivered over a backdrop of electronica and slow hip-hop.

The fourth single "All Around the World" was released as a commercial single as the theme song to the Asian version of the film Charlie's Angels: Full Throttle.

== Reception ==
The album received commercial success throughout Asia. Notably in Taiwan it topped the album chart for three weeks.

== Track listing ==
Standard Edition

1. "Step In"
2. "No Doubt" (featuring Blaaze)
3. "Gotta Clue" (featuring Joon Park from g.o.d.)
4. "Hush"
5. "So Good"
6. "Touch"
7. "Rock It"
8. "All Around the Word"
9. "Belly Dance"
10. "Cool" (featuring Joon Park from g.o.d.)
11. "Music We Make"
12. "No Doubt" (featuring Joon Park from g.o.d.)
13. "Magic Words"

UK Edition (2007)

1. "Step In (Intro)"
2. "No Doubt" (featuring Blaaze)
3. "Gotta Clue" (featuring Joon Park from g.o.d.)
4. "So Good"
5. "Can We Talk About It"
6. "Rock It"
7. "All Around the World"
8. "Belly Dance"
9. "Can't Get Over" (featuring Kelly Price)
10. "Touch"
11. "Music We Make"
12. "Cool" (featuring Joon Park from g.o.d.)
13. "Hush"

Bonus Tracks:

14. "No Doubt (Remix)"
15. "Did You Really Love Me?"
16. "Magic Words"
