= A Love Before Time =

2000 song by Coco Lee

Song by Coco Lee
- Released: 2000
- Genre: pop
- Length: 3:46 (English); 3:38 (Mandarin)
- Songwriters: Tan Dun; Jorge Calandrelli; James Schamus; Kevin Yi (Mandarin Version)

Music video
- "A Love Before Time" on YouTube

"A Love Before Time" is a song for Ang Lee’s movie Crouching Tiger, Hidden Dragon. It was sung by Chinese-American singer CoCo Lee and featured Yo-Yo Ma on cello, with music by Tan Dun and Jorge Calandrelli. The English lyrics was written by James Schamus. Released in 2000, the song was nominated for Best Original Song at the 73rd Academy Awards.

CoCo Lee performed the song at the Academy Awards ceremony in March 2001. She is the first, and so far only, Chinese to perform at the Awards.

The song was introduced by the actress Julia Stiles as an “evocative love ballad” that combined "the flavor and texture of Eastern music with the orchestral color and sensitive lyrics of Western culture" in the ceremony.

Ang Lee also recorded a Chinese (Mandarin) version of the song, 月光愛人. Performed by Coco Lee, the lyrics of this version were written by Kevin Yi during a flight to the US.

== Personnel ==
- Music composed by Jorge Calandrelli and Tan Dun
- Lyrics by James Schamus
- Translation by Elaine Chow
- Produced by Jorge Calandrelli
- Vocals by Coco Lee
- Cello Solos by Yo-Yo Ma

== See also ==
- Crouching Tiger, Hidden Dragon (soundtrack)
