= Just No Other Way =

Studio album by Coco Lee
- Released: 2 November 1999
- Recorded: 1999
- Genre: Pop; R&B; dance
- Length: 43:35
- Label: 550; Epic
- Producer: Bradley; Michael Caplan; Cutfather; Dane DeViller; Jimmy Greco; Erik "E-Smooth" Hicks; Sean Hosein; Danny Madden; Kelly Price; Ric Wake

Coco Lee chronology
Today Until Forever (1999)	Just No Other Way (1999)	True Lover You & Me (2000)

Singles from Just No Other Way
- 1. "Do You Want My Love" Released: 10 January 2000; 2. "Wherever You Go" Released: 21 September 2000

Just No Other Way is the twelfth studio album by Chinese-American singer CoCo Lee, released on 2 November 1999 by Epic and 550 Music. It consists of pop and R&B songs. It features the singles "Do You Want My Love", "Wherever You Go", and the promo single "Before I Fall in Love", which was included on the Runaway Bride soundtrack.

== Reception ==
Professional ratings
Review scores
Source	Rating
AllMusic	4.5/5 stars
Entertainment Weekly	D

Just No Other Way was a commercial success in Asia, having three Top 10 singles (including one No. 1 single) on the MTV Asia Hitlist.

As soon as "Before I Fall in Love" topped the charts as her breakthrough single, Lee became the first female Asian singer to top both the Asia Hitlist and Top 100 Asia Singles Airplay. Her next single, "Do You Want My Love", peaked at number two for six weeks, while her last single, "Wherever You Go", managed to peak at number three. This is another record for Lee, becoming the only Asian artist to have three singles eneteted the top three in the Asia Hitlist.

"Do You Want My Love" received international success, peaking at No. 49 on the US Hot Dance Club Play chart, No. 14 on the Australian Singles Chart, No. 20 on the New Zealand Singles Chart, also achieved No. 91 on the Year-End Australian Singles Chart. "Wherever You Go" peaked at number 29 in Australia. As of February 2000, the album has sold 500,000 copies in Asia. As of June 2003, Just No Other Way sold 40,000 copies in the United States, according to Nielsen SoundScan.

== Track listing ==
Just No Other Way – Standard edition
No.	Title	Writer(s)	Length
1.	"Do You Want My Love"	Saskia Garel; Jimmy Greco; Jillian Armsbury; Kenneth Hairston	4:35
2.	"Just No Other Way (To Love Me)"	Dane DeViller; Sean Hosein; Jack Kugell	4:14
3.	"Can't Get Over" (featuring Kelly Price)	Belmatt; Hansen; Price	4:06
4.	"Did You Ever Really Love Me?"	Ray Contrereas; Greco	4:02
5.	"Before I Fall in Love"	DeViller; Hosein; Allan Rich; Dorothy Gazeley	3:44
6.	"Wherever You Go"	Arnold Roman; Steve Skinner	4:19
7.	"I Will Be Your Friend"	DeViller; Hosein; Michelle Lewis	3:28
8.	"All Tied Up in You"	Ty Lacy; Bradley Spalter	4:17
9.	"Don't You Want My Love"	Nova	3:50
10.	"Crazy Ridiculous"	Steve Clarke; Darnell Cunningham; Harold Frasier; Nicole Renee; Roget Romain	3:02
11.	"Can We Talk About It"	Erik "E-Smooth" Hicks	3:58
Total length:			43:40

Just No Other Way – International standard edition/Japan bonus track
No.	Title	Length
12.	"Do You Want My Love" (Hex Hector Radio Edit)	3:50
Total length:		47:30

Just No Other Way – Korea bonus tracks
No.	Title	Length
12.	"Do You Want My Love" (Kenny Diaz Remix)	3:53
13.	"Just No Other Way" (featuring Jin-young Park)	4:15
Total length:		51:48

== Charts ==
=== Album ===
Chart performance for Just No Other Way
Chart (2000)	Peak position
Australian Albums (ARIA)	69

=== Singles ===
Title	Year	Chart positions			
Title	Year	AUS	NZ	UK	US Dance
"Do You Want My Love"	2000	14	20	84	49
"Wherever You Go"	2000	29	—	—	—

== Release history ==
Release history and formats for Just No Other Way
Country	Release date	Format	Label
Asia	December 1999	Standard (CD)	Sony
United States	29 February 2000	Standard (CD)	550, Epic
