= Do You Want My Love =

2000 single by CoCo Lee

Single by Coco Lee

from the album Just No Other Way
- B-side: "Crazy Ridiculous"
- Released: January 10, 2000
- Genre: Dance
- Length: 4:35 (album version); 3:53 (radio edit)
- Label: 550; Epic
- Songwriters: Saskia Garel; Jimmy Greco; Jillian Armsbury; Kenneth Hairston
- Producers: Jimmy Greco; Ray Contreras

Coco Lee singles chronology
"Before I Fall in Love" (1999)	"Do You Want My Love" (2000)	"Wherever You Go" (2000)

Music video
- "Do You Want My Love" on YouTube

"Do You Want My Love" is a song by Hong Kong-born American singer-songwriter Coco Lee. It was released as the lead single from her English debut album, Just No Other Way (1999), on January 10, 2000.

== Background ==
"Do You Want My Love" was written by Jimmy Greco, Saskia Garel, Jillian Armsbury, and Kenneth Hairston, and it is a dance track. In November 1999, before the single's release, promotional copies featuring remixes by Kenny Diaz and Hex Hector were sent to dance clubs. The song was first serviced to US hot adult contemporary radio on January 10, 2000, then was sent to rhythmic contemporary radio on February 8 and to contemporary hit radio on February 22. In the United Kingdom, the single was released on June 12, 2000, as a CD and cassette.

== Chart performance ==
From the strength of its pre-release club play, "Do You Want My Love" appeared on the US Billboard Hot Dance Breakouts charts at number four on December 18, 1999. On February 5, 2000, it entered the Billboard Dance Club Play chart at number 49, charting for that week only. Later the same month, the single entered the Australian Singles Chart top 50, spending eight weeks on the chart before peaking at number 14 in early April. The song also charted in New Zealand, where it reached number 20 in late April and spent four weeks in the top 50. In Europe, the song appeared on the UK Singles Chart at number 84 on the week beginning June 18, 2000, then left the top 100 the following week.

== Track listings ==
US CD single

1. "Do You Want My Love" (radio edit) – 3:53
2. "Do You Want My Love" (without rap) – 3:53
3. "Do You Want My Love" (alternate lyric) – 3:53
4. "Do You Want My Love" (alternate lyric without rap) – 3:53
5. "Do You Want My Love" (Kenny Diaz radio edit) – 3:54
6. "Do You Want My Love" (Hex Hector radio edit) – 3:43

Australian CD single

1. "Do You Want My Love" (without rap) – 3:53
2. "Do You Want My Love" – 4:35
3. "Do You Want My Love" (Kenny Diaz radio edit) – 3:54
4. "Do You Want My Love" (Hex Hector mix) – 7:44
5. "Do You Want My Love" (alternate lyric without rap) – 3:53
6. Multimedia

European CD single

1. "Do You Want My Love" (radio edit) – 3:53
2. "Do You Want My Love" (Hex Hector mix) – 7:44

European maxi-CD single

1. "Do You Want My Love" (radio edit) – 3:53
2. "Do You Want My Love" (Kenny Diaz radio edit) – 3:54
3. "Do You Want My Love" (Hex Hector mix) – 7:44

Italian 7-inch single

A. "Do You Want My Love" – 3:53
B. "Candy" (by Mandy Moore) – 3:56

Dutch 12-inch single

A1. "Do You Want My Love" (album version) – 4:35
A2. "Do You Want My Love" (Hex Hector mix) – 7:44
B1. "Do You Want My Love" (Kenny Diaz radio edit) – 3:53
B2. "Do You Want My Love" (Hex Hector instrumental) – 7:44

UK CD single

1. "Do You Want My Love" (radio edit) – 3:53
2. "Do You Want My Love" (Soda Club master mix) – 7:12
3. "Crazy Ridiculous" – 3:02
4. "Do You Want My Love" (video)

UK cassette single

1. "Do You Want My Love" (radio edit)
2. "Do You Want My Love" (Soda Club master edit)
3. "Crazy Ridiculous"

== Charts ==
=== Weekly charts ===
Chart (2000)	Peak position
Australia (ARIA)	14
New Zealand (Recorded Music NZ)	20
UK Singles (OCC)	84
US Dance Club Songs (Billboard)	49

=== Year-end charts ===
Chart (2000)	Position
Australia (ARIA)	91

== Certifications ==
Region	Certification	Certified units/sales
Australia (ARIA)	Gold	35,000^{^}
^{^} Shipments figures based on certification alone.

== Release history ==
Region	Date	Format(s)	Label(s)	Ref.
United States	November 1999	Promotional club formats	550; Epic	
United States	January 10, 2000	Hot adult contemporary radio	550; Epic	
United States	February 8, 2000	Rhythmic contemporary radio	550; Epic	
United States	February 22, 2000	Contemporary hit radio	550; Epic	
United Kingdom	June 12, 2000	CD; cassette	550; Epic	
