= MTV Asia Hitlist =

- Created by: MTV Asia
- Starring: MTV VJs
- Country of origin: Asia

Production
- Running time: 60 minutes

Original release
- Network: MTV
- Release: January 1, 1996 – 2005

MTV Asia Hitlist is an Asian chart show or countdown on MTV Asia, produced by MTV Asia and hosted by MTV VJs, which first aired in 1996. It resembles the MTV US show TRL, which also featured music videos in a countdown. From 1996 to 1999, the show presented the Top 20 videos in Asia, lasting for two hours with advertisements. However, in 2000, it was reduced to the Top 10, now consuming only one hour. A year later, the Top 20 was brought back this time lasting only one hour as not all the videos were shown. "One Sweet Day" by Mariah Carey and Boyz II Men was the first single to top the charts.

== History ==
It was believed that MTV Asia had yet to come up with an update as to what shows can bring viewers' attention to the Asian version of MTV. Since MTV Asia had less shows, the producers decided to create a countdown that resembled the Billboard Hot 100, however, having Asia as the direct source of popularity. The show became as instant success, as different genres were able to enter the countdown due to Asia's diversity to music. Artists like the Backstreet Boys, Jennifer Lopez, Mariah Carey, the Spice Girls, Britney Spears, and Green Day were known to be chart toppers in the Hitlist.

=== Reformat ===
After four years of having the Top 20 videos being broadcast, the network decided to lessen the number of videos to ten since there were many shows to accommodate. In 2000, only the Top 10 were shown, though people speculated that the producers tabulated the Top 20, since there were "bubbling up" videos that were shown to the audience. After a year, they resumed the Top 20, this time, acquiring only one hour, since not all videos from the Top 20 were shown.

Since July 24, 2005 MTV Asia Hitlist has been renamed MTV Chart Attack, the program changed the chart format, now features only Top 10, like the 2000 chart format.

=== Affiliations ===
The MTV Asia Hitlist is based on viewers' requests, album and singles sales, radio airplay and music downloads. Determining the singles that enter the Top 20 is in cooperation of the record labels and companies, Nielsen Soundscan, and the Asian 100 Singles Airplay. In Asia, the MTV Network works in cooperation with extensive research from local MTV stations like MTV Indonesia, MTV India, MTV Philippines, MTV Mainland China, and MTV Japan.

== Policies ==
Policies in the Asia Hitlist have been made in accordance to charting songs in the countdown. Several songs may have been given consideration due to its extreme reception in the Asian market. Various reasons for charting songs have special cases, and are deliberated by the makers of the MTV Asia Hitlist.

=== Multiple Entries ===
Artists may have multiple entries in the chart, and may occupy the top positions at the same time, which happened in 2002, where the Top 3 songs in one week were all of Mandy Moore's songs from her movie "A Walk to Remember." "Cry," "Someday We'll Know," and "Only Hope" occupied the Top 3 positions in May 2002, and all songs were able to top the charts, earning Moore her first three #1 singles.

=== Scope Release ===
Regardless of the scope of release, Asia was exempted from US and UK release. One example is "Born To Make You Happy" and "From The Bottom Of My Broken Heart" by Britney Spears. "Born To Make You Happy" was released in the UK and other parts of the globe except for the US, while "From The Bottom Of my Broken Heart" was only released in the US. In the Asia Hitlist, both singles charted with the former topping the chart for 2 weeks, and the latter peaking at #2.

=== Double-sided Releases ===
Double-sided releases were not considered to be a major factor in Asian releases. It was noted that each of the singles chart differently, since both songs totally differed from another. One example is the double-sided single "Mama" and "Who Do You Think You Are" by the Spice Girls. Considered a double-sided single in the UK, it charted in the Asia Hitlist as two different entries, with each video justifying its eligibility to chart. However, in the case of Mariah Carey's "Always Be My Baby," which was double-sided with "Slipping Away," the former charted as the official release excluding the latter from gaining popularity. "Always Be My Baby" became Carey's #1 hit while "Slipping Away" was disregarded and was not released.

=== Video Accompaniment ===
Charting songs have been completely eligible when there is an accompanying music video, which is used for commercial release. The first song to chart without a commercial video release was "Incomplete" by Sisqo, his second number one. The single didn't have an accompanying video for a release, but eight weeks later after charting, an official video was released. The song was not aired during the period wherein there was no accompanying video, and a picture of Sisqo was shown during recaps of the countdown. It was only after it fell from the top spot that that video was released, thus the airplay of the song was eligible.

=== Remixes ===
In the early years of the Hitlist, remixes were eligible to chart if it was a dance remix or "radio" mix of an album's cut. It means that a remix's eligibility to chart depends entirely on the original version, since both versions are credited as one. The more popular the remix is, the higher the chart position. In 1999, Mariah Carey's single "I Still Believe" came out with a remix featuring Da Brat and Krayzie Bone entitled "I Still Believe/Pure Imagination." Since it was an entirely different track from the original, it was considered to chart as a different entry. Conflict arose with her next remixes for singles "Heartbreaker" and "Thank God I Found You," which the former was said to be based on the original version, and the latter to only adapt the chorus of the original version as an adlib. "Thank God I Found You" was given an exception, since the remix version was entirely of a different structure and it no longer resembled the original recording.

The same trend followed in the 2000s, wherein Jennifer Lopez' remixes for "I'm Real" and "Ain't It Funny" topped the chart. Both the original versions of the song were able to chart during its release, but their follow-up remixes were of higher popularity and airplay. "Ain't It Funny" peaked at #10 and one year later, the remix version topped the charts. The original version of "I'm Real" also topped the charts in 2001, and when sales started to decline, the remix version was released and was enabled to chart as a different single. This made history as "I'm Real" became the first song with both the original version and remix version staying at the chart at the same time, as well as both versions being able to top the charts as well.

An arising conflict fell once again when Britney Spears released "Overprotected" in 2002. In January, the album version (or more commonly known as the "International Version") of the song was released and peaked at #3. After "I'm Not A Girl, Not Yet A Woman," which topped the charts that year, the "Darkchild Remix" was released in the US. Considering that the song resembled the original structure and melody of the song, it was at first, prohibited to chart. The video was extensively played on MTV Non-Stop Hits, but never charted. Extreme airplay and viewer requests increased at the hype of the video's popularity, giving it enough points to break in the Top 20. Considering the fact that it was a North American release, and the song was commercially viable, it was finally enabled to chart. Surprisingly, the song peaked #2, one notch higher than the placement of its original version. Spears became the second artist (and the third instance) to which both the original version and remix version were able to chart in the countdown.

=== Edited Videos ===
Video editing has been the most controversial act imposed by MTV Asia. It rarely happens but once it is imposed on a video, it is never revoked. Videos are edited for several reasons. Nudity, explicit viewing content, and violence are certain examples of reasons for editing videos. The first video to be edited was "Thank U" by Alanis Morissette. In the video, Alanis is nude, but her private parts aren't shown in the video. However, this has been marred too explicit especially to the younger generation, and other religious sects in Asia. An edited version of the video was released, covering almost the whole screen except for Morissette's face. "Thank U" topped the chart in early 1999.

Another video that was edited is George Michael's "Outside." Due to its sexual content, it was never fully shown on MTV. Even when it charted, only about 57 seconds of the video were shown due to enormous sexual content.

The most controversial video to have been extensively edited by the network was "Dirrty" by Christina Aguilera. In the part where Aguilera is in a boxing ring with her dancers at the beginning, a Thai poster is situated at the background while the dance is shown. Depicted in Thai language in the poster were the words "Thai Sex Tourism" and "Young Underage Girls." The video was banned in Thailand but in other parts of Asia, the dance sequence in the beginning were shortened. A live version of the video was mostly played. Regardless of the video's limited release, the song still topped the charts.

After the video for "Dirrty," Aguilera drew more controversy with her next single "Beautiful". In the video, two men were seen kissing each other and were deemed too racy for MTV viewers. Again, MTV Asia edited the video by completely removing the gay scenes out of the video. "Beautiful" became her next number one single and the edited version was played throughout MTV Asia.

== Records ==
=== Asian Breakthrough ===
- The first artist to enter the Asia Hitlist was Singaporean violinist Vanessa-Mae. "Storm" peaked at #10 in 1997. Her next single "I Feel Love" peaked at #4 the same year.
- Malaysian act KRU entered the charts in 1998 with the single "The Way We Jam." The song peaked at #3.
- Indonesian artist Anggun with her debut international single "Snow On The Sahara" peaked at number 2 on the chart for one week, being held from the top spot by Jennifer Paige with “Crush” in September 1998.
- Filipino band and MTV Video Music Award winner Eraserheads, entered the charts in 1997 with "Ang Huling El Bimbo." The song peaked at #6 due to its strong performance resulting from their win at the MTV Video Music Awards in New York. In 1998, "Julie Tearjerky" peaked at #16.
- Hong Kong-born Asian superstar of Chinese-Indonesian ancestry Coco Lee entered the charts in 1999 with the single, "Do You Want My Love" and "Wherever You Go," peaked at #2 and #3 at 2000.
- American-born singer/songwriter of Dutch-Indonesian descent Michelle Branch entered the chart in 2002 with her single The Game of Love with Santana and peaked #2, also her song "Everywhere" entering the chart on 2002 jumped from Bubbling Under into #12, and its the highest debuted song of the year on the chart
- Filipino-American apl.de.ap or Allan Pineda Lindo, a member of The Black Eyed Peas had hits of his own. "The APL Song" debuted at #11, the highest for an Asian artist, and peaked at #5. His next solo single "Bebot," peaked at #3 in 2006.
- Thailand's Tata Young entered the charts in 2004, becoming the first pure Asian artist to enter after nearly four years. "Sexy Naughty Bitchy" peaked at #4 and "I Believe" peaked at #10.
- Singaporean band Electrico enter the hitlist in 2005 with "Runaway", peaked at #11
- Cassie, a female singer of Filipino and African-American descent, peaked at #2 with "Me & U" in 2006. "Long Way 2 Go" peaked at #7 in the same year.
- Filipino-German and Pussycat Dolls lead singer Nicole Scherzinger topped the charts alongside rap mogul Diddy in 2006 with "Come to Me" for 3 weeks.
- Half-Filipino and half-British singer Mutya Buena, formerly of the Sugababes, entered the charts with "Real Girl" in 2007.

=== 1990s ===
- Celine Dion " My Heart Will Go On" #1 for 14 weeks
- The highest debut was "Thank U" by the Alanis Morissette. The song debuted at #7 during 1998.
- Both Elton John and the Spice Girls have the longest running single in the Top 20. "Candle In The Wind" (1997) and "2 Become 1" (1996) spent 21 weeks in the charts.
- Jewel "Hands" 20 weeks on chart.
- Jennifer Lopez "If You Had My Love" has the biggest drop position on chart, it went from no #7 to #20 on the next week

=== 2000s ===
- In 2000, viewers described the charts as predictable, because new entries typically debuted at number 10 and climbed one or two spots at a time to the top. However, after hitting number 1, these songs would often drop to number 4 and 8 in the following weeks before exiting the chart entirely. This pattern occurred for almost every song that reached the top spot, with most tracks only spending 11 to 12 weeks on the chart.
- The Backstreet Boys' hit single Shape of My Heart became one of the longest reigning songs in the number one spot in 2001 although the song was released one year earlier, the song also appeared in Year End countdown of 2001.
- In March 2000, there was a battle for Boyband on the chart, where 98 Degrees, Boyzone, NSYNC, Westlife, and Backstreet Boys entering the chart at the same time, they're all knock off by Britney Spears with "Born to Make You Happy", and eventually Backstreet Boys and Westlife peaked at #1 for 2 weeks.
- The Corrs "Radio" bubbling under on the chart twice, since the chart format was change into Top 10. the song bubbling on 1999 and also in the early 2000.
- Gabrielle "Rise" was bubbling under in May 2000, but never make it to the top 10. Her next singles "When A Woman" entering the chart and peaked at #5
- Blink 182 "The Rock Show" become the longest running single in 2001, spent 15 weeks on the chart.
- Mandy Moore was the first female artist to occupy the Top 3 positions at the same week. "Cry," "Someday We'll Know," and "Only Hope" occupied the Top 3 positions in 2002. All three singles managed to top the charts as well.
- Christina Aguilera in 2004 has two songs on the chart, "Tilt Ya Head Back (w/ Nelly) and "Car Wash (w/ Missy Elliott), both songs appeared on the Top 10 at the same week.
- JoJo is the youngest artist to enter the charts. "Leave (Get Out)" (2004) was released when she was only 13 years of age. The song peaked at #3. Her next single "Baby It's You" featuring Bow Wow peaked at #2. "Too Little Too Late" (2006) also peaked at #2 while she was 15.

== No 1 Song Each Week ==
1996

1997

Week	Artist	Song
December 6	Spice Girls	Spice Up Your Life
Year End		

1998

Week	Artist	Song
July 26	Ricky Martin	The Cup Of Life
Year End	Celine Dion	My Heart Will Go On

1999

Week	Artist	Song
March 21	Britney Spears	Baby One More Time
March 27	Britney Spears	Baby One More Time
April 3	Britney Spears	Baby One More Time
April 10	The Offspring	Pretty Fly (For A White Guy)
April 19	Blondie (band)	Maria
April 26	Blondie (band)	Maria
May 3	Blondie (band)	Maria
May 10	Blondie (band)	Maria
May 17	Ricky Martin	Livin La Vida Loca
May 24	Ricky Martin	Livin La Vida Loca
May 31	Ricky Martin	Livin La Vida Loca
June 7	Ricky Martin	Livin La Vida Loca
June 14	Ricky Martin	Livin La Vida Loca
June 21	Ricky Martin	Livin La Vida Loca
June 28	Ricky Martin	Livin La Vida Loca
July 5	TLC (group)	No Scrubs
July 12	Backstreet Boys	I Want It That Way
July 19	Backstreet Boys	I Want It That Way
July 26	Backstreet Boys	I Want It That Way
August 2	Backstreet Boys	I Want It That Way
August 9	Jennifer Lopez	If You Had My Love
August 16	Jennifer Lopez	If You Had My Love
August 23	Madonna	Beautiful Stranger
August 30	Madonna	Beautiful Stranger
September 6	Sugar Ray	Someday
September 13	Christina Aguilera	Genie In A Bottle
September 20	Christina Aguilera	Genie In A Bottle
September 26	Christina Aguilera	Genie In A Bottle
October 3	Ronan Keating	When You Say Nothing At All
October 10	Ronan Keating	When You Say Nothing At All
October 17	Lou Bega	Mambo No. 5
October 24	Lou Bega	Mambo No. 5
November 1	98 Degrees	I Do (Cherish You)
November 7	Enrique Iglesias	Bailamos
November 14	Backstreet Boys	Larger Than Life
November 28	Backstreet Boys	Larger Than Life
December 6	Savage Garden	I Knew I Loved You
December 13	Savage Garden	I Knew I Loved You
December 20	Jennifer Lopez	Waiting For Tonight
December 27	Jennifer Lopez	Waiting For Tonight
Year End	Ricky Martin	Livin La Vida Loca

2000

Week	Artist	Song
January 10	Will Smith	Will2K
January 17	Will Smith	Will2K
January 24	Alanis Morissette	That I Would Be Good
January 31	Alanis Morissette	That I Would Be Good
February 7	Celine Dion	That's The Way It Is
February 14	Celine Dion	That's The Way It Is
February 20	Boyzone	Everyday I Love You
February 27	Boyzone	Everyday I Love You
March 6	Britney Spears	Born To Make You Happy
March 13	Britney Spears	Born To Make You Happy
March 20	Backstreet Boys	Show Me The Meaning Of Being Lonely
March 27	Backstreet Boys	Show Me The Meaning Of Being Lonely
April 3	Westlife	Seasons In The Sun
April 10	Westlife	Seasons In The Sun
April 17	Madonna	American Pie
April 24	Madonna	American Pie
May 1	Melanie C ft Lisa Lopes	Never Be The Same Again
May 7	Savage Garden	Crash and Burn
May 15	M2M (band)	Mirror Mirror
May 21	Ricky Martin ft Meja	Private Emotion
May 28	Ricky Martin ft Meja	Private Emotion
June 4	Enrique Iglesias	Be With You
June 10	Christina Aguilera	I Turn To You
June 17	Christina Aguilera	I Turn To You
June 24	Britney Spears	Oops... I Did It Again
July 3	Britney Spears	Oops... I Did It Again
July 10	Westlife	Fool Again
July 17	Westlife	Fool Again
July 24	Bon Jovi	Its My Life
July 31	Bon Jovi	Its My Life
August 7	Matchbox Twenty	Bent
August 13	Matchbox Twenty	Bent
August 21	NSYNC	Its Gonna Be Me
August 28	NSYNC	Its Gonna Be Me
September 4	The Corrs	Breathless
September 11	The Corrs	Breathless
September 18	The Corrs	Breathless
September 25	Britney Spears	Lucky
October 1	Britney Spears	Lucky
October 8	Robbie Williams	Rock DJ
October 15	Robbie Williams	Rock DJ
October 23	Ronan Keating	Life Is A Rollercoaster
October 30	Ronan Keating	Life Is A Rollercoaster
November 6	Madonna	Music
November 13	Madonna	Music
November 20	98 Degrees	Give Me Just One Night
November 27	Matchbox Twenty	If You're Gone
December 3	Backstreet Boys	Shape Of My Heart
December 10	Backstreet Boys	Shape Of My Heart
December 17	Backstreet Boys	Shape Of My Heart
December 24	Backstreet Boys	Shape Of My Heart
Year End	No Official Countdown	

2001

Week	Artist	Song
January 1	Backstreet Boys	Shape Of My Heart
January 8	Backstreet Boys	Shape Of My Heart
January 15	Backstreet Boys	Shape Of My Heart
January 22	LeAnn Rimes	Can't Fight The Moonlight
January 29	A1 (group)	Same Old Brand New You
February 5	Robbie Williams	Better Man
February 12	Robbie Williams	Better Man
February 19	Limp Bizkit	Rollin
February 26	Limp Bizkit	Rollin
March 5	Jennifer Lopez	Love Dont Cost A Thing
March 12	Jennifer Lopez	Love Dont Cost A Thing
March 19	Ricky Martin ft Christina Aguilera	Nobody Wants To Be Lonely
March 26	Ricky Martin ft Christina Aguilera	Nobody Wants To Be Lonely
April 2	Westlife	I Lay My Love On You
April 9	Aerosmith	Jaded
April 16	Aerosmith	Jaded
April 23	Janet Jackson	All For You
April 30	Janet Jackson	All For You
May 7	Janet Jackson	All For You
May 14	Britney Spears	Don't Let Me Be The Last To Know
May 21	Robbie Williams	Let Love Be Your Energy
May 28	LeAnn Rimes	I Need You
June 4	Destiny's Child	Survivor
June 11	Destiny's Child	Survivor
June 18	Destiny's Child	Survivor
June 25	Destiny's Child	Survivor
July 2	Christina Aguilera, Lil' Kim, Mya, Pink	Lady Marmalade
July 9	Christina Aguilera, Lil' Kim, Mya, Pink	Lady Marmalade
July 16	U2	Elevation
July 23	Backstreet Boys	More Than That
July 30	Backstreet Boys	More Than That
August 6	*NSYNC	Pop
August 13	*NSYNC	Pop
August 20	*NSYNC	Pop
August 27	*NSYNC	Pop
September 3	Westlife	When Youre Looking Like That
September 10	Gorillaz	Tomorrow Comes Today
September 17	Gorillaz	Tomorrow Comes Today
September 24	Gorillaz	Tomorrow Comes Today
October 1	A1	One More Try
October 8	A1	One More Try
October 15	The Corrs	All The Love In The World
October 22	The Corrs	All The Love In The World
October 29	Michael Jackson	You Rock My World
November 5	Michael Jackson	You Rock My World
November 12	Britney Spears	Im A Slave 4 U
November 19	Britney Spears	Im A Slave 4 U
November 26	Destiny's Child	Emotion
December 3	Enrique Iglesias	Hero
December 10	Enrique Iglesias	Hero
December 17	Enrique Iglesias	Hero
Year End	*NSYNC	Pop

2002

Week	Artist	Song
January 21	No Doubt	Hey Baby
January 28	No Doubt	Hey Baby
April 1	Kylie Minogue	In Your Eyes
April 8	Britney Spears	I'm Not A Girl Not Yet A Woman
June 2	No Doubt	Hella Good
July 15	Eminem	Without Me
November 11	Sugababes	Round Round
November 18	Sugababes	Round Round
November 25	Justin Timberlake	Like I Love You
Year End	Ronan Keating	If Tomorrow Never Comes

2003

Week	Artist	Song
January 4	Missy Elliott	Work It
January 11	Missy Elliott	Work It
January 18	Jennifer Lopez ft P. Styles Jadakiss	Jenny From The Block
January 25	Jennifer Lopez ft P. Styles Jadakiss	Jenny From The Block
February 1	Mariah Carey	Through The Rain
February 8	Robbie Williams	Feel
February 15	Robbie Williams	Feel
February 22	Matchbox Twenty	Disease
March 1	Matchbox Twenty	Disease
March 8	Elton John ft Blue	Sorry Seems To Be The Hardest Word
March 15	Elton John ft Blue	Sorry Seems To Be The Hardest Word
March 22	Avril Lavigne	I'm With You
March 29	Jennifer Lopez ft LL Cool J	All I Have
April 5	Jennifer Lopez ft LL Cool J	All I Have
April 12	Jennifer Lopez ft LL Cool J	All I Have
April 19	Coldplay	Clocks
April 26	Coldplay	Clocks
May 3	Linkin Park	Somewhere I Belong
May 10	Linkin Park	Somewhere I Belong
May 17	Linkin Park	Somewhere I Belong
May 24	Linkin Park	Somewhere I Belong
May 31	Justin Timberlake	Rock Your Body
July 27	Stacie Orrico	Stuck
August 22	Christina Aguilera ft Lil' Kim	Can't Hold Us Down
August 29	Justin Timberlake	Senorita

2004

2005

Week	Artist	Song
January 1	Gwen Stefani	What You Waiting For
January 8	Destiny's Child	Lose My Breath
January 15	Jay-Z ft Linkin Park	Numb / Encore
January 22	Jay-Z ft Linkin Park	Numb / Encore
January 29	Maroon 5	Sunday Morning
February 5	Maroon 5	Sunday Morning
February 12	Maroon 5	Sunday Morning
February 19	Good Charlotte	I Just Wanna Live
February 26	Kelly Clarkson	Since U Been Gone
March 5	Kelly Clarkson	Since U Been Gone
March 12	Green Day	Boulevard Of Broken Dreams
March 19	Green Day	Boulevard Of Broken Dreams
March 26	Green Day	Boulevard Of Broken Dreams
April 2	50 Cent ft Olivia	Candy Shop
April 9	50 Cent ft Olivia	Candy Shop
April 16	50 Cent ft Olivia	Candy Shop
April 23	50 Cent ft Olivia	Candy Shop
April 30	Mariah Carey	It's Like That
May 7	Mariah Carey	It's Like That
May 14	Mariah Carey	It's Like That
May 21	Mariah Carey	It's Like That
May 28	Rob Thomas	Lonely No More
June 4	Rob Thomas	Lonely No More
