= Runaway Bride (film) =

1999 film by Garry Marshall

- Theatrical release poster
- Directed by: Garry Marshall
- Written by: Sara Parriott; Josann McGibbon
- Produced by: Ted Field; Tom Rosenberg; Scott Kroopf; Robert Cort
- Starring: Julia Roberts; Richard Gere; Joan Cusack; Héctor Elizondo; Rita Wilson; Paul Dooley
- Cinematography: Stuart Dryburgh
- Edited by: Bruce Green
- Music by: James Newton Howard
- Production companies: Interscope Communications; Lakeshore Entertainment
- Distributed by: Paramount Pictures (United States and Canada); Buena Vista International (International) (Note: Distributed under the Touchstone Pictures banner.)
- Release date: July 30, 1999 (United States)
- Running time: 116 minutes
- Country: United States
- Language: English
- Budget: $70 million
- Box office: $309.5 million

Runaway Bride is a 1999 American screwball romantic comedy film directed by Garry Marshall, and starring Julia Roberts and Richard Gere. The screenplay, written by Sara Parriott and Josann McGibbon, is about a reporter (Gere) who undertakes to write a story about a woman (Roberts) who has left a string of fiancés at the altar.

The film marked the first re-teaming of Gere, Roberts, Marshall, and Hector Elizondo following 1990's Pretty Woman. Runaway Bride was released on July 30, 1999, by Paramount Pictures in the United States and Canada and by Buena Vista International through the Touchstone Pictures banner in international markets. Though the film received generally negative reviews from critics, it was a commercial success, grossing $309 million worldwide.

== Plot ==
Spirited Maggie Carpenter has left three fiancés at the altar on their wedding day, earning local notoriety and the nickname "the Runaway Bride". Misanthropic New York City columnist Ike Graham writes an unflattering article about Maggie after hearing her story from a man he fails to realize is one of her bitter ex-fiancés. Ike's story is riddled with errors causing Maggie to send a scathing rebuttal to the newspaper, which ultimately results in Ike being fired.

However, his boss offers him another chance by writing an in-depth, truthful article about Maggie, if only to prove she actually is a heartless "man-eater". He travels to Hale, Maryland, where Maggie works at her family's hardware store and also makes designer lamps from spare industrial parts. Her fourth groom-to-be is high school football coach Bob Kelly. Bob is very much into sports psychology, constantly asking Maggie to "visualize" their upcoming wedding.

Ike follows Maggie around town and interviews her friends, family, and former fiancés. Annoyed by his intrusive questioning of those around her, she allows him one-on-one time with her to prove she is a good person. During this period, Ike and Maggie grow closer, using each other's insights to better understand themselves.

At a pre-wedding luau celebration, Ike defends Maggie from her family and guests when they begin teasing her about her past weddings. Deeply embarrassed, Maggie leaves the party. When Ike follows her outside and confronts her, he points out that she blindly adopts the preferences of whoever she is dating, explicitly noting that her choice of how she likes her eggs cooked changes with every fiancé. In response, she calls out his cynicism, suggesting he uses his column to mock others because he fears pursuing a meaningful life.

At the wedding rehearsal, Bob wants Maggie to practice his "visualization" techniques and asks Ike to stand in as the groom while he directs them. When Bob gives the cue "you may kiss the bride", they share a passionate kiss and admit their feelings for each other. Furious, Bob punches Ike and storms out. Afterwards, Ike proposes that since a wedding has already been arranged, he and Maggie should marry, to which Maggie agrees.

The wedding draws significant media attention. Bob advises Ike to maintain eye contact with Maggie to reassure her as she walks down the aisle. While that initially works, a camera flash temporarily blinds Ike, breaking Maggie's concentration. She gets cold feet and flees the church. Ike pursues her, but she jumps onto a passing FedEx truck. Heartbroken, Ike returns to New York.

In the following weeks, Maggie focuses on self-discovery, sampling different egg dishes to determine her true favorite and selling her artisan lamps in New York City shops. One night, Ike returns to his apartment and finds Maggie there. She explains she ran from her previous weddings because the men did not know who she truly was, partly due to her conforming to their personalities and preferences. She ran from Ike because she did not understand herself. Maggie symbolically gives her running shoes to Ike, then proposes to him by reciting the words he had shared with her back in Maryland.

The two marry in a private hillside ceremony, forgoing the big wedding that Maggie never actually wanted. The newlyweds ride away on horseback as their friends and family celebrate.

In a post-credit scene, Maggie and Ike play together in the snow, revealing that their marriage is still going strong.

== Cast ==
- Julia Roberts as Margaret "Maggie" Carpenter, a woman who has run away from three of her former weddings but is hoping not to do so on her fourth attempt to marry
- Richard Gere as Homer Eisenhower "Ike" Graham, a New York City news reporter who writes a misinformed article about Maggie and later falls in love with her
- Joan Cusack as Peggy Flemming, Maggie's best friend and co-worker at beauty salon. She is married to Cory Flemming, the town's radio announcer.
- Héctor Elizondo as Fisher, Ike's boss who has since married Ike's ex-wife Ellie
- Rita Wilson as Ellie Graham, Ike's ex-wife and editor. She later marries Ike's boss Fisher.
- Paul Dooley as Walter Carpenter, Maggie's widowed father who owns a hardware store
- Christopher Meloni as Bob Kelly, Maggie's current fiancé who coaches high school football
- Donal Logue as Father Brian Norris, the second groom Maggie left at the altar. He later became a priest.
- Reg Rogers as George "Bug Guy" Swilling, the third groom Maggie left at the altar
- Yul Vazquez as "Dead Head" Gill Chavez, the first groom Maggie left at the altar. He is a musician and car mechanic.
- Jane Morris as Mrs. Pressman
- Lisa Roberts Gillan as Elaine, Ellie's secretary from Manhattan
- Kathleen Marshall as Cousin Cindy, Maggie's unmarried cousin
- Jean Schertler as Grandma Julia Carpenter, Maggie's grandmother and Walter's mother. She is an avid runner.
- Sela Ward as pretty woman in bar
- Linda Larkin as Lydia, Gill's girlfriend
- Garry Marshall as softball first baseman (uncredited)
- Laurie Metcalf as Betty Trout (uncredited)
- Larry Miller as Kevin, New York bartender (uncredited)

== Production ==
The film was in development for over a decade with different actors attached at various times: Anjelica Huston, Mary Steenburgen, Lorraine Bracco, Geena Davis, Demi Moore, Sandra Bullock, Ellen DeGeneres, Téa Leoni (for the role of Maggie); Christopher Walken, Harrison Ford, Mel Gibson, Michael Douglas (for the role of Ike) and Ben Affleck (for the role of Bob). Director Michael Hoffman was attached.

Writers Elaine May and Leslie Dixon did unused rewrites.

Much of the film production took place in and around historic Berlin, Maryland, which was made over to become the fictitious town of Hale, Maryland. Main Street in Berlin as well as some of the landmarks such as the Atlantic Hotel were left nearly as-is during production, while some of the business signage on Main Street was changed.

Coco Lee performed the theme song, "Before I Fall in Love."

== Release ==
=== Box office ===
The film premiered on July 30, 1999, with $12 million on its opening day. In its opening weekend, the film peaked at #1 with $35.1 million. The film would hold the record for having the highest opening weekend for a Julia Roberts film until 2001 when Ocean's Eleven took it.

By the end of its run, the film had grossed $152.3 million in the United States and Canada. Achieving an international gross of $157.2 million, it altogether made $309.5 million worldwide.

=== Critical response ===
Runaway Bride received mixed reviews upon release. On the review aggregator website Rotten Tomatoes, 45% of 86 critics' reviews are positive, with an average rating of 5.4/10. The website's consensus reads: "Cliché story with lack of chemistry between Richard Gere and Julia Roberts." Metacritic, which uses a weighted average, assigned the film a score of 39 out of 100, based on 33 critics, indicating "generally unfavorable" reviews. Audiences polled by CinemaScore gave the film an average grade of "A−" on an A+ to F scale.

The Los Angeles Times wrote: "Runaway Bride's Josann McGibbon & Sara Parriott script is so muddled and contrived, raising issues only to ignore them or throw them away, you wonder why so many people embraced it." Roger Ebert of the Chicago Sun-Times gave the film 2/4 stars, saying: "After seeing Gere and Roberts play much smarter people (even in romantic comedies), it is painful to see them dumbed down here. The screenplay is so sluggish, they're like Derby winners made to carry extra weight." The New York Times said: "More often, the film is like a ride through a car wash: forward motion, familiar phases in the same old order and a sense of being carried along steadily on a well-used track. It works without exactly showing signs of life."

== Soundtrack ==
No.	Title	Writer(s)	Performing Artist	Length
1.	"I Still Haven't Found What I'm Looking For"	David Howell Evans; Paul David Hewson; Adam Clayton; Larry Mullen Jr.	U2	4:40
2.	"Ready to Run"	Marcus Hummon; Martie Seidel	Dixie Chicks	3:52
3.	"I Love You"	Adrienne Follesé; Tammy Hyler; Keith Follesé	Martina McBride	2:54
4.	"Maneater"	Daryl Hall; John Oates; Sara Allen	Hall & Oates	4:32
5.	"From My Head to My Heart"	Dave Bassett; Evan Lowenstein; Jaron Lowenstein	Evan and Jaron	3:13
6.	"Blue Eyes Blue"	Diane Warren	Eric Clapton	4:42
7.	"And That's What Hurts"	Desmond Child; Ty Lacy	Hall & Oates	4:03
8.	"Never Saw Blue Like That"	Tom Kimmel; Mark Luna; Jeff Franzel	Shawn Colvin	4:39
9.	"You Can't Hurry Love"	Brian Holland; Lamont Dozier; Eddie Holland	Dixie Chicks	3:07
10.	"You Sang to Me"	Marc Anthony; Cory Rooney	Marc Anthony	5:26
11.	"You're the Only One for Me"	Carsten Schack; Dwayne Richardson; Kenneth Karlin	Allure	4:04
12.	"Before I Fall in Love"	Dave Deviller; Sean Hosein; Allan Rich; Dorothy Gazeley	CoCo Lee	3:44
13.	"Where Were You (On Our Wedding Day)?"	Lloyd Price; John Patton; Harold Logan	Billy Joel	1:59
14.	"It Never Entered My Mind"	Richard Rodgers; Lorenz Hart	Miles Davis	4:02
Total length:				54:57

=== Notes ===
- The soundtrack peaked at No. 4 on the Billboard 200 Charts on August 20, 1999.
- Track information and credits verified from Discogs, AllMusic, and the album's liner notes.

=== Certifications ===
Region	Certification	Certified units/sales
Canada (Music Canada)	Platinum	100,000^{^}
United States (RIAA)	Platinum	1,000,000^{^}
^{^} Shipments figures based on certification alone.
