= Coco Lee =

Hong Kong American singer (1975–2023)

CoCo Lee
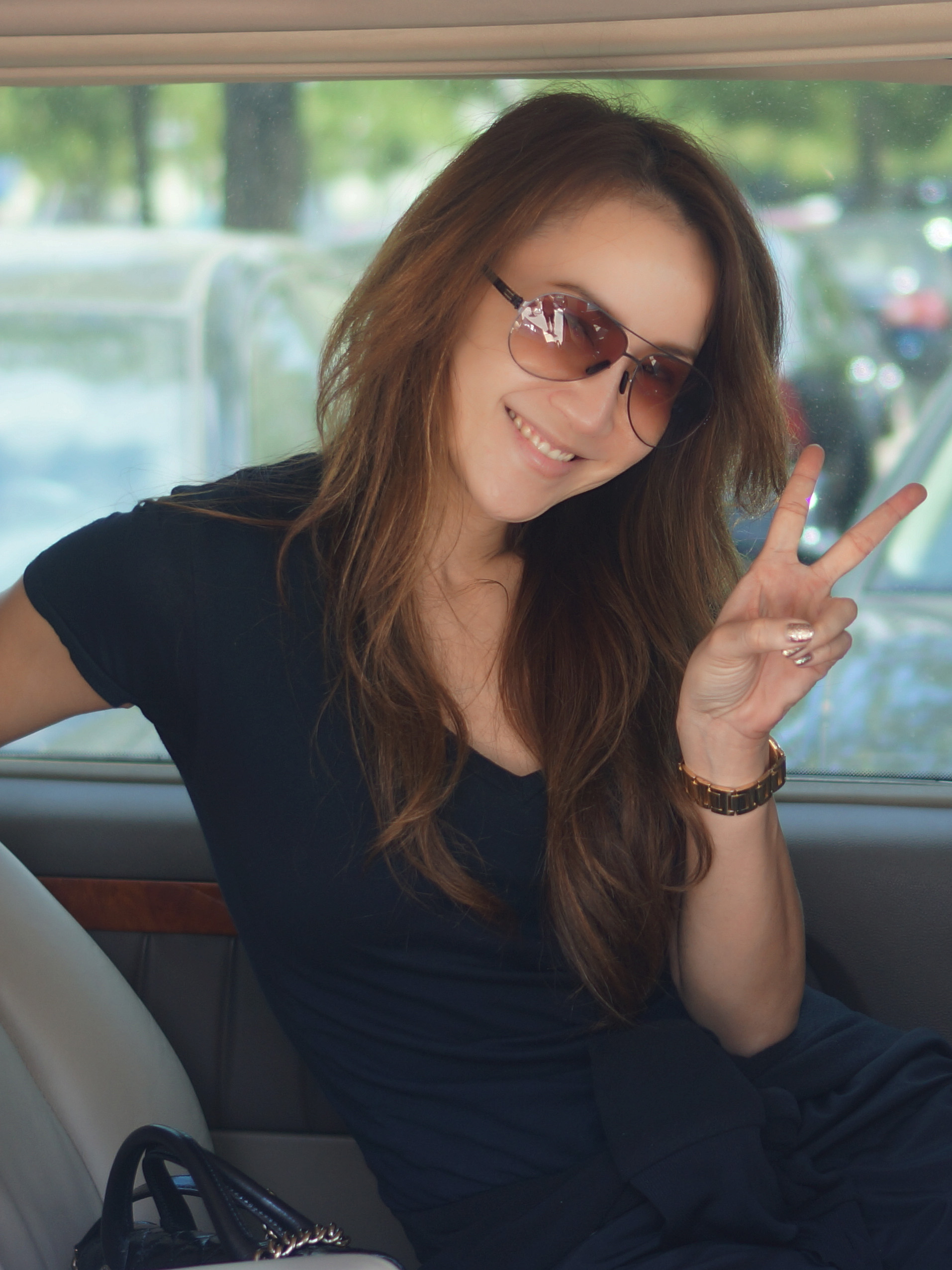
- Lee in 2013
- Born: Ferren Lee; 17 January 1975; British Hong Kong
- Died: 5 July 2023 (aged 48); Pok Fu Lam, Southern District, Hong Kong
- Resting place: Shimenfeng Memorial Park, Wuchang District, Wuhan, China
- Citizenship: United States; China
- Education: University of California, Irvine (dropped out)
- Occupations: Singer; songwriter; dancer; actress; director; record producer; businesswoman
- Years active: 1993–2023
- Spouse: Bruce Rockowitz (m. 2011)
- Musical career
- Origin: Hong Kong; Taiwan; San Francisco; New York City
- Genres: Pop; C-pop; dance-pop; R&B; hip-hop
- Labels: Capital Artists; Fancy Pie; Sony Music; 550 Music; Epic; Sony BMG; Warner Music Group; Universal Music Group

Chinese name
- Chinese: 李玟
Transcriptions
Standard Mandarin
- Hanyu Pinyin: Lǐ Wén
Yue: Cantonese
- Jyutping: Lei5 Man4

Birth name
- Chinese: 李美林
Transcriptions
Standard Mandarin
- Hanyu Pinyin: Lǐ Měilín
Yue: Cantonese
- Jyutping: Lei5 Mei5-lam4
- Website: cocolee.com

CoCo Lee (Chinese: 李玟; 17 January 1975 – 5 July 2023) was a Chinese-American singer, songwriter, and actress. She was one of the best-selling artists in Asia. Her career began in 1993 in Hong Kong, and she later gained prominence in Taiwan through a series of commercially successful albums. In 2000 she expanded her career to the United States, Canada, Europe, Australia and New Zealand, becoming one of the earliest Asian singers to establish a presence across multiple international markets. She released 18 studio albums, 2 live records, and 5 compilations.

Lee, who was described as the "Asian Mariah Carey", was noted for her Americanized dance routines. She voiced the lead character of Fa Mulan in the Mandarin version of the 1998 Disney film Mulan and sang its theme song, "Reflection".

Lee was the first Chinese singer to have music released globally, making her the first Chinese singer to break into the western market. Her 1999 album Just No Other Way was the first ever English-language album recorded by a Chinese singer. Her 2000 single "Do You Want My Love" achieved international success, appearing on the US Billboard Hot Dance Breakouts Chart at No. 4 and entering the top 50 of the US Billboard Dance Club Songs Chart while also peaking at No. 14 on the Australian Singles Chart and No. 20 on the Official Chart in New Zealand.

Her 2000 song "A Love Before Time", from the film Crouching Tiger, Hidden Dragon, was nominated for the Academy Award for Best Original Song, and she performed it at the 73rd Academy Awards, becoming the first, and so far only, Chinese artist to perform at the Oscars. Lee was also the first Asian-American singer to sing the US National Anthem at an NBA game, the first Asian singer to hold a concert at the Walt Disney Concert Hall in Los Angeles, the first non-mainland Chinese singer to win the Chinese singing reality show I Am a Singer, and the first Asian brand ambassador for Chanel. In her final years, Lee struggled with health problems, having been diagnosed with depression in 2019. She died by suicide in Hong Kong in 2023, aged 48.

== Early life ==
Ferren Lee was born on 17 January 1975 in Hong Kong or Wuhan. She was a posthumous child, as her father had died before her birth due to an illness. Lee had physical defects in her left leg, causing lifelong challenges. After her husband's death, Lee's mother moved the family to Hong Kong to seek support from relatives. They faced difficult times there before emigrating to the US when Lee was nine years old. Lee had two elder sisters, Carol and Nancy, the latter of whom would become Lee's manager early in her career. Growing up in San Francisco, Lee attended Redding Elementary School, Presidio Middle School, and Raoul Wallenberg Traditional High School. She won Miss Teen Chinatown San Francisco in 1991.

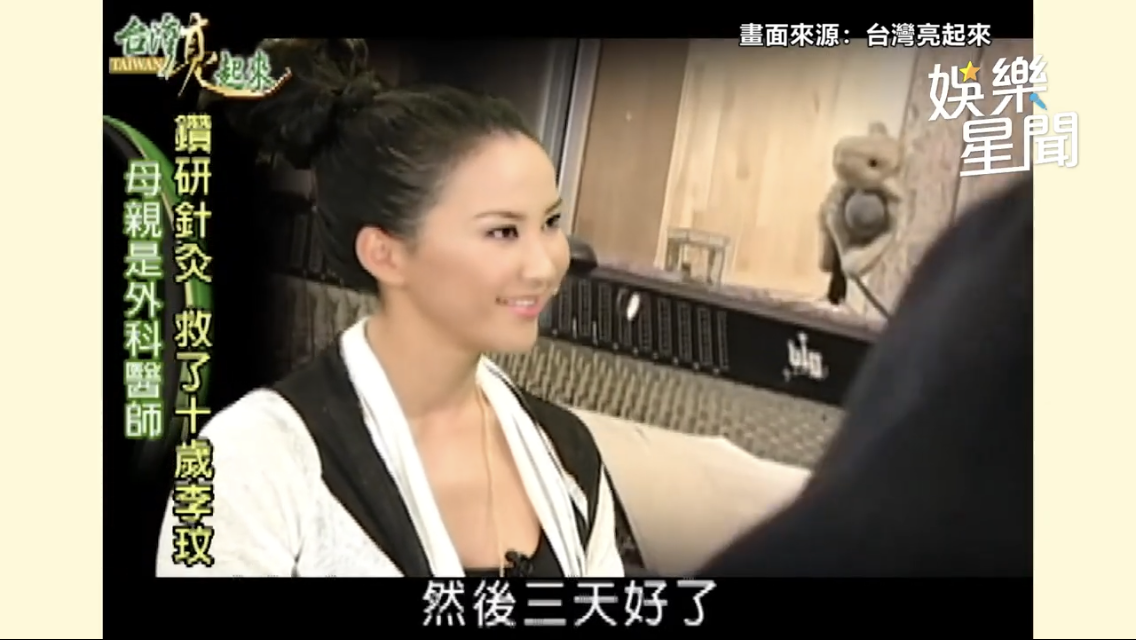
Lee during a 2007 interview

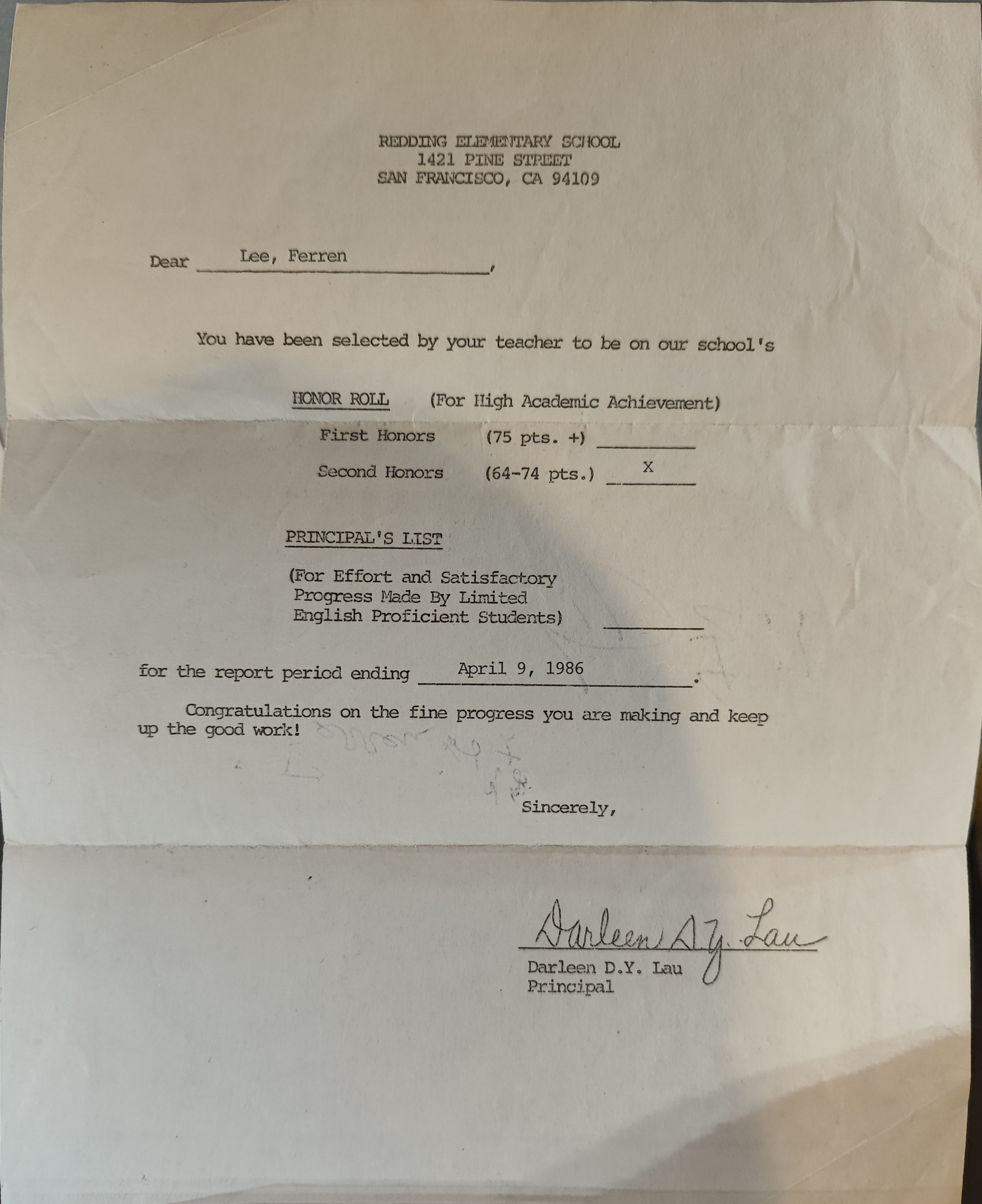
Lee's Redding Elementary School Diploma

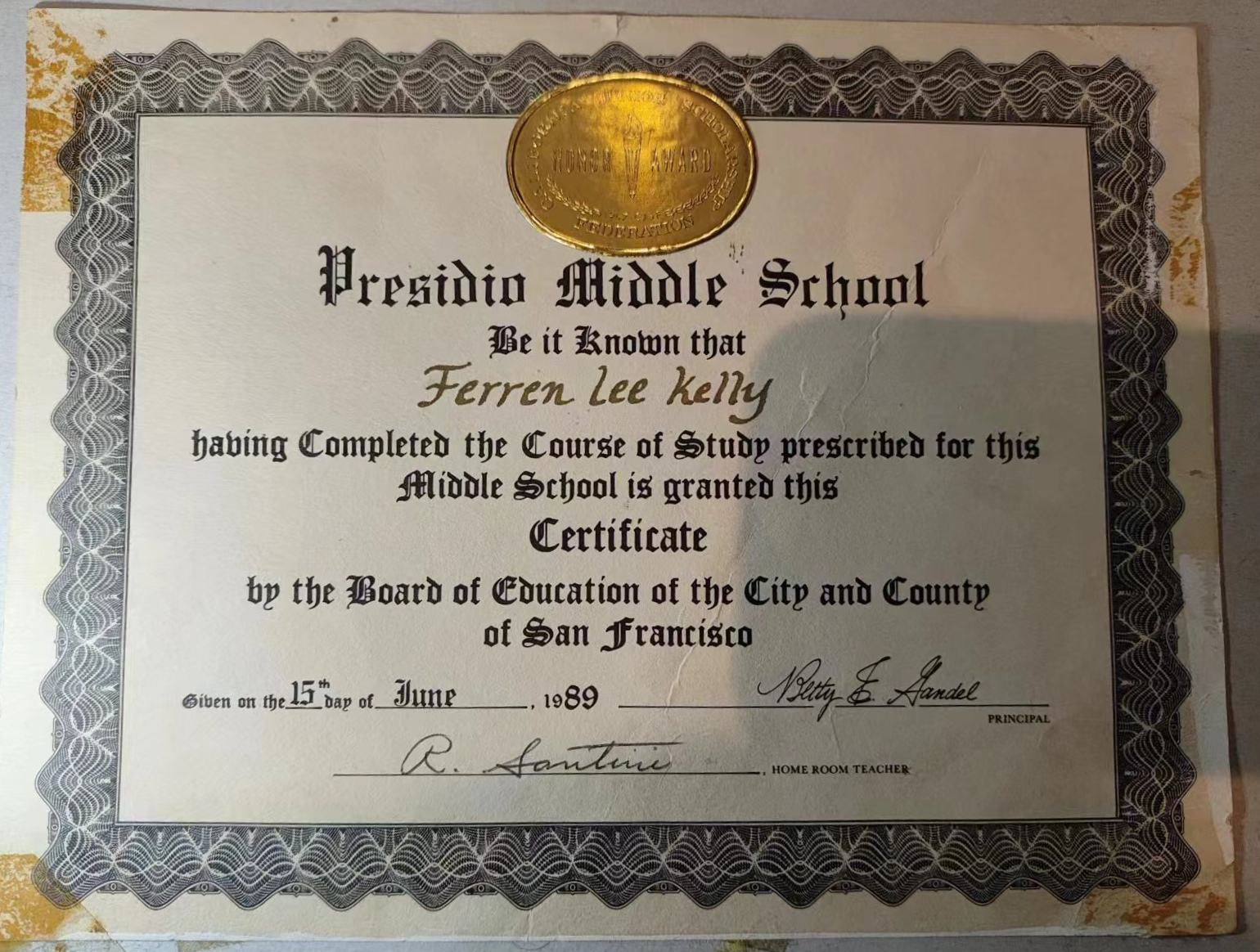
Lee's Presidio Middle School Diploma

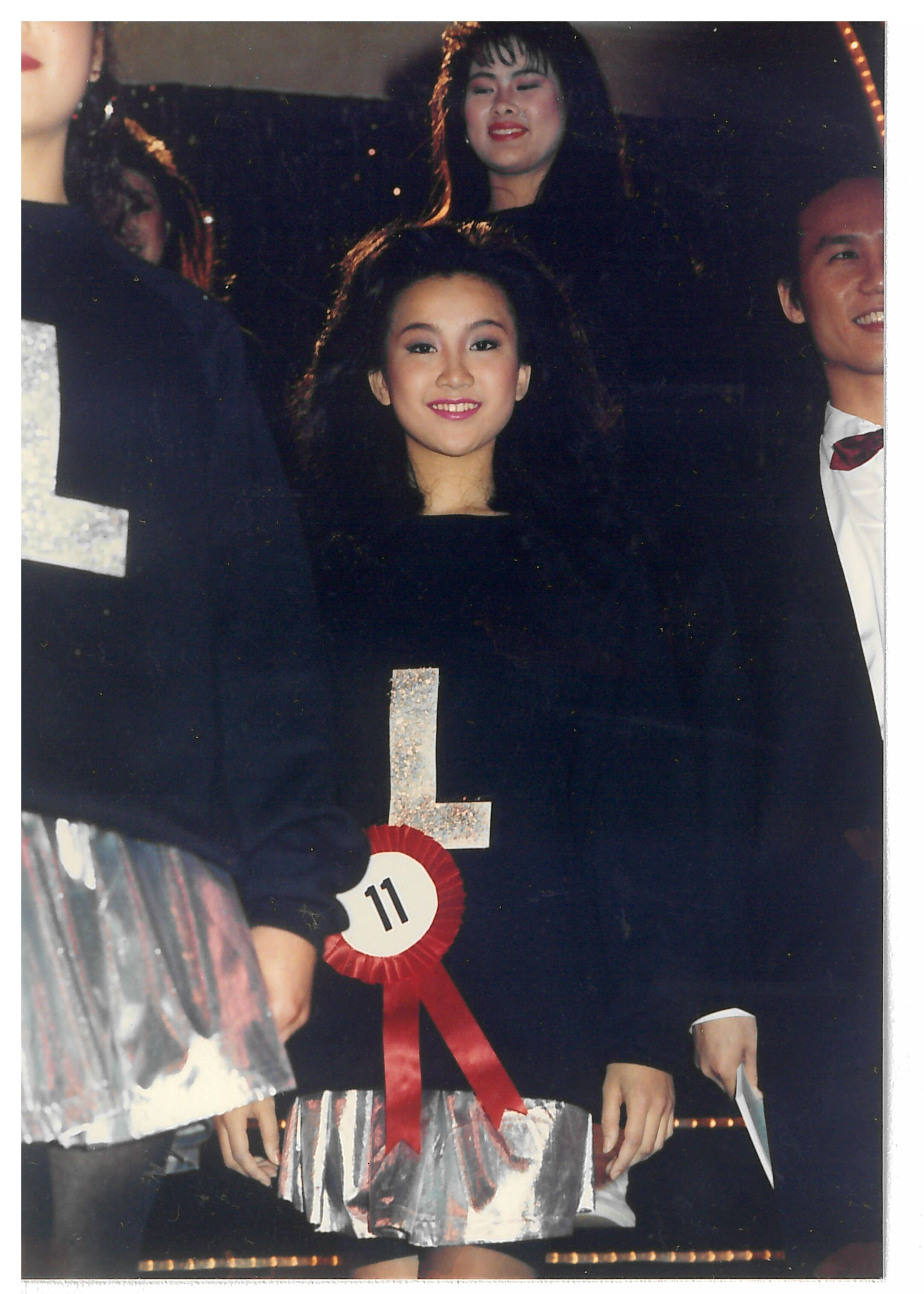
Lee at the Miss Teen Chinatown Gala, 1991, with BD Wong

At the age of 17, Lee won a local singing contest twice. After graduating from high school in 1993, she entered a TVB competition in Hong Kong and was offered a recording contract. She attempted to juggle her singing career in Hong Kong with her pre-medical studies at the University of California, Irvine, but she eventually left school after one year. During an interview in 1997, Lee said she had never intended to become a star. Her goal in life had been to become a surgeon, following in her mother's footsteps.

== Career ==
=== Beginnings and Sony Music: 1993–1998 ===
In 1993, Lee returned to Hong Kong to visit her sisters. While there, she took part in the 12th annual New Talent Singing Awards and was the first runner-up, singing Whitney Houston's Run to You. The following day, Capital Artists offered her a recording contract.

When she was 18, Lee came to Taiwan to start her music career. Advised by her sister, Lee chose "Coco" as her English stage name and "Li Wen" (李玟) as her Chinese stage name.

She made her debut on compilation albums such as Red Hot Hits '93 Autumn Edition (zh). In 1994, she released her first solo albums in Mandarin in Taiwan, Love from Now On and Promise Me, through Fancy Pie Records. Her English-language cover album Brave Enough to Love and her third Mandarin album, Woman in Love, came out the following year.

In 1996, Lee signed with Sony Music Entertainment. Her next Mandarin album, CoCo Lee, became the best-selling record in Asia that year. She subsequently released another English cover album, CoCo's Party, also in 1996. The following year, she issued the Mandarin album Each Time I Think of You as well as a Cantonese record, COCO, the only one she ever recorded in that language. In 1998, her Mandarin album Di Da Di Hints came out, selling one million copies in less than three months.

=== International collaborations and English debut: 1998–2005 ===
From Lee's next album, Sunny Day Feelin' Good, the track "Colors of the World" was used for the opening of the 1998 FIFA World Cup, and "The Answer" (答案) was featured in the Chinese movie Bishonen. In 1998, Lee was hired by Walt Disney Pictures to sing the theme song "Reflection" (自己; translation: "myself") and voice Fa Mulan in the Mandarin version of Mulan (花木蘭). The same year, she sang "Missing You in 365 Days" (zh), one of the theme songs of the film Lotus Lantern, the first commercial animated feature film in mainland China.

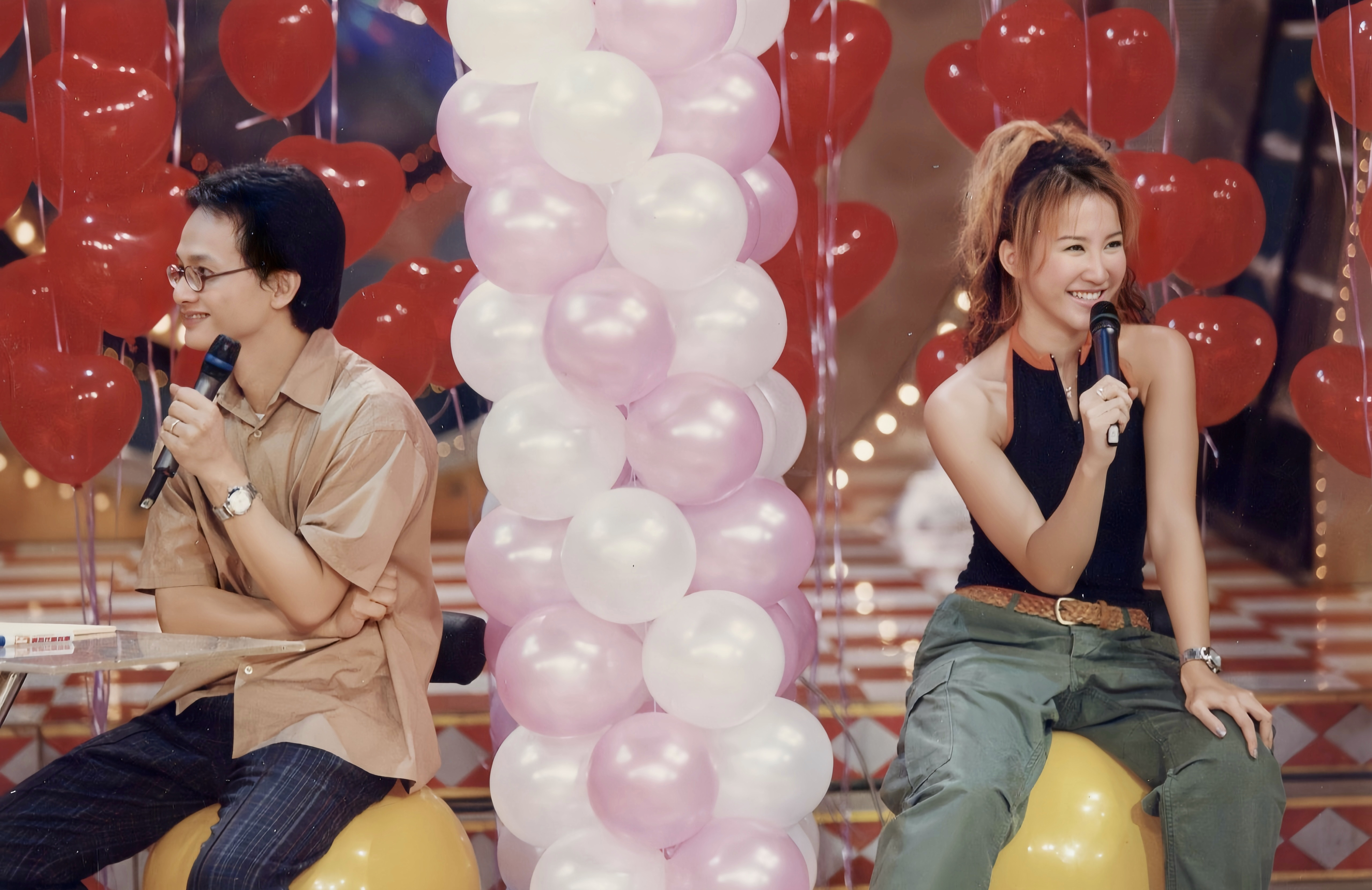
Lee and Chien Yao on "Happy 9/歡樂龍虎榜" at CTS, 1998.

In August 1998, Lee performed in Taiwan to an audience of more than 50,000 fans. The next year, she performed in a "Michael Jackson and friends" charity concert and later released the Mandarin album From Today Till Forever. Later that year, under 550 Music, she released her first English album of original songs, titled Just No Other Way, which included the hit "Do You Want My Love". The song reached No. 4 on the US Billboard Hot Dance Breakouts chart in December, making Lee the first Chinese singer to break into the American market. Her love song "Before I Fall in Love" was included in the soundtrack to the movie Runaway Bride. She also recorded the duet "Can't Get Over" with Kelly Price. In Asia, she released the Mandarin album True Lover You & Me. By 2000, she had released 20 albums in Asia and sold 7.5 million copies of her records on that continent.

In 2001, Lee sang the song "A Love Before Time" for the movie Crouching Tiger, Hidden Dragon, which she performed at the Oscars. The track was introduced by the actress Julia Stiles as an "evocative love ballad" that combined "the flavor and texture of Eastern music with the orchestral color and sensitive lyrics of Western culture". Lee's next album, Promise, was released in October 2001 and included a Mandarin cover song titled "Baby, I'm Sorry" (Baby 對不起). The track placed at No. 35 on the Taiwan Yearly Singles Top 100 chart that year. In 2002, Lee released the remix album D. Is Coco (Dance Is Coco). She also sang an anti-tobacco song called "From the Beginning 'til the End" (煙絲萬縷) with singer Jacky Cheung. The same year, at the NBA debut of Yao Ming, Lee performed the US national anthem and became the first Chinese-American singer to sing at an NBA game. She also sang the anti-racism song "A Dream of One" with Korean singer Park Jin-young. In 2003, she performed with Shaggy at the MTV Asia Awards in Singapore and also hosted the show with him. Lee recorded the charity singles "Hand in Hand" for SARS with other artists, including Wang Leehom, Stefanie Sun, Elva Hsiao, and Jolin Tsai.

Lee co-starred in the Chinese comedy movie Master of Everything (自娱自乐) with John Lone, which won the Best Foreign Film award at the 2005 Beverly Hills Film Festival.

=== Second English album and Warner Music: 2005–2011 ===
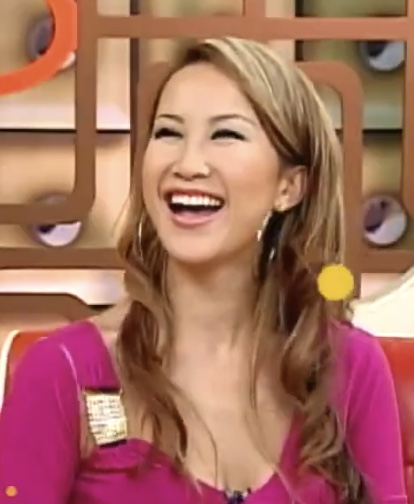
Lee interviewed in 2006

In 2005, Sony BMG released Lee's second English album, Exposed. It was banned in mainland China for "sexy" lyrics in a few songs, such as "Touch" and "So Good". Lee's next Mandarin album, Just Want You, came out on 22 September 2006. In 2008, she was chosen to sing one of the Summer Olympics songs, "Forever Friends", alongside Sun Nan.

As the first Asian singer to perform at the Walt Disney Concert Hall in Los Angeles, Lee had a solo concert there in July 2009, singing some of Michael Jackson's songs in homage to her idol. On 14 August 2009, she released a new Mandarin album, East to West, with Warner Music Group. It includes the song "Turn" (流轉), which was on the soundtrack to the film The Legend of Silk Boy. Lee also recorded the song "Smile Shanghai" (微笑上海), with artists including JJ Lin, Andy Lau, Jam Hsiao, and Jane Zhang, for the Shanghai World Expo 2010. On 27 March 2010, she began her East2West World Tour at Taipei Arena, in Taiwan. She performed at the Encore Theatre in Wynn Casino in Las Vegas on 3 and 4 July, then at the Singapore Indoor Stadium on 2 October and in Nanning on 16 December. In March 2011, Lee was one of many artists who participated in the recording of the Artistes 311 Love Beyond Borders official theme song, "Succumb Not to Sorrow" (不要輸給心痛), on the Cantonese version. On 7 April 2011, her song "Dreams on Oriental Seas" (梦在东方的海上), featuring Sun Nan, was broadcast. It was named as the theme for the 14th FINA World Championships, which took place in Shanghai on 16 July.

=== New album and final projects before death: 2011–2023 ===
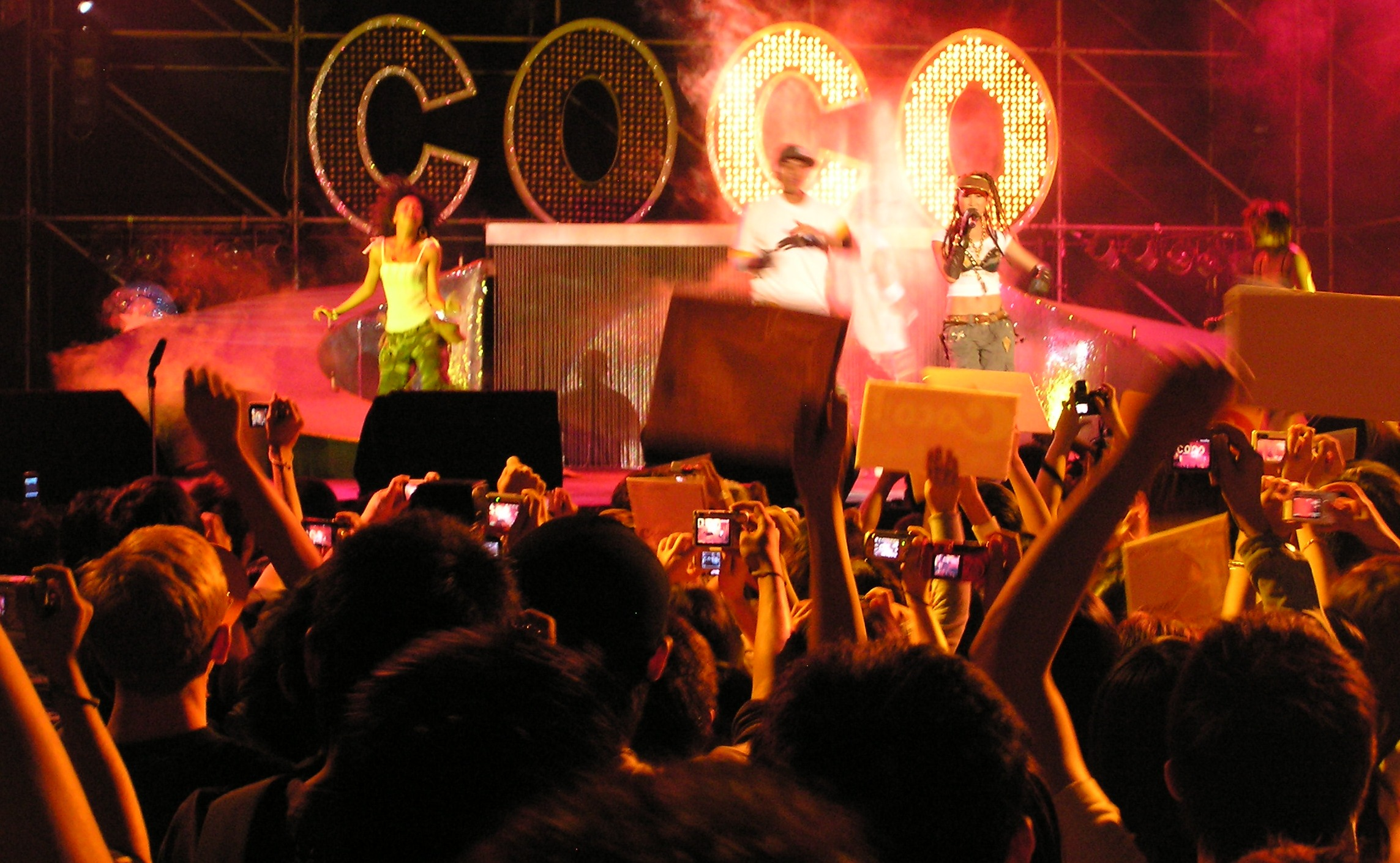
Lee (third from left), performing "Hip Hop Tonight"

On 8 June 2011, Lee announced that she had set up her own recording studio. On 25 June, her song "Four Seas Alliance" (四海盟約), the theme for the 2011 China television drama All Men are Brothers, was broadcast. On 17 December, she performed at the Booey Lehoo Concert in Beijing with will.i.am and apl.de.ap from the Black Eyed Peas as well as with John Legend and Shunza. On 9 February 2012, she performed at the TRANS4M Boyle Heights benefit at Hollywood Palladium in Los Angeles, with will.i.am, apl.de.ap, and Taboo.

Her next album, Illuminate, was released on 31 May 2013 by Universal Music. She was a judge on the 2015 version of Dancing with the Stars in China.

In 2016, Lee competed in the fourth season of the Chinese reality show I Am a Singer, where she admitted that losing her voice to bronchitis in 2014 had affected her singing ability. Regardless, she went on to win the competition, making her the first non-mainland Chinese singer to do so. She later returned as a guest singer for two more seasons: in the fifth season, during the biennial concert, and in the sixth as a guest performer for Jessie J, the eventual winner of that season. In 2020, she announced that she was going to re-record the Mandarin end-credits version of the song "Reflection" for the live adaptation of Mulan, as she had already done in 1998.

==== Sing! China disputes ====
In September 2022, Lee was a coach during season 7 of the show Sing! China where she questioned the fairness of the judges during the competition. In an audio recording that was later leaked after her death, she commented that the production team retaliated against her during the show's final episode. Lee, who was about to undergo surgery on her left leg, alleged that a sudden placement change caused her to stand alone in her heels and later fall during a duet. She described the experience as "humiliating", since her health issues had been largely concealed from the public. She also said that the production team refused to give her mentee Feige a chance to return to the stage unless Lee writes a specific Weibo post, to which she complied so that Feige could display his talent again. The show was subsequently pulled off air and investigated by Chinese authorities.

In January 2023, Lee was digitally animated using motion capture for the virtual reality interactive concert Millennium Realm (千禧之境) on the Pico VR video platform.

== Philanthropy ==
Lee was actively involved in the work of UNICEF as a youth ambassador, promoting children's rights and their well-being. She supported the Make-A-Wish Foundation, which grants children with critical illness their wishes. She was also an ambassador for the Organisation for World Peace in China, Cancer Fund's Pink Ambassador at Hong Kong's first breast cancer survivors' fashion show in 2016, and Youth AIDS ambassador at a global AIDS conference in Bangkok, Thailand, in 2004.

== Personal life ==
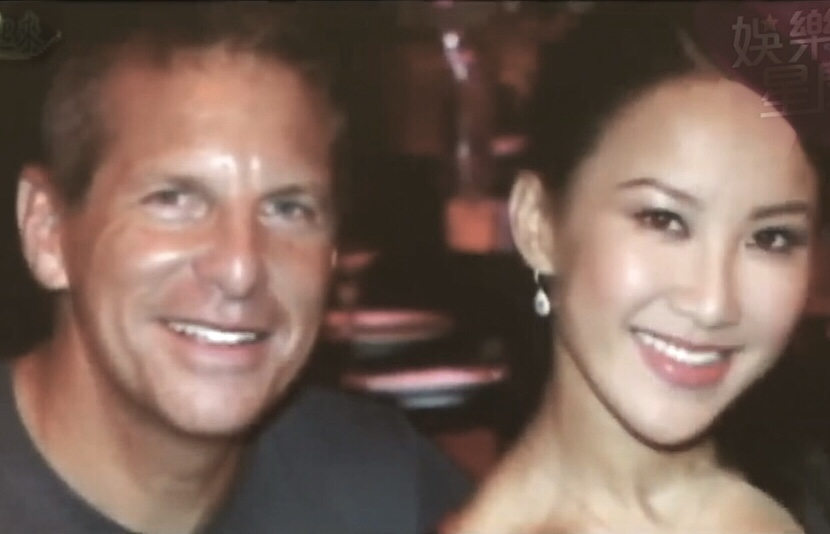
Lee and Bruce Rockowitz

=== Marriage ===
Lee married Hong Kong-based Canadian businessman Bruce Rockowitz on 27 October 2011 in a Jewish ceremony. The wedding included performances by Bruno Mars, Alicia Keys, and Ne-Yo. For her occasion, Lee recorded the song "I Just Wanna Marry U" (in both Chinese and English versions), which was released on 24 October 2011. In March 2018, she mentioned in a brand event that she was undergoing IVF in New York. Before she died, Lee had no biological children but had two stepdaughters from her husband's previous marriage.

In 2017, Rockowitz admitted to cheating on Lee. It has been reported that he continued to have affairs, which were known to friends and families. Lee experienced severe mental anguish as a result and attempted to file for divorce three times. Rockowitz denies that he continued having affairs. The couple had separated before Lee's death and were due to sign divorce papers in July 2023.

=== Health issues ===
Lee was born with an abnormality in her left leg. At the age of two, she underwent surgery, which failed to correct the problem, causing her to rely more heavily on her right leg for most of her life.

Lee received a diagnosis of depression in 2019. Her sister stated that the condition had deteriorated drastically in the few months before Lee's death, though she had sought professional help.

Lee was diagnosed with breast cancer in 2022 and had a tumor removed. In December, the singer reported her weight as 42 kg (92 lbs), sparking concerns for her health. On 8 March 2023, she disclosed on social media that she had had surgery on her pelvis and thigh in Hong Kong the previous month, after triggering an old leg injury during a dance rehearsal in October 2022. She shared videos of herself learning to walk again with the aid of a walker as well as a nurse. Lee had to take muscle relaxant medication after the surgery, an insider said.

== Death ==
Lee attempted suicide on 29 June 2023. She spent one night in a private hospital, before moving to her sisters' house at the Peak. She made another suicide attempt on 2 July and was taken to the hospital, where she died three days later, on 5 July, at the age of 48. News of her death received significant attention in China, getting almost 1.4 billion views on Weibo in one day.

Lee's family asked Hong Kong authorities to investigate her death, and an autopsy was requested to determine the cause.

=== Services and tributes ===
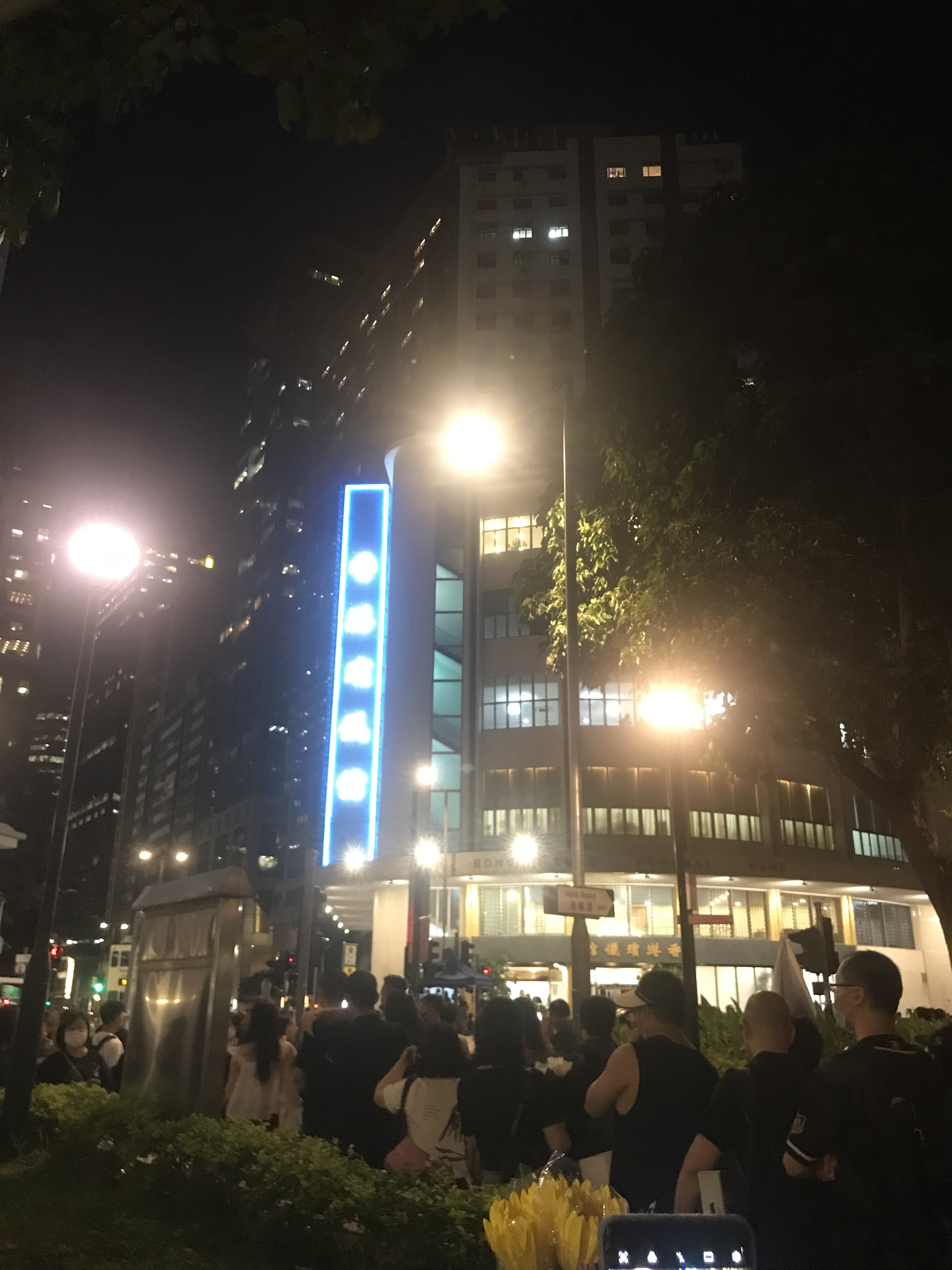
Fans queuing to enter a funeral hall to pay respects to the star, 31 July 2023

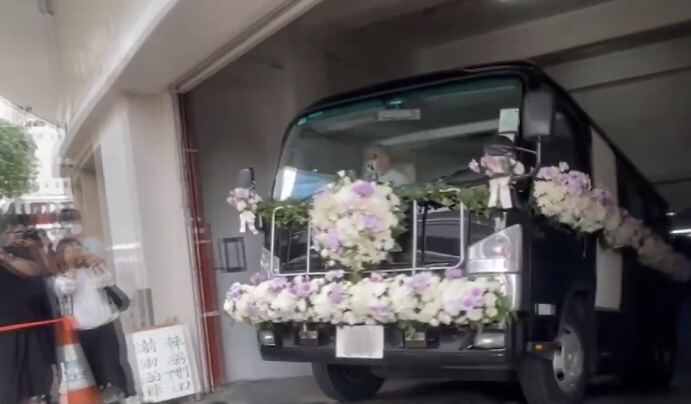
Hearse carrying Lee leaving Hong Kong Funeral Home, North Point, 1 August 2023

Lee's sister Nancy has urged the government of Hong Kong to officially recognize the star's contributions. A vigil for Lee was held on 31 July at Hong Kong Funeral Home in North Point, with a public memorial service. There were eight pallbearers at the funeral, including Lee's brother-in-law, singer Jenny Tseng, and lyricist and music producer Chien Yao. A private funeral service was held on 1 August.

Rockowitz's name was missing from multiple announcements made by Lee's sisters. It was reported that towards the end of the 31 July service, Nancy became emotional when hugging a friend and was heard shouting repeatedly in Cantonese: "He took my sister away!" Carol, the eldest sister, was also heard shouting: "She's saying he caused my sister to die!" Their cries did not name any person and lasted for some time, before the audio was muted. On 1 August, when asked to say something to Lee outside the crematorium, Rockowitz, who was being mobbed by the star's angry fans, said, "I love her. My whole life". Rockowitz came under criticism after Lee's death, and he has sought to dispel various allegations against him.

On 21 October 2023, Lee's ashes were buried at the Shimen Peak Memorial Park in Wuhan, China. According to one of her sisters, it was their mother's wish that the ashes of Lee, who had not met her father when she was little, be placed next to his.

== Artistry and legacy ==
CoCo is ... known to have worked tirelessly to open up a new world for Chinese singers in the international music scene, and she went all out to shine for the Chinese. We are proud of her!

We hope that everyone will not only miss Coco, but also share her bright smile, treat people with sincerity, convey kindness and love to everyone around us, and continue Coco's wish to let everyone around feel her love and happiness. Her rays of light will last forever.

— Lee's sisters, when announcing the news of her death on Facebook and Instagram, USA Today, SCMP

Lee was inspired by musicians such as Whitney Houston, Madonna, Michael Jackson, and Mariah Carey. Since techniques employed by R&B singers in English would change the pitch and meaning of words in Cantonese, she taught herself Mandarin, which allows for more tonal flexibility.

She was remembered by The New York Times as "a Chinese American singer and songwriter best known for performing an Oscar-nominated song in the hit film Crouching Tiger, Hidden Dragon". She is remembered by millennials who grew up during a time when Mandopop boomed and who enjoyed listening to her songs in English and Mandarin. She has been called the "Asian Mariah Carey" due to her impressive voice and dancing skills. She has also been credited for breaking down international barriers and bridging the gap between East Asia and the West.

== Awards and nominations ==
Name of the award ceremony, year presented, award category, nominee, and the result of the nomination
| Award ceremony | year | Category | Nominee / work | Result | Ref. |
|---|---|---|---|---|---|
| Asian Pop Music Awards | 2023 | Top 20 Songs of the Year – Chinese | "Battle Song" | Won | |
| Beijing Pop Music Awards | 2009 | Best Female Singer – Hong Kong and Taiwan | Coco Lee | Won | |
| CCTV-MTV Music Awards | 1999 | Best Female Singer in Taiwan | Coco Lee | Won | |
| CCTV-MTV Music Awards | 1999 | Breakthrough Innovation Award | Coco Lee | Won | |
| CCTV-MTV Music Awards | 2000 | Best International Female Vocalist | Coco Lee | Won | |
| CCTV-MTV Music Awards | 2002 | Asia's Most Outstanding Female Artist | Coco Lee | Won | |
| Changchun Film Festival | 2005 | Best Newcomer | Master of Everything | Nominated | |
| China Music Awards | 2014 | Most Stylish Singer in Asia | Coco Lee | Won | |
| China Music Awards | 2014 | Most Popular International Chinese Singer | Coco Lee | Won | |
| China Music Awards | 2019 | Most Influential Female Singer in Asia | Coco Lee | Won | |
| China Music Awards | 2019 | Most Popular International Chinese Singer | Coco Lee | Won | |
| Chinese Film Media Awards | 2005 | Best New Actor | Master of Everything | Nominated | |
| Global Chinese Music Awards | 2001 | Chinese Pop Hits of 2000 | "True Lover" | Won | |
| Global Chinese Music Awards | 2001 | Media Recommendation Award | "A Love Before Time" | Won | |
| Global Chinese Music Awards | 2001 | Best Stage Performance | Coco Lee | Won | |
| Golden Melody Awards | 1997 | Best Female World Singer | CoCo Lee | Nominated | |
| Golden Melody Awards | 1998 | Best Female Mandarin Singer | Each Time I Think of You | Nominated | |
| Lycra Style Awards | 2004 | Asian Style Artist | Coco Lee | Won | |
| MTV Video Music Awards | 1998 | International Viewer's Choice: MTV Mandarin | "Di Da Di" | Won | |
| New Talent Singing Awards | 1993 | —N/a | Coco Lee | Runner-up | |
| Tencent Music Entertainment Awards | 2024 | Best Animation Theme Song | "Battle Song" | Won | |
| Top Chinese Music Awards | 2001 | Female Pop Vocalist of the Year – Hong Kong and Taiwan | Coco Lee | Nominated | |
| Top Ten Chinese Gold Songs Award | 2000 | Top Ten Outstanding Artists | Coco Lee | Won | |
| Top Ten Chinese Gold Songs Award | 2001 | Top Ten Outstanding Artists | Coco Lee | Won | |

== Discography ==
=== Studio albums ===
| title | Release date | Label | language | Track listing |
|---|---|---|---|---|
| Love from Now On (愛就要趁現在) | 15 June 1994 | Fancy Pie Records | Mandarin | 1. I'm Still Your Lover (我依然是你的情人); 2. Just Right Here (就到這裡); 3. Can't Give You Tenderness (不能給你溫柔); 4. Weekend in Taipei (週末的台北); 5. Hard to Leave (難分難離) (feat. Cheung Shui-Chit 張瑞哲); 6. Meant to Be (前世今生); 7. Rose Garden (玫瑰園); 8. Love from Now On (愛就要趁現在); 9. Missing Your Love (想你的心想你的情); 10. Tonight (今晚) |
| Promise Me (答應我) | 23 December 1994 | Fancy Pie Records | Mandarin | 1. I'm Still Your Lover (Unplugged) (我依然是你的情人); 2. Sincerely (真心真意); 3. Promise Me (答應我); 4. Love Will Never Return (愛,再也不回來); 5. Don't Let Me Fall for You (別讓我真愛上你); 6. Let Me Love (讓我愛吧); 7. Cease to Be Faithful (變心); 8. Love Come So Easy; 9. Fly (飛); 10. You're Not My Only One (你不是我的唯一); 11. Make the World More Beautiful (Merry Christmas) (讓世界更美麗) |
| Brave Enough to Love (勇敢去愛) | 12 June 1995 | Fancy Pie Records | English | 1. I've Never Been to Me (Charlene cover); 2. Break Out (Swing Out Sister cover); 3. Words Get in the Way (Miami Sound Machine cover); 4. Smoke Gets in Your Eyes (Tamara Drasin cover); 5. Love Me Tender (Elvis Presley cover); 6. Stand by Me (Ben E. King cover); 7. Hero (Mariah Carey cover); 8. The Sign (Ace of Base cover); 9. I Will Always Love You (Whitney Houston cover); 10. Come Back to Me (Janet Jackson cover) |
| Woman in Love (被愛的女人) | 3 September 1995 | Fancy Pie Records | Mandarin | 1. You're the One I Love (我愛的是你); 2. Woman in Love (Orchestral Version) (被愛的女人); 3. You're in My Heart (你在我心上); 4. Never Weary (不朽); 5. Can't Learn to Love You More (學不會更愛你); 6. Forget It (忘了吧); 7. Unbiased (視若無睹); 8. Woman in Love (被愛的女人); 9. The Apple of Your Eyes (掌上明珠); 10. Thanks (感謝) |
| CoCo Lee (CoCo 李玟同名專輯) | 14 June 1996 | Sony Music Taiwan | Mandarin | 1. Love Me a Little Longer (愛我久一點); 2. Yesterday's Passion (往日情); 3. She Cries Before She Sleeps (feat. Mindy Ke/Quah柯以敏) (她在睡前哭泣); 4. The Wonderful Thing About Love (愛情的好處); 5. Asking My Heart (心裡問); 6. Hiding from the Rain (無處躲雨); 7. Trust (依賴); 8. Need Some Lovin' Tonite; 9. Love You Forever (愛到底); 10. The Last Chapter of the Fairy Tale (童話最後一章) |
| CoCo's Party | 25 November 1996 | Sony Music Taiwan | English | 1. It's a Party; 2. Safe in the Arms of Love; 3. To Love You More (Celine Dion cover); 4. This Masquerade (Leon Russell cover); 5. There'll Be Sad Songs (Billy Ocean cover); 6. Colors of the Wind (Judy Kuhn cover); 7. I Love Your Smile (Shanice cover); 8. Another Sad Love Song (Ballad Version) (Toni Braxton cover); 9. Dancing Queen (ABBA cover); 10. Shadow Dancing (Andy Gibb cover); 11. Another Sad Love Song (Dance Version) (Toni Braxton cover) |
| Each Time I Think of You (每一次想你) | 14 May 1997 | Sony Music Taiwan | Mandarin/Cantonese | 1. Love You Is My Freedom (愛你是我的自由); 2. Each Time I Think of You (每一次想你); 3. Garden of Eden (伊甸園); 4. Cat (貓); 5. On the Road (路上); 6. Waiting for Love (等愛降落); 7. In the Morning (明天一早的決定); 8. My Wings (with sisters Carol & Nancy) (我的翅膀); 9. Still in Love with You; 10. Love You Is Hard (愛你是大麻煩); Special Edition: 11. Waiting for Love (in Cantonese) (虚線) |
| Be Careful Next Time (CoCo 首張廣東專輯) | 10 November 1997 | Sony Music Taiwan | Cantonese | 1. Longing to See You (真的想見你); 2. Love You Again in 2090 (2090年再爱你); 3. Be Careful Next Time (下次小心); 4. Remain of Your Warmth (餘溫); 5. Tight Between Men & Women (男女之爭); 6. Never Forget (念念不忘); 7. Mr. Almost-Right (差不多先生); 8. Ask Yourself (问自己); 9. Sad Angel (憂傷天使); 10. If You Decided Not to Love Me (如果你決定不愛我) |
| Di Da Di Hints (Di Da Di 暗示) | 13 January 1998 | Sony Music Taiwan | Mandarin | 1. After Winter's Gone (過完冬季); 2. Di Da Di; 3. All I Want to Say (暗示); 4. Beautiful Bimbo Girl (美麗笨女人); 5. Female Heart (女人心); 6. Longing to See You (真想見到你); 7. Perfect in Every Way; 8. Blame It on Pop Music (都是流行歌曲的錯); 9. Message (訊息); 10. Hint After Hint (再暗示); 11. Someone Will Love Me (不怕沒人來愛我); 12. Pet (寵物) |
| Sunny Day Feelin' Good (Sunny Day 好心情) | 30 June 1998 | Sony Music Taiwan | Mandarin | 1. You Are My Superman (你是我的Superman); 2. Secretly Love You (默默愛你); 3. Feelin' Good (好心情); 4. Diamond (亮亮的承諾); 5. Sunny Day; 6. Reflection (自已); 7. Don't Wanna Play (不玩這種); 8. The Answer (答案); 9. Don't Love You Anymore (不愛你了); 10. Colors of the World (顏色); 11. Hallucination (錯覺); 12. Wu Wu La La La |
| From Today Till Forever (今天到永遠) | 27 May 1999 | Sony Music Taiwan | Mandarin | 1. See You Again (再見一面); 2. Stay with Me; 3. From Today Until Forever (今天到永遠); 4. Mirror (魔鏡); 5. Handsome Man (美男子); 6. Best Love (最好的愛); 7. We Can Dance (我們可以跳舞); 8. You Let Me Feeling (你讓我有感覺); 9. You Do Love Me (你是愛我的); 10. We Agreed (我們說好); 11. Honesty Danger (真心話大冒險); 12. Touch (觸摸); 13. Complete (完整) |
| Just No Other Way | 2 November 1999 | 550 Music/Epic Records | English | 1. Do You Want My Love (feat. A-Butter); 2. Just No Other Way (To Love Me); 3. Can't Get Over (feat. Kelly Price); 4. Did You Really Love Me; 5. Before I Fall in Love; 6. Wherever You Go; 7. I Will Be Your Friend; 8. All Tied Up in You; 9. Don't You Want My Love; 10. Crazy Ridiculous; 11. Can We Talk About It |
| True Lover You & Me (真情人 You & Me) | 24 August 2000 | Sony Music Taiwan | Mandarin | 1. True Lover (真情人); 2. Love You Until... (愛你愛到); 3. Another Woman's Perfume (誰的香水味) (feat. Silky Fine); 4. Watch Out for Men (小心男人); 5. Sweet Baby (撒野); 6. You & Me; 7. My Happy Cannot Who (我的快樂不為誰); 8. Natural Reaction (自然反應); 9. When Love's in Pieces (當愛成碎片); 10. You Asked... (你問) |
| Promise | 12 October 2001 | Sony Music Taiwan | Mandarin/Cantonese | 1. So Crazy; 2. Female Warrior (actress versed in swordplay) (刀馬旦) (feat. Jay Chou); 3. Baby, I'm Sorry (Baby 對不起); 4. Blue Sky (藍天); 5. Love Too Much (愛太多); 6. Let Go (逃脫); 7. I'm Still in Love; 8. Eternal Promise (不變的諾言); 9. Love So Real (愛是那麼真); 10. Start the Countdown (倒數開始); 11. Easy Come Easy Go (好來好往); 12. Selfish Love (愛你才在意); 13. A Love Before Time (月光愛人) |
| Exposed | 25 March 2005 | Sony BMG | English | 1. Step In; 2. No Doubt (feat. Blaaze); 3. Gotta Clue (feat. Joon Park of g.o.d); 4. Hush; 5. So Good; 6. Touch; 7. Rock It; 8. All Around the World; 9. Belly Dance; 10. Cool (feat. Joon Park); 11. Music We Make; 12. No Doubt (feat. Joon Park); 13. Magic Words |
| Just Want You (要定你) | 22 September 2006 | Sony Music Taiwan | Mandarin | 1. Hip-Hop Tonight (feat. Vanness Wu); 2. Just Want You (要定你); 3. Love at 85 °C (愛在85 °C); 4. The Ninth Night (第九夜); 5. Dangerous Lover (危險情人); 6. Spy (諜對諜); 7. Waiting for Me (等待為我); 8. Deserted Island (無人島); 9. Farvorly Loving Me (寵愛我); 10. Never Ending Love (愛不停) |
| East to West (CoCo 的東西) | 14 August 2009 | Warner Music Taiwan/Music Nation Ursa Major Limited | Mandarin | 1. I Have a Dream; 2. I Love Movies (我愛看電影); 3. BYOB (Bring Your Own Bag); 4. Party Time; 5. Love Now (愛要現在); 6. Beautiful Theme Song (美麗的主題曲); 7. Turn (流轉); 8. Ready or Not; 9. Shadow (影子); 10. Triangle Heart (三角心); 11. Already Loved (既然愛了); 12. East to West (東西); 2010 Limited edition (2010 美夢限定版) : 13. Sweet Dream (美夢); 14. Hello-C; 15. Turn (Remix) |
| Illuminate (盛開) | 31 May 2013 | Universal Music Taiwan/CL Production | Mandarin/English | 1. Knock Knock (叩叩); 2. Stuck on U (偷心賊); 3. Can't It Be (能不能); 4. Side Effects of Love (愛的副作用); 5. Party Queen; 6. Night Without You (想念你的夜); 7. Illuminate (盛開); 8. 1 + 1 (一加一); 9. Couples Dance (雙人舞); 10. Match Made in Heaven; 11. I Just Wanna Marry You; 2013 Limited edition (2013 閃亮限定版) : 12. Knock Knock (Remix); 13. I Just Wanna Marry You (Remix) |
| Always on My Mind | 23 August 2024 | Universal Music Taiwan/CL Production | Mandarin/English | 1. Always on My Mind; 2. How Could You Let Me Be Sad; 3. I Am Truly Hurt; 4. Every Night; 5. When Will I See You Again; 6. Blast; 7. Crossing Path; 8. If |

=== Live albums ===
| title | Release date | Label | language | Track listing |
|---|---|---|---|---|
| You Are in My Heart Concert (你在我心上演唱会全纪录) | December 1995 | Fancy Pie Records | Mandarin/English/French/Spanish | 1. Meant to Be (前世今生); 2. You're in My Heart (你在我心上); 3. What's Up? (4 Non Blondes cover); 4. Stand by Me (Ben E. King cover); 5. Break Out (Swing Out Sister cover); 6. Rose Garden (玫瑰園); 7. Don't Let Me Fall for You (別讓我真愛上你); 8. Love Me Tender (Elvis Presley cover); 9. Tonight (今晚); 10. Love Come So Easy; 11. Promise Me (答應我); 12. Sincerely (真心真意); 13. Petit Bateau; 14. Mi Tierra (Gloria Estefan cover); 15. Fly (飛) |
| Million Fans Concert (萬人迷演唱会精彩实录) | 17 December 1998 | Sony Music Taiwan | Mandarin/English/French/Spanish | CD 1: 1. It's a Party + Love You If I Want (愛你是我的自由) + La Bamba + It's a Party; 2. Longing to See You (真的想見你); 3. After Winter's Gone (過完冬季); 4. Feelin' Good (好心情) + Material Girl (Madonna cover); 5. Diamond (亮亮的承諾); 6. You're My Superman (你是我的Superman) + Mr. Almost-Right (差不多先生); 7. Each Time I Think of You (每一次想你); 8. I'm Still Your Lover (我依然是你的情人); 9. Secretly Love You (默默愛你)(with Human Nature); CD 2: 1. Di Da Di + Sha La La (Manfred Mann cover); 2. Killing Me Softly (Roberta Flack cover); 3. Waiting for Love (等愛降落); 4. Careless Whisper (George Michael cover); 5. Colors of the World (顏色); 6. All I Want to Say (暗示); 7. Reflection (自已); 8. Sunny Day; 9. Yesterday's Passion (往日情); 10. River Deep Mountain High (Tina Turner cover); 11. Love Me a Little Longer (愛我久一點) |

=== Compilations ===
| title | Release date | Label | language | Track listing |
|---|---|---|---|---|
| Beloved Collection (情人被愛精选集) | 2 August 1996 | Fancy Pie Records | Mandarin | CD 1: 1. I'm Still Your Lover (我依然是你的情人); 2. Can't Give You Tenderness (不能給你溫柔); 3. Hard to Leave (難分難離); 4. Rose Garden (玫瑰園); 5. Sincerely (真心真意); 6. Promise Me (答應我); 7. Don't Let Me Fall for You (別讓我真愛上你); 8. Cease to Be Faithful (變心); 9. You're the One I Love (我愛的是你); 10. Woman in Love (被愛的女人); 11. Unbiased (視若無睹); 12. Loved Deeply (深深爱過) (feat. Allen Ting) (previously unreleased); CD 2: 1. I'm Still Your Lover (我依然是你的情人) (Karaoke Version); 2. Sincerely (真心真意) (Karaoke Version); 3. Woman in Love (被愛的女人) (Karaoke Version); 4. You Made Me Drunk (live) (你把我灌醉) |
| The Best of My Love | 28 January 2000 | Sony Music Taiwan | Mandarin/Cantonese | CD 1: 1. Listen One More Time(NEW) (再聽一次); 2. Everyday Moment of Love(NEW) (愛你在每一天); 3. Yesterday's Passion (往日情); 4. My Wings (with Sisters Carol & Nancy) (我的翅膀); 5. After Winter's Gone (過完冬季); 6. See You Again (再見一面); 7. Waiting for Love (等愛降落); 8. All I Want to Say (暗示); 9. Secretly Love You (默默愛你); 10. Reflection (自己); 11. Complete (完整); CD 2: 1. I'm Still Your Lover (我依然是你的情人); 2. Love Me a Little Longer (愛我久一點); 3. Love You Is My Freedom (愛你是我的自由); 4. Di Da Di; 5. Longing to See You (真的想見你); 6. You're My Superman (你是我的Superman); 7. Sunny Day; 8. Feelin' Good (好心情); 9. Stay with Me; 10. Love You in 2090 (2090年再爱你); 11. Sad Angel (憂傷天使) |
| 1994–2008 Best Collection | 16 May 2008 | Sony Music Taiwan | Mandarin/English | CD 1: 1. Sahara Igloo (previously unreleased) (撒哈拉冰室); 2. It's Really Love You (previously unreleased) (是真的愛你); 3. Hip-Hop Tonight (feat.Vanness Wu); 4. So Crazy; 5. True Lover (真情人); 6. Feelin' Good (好心情); 7. After Winter's Gone (過完冬季); 8. Yesterday's Passion (往日情); 9. Di Da Di; 10. You Do Love Me (你是愛我的); 11. Mirror (魔鏡); 12. The Ninth Night (第九夜); 13. Moonlight Lover (月光愛人); 14. Before I Fall in Love; 15. I'm Still Your Lover (我依然是你的情人); CD 2: 1. Me, My Lover and I (previously unreleased)(我和愛人和我); 2. Pondering About Love (previously unreleased)(冥想愛); 3. Female Warrior (刀馬旦) (feat.Jay Chou); 4. Love at 85 °C (愛在85 °C); 5. The Answer (答案); 6. Just Want You (要定你); 7. No Doubt (feat.Blaaze); 8. Complete (完整); 9. All I Want to Say (暗示); 10. When Love's in Pieces (當愛成碎片); 11. Do You Want My Love; 12. Love You Until... (愛你愛到); 13. Woman in Love (被愛的女人); 14. Each Time I Think of You (每一次想你); 15. Love Me a Little Longer (愛我久一點) |
| Ultimate Coco (最完美影音典藏精选) | 2 March 2012 | Sony Music Taiwan | Mandarin | CD 1: 1. Feelin' Good (好心情); 2. Di Da Di; 3. So Crazy; 4. Hip-Hop Tonight (feat.Vanness Wu); 5. Love You Is My Freedom (愛你是我的自由); 6. True Lover (真情人); 7. Aegean Sea (愛琴海); 8. Just Want You (要定你); 9. Sunny Day (艷陽天); 10. Take a Chance on Love (碰碰看愛情); 11. Female Warrior (刀馬旦) (feat.Jay Chou); 12. Love Me a Little Longer (愛我久一點); 13. After Winter's Gone (過完冬季); 14. Waiting for Love (等愛降落); 15. Love at 85 °C (愛在85 °C); 16. Baby I'm Sorry (Baby 對不起); CD 2: 1. Yesterday's Passion (往日情); 2. See You Again (再見一面); 3. All I Want to Say (暗示); 4. Love You Until... (愛你愛到); 5. Complete (完整); 6. The Ninth Night (第九夜); 7. I'm Still in Love; 8. Really Love You (是真的愛你); 9. Everyday Moments of Love (愛你在每一天); 10. Dangerous Lover (危險情人); 11. With You I'm Contented (有你就夠了); 12. Missing You in 365 Days (想你的365天); 13. Best Love (最好的愛); 14. She Cries Before She Sleeps (feat. Mindy Ke/Quah柯以敏) (她在睡前哭泣); 15. Woman in Love (被愛的女人); 16. I'm Still Your Lover (我依然是你的情人); DVD: 1. Di Da Di (MV); 2. After Winter's Gone (過完冬季) (MV); 3. Feelin' Good (好心情) (MV); 4. Female Warrior (刀馬旦) (feat.Jay Chou) (MV); 5. Aegean Sea (愛琴海) (MV); 6. Hip-Hop Tonight (feat.Vanness Wu) (MV); 7. The Ninth Night (第九夜) (MV); 8. Stay with Me (MV); 9. Another Woman's Perfume (誰的香水味) (MV); 10. She Cries Before She Sleeps (feat. Mindy Ke/Quah柯以敏) (她在睡前哭泣) (MV); Bonus : 1. Reflection (自已) + After Winter's Gone (過完冬季) + A Love Before Time (月光愛人) (live) |
| 「You & I」25th Anniversary Collection (You & I 经典全纪录) | 21 June 2019 | CL Production/Sony Music Taiwan/Universal Music Taiwan | Mandarin | CD 1: 1. You & I (你和我) (NEW); 2. Broken (previously unreleased) (斷了); 3. I Don't Care (previously unreleased) (feat. Vava); 4. Fancy (迷人) (previously unreleased); 5. 18; 6. Can't It Be (能不能); 7. The Ninth Night (第九夜); 8. Baby I'm Sorry (Baby 對不起); 9. So Crazy (如此瘋狂); 10. Female Warrior (刀馬旦) (feat.Jay Chou); 11. Moonlight Lover (月光愛人); 12. Everyday Moments of Love (愛你在每一天); CD 2: 1. True Lover (真情人); 2. You Do Love Me (你是愛我的); 3. Sunny Day (艷陽天); 4. The Answer (答案); 5. Feelin' Good (好心情); 6. All I Want to Say (暗示); 7. After Winter's Gone (過完冬季); 8. Di Da Di (滴答滴); 9. Longing to See You (真想見到你); 10. Love You Is My Freedom (愛你是我的自由); 11. Love Me a Little Longer (愛我久一點); 12. Yesterday's Passion (往日情); 13. I'm Still Your Lover (You & I Tour Version) (我依然是你的情人) |
| Battle Song CoCo Collection (戰歌李玟精選) | 6 July 2023 | Warner Music Group | Mandarin | CD 1: 1. Battle Song (previously unreleased); 2. Tragic (previously unreleased); 3. Candy (previously unreleased); 4. Playboy (previously unreleased); 5. Miss Dizzy; 6. Reflection (2020); 7. Paradise Wonder; 8. The Love You Left Behind; 9. Knock Knock; 10. Stuck on You; 11. I Just Wanna Marry You; 12. Missing You Night; 13. Illuminated; 14. Sweet Dream; 15. BYOB; CD 2: 1. I Love Watch Movies; 2. I Have a Dream; 3. Ready or Not; 4. Party Time; 5. Beautiful Theme Song; 6. Turn; 7. Pet Boy; 8. Today Until Forever; 9. Beautiful Bimbo Girl; 10. Perfect in Everyway; 11. Garden of Eden; 12. Love You Is Hard; 13. Hiding from Rain; 14. Promise Me; 15. I Want Your Love (feat. Bibi Zhou & Sally Yeh) |

=== Remix albums ===
| title | Release date | Label | language | Track listing |
|---|---|---|---|---|
| Dance with the Wind (玟風起舞) | May 1997 | Fancy Pie Records | Mandarin/English | 1. Woman in Love (Remix) (被愛的女人); 2. Let Me Love (Remix) (讓我愛吧); 3. This Is It (Remix) (就到這裡); 4. Forget It (Remix) (忘了吧); 5. Rhythm Is Gonna Get You (Remix); 6. Can't Learn to Love You More (Remix) (學不會更愛你); 7. Weekend in Taipei (Remix)(週末的台北); 8. Break Out (Remix); 9. The Sign (Remix); 10. What's Up? (Remix) |
| D.IS. CoCo (愛琴海新歌 + 電音精選) | 18 June 2002 | Sony Music Taiwan | Mandarin/Cantonese | CD 1: 1. Pet Boy (previously unreleased) (寵物男孩); 2. Aegean Sea (previously unreleased) (愛琴海); 3. Dao Ma Dan (Remix) (刀馬旦) (feat. Jay Chou); 4. Baby I'm Sorry (Remix) (Baby對不起); 5. Love You If I Want (Remix) (愛你是我的自由); 6. Mirror (Remix) (魔鏡); 7. Let Go (Remix) (逃脫); 8. True Lover (Remix) (真情人); 9. From Today Until Forever (Remix) (今天到永遠); 10. With You I'm Contented (Remix) (有你就夠了); CD 2: 1. So Crazy (Remix); 2. Colors of the World (Remix) (顏色); 3. You & Me (Remix); 4. Di Da Di (Remix); 5. We Can Dance (Remix); 6. You're My Superman (Remix) (你是我的Superman); 7. Sunny Day (Remix); 8. Love Me a Little Longer (Remix) (愛我久一點); 9. Best Love (Remix) (最好的愛) + Secretly Love You (Remix) (默默愛你); BONUS: 1. D.Is.CoCo Non Stop Remix; 2. From the Beginning Til' the End (previously unreleased) (煙絲萬縷) (feat. Jacky Cheung) |

=== EPs ===
| title | Release date | Label | language | Track listing |
|---|---|---|---|---|
| Take a Chance on Love (碰碰看愛情) | 14 August 1998 | Sony Music Taiwan | Mandarin/English | 1. Take a Chance on Love (碰碰看愛情); 2. Reflection (English Version); 3. Missing You in 365 Days (想你的365天); 4. Take a Chance on Love (Karaoke Version); 5. Feelin' Good (Karaoke Version) |

=== Maxi-singles ===
| title | Release date | Label | language | Track listing |
|---|---|---|---|---|
| "Di Da Di Color Remix" (5顔6色 Di Da Di) | 2 April 1998 | Sony Music Taiwan | Mandarin | 1. Colors of the World (颜色); 2. Di Da Di (Red Fire Remix) (紅色火熱勁爆Remix); 3. Di Da Di (Crystal Blue Remix) (藍色晶螢剔透Remix); 4. Di Da Di (Acidulous Orange Remix) (橙色微酸香甜Remix) |
| "Do You Want My Love" | 7 February 2000 | 550 Music/Epic Records | English | 1. Do You Want My Love (W/O Rap); 2. Do You Want My Love; 3. Do You Want My Love (Kenny Diaz Radio Edit); 4. Do You Want My Love (Hex Hector Mix); 5. Do You Want My Love (Alternate Lyric w/o Rap); 6. Do You Want My Love (Multimedia) |
| "Wherever You Go" | 21 September 2000 | 550 Music/Epic Records | English | 1. Wherever You Go (Radio Edit); 2. Wherever You Go (Soda Club Mix); 3. Wherever You Go (Soda Club Master Mix); 4. Wherever You Go (Jonathan Peters Radio Mix); 5. Wherever You Go (Jonathan Peters Extended Radio Mix); 6. Do You Want My Love (Soda Club Master Mix) |

=== Digital singles ===
| title | Release date | Label | language | Track listing |
|---|---|---|---|---|
| "I Have a Dream" | 1 May 2008 | Music Nation Ursa Major Ltd. | Mandarin | 1. I Have a Dream |
| "I Love Watching Movies" (我愛看電影) | 18 September 2008 | Music Nation Ursa Major Ltd. | Mandarin | 1. I Love Watching Movies (我愛看電影) |
| "BYOB" (Bring Your Own Bag) | 17 April 2009 | Music Nation Ursa Major Ltd. | Mandarin | 1. BYOB (Bring Your Own Bag) |
| "Four Seas" (四海) | 27 December 2010 | Universal Music Taiwan/CL Production | Mandarin | 1. Four Seas (四海) |
| "I Just Wanna Marry U" | 24 October 2011 | Universal Music Taiwan/CL Production | Mandarin/English | 1. I Just Wanna Marry U (English Version); 2. I Just Wanna Marry U (Mandarin Version) |
| "18" | 17 January 2017 | Universal Music Taiwan/CL Production | Mandarin | 1. 18 |
| "Reflection/ Myself 自已 (2020)" | 29 August 2020 | Walt Disney Pictures | Mandarin | 1. Reflection/ Myself 自已 (2020) |
| "Paradise Wonder" | 17 June 2022 | Warner Music Group | Mandarin | 1. Paradise Wonder |
| "The Love You Left Behind" | 24 July 2022 | Warner Music Group | Mandarin | 1. The Love You Left Behind |
| "Miss Dizzy" | 16 August 2022 | Warner Music Group | Mandarin | 1. Miss Dizzy |
| "Legend of the East" | 9 September 2022 | Warner Music Group | Mandarin | 1. Legend of the East |
| "Playboy" | 25 November 2022 | Warner Music Group | Mandarin | 1. Playboy |
| "Candy (feat. MaSiWei)" | 5 January 2023 | Warner Music Group | Mandarin | 1. Candy (feat. MaSiWei) |
| "Tragic" | 14 February 2023 | Warner Music Group | Mandarin | 1. Tragic |
| "Battle Song" | 28 May 2023 | Warner Music Group | Mandarin | 1. Battle Song |

=== Compilation appearances ===
| title | Release date | Label | language | Track listing |
|---|---|---|---|---|
| Red Hot Hits 93' Autumn Edition (火熱動感93'勁秋版) | October 1993 | Capital Artists/Fancy Pie Records | Cantonese | |
| Red Hot Hits 94' Love Party (火熱動感94'戀愛Party) | September 1994 | Capital Artists/Fancy Pie Records | Cantonese | |
| Statement of Love, Duet Songs (愛情宣言, 情歌對唱) | November 1994 | Capital Artists/Fancy Pie Records | Cantonese | |
| Merry Christmas (聖誕禮讚) | December 1994 | Capital Artists/Fancy Pie Records | Cantonese | |

== Videography ==
| title | Release date | Label | language | Track listing |
|---|---|---|---|---|
| Foot print (足跡) | 1995 | Fancy Pie Records | Mandarin/English | |
| You're in My Heart Concert | 1995 | Fancy Pie Records | Mandarin/English/French/Spanish | |
| Coco's Workout Camp | 1996 | Sony Music Taiwan | Mandarin/English | |
| CoCo in Italy | 1998 | Sony Music Taiwan | Mandarin/English | |
| Di Da Di | 1998 | Sony Music Taiwan | Mandarin | |
| Sunny Day | 1998 | Sony Music Taiwan | Mandarin | |
| Million Fans Concert | 1999 | Sony Music Taiwan | Mandarin/English/Cantonese/Spanish | |
| The Video Collection | 2000 | Sony Music Taiwan | Mandarin/English/Cantonese | |
| CoCo So Crazy | 2002 | Sony Music Taiwan | Mandarin/Cantonese | |
| All my Coco | 2002 | Sony Music Taiwan | Mandarin/Cantonese/English | |

== Filmography ==
=== Film ===
| title | year | Director | Role | Notes | Ref. |
|---|---|---|---|---|---|
| Mulan | 1998 | Barry Cook and Tony Bancroft | Fa Mulan | Voice in the Mandarin version | |
| No Tobacco (无烟草) | 2002 | Stanley Kwan | | | |
| Master of Everything (自娱自乐) | 2004 | Lee Xin | Lu Hua | | |
| Forever Young (栀子花开) | 2015 | He Jiong | Teacher Han | Cameo | |

=== Television ===
| title | year | Original network | Role | Notes | Ref. |
|---|---|---|---|---|---|
| Kangsi Coming (康熙來了) | 2005, 2006, 2009, 2010, 2013 | CTi Variety | Guest | 5 episodes | |
| Chinese Idol (season 1) (中国梦之声第一季) | 19 May – 25 August 2013 | DragonTV | Judge | 16 episodes | |
| Hi 2014 (嗨!2014) | 9 May 2014 | CCTV 1 | Guest | Episode 5 | |
| Dancing with the Stars China (与星共舞) | 1 February 2015 | DragonTV | Judge | Episode 7 | |
| Super Idol (season 1) (星动亚洲第一季) | 17 July 2015 | Anhui TV/MBC TV | Judge/coach | Episodes 2, 5, 9 | |
| Super Idol (season 1) (星动亚洲第一季) | 7 August 2015 | Anhui TV/MBC TV | Judge/coach | Episodes 2, 5, 9 | |
| Super Idol (season 1) (星动亚洲第一季) | 11 September 2015 | Anhui TV/MBC TV | Judge/coach | Episodes 2, 5, 9 | |
| Talented Singer (season 1) (隐藏的歌手第一季) | 25 October 2015 | City TV/BTV/iQIYI | Guest performer | Episode 2 | |
| I Am a Singer (Chinese season 4) (我是歌手第四季) | 15 January – 15 April 2016 | Hunan TV | Contestant/winner | 13 episodes | |
| Come Sing with Me (season 1) (我想和你唱第一季) | 7 May 2016 | Hunan TV | Guest performer | Episode 1 | |
| The Jin Xing Show (金星秀) | 26 April 2017 | DragonTV | Guest | Episode 114 | |
| Come Sing with Me (season 2) (我想和你唱第二季) | 8 June 2017 | Hunan TV | Guest performer | Episode 8 | |
| Sing Out! (这!就是歌唱 对唱季) | 21 September 2018 | Youku | Advisor | Episode 9 | |
| World's Got Talent (巅峰之夜) | 19 April – 12 July 2019 | Hunan TV | Judge | 13 episodes | |
| Jungle Voice (season 2) (声林之王第二季) | 27 September 2019 | ETtoday | Advisor | Episodes 6, 7 | |
| Jungle Voice (season 2) (声林之王第二季) | 4 October 2019 | ETtoday | Advisor | Episodes 6, 7 | |
| Infinity and Beyond (season 1) (聲生不息) | 2022 | Mango TV/TVB | Performer | 12 episodes | |
| Sing! China (season 7) (中國好聲音) | 2022 | Zhejiang TV | Mentor | Episodes 9–13 | |

== Tours ==
| date | Country/territory | City | Venue | Guest | Setlist |
Million Fans Tour
| 2 August 1998 | Taiwan | Taipei | Municipal Stadium | Human Nature | 1. It's a Party + Love You If I Want (愛你是我的自由) + La Bamba + It's a Party; 2. Longing to See You (真的想見你); 3. After Winter's Gone (過完冬季); 4. Feelin' Good (好心情) + Material Girl (Madonna cover); 5. Diamond (亮亮的承諾); 6. You're My Superman (你是我的Superman) + Mr. Almost-Right (差不多先生); 7. Everytime I Think of You (每一次想你); 8. I'm Still Your Lover (我依然是你的情人); 9. Secretly Love You (默默愛你)(with Human Nature); 10. Di Da Di + Sha La La (Manfred Mann cover); 11. Killing Me Softly (Roberta Flack cover); 12. Waiting for Love (等愛降落); 13. Careless Whisper (Wham! cover); 14. Colors of the World (顏色); 15. All I Want to Say (暗示); 16. Reflection (自已); 17. Sunny Day; 18. Yesterday's Passion (往日情); 19. River Deep Mountain High (Tina Turner cover); 20. Love Me a Little Longer (愛我久一點) |
| 15 August 1998 | Taiwan | Kaohsiung City | Chung Shan Stadium | None | |
True Lover You & Me Asia Tour
| 17 September 2000 | Mainland China | Shenzhen | Shenzhen Gymnasium | None | |
| 25 September 2000 | Mainland China | Wuhan | Xinhualu Stadium | None | |
| 29 September 2000 | Mainland China | Shanghai | Shanghai Stadium | None | |
| 15 December 2000 | Singapore | | Suntec City Concert Hall | None | |
| 19 September 2001 | Mainland China | Chengdu | Chengdu Sports Center | None | |
| 23 September 2001 | Mainland China | Jinan | Shandong Provincial Sports Centre Stadium | None | |
| 27 September 2001 | Mainland China | Hangzhou | Yellow Dragon Sports Center | None | |
| 29 September 2001 | Mainland China | Nanjing | Nanjing Wutaishan Jinbang Gymnasium | None | |
So Crazy China Tour
| 6 October 2003 | Mainland China | Beijing | Workers' Stadium | None | |
| 31 October 2003 | Mainland China | Chongqing | Banan Stadium | None | |
East to West World Tour
| 27 March 2010 | Taiwan | Taipei | Taipei Arena | None | |
| 3 July 2010 | United States | Las Vegas | Encore Las Vegas | None | |
| 4 July 2010 | United States | Las Vegas | Encore Las Vegas | None | |
| 2 October 2010 | Singapore | | Singapore Indoor Stadium | None | |
| 16 December 2010 | Mainland China | Nanning | Guangxi Stadium | None | |
CoCo Lee 18 World Tour
| 6 May 2017 | Mainland China | Shenzhen | Shenzhen Bay Sports Center | Jam Hsiao | 1. Di Da Di + Knock Knock (叩叩)+ Bad Romance (Lady Gaga cover) + Step In; 2. I'm Still Your Lover (我依然是你的情人); 3. Yesterday's Passion (往日情); 4. Can't It Be (能不能); 5. Nobody (Wonder Girls cover); 6. True Lover (真情人); 7. Summer Love (with Jam Hsiao) (爱之初体验); 8. You (with Jam Hsiao); 9. What's Up? (4 Non Blondes cover); 10. High Fashion (JJ Lin cover); 11. A Love Before Time (月光爱人); 12. Reflection (自己); 13. Before I Fall in Love; 14. The Answer (答案); 15. 18; 16. Every Moment of Love (爱你在每一天); 17. Where Did Time Go (时间都去哪了); 18. So Crazy; 19. You Are My Superman (你是我的Superman); 20. Beautiful Bimbo (美丽笨女人); 21. Do You Want My Love; 22. Dao Ma Dan (刀马旦); Encore: 1. Missing You in 365 Days (想你的365天); 2. Feelin' Good (好心情) |
| 24 June 2017 | Mainland China | Shanghai | Mercedes-Benz Arena | G.E.M. | 1. Di Da Di + Knock Knock (叩叩)+ Bad Romance (Lady Gaga cover) + Step In; 2. I'm Still Your Lover (我依然是你的情人); 3. Yesterday's Passion (往日情); 4. After Winter's Gone (过完冬季); 5. Nobody (Wonder Girls cover); 6. True Lover (真情人); 7. Summer Love (爱之初体验) (with G.E.M.); 8. You Made Me Drunk (with G.E.M); 9. What's Up? (4 Non Blondes cover); 10. High Fashion (JJ Lin cover); 11. All I Want to Say (暗示); 12. Reflection (自己); 13. Before I Fall in Love; 14. The Answer (答案); 15. A Love Before Time (月光爱人); 16. 18; 17. Every Moment of Love (爱你在每一天); 18. So Crazy; 19. You Are My Superman (你是我的Superman); 20. Beautiful Bimbo (美丽笨女人); 21. Do You Want My Love; 22. Dao Ma Dan (刀马旦); Encore: 1. Missing You in 365 Days (想你的365天); 2. Feelin' Good (好心情) |
| 8 July 2017 | Mainland China | Beijing | LeSports Center | JJ Lin | 1. Di Da Di + Knock Knock (叩叩)+ Bad Romance (Lady Gaga cover) + Step In; 2. I'm Still Your Lover (我依然是你的情人); 3. Yesterday's Passion (往日情); 4. After Winter's Gone (过完冬季); 5. Nobody (Wonder Girls cover); 6. True Lover (真情人); 7. Summer Love (爱之初体验); 8. What's Up? (4 Non Blondes cover); 9. A Love Before Time (with JJ Lin) (月光爱人); 10. High Fashion (JJ Lin cover) (with JJ Lin); 11. All I Want to Say (暗示); 12. Reflection (自己); 13. Before I Fall in Love; 14. The Answer (答案); 15. 18; 16. Every Moment of Love (爱你在每一天); 17. So Crazy; 18. You Are My Superman (你是我的Superman); 19. Beautiful Bimbo (美丽笨女人); 20. Do You Want My Love; 21. Dao Ma Dan (刀马旦); Encore: 1. Missing You in 365 Days(想你的365天); 2. Feelin' Good (好心情) |
| 22 July 2017 | Mainland China | Guangzhou | Guangzhou Gymnasium | None | |
| 12 August 2017 | Mainland China | Xi'an | QuJiang International Conference Exhibition Center | Jason Zhang | |
| 9 September 2017 | Mainland China | Wuhan | Wuhan Sports Centre Stadium | Stefanie Sun | |
| 23 September 2017 | Mainland China | Hangzhou | Yellow Dragon Sports Center | Dimash Kudaibergen | |
| 18 November 2017 | Mainland China | Nanjing | Wutaishan Sports Center | Yoga Lin | |
| 9 December 2017 | Mainland China | Changsha | Hunan International Convention & Exhibition Center | MC Jin | |
| 24 March 2018 | Mainland China | Chongqing | Chongqing International Expo Center Multi-Purpose Hall | None | |
"You & I" 25 Anniversary World Tour
| 21 June 2019 | Taiwan | Taipei | Taipei Arena | Jolin Tsai | 1. Ready or Not + Knock Knock(叩叩) + Aegean Sea (爱琴海); 2. Love Me a Little Longer (爱我久一点); 3. The Ninth Night (第九夜); 4. After Winter's Gone (过完冬季); 5. Stock on You (偷心贼) + Pet boy (宠物男孩) + So Good + Feelin' Good (好心情); 6. Beautiful Bimbo (美丽笨女人); 7. Before I Fall in Love; 8. Bohemian Rhapsody (Queen band cover); 9. Just Be Happy (欢喜就好); 10. The Best Love (最好的爱) + Mirror (魔镜) + From Today Until Forever (今天到永远) + Woman in Love (被爱的女人) + Pet (宠物); 11. Baby, I'm Sorry (Baby 对不起); 12. Dao Ma Dan (刀马旦); 13. You Are My Superman (你是我的Superman); 14. So Crazy + Ugly Beauty + Feelin' Good (Bossa Nova Version) (with Jolin Tsai); 15. Longing to See You (真想见到你); 16. You Do Love Me (你是爱我的); 17. Do You Want My Love; 18. True Lover (真情人); 19. Each Time I Think of You (intro) (每一次想你) + Yesterday's Passion (往日情) + Can't It Be (能不能) + All I Want to Say (暗示) + The Answer (答案) + A Love Before Time (月光爱人); 20. You & I; Encore: 1. Sunny Day (intro) + Love You If I Want (爱你是我的自由) + Sunny Day + Stay with Me + DiDaDi; 2. I'm Still Your Lover (我依然是你的情人); 3. Broken (断了) |
| 27 July 2019 | Mainland China | Chengdu | Sichuan Provincial Gymnasium | None | 1. Ready or Not + Knock Knock(叩叩) + Aegean Sea (爱琴海); 2. Love Me a Little Longer (爱我久一点); 3. The Ninth Night (第九夜); 4. After Winter's Gone (过完冬季); 5. Stock on You (偷心贼) + I Feel Good + Feelin' Good (好心情); 6. Beautiful Bimbo (美丽笨女人); 7. Reflection (自己); 8. From Today to Forever (今天到永远)/ See You Again (再见一面) / Waiting for Love; 9. What's Up? (4 Non Blondes cover); 10. Every Moment of Love (爱你在每一天); 11. Missing You in 365 Days (想你的365天); 12. Dao Ma Dan (刀马旦); 13. You Are My Superman (你是我的Superman); 14. So Crazy; 15. You Do Love Me (你是爱我的); 16. Do You Want My Love; 17. True Lover (真情人); 18. Each Time I Think of You (intro) (每一次想你) + Yesterday's Passion (往日情) + All I Want to Say (暗示) + The Answer (答案) + A Love Before Time (月光爱人); 19. You & I; Encore: 1. Sunny Day(intro) / Stay with Me / DiDaDi; 2. Broken (断了); 3. I'm Still Your Lover (我依然是你的情人) |
| 17 August 2019 | Mainland China | Foshan | Foshan International Sports Cultural Performing Center | None | 1. Ready or Not + Knock Knock (叩叩) + Aegean Sea (爱琴海); 2. Longing to See You (真的想见你); 3. After Winter's Gone (过完冬季); 4. Stock on You (偷心贼) + I Feel Good + Feelin' Good (好心情); 5. Before I Fall in Love; 6. Beautiful Bimbo (美丽笨女人); 7. Each Time I Think of You (每一次想你) + Be Careful Next Time (下次小心) + Mirror (魔镜) + See You Again (再见一面); 8. What's Up? (4 Non Blondes cover); 9. Every Moment of Love (爱你在每一天); 10. Missing You in 365 Days (想你的365天); 11. Dao Ma Dan (刀马旦); 12. You Are My Superman (你是我的Superman); 13. So Crazy; 14. You Do Love Me (你是爱我的); 15. True Lover (真情人); 16. Each Time I Think of You (intro) (每一次想你) + Yesterday's Passion (往日情) + All I Want to Say (暗示) + The Answer (答案) + A Love Before Time (月光爱人); 17. You & I; Encore: 1. Sunny Day + Stay with Me + DiDaDi; 2. Broken (断了); 3. I'm Still Your Lover (我依然是你的情人) |
| 26 October 2019 | Mainland China | Macao | Cotai Arena | None | |
| 14 December 2019 | Mainland China | Nanjing | Nanjing Youth Olympic Games Sports Park | None | |
| 22 December 2019 | United States | Uncasville | Mohegan Sun Arena | None | |
| 28 December 2019 | United States | Las Vegas | MGM Grand Garden Arena | None | |

== See also ==
- List of best-selling albums in Taiwan

| Preceded by Han Hong | Winner of I Am a Singer; Season 4; 2016 | Succeeded by Sandy Lam |
