= Wolf Club =

English electro pop band

- Origin: Nottingham, Nottinghamshire, England
- Genres: Synthwave, electropop
- Years active: 2014–present
- Label: My Hart Canyon Records / TimeSlave Recordings / NewRetroWave Records
- Members: Steven Wilcoxson; Chris Paul-Martin; Tim Hartwell

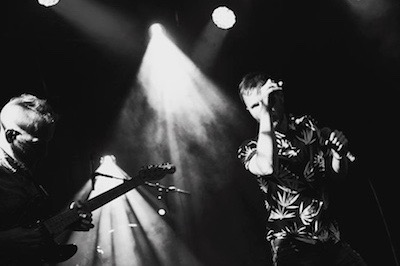
Live at Rock City

Wolf Club (often stylized as W O L F C L U B) is an English electropop band from Nottingham.

== History ==
Formed in 2014, the band consists of Steven Wilcoxson (producer, guitarist and songwriter) and Chris Paul-Martin (producer, vocalist, and songwriter). They are often joined on stage by DJ Tim Hartwell.

They released their debut album W O L F C L U B in June 2017.

In 2018, the band signed with Time Slave Recordings and released the album Chasing The Storm in June 2018. "Summer Lights" was the first single released and became number 2 in the Amazing Radio chart. Later in 2018, the band signed with New Retro Wave Recordings, and in November 2018 released their third studio album Infinity, which was the highest selling album in the world on Bandcamp in its first week of release.

Wolf Club have been played on BBC Radio multiple times.

In 2019 the band was to play the main stage at the Y Not Festival. The band released their 4th studio album Frontiers on Friday 2 August, which debuted at number 7 in the Billboard electronic chart. The album peaked at number 8 in the UK and number 9 in the US iTunes downloads chart respectively.

In 2020 the band released RUNAWAYS. The album reached number 2 on the electronic iTunes chart. 2 tracks from this album "RUSH" and "REBELS" were written for the movie Infamous starring Bella Thorne and written and directed by Joshua Caldwell. The movie contained 6 tracks by Wolf Club.

== Discography ==
Title	Album details
W O L F C L U B	Released: 1 June 2017; Label: My Hart Canyon Records
Chasing the Storm	Released: 7 June 2018; Label: TimeSlave Recordings
Infinity	Released: 16 November 2018; Label: NewRetroWave Records
Frontiers	Released: 2 August 2019; Label: NewRetroWave Records
Runaways	Released: 1 May 2020; Label: NewRetroWave Records
Just Drive (Part 1)	Released: 5 March 2021; Label: NewRetroWave Records
Just Drive (Part 2)	Released: 30 July 2021; Label: NewRetroWave Records
Desert Hearts	Released: 14 July 2023; Label: NewRetroWave Records
Canyons	Released: 19 July 2024; Label: NewRetroWave Records
Lake Street	Released: 20 June 2025; Label: NewRetroWave Records
City of Once	Released: 31 July 2026; Label: NewRetroWave Records
