= Highdee Kuan =

American actress

Highdee Kuan is a German-Chinese American actress, writer and director from The Netherlands. Although born in San Francisco, she studied classical ballet at The Dutch Royal Conservatory. She portrayed Alexis in the 2024 Netflix series The Brothers Sun. alongside Michelle Yeoh. She played Woody Harrelson's daughter, Olive Harrelson, in the 2026 Apple TV Series, 'Brothers', alongside Matthew McConaughey and Holland Taylor. Currently she resides in New York and Mexico City.

== Personal life ==
Kuan was born in San Francisco. She grew up in the Netherlands. She is fluent in English, Dutch and Mandarin. She is the granddaughter of Yu-Chian Kuan, a Chinese-born German sinologist.

== Filmography ==
=== Film ===
| Year | Title | Role | Notes |
|---|---|---|---|
| 2016 | Run for the Truth | Sofie | Short film |
| 2019 | Just Another Day | Train | Short film |
| 2020 | Proximity | Sara | |
| 2023 | Fear the Night | Rose | |
| 2023 | Welcome to Redville | Toni | |

=== Television ===
| Year | Title | Role | Notes |
|---|---|---|---|
| 2017 | The Young and the Restless | Robin | 1 episode |
| 2018 | Vida | Shop Girl | 1 episode |
| 2019 | You | Luna | 1 episode |
| 2020 | This Is Us | Sasha | 1 episode |
| 2023 | Quantum Leap | Mallory Yang | 1 episode |
| 2024 | The Brothers Sun | Alexis | 8 episodes |
| 2024 | Interior Chinatown | Anna | 2 episodes |
| 2026 | Brothers | | 8 episodes |
