= Brittany Ishibashi =

American actress

- Occupation: Actress
- Years active: 1999–present

Brittany Ishibashi is an American actress. She has had starring television roles on Political Animals, Supernatural, Runaways, and Brothers. Ishibashi has had roles in films such as Teenage Mutant Ninja Turtles: Out of the Shadows.

== Early life and education ==
Ishibashi comes from a family of entertainers. Her father, Gerald Ishibashi, is a concert promoter and musician. Her mother, Lisa Ishibashi, is a singer. Her grandmother, Mary Nomura, is a singer who became known as the songbird of Manzanar.

She attended Jordan Elementary School, Santiago Middle School, and El Modena High School. She majored in theater at the University of California Los Angeles (UCLA).

== Career ==
Ishibashi's first big break came when J. J. Abrams cast her in Felicity just out of high school. She continued her formal education at UCLA School of Theater, Film and Television while continuing to build her resume outside of classes. Ishibashi has been consistently working ever since, with recurring roles and guest appearances in over three dozen television shows, including The Office, Grey's Anatomy, and Supernatural. After a debut at Comic-Con, Ishibashi reprised her role as Maggie Zeddmore in the Supernatural spin-off Ghostfacers, which has developed a global fan following. She has also worked on nearly two dozen films and multimedia projects, under the direction of such creatives as Joan Scheckel, Robert Redford, and Danny DeVito.

Ishibashi is best known for her role as Anne Ogami on USA Network's Golden Globe and Emmy-nominated series, Political Animals. Ishibashi was next seen in the original Netflix series, Grace and Frankie, and starring in Wong Fu Productions first feature film, Everything Before Us, released June 3, 2015.

In early 2015, Ishibashi launched her production company, Mana Moments, with a focus on comedic, female driven content.

Ishibashi played Karai in Teenage Mutant Ninja Turtles: Out of the Shadows, the sequel to Teenage Mutant Ninja Turtles, released in theaters on June 3, 2016.

In 2017, Ishibashi joined the cast of the Hulu original series Runaways as Tina Minoru.

== Filmography ==
=== Film ===
| Year | Title | Role | Notes |
|---|---|---|---|
| 1999 | After One Cigarette | Michiko | Short film |
| 2004 | November | Lim | |
| 2004 | Stand Up For Justice | Ruby | Short film |
| 2005 | Undiscovered | Trapeze Instructor | |
| 2005 | Enter the Dragonfly | Teacher | Short film |
| 2005 | Another Part of Town | Brittany | Short film |
| 2006 | The Heart Specialist | Translator | |
| 2007 | Primal Doubt | Carla | TV movie |
| 2007 | Lions for Lambs | | |
| 2008 | Stone and Ed | Suzy | |
| 2008 | Eagle Eye | Rachel's Friend | |
| 2009 | Uncorked | Renee | TV movie |
| 2010 | The Bannen Way | Stiletto | |
| 2010 | Revenge of the Bridesmaids | Bitsy | TV movie |
| 2011 | Keeping Up with the Randalls | Macy | TV movie |
| 2012 | Cupid, Inc. | Rita | TV movie |
| 2014 | The Harvesting | Bree | |
| 2015 | Everything Before Us | Sara | |
| 2016 | Teenage Mutant Ninja Turtles: Out of the Shadows | Karai | |
| 2018 | Surviving Theatre | Liz | Short film |
| 2020 | Over the Moon | Blue Lunette | Voice |

=== Television ===
| Year | Title | Role | Notes |
|---|---|---|---|
| 1999 | Felicity | Advisee | Episode: "Sophomoric" |
| 2000 | Charmed | Receptionist | Episode: "Primrose Empath" |
| 2001 | That's Life | Student | Episode: "Sex In The Suburbs" |
| 2002 | The Division | Allison | Episode: "This Thing Called Love" |
| 2002 | Off Centre | Allison | Episode: "The Deflower Half Hour" |
| 2002 | Angel | Vivian | Episode: "The House Always Wins" |
| 2003 | Miss Match | Jilted Elf | Episode: "Santa Baby" |
| 2005 | 24 | Melanie | Episode: "Day 4: 7:00 am – 8:00 am" |
| 2005–2006 | E-Ring | Ashley Nakahino | 5 episodes |
| 2005 | Grey's Anatomy | Talia | Episode: "Let It Be" |
| 2006 | In Justice | Sou-Min | 2 episodes |
| 2006 | CSI: Crime Scene Investigation | Pizza Gal | Episode: "Burn Out" |
| 2006 | The Office | Cindy | Episode: "A Benihana Christmas" |
| 2007 | Veronica Mars | Emi | Episode: "Show Me the Monkey" |
| 2007 | HBO Voyeur Series | The Temptress | Miniseries |
| 2007 | Journeyman | Melissa Waters | Episode: "The Year Of The Rabbit" |
| 2007 | Nip/Tuck | Girl in club | Episode: "Carly Summers" |
| 2007 | Notes from the Underbelly | Receptionist | Episode: "The Blackout" |
| 2008 | Supernatural | Maggie Zeddmore | 2 episodes (1 uncredited) |
| 2008 | The Madness of Jane | Soraya Jindal | Main cast |
| 2008 | No Heroics | Jill | Episode: "Supergroupie" |
| 2009 | Roommates | Heather | Episode: "The Game Night" |
| 2009 | My Boys | Emily | Episode: "Friends of Friends" |
| 2010 | Desperate Housewives | Mimi | Episode: "Excited and Scared" |
| 2010 | Oh Those Lips | Salome | Web short |
| 2011 | House, M.D. | Ms. Corwin | Episode: "Two Stories" |
| 2011 | Fairly Legal | Julie Chang | Episode: "My Best Friend's Pre-nup" |
| 2011 | Parenthood | Grace Woo | 2 episodes |
| 2011 | The Mentalist | Ariel Martin | Episode: "Rhapsody in Red" |
| 2012 | Blackout | Meghan | Episode: "Part 1" |
| 2012 | Political Animals | Anne Ogami | Miniseries; Main cast |
| 2013 | Emily Owens M.D. | Dr. Kelly Hamata | 5 episodes |
| 2013 | Bones | Emma Pak | Episode: "The Cheat in the Retreat" |
| 2014 | Mind Games | Karen | Episode: "N.D.E." |
| 2014 | Castle | Saya Ozu | Episode: "The Way of the Ninja" |
| 2015–2022 | Grace and Frankie | Erica | 7 episodes |
| 2015 | Satisfaction | Satomi Kaneshireo | Episode: "...Through Bondage" |
| 2015 | Major Crimes | Colleen Dickerhoof | Episode: "Reality Check" |
| 2016 | Young and Hungry | Ella | Episode: "Young & Rachael Ray" |
| 2016–2017 | This Is Us | Tracy | 2 episodes |
| 2017 | Teenage Mutant Ninja Turtles | Akemi (voice), Jorōgumo (voice) | 2 episodes |
| 2017–2019 | Runaways | Tina Minoru / Magistrate's Daughter | Main cast |
| 2018 | The Affair | Jules | Episode: "407" |
| 2019 | Hawaii Five-0 | Tamiko Masuda | 4 episodes |
| 2019 | Mickey Mouse Mixed-Up Adventures | Kiku (voice) | |
| 2019 | The Unicorn | Lena | Episode: "Three Men Out" |
| 2021 | Good Girls | School Mom | Episode: "One Night in Bangkok" |
| 2021 | Hallmark's Every Time a Bell Rings | Emily | |
| 2022 | Tom Swift | Claire Cormier | Recurring role |
| 2022 | Oni: Thunder God's Tale | Amaten (voice) | |
| 2026 | Brothers | Joy Harrelson | Main role, upcoming series |
| 2026 | Scrubs | Psychosis Patient | Episode: My Best Friend’s Barbecue |

=== Web ===
| Year | Title | Role | Notes |
|---|---|---|---|
| 2008 | Imaginary Bitches | Brittany | Episode: "A Spiritual Bitch-Bath" |
| 2010–2011 | Ghostfacers | Maggie Zeddmore | 11 episodes |

== See also ==
- Japanese Americans in Los Angeles
