= Bobby Eilbacher =

American television actor (born 1963/64)

- Born: Robert Charles Eilbacher II; 1963 or 1964 (age 61–62); Los Angeles, California, U.S.
- Occupation: Former child actor
- Years active: 1970 – 1977
- Relatives: Lisa Eilbacher (sister), Cindy Eilbacher (sister)

Robert Charles "Bobby" Eilbacher (born 1963 or 1964) is an American former child actor, best known as one of the earliest in the long list of actors portraying Days of Our Lives character Mike Horton. (Note: Long regarded as literally the first to do so, this was shown not to be the case in 1995, when Maureen Russell's Days of Our Lives: A Complete History of the Long-Running Soap Opera listed five pre-Eilbacher editions, all of whom appeared within the year and a half preceding his July 1970 debut. However, of those five, the first two, Kyle Puerner and Wade Holdsworth (both of whom, according to IMDb, were born in 1968, and neither of whom ever 'acted' again), were mere infants in their respective 1969 appearances, while the next two—2- and 3-year-old Craig Bond and Brian Andrews, respectively—embodied Micheal's toddler incarnations. In fact, it was only Eilbacher's immediate predecessor, Eddie Rayden, who was roughly his contemporary. That said, given the fact that—again according to IMDb's calculations to date—Rayden's tenure consisted of five appearances in two months—specifically, April 13 through June 12, 1970—while Eilbacher appeared seven times in July alone, it is easy to see how he might well have become the first of DOOL's many Mikes likely to be recalled decades after the fact.) He also co-starred with Elizabeth Ashley in the 1970 season premiere of The Virginian, and with singer Jennifer Warnes—making her professional acting debut—in 1971's premiere episode of The Bold Ones: The New Doctors.

== Early life and career ==
A native of Los Angeles, California, Eilbacher is the fourth of five children born to Beverly (née McCann) and Robert Charles Eilbacher. He is the younger brother of former actresses Lisa and Cindy Eilbacher.

For many years after his brief screen acting career had played out, Eilbacher's 1970 debut was also regarded as an even more notable screen first: the first-ever appearance of longstanding Days of Our Lives character, Dr. Mike Horton. However, in the late 1990s, with the publication of book-length studies devoted entirely to the series, the existence of at least four earlier—and considerably younger—performers (two being under one year of age and the other two, 2 and 3½, respectively), came to light, as well as that of one prior post-toddler Mike.

Eilbacher's first publicized screen appearance came in September 1970, when he co-starred with Elizabeth Ashley in "The West vs. Colonel MacKenzie". The final season season premiere of what had, for the previous eight years, been known simply as The Virginian, this episode also marked the respective debuts of the show's new title (i.e. The Men from Shiloh), theme song (composed by Ennio Morricone), and—as Col. MacKenzie—leading man Stewart Granger. Eilbacher is cast as Petey Andrews, the now catatonic witness to his own father's recent lynching at the hands of seemingly misinformed members of the local cattlemen's association. Petey is eventually taken under the wing of his father's sister (Ashley), who, in conjunction with fellow newcomer MacKenzie, attempts to clear her brother's name and bring the family some closure.

Moving from one iconic western to another, Eilbacher next appeared in the January 4, 1971 episode of Gunsmoke, "Captain Sligo". He portrays young Tim Burney, whose widowed mother Josephine Burney—Salome Jens—is courted by neighboring ranch owner—and erstwhile whaler—Sligo, played by erstwhile big screen whaler, Richard Basehart. (Note: Basehart being the Ishmael seen and heard in John Huston's 1956 adaptation of Herman Melville's Moby Dick.)

Arguably the highest-profile performance of Eilbacher's career came in September 1971, as part of the highly publicized screen acting debut of singer Jennifer—aka Jennifer Warnes—in "Broken Melody", the season premiere of The Bold Ones: The New Doctors. Featuring Warnes as Gaby Barr, a recording star suddenly gone deaf, the episode co-stars Eilbacher as Johnny Wilson, her very likely abused and undeniably acting out fellow patient, with both under the care of Dr. Ted Stuart (series regular John Saxon). Over time, the initially at-odds pair come to be a source of mutual comfort and healing (an outcome unapologetically spoiled by the vastly different photo and descriptions that promoted the episode's March 1972 rebroadcast). Regarding his performance, Variety's Morry Roth wrote that "Eilbacher [...] as a battered child proved W. C. Fields' admonitions on the dangers of competing with kids on camera." (Note: Presumably referring to the quote often attributed to Fields, "Never work with children or animals.")

Following an uncredited and negligible role in the CBS made-for-TV western horror film Black Noon and a minor one in the CBS series Emergency!, Eilbacher had one last high-profile appearance, made on his second Emergency appearance, on the episode entitled "Zero". Portraying Tommy Mannering, he is rescued from an apartment ledge while seemingly on the verge of suicide, a supposition angrily disputed by the boy's mother, portrayed by a young Mariette Hartley.

Eilbacher's final appearance came on "Children of the Gods", episode no. 4 of The Fantastic Journey, the time travel-themed sci-fi series that constituted NBC's soon-to-be-canceled 1977 mid-season replacement (a failure likely hastened by being slotted between Welcome Back, Kotter and The Waltons). Eilbacher plays Sigma, an escapee from a children-only community led by well-intentioned but dictatorial and bullying teenager Alpha. Attempts by some of the travelers to aid Sigma soon lead to their collective recapture and, eventually, threatened execution. Repeated efforts to reason with Alpha, followed by a seemingly futile physical challenge issued by 13-year-old, Scott Jordan Ike Eisenmann—eventually echoed by the like-aged Sigma and then an avalanche of similarly discontented youngsters—ultimately lead to a much more equitable status quo and a satisfying outcome for all concerned.

== Filmography ==
- Days of Our Lives (7 episodes, 1970-1971) (TV)
- The Virginian (TV)
  - Ep. 9.1 "The West vs. Colonel MacKenzie" (1970) – as Petey
- Gunsmoke (TV)
  - Ep. 16.16 "Captain Sligo" (1971) – Tim Burney
- The Bold Ones: The New Doctors (TV)
  - Ep 6.1 "Broken Melody" (1971) – Johnny Wilson
- Black Noon (1971) (TV movie) – Boy
- Emergency! (TV)
  - Ep. 1.3 "Cook's Tour" (1972) – kid in handcuffs
  - Ep. 3.10 "Zero" (1973) – Tommy Mannering
- Frankenstein (1973) (TV movie) – Boy
- Female Artillery (1973) (TV movie) – John Townsend
- The Lie (1973) (TV movie) – Henry
- ABC Afternoon Playbreak (1 episode, 1973) (TV)
- After School Special (1 episode, 1974) (TV)
- The Hanged Man (1974) (TV movie) – Benjamin Gault
- The Bob Newhart Show (TV)
  - Series Ep. 58 "Life is a Hamburger" (1974) – Ricky Rasmussen
  - Series ep. 80 "What's It All About, Albert" (1975) – David
- Petrocelli (TV)
  - Ep. "A Lonely Victim" (1975) – Billy Thorpe
- Hugo the Hippo (1975) – Additional English-version voice
- The Fantastic Journey (TV)
  - Ep. 1.4 "Children of the Gods" (1977) – Sigma
