= Be Somebody =

Be Somebody may refer to:

- Be Somebody (2016 film), an American romantic comedy film
- Be Somebody (2021 film), a Chinese comedy mystery film
- "Be Somebody", a song by 3 Doors Down from the 2005 album Seventeen Days
- "Be Somebody", a 2020 song by Dillon Francis featuring Evie Irie
- "Be Somebody", a song by Fort Minor from the 2005 album The Rising Tied
- "Be Somebody", a song by Kings of Leon from the 2008 album Only by the Night
- "Be Somebody", a song by the Enemy from the 2009 album Music for the People
- "Be Somebody", a song by Thousand Foot Krutch from the 2012 album The End is Where We Begin

== See also ==
- Be Somebody... or Be Somebody's Fool!, a 1984 motivational video helmed by Mr. T
