= Mending the Line =

- Directed by: Joshua Caldwell
- Written by: Stephen Camelio
- Produced by: Kelly McKendry; Scott MacLeod; Carl Effenson; Stephen Camelio; Joshua Caldwell
- Starring: Brian Cox; Sinqua Walls; Perry Mattfeld; Patricia Heaton; Wes Studi
- Cinematography: Eve M. Cohen
- Edited by: Will Torbett
- Music by: Bill Brown
- Distributed by: Blue Fox Entertainment
- Release dates: September 29, 2022 (Woodstock); June 9, 2023
- Running time: 122 minutes
- Country: United States
- Language: English
- Box office: $379,890

Mending the Line is a 2022 American drama film written by Stephen Camelio, directed by Joshua Caldwell and starring Brian Cox, Sinqua Walls, Perry Mattfeld, Patricia Heaton and Wes Studi.

== Plot ==
A Marine wounded in Afghanistan returns home to the US but struggles deeply with the trauma of war. The memories of fallen friends haunt him, and he carries the weight of survivor's guilt, along with physical injuries that make daily life difficult. He is sent to a V.A. facility in Montana where he meets a Vietnam Vet who teaches him how to fly fish as a way of dealing with his PTSD and they forge a friendship that changes both of their lives.

== Cast ==
- Brian Cox as Ike Fletcher
- Sinqua Walls as Colter
- Perry Mattfeld as Lucy
- Patricia Heaton as Dr. Burke
- Wes Studi as Harrison

== Production ==
In August 2021, it was announced that Cox and Walls would star in the film.

Filming occurred in Montana in September 2021.

== Release ==
The film premiered at the Woodstock Film Festival on September 29, 2022. It was also shown at the San Diego International Film Festival on October 22, 2022. Then it was released in theaters on June 9, 2023, by Blue Fox Entertainment, and on demand on September 26, 2023, by Sony Pictures Home Entertainment. The movie arrived on Netflix on March 23, 2024. The film shot up to No. 1 on the Netflix US Top Ten where it remained for five days and maintained its overall position in the Top Ten for the first week of its release. The film also cracked the Netflix Global Top Ten at No. 10 despite only being available in the US.

== Reception ==
On the review aggregator website Rotten Tomatoes, 77% of 22 critics' reviews are positive, with an average rating of 6.7/10. Metacritic, which uses a weighted average, assigned the film a score of 56 out of 100, based on 4 critics, indicating "mixed or average" reviews.

Owen Gleiberman of Variety gave the film a positive review and wrote that it "has a rote TV-movie look and a few bland and rambling passages. But it delivers a truth about those who have served, about the reality of the demons that can linger in them, that’s tough and moving."

Gary Goldstein of the Los Angeles Times also gave the film a positive review and wrote, "That said, the movie is worth a look for its lovely and magical fly-fishing sequences and stirring Big Sky vistas (shout out to cinematographer Eve Cohen), as well as its strong cast..."

Bill Goodykoontz of The Arizona Republic awarded the film three stars out of five and wrote, "But through its setting and performances, “Mend the Line” has just enough going for it to recommend it."

== Award ==
The film won the Valor Award at the San Diego International Film Festival.
