= Sinqua Walls =

American actor (born 1985)

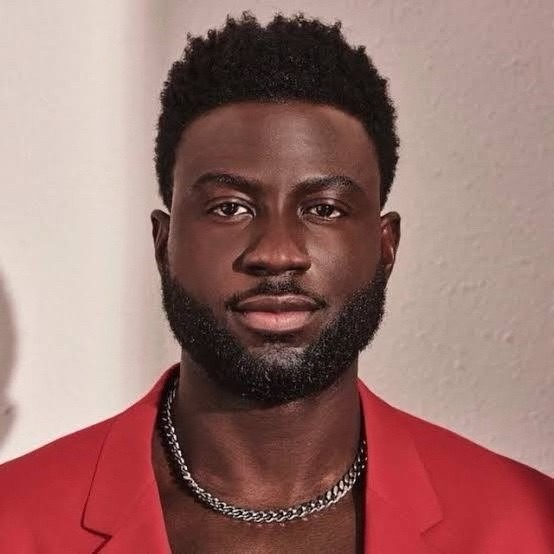
- Born: Louisiana, U.S.
- Education: University of San Francisco (BA)
- Occupation: Actor
- Years active: 2007–present

Sinqua Walls is an American actor known for his work in film and television. His work includes the feature films White Men Can’t Jump (2023), Carry-On, and Man of Tomorrow, as well as the Peacock limited series Fight Night: The Million Dollar Heist. Carry-On became one of Netflix’s most-watched films, recording 172.1 million views during its first 91 days of release. Earlier in his career, Walls starred as Don Cornelius in BET’s American Soul and appeared in the television series Power, Teen Wolf as Boyd, Once Upon a Time, and Friday Night Lights.

== Early life and education ==
Walls was born in Louisiana and moved with his family to Marina del Rey, California, during childhood. He attended El Segundo High School before enrolling at the University of San Francisco, where he studied theatre and film while playing NCAA Division I basketball for the San Francisco Dons men’s basketball team. After graduating in 2007, he pursued a career in acting.

== Career ==
Walls began his acting career with guest and recurring roles in television series including Lincoln Heights, CSI: Crime Scene Investigation, Grey’s Anatomy, Chuck, Blue Mountain State, Friday Night Lights, The Secret Life of the American Teenager, Necessary Roughness, and Pair of Kings.

He gained wider recognition portraying Vernon Boyd in MTV’s supernatural drama Teen Wolf before appearing as Sir Lancelot in ABC’s Once Upon a Time. He later played Shawn Stark in the Starz crime drama Power and starred as Terrance “Lil Ray” Baltimore in VH1’s The Breaks.

In 2017, Walls was cast in Clint Eastwood’s biographical drama The 15:17 to Paris, released the following year.

In 2018, Walls was cast as Don Cornelius in BET’s drama series American Soul, portraying the creator and host of Soul Train. The series ran for two seasons and marked his first leading role in a scripted television series.

Walls subsequently expanded into feature films with roles in Resort to Love, Nanny: Nanny premiered at the 2022 Sundance Film Festival, where it became the first horror film to win the U.S Democratic Grand Jury Prize, Alice, The Blackening, and Mending the Line.

In 2023, he starred as Kamal Allen in White Men Can’t Jump, the remake of the 1992 sports comedy.

In 2024, Walls appeared in the Peacock limited series Fight Night: The Million Dollar Heist and the Netflix action thriller Carry-On. Carry-On became one of Netflix’s most-watched films, recording 172.1 million views during its first 91 days of release.

In 2026, it was announced that Walls had joined the cast of James Gunn’s Man of Tomorrow, the sequel to Superman (2025), in an undisclosed role.

== Filmography ==
=== Film ===
Year	Title	Role	Notes
2007	Choose Connor	Voter	
2009	The Second Half	Harlan	Short film
2011	From the Head	Santos	
2011	Shark Night	Malik Henry	
2014	Believe Me	Tyler	
2016	Past Forward	Man #3	Short film
2018	The 15:17 to Paris	Marine	
2019	Otherhood	Matt Walker	
2021	Resort to Love	Caleb King	
2022	Nanny	Malik	
2022	Alice	Joseph	
2022	The Blackening	Nnamdi	
2022	Mending the Line	John Colter	
2023	White Men Can't Jump	Kamal Allen	
2024	Carry-On	Jason Noble	
2027	Man of Tomorrow	TBA	

=== Television ===
Year	Title	Role	Notes
2007	Lincoln Heights	Desmond	2 episodes
2008	Chuck	Student	Episode: "Chuck Versus the Ex"
2008	Friday Night Lights	Jamarcus Hall	9 episodes
2010–2012	Pair of Kings	Pierce	4 episodes
2010	Grey's Anatomy	Tom Kates	Episode: "Blink"
2010	Blue Mountain State	Batman Barstow	2 episodes
2010	Savage Country	Noah	Television film
2011	CSI: Crime Scene Investigation	Paramedic Sam Rill	Episode: "CSI Down"
2011–2012	The Secret Life of the American Teenager	Daniel	13 episodes
2012–2015	Once Upon a Time	Sir Lancelot	6 episodes
2012–2013	Teen Wolf	Vernon Boyd	15 episodes
2013	Necessary Roughness	Devon Langer	Episode: "Swimming with Sharks"
2014–2015	Power	Shawn	18 episodes
2017	The Breaks	Terrance "Lil Ray" Baltimore	Main role (season 1)
2017	Tales	Marcus	Episode 7
2019–2020	American Soul	Don Cornelius	Main role
2024	Fight Night: The Million Dollar Heist	McKinley 'Mac' Rogers	Side Role
