= Brothers (2026 TV series) =

American comedy TV series

- Genre: Comedy
- Created by: Matthew McConaughey; Woody Harrelson; David West Read; Lee Eisenberg
- Showrunner: Lee Eisenberg
- Starring: Woody Harrelson; Matthew McConaughey; Natalie Martinez; Brittany Ishibashi; Nolan Almeida; Ella Grace Helton; Noah Carganilla; Highdee Kuan; Oona Yaffe; Holland Taylor
- Theme music composer: Rick Davies & Roger Hodgson
- Opening theme: "Give a Little Bit"
- Composers: Nick Sena & Zachary Dawes
- Country of origin: United States
- Original language: English
- No. of seasons: 1
- No. of episodes: 8

Production
- Executive producers: Lee Eisenberg; Matthew McConaughey; Woody Harrelson; Natalie Sandy; David West Read; Trish Hofmann; Bill Bost; Jason Winer; David Ellison; Dana Goldberg; Matt Thunell; Brett Baer; David Finkel; Jeremy Plager
- Producer: Akshara Sekar
- Cinematography: Gavin Kelly; Bobby Bukowski; Chris Teague
- Editors: Jamie Kennedy; Tony Orcena; Arge O'Neal; Liza Cardinale; Sara Nell
- Running time: 23–33 minutes
- Production companies: Just Keep Livin Productions; Children at Play; Piece of Work Entertainment; Paramount Television Studios

Original release
- Network: Apple TV
- Release: September 23, 2026 – present

Brothers is an American comedy television series created by Matthew McConaughey & Woody Harrelson, Lee Eisenberg, and David West Read. The series premiered on September 23, 2026.

== Premise ==
The series chronicles a fictional version of the lives of actors Matthew McConaughey and Woody Harrelson, whose strong friendship is put to the test when they decide to live together with their families at McConaughey's Texas ranch after Harrelson's daughter's wedding falls apart. While at the ranch, McConaughey and Harrelson uncover a family secret that the two might be brothers.

== Cast ==
=== Main ===
- Woody Harrelson as himself
- Matthew McConaughey as himself
- Natalie Martinez as Valentina, Matthew's wife
- Brittany Ishibashi as Joy, Woody's wife
- Nolan Almeida as Wyatt, Matthew and Valentina's eldest son
- Ella Grace Helton as Clara, Matthew and Valentina's daughter
- Noah Carganilla as River, Matthew and Valentina's younger son
- Highdee Kuan as Olive, Woody and Joy's eldest daughter
- Oona Yaffe as Kai, Woody and Joy's younger, adopted daughter
- Holland Taylor as Ma Mac, Matthew's mother

=== Recurring ===
- Lisa Gilroy as Gwen Hillcrest Barnes-Davies, the campaign manager that Matthew hires in his run for governor of Texas
- Skyler Gisondo as Jimmy

=== Guest ===
- Jeff Kober as TJ Travis, one of a pair of criminal brothers who have a score to settle with Woody about his father Clive
- Barry Corbin as Carl Travis, the other member of a pair of criminal brothers who have a score to settle with Woody about his father Clive
- Richard Robichaux as Scottie, the operator of an animal shelter that Woody adopts a dog from
- Jimmy Fowlie as Brad, the customer support representative for Roots DNA Testing
- Will Greenberg as Officer Anderson
- Kevin Daniels as Roger
- Dax Shepard as himself
- Brian Williams as himself
- Caroline Aaron as Perry
- Jimmy Fallon as himself
- Joe Rogan as himself
- Sally Hernandez as herself
- Karl Stefanovic as himself
- Sarah Abo as herself
- Nodar Meladze as himself
- Ali Velshi as himself
- Rachel Maddow as herself
- Stephanie Ruhle as herself
- Symone Sanders-Townsend as herself

== Production ==
=== Development ===
It was announced in March 2023 that Apple TV+ had ordered the series, with Matthew McConaughey and Woody Harrelson set to star in and executive produce.

In August 2025, Paramount Television Studios had assumed production of the series following the merger of Skydance Television's parent company Skydance Media with Paramount Global into Paramount Skydance.

The idea of Harrelson and McConaughey potentially being brothers is derived from McConaughey's mother claiming to be intimate with Harrelson's father around the time of his conception. No DNA testing was made at the time to determine the credibility of this theory.

=== Casting ===
Casting announcements on the series were made in February 2025, with Holland Taylor, Natalie Martinez and Brittany Ishibashi joining the cast, and Jason Winer hired to direct multiple episodes of the series. In March, the series was titled Brothers, with Oona Yaffe, Highdee Kuan, Nolan Almeida, Ella Grace Helton and Noah Carganilla cast to portray McConaughey and Harrelson's children.

=== Filming ===
Principal photography for the series began in November 2024, with scenes shot in Austin, Texas. Production was suspended and the cast sent home in June 2025, after disagreements over the direction of the series saw West Read leave the project. Lee Eisenberg entered negotiations to step in as showrunner.

== Episodes ==
No.	Title	Directed by	Written by	Original release date
1	"On the Road"	Trent O'Donnell	Teleplay by : Lee Eisenberg; Story by : Matthew McConaughey & Woody Harrelson and David West Read and Lee Eisenberg	September 23, 2026
After his daughter Olive calls off her wedding engagement, Woody Harrelson leaves his family's house and drives to Matthew McConaughey's ranch near Austin, with the rest of his family following. Matthew struggles to write a speech commemorating his late father, James "Big Mac" McConaughey, for his high school. Woody drags him out under the guise of having one drink, which leads to a car ride with a TMZ photographer while Matthew manages to write a perfect version of the speech, and a visit to a rodeo, where Matthew's phone containing the only copy is destroyed by a bull. After an argument, the two reconcile, and Matthew gives an improvised speech the next morning. Meanwhile, Matthew's mother, "Ma Mac", tells Woody that she had a relationship with Woody's father, Clive, implying that Matthew and Woody could be half-brothers. With Woody initially excited to tell Matthew, Matthew announces his plan to run for governor of Texas and asks Woody to stay on as his adviser, and Woody keeps Ma Mac's revelation to himself for the time being, realizing it may be hard to process due to Matthew's grief around his father.
2	"The Hunt"	Trent O'Donnell	Mike Jones & Nick Sherman	September 23, 2026
Matthew plans to take his reluctant eldest son Wyatt on a deer hunt for his 16th birthday, and meets with Gwen Hillcrest Barnes-Davies, a campaign manager he hires for his gubernatorial run. Woody visits the Saddle Saloon in Lockhart to ask about his father, and after Olive and Woody's younger, adoptive daughter Kai join the hunt in an act of rebellion, he attempts to sabotage it. While expressing his dissatisfaction to Matthew for undermining the vegan and animal rights principles he raised his children with, Woody accidentally hits a deer with his vehicle, and the family holds an impromptu funeral. Later, a man from the bar lures Woody to a location where two brothers, the Travises, tie him up and demand $191,000 as compounded interest on a 1972 debt of $1,800 that Clive owed them. As one of the Travises' guns misfires and Woody is shot through a travel book, Ma Mac arrives and shoots one of them, rescuing Woody, before warning him that he has started a conflict.
3	"Little Woody"	Trent O'Donnell	Brett Baer & David Finkel	September 30, 2026
Ma Mac tells the injured Woody he must leave the ranch. Matthew, coached by Gwen, begins campaigning but gives a vague answer when a local voter asks about tax policy, and realizes he needs to study the laws. Woody confides in Olive about the possibility that he and Matthew are brothers, and they plan to obtain Matthew's DNA for testing, but Ma Mac attempts to turn Matthew against Woody's family and drive them out. To win over the McConaugheys, Woody brings home an adopted puppy that the family quickly adores and names "Little Woody" but Matthew orders returned due to high maintenance, after Little Woody rips through Big Mac's college jersey that Ma Mac gave Matthew. As the children are heartbroken, Matthew convinces Scottie, the operator of the animal shelter, to let them take the dog back with a donation to the charity Texans Against Animal Cruelty, while encountering the same potential voter from earlier and showing her that he has since brushed up on the policy. A reconciled Woody promises Ma Mac he will let the matter of his and Matthew's possible fraternity drop, but asks Olive to order the DNA test. Meanwhile, the Travises prepare to enact revenge on Woody.
4	"The Band"	Trent O'Donnell	Danya Jimenez & Hannah McMechan and Lee Eisenberg	October 7, 2026
The two families are stunned to watch a bombastic, over-the-top AI-generated video made by Gwen promoting Matthew's campaign for governor of Texas, emphasizing his acting career and brand image, which Matthew feels misrepresents the political platform and undersells his skills. Matthew's daughter Clara auditions for a school play and expects her famous name to help, but Matthew insists she earn the part through hard work. To make a point, Matthew and Woody decide to perform at a coffee shop under disguises, using Australian and British accents. The gig is poorly received, and after deciding their stardom is well-earned, the two drop their disguises to play a song as themselves that they wrote for True Detective, which they both starred in, and it wins the crowd over. Matthew then tries to make amends with his daughter by donating to her school, though it undermines the lesson he intended. Meanwhile, Olive, who has been searching for a DNA sample from Matthew, gets an unexpected lead when Woody produces a prosthetic nose Matthew wore during the performance, providing biological matter for testing. Olive and Woody are left with a sample that may answer whether Woody and Matthew are brothers. Meanwhile, Olive and Brad, the customer support representative for Roots DNA Testing, quickly hit it off and spontaneously plan a trip to Cabo together.
5	"Valentine's Day"	Jason Winer	David West Read and Lee Eisenberg	October 14, 2026
The episode begins with Woody and Matthew realising they have forgotten Valentine's Day, leading them to improvise and come up with poorly thought-out romantic gestures for their wives, Joy and Valentina. They decide to take each other's advice, as Matthew gives Valentina a signed photograph, hoping to be comedic instead of his traditional sentimental route, while Woody arranges a children's choir to serenade Joy, mainly to outdo Matthew. The wives decide to teach them a lesson, deciding to prank them by having Wyatt arrested at the jewellery shop, as Matthew asked him to go buy a necklace for Val in hopes of solving their Valentine disagreement. Woody and Matthew rush over only to discover that the arrest is a prank. However, on the drive home, they are pulled over by real police officers. Woody and Matthew believe that the prank must still be ongoing and refuse to cooperate, leading to both being arrested. Meanwhile, Wyatt, Kai and Wyatt spend the day together, finally admitting they like each other, initially leaning in to kiss her, which scares her and leads her to punch him, before the two eventually find a quiet moment on the family bus and share a kiss. Back at the police station, Matthew's campaign manager Gwen arranges their release from jail. The family then reunites back at the ranch and Matthew, Woody, Valentina, and Joy celebrate a belated Valentines day where it unexpectedly gets interrupted by Olive's former fiancé, Jimmy, who performs a song with a boombox, hoping to win her back, leaving Olive in a dilemma, questioning whether to reconsider their relationship.
6	"The Dance"	Erin O'Malley	Danya Jimenez & Hannah McMechan	October 21, 2026
Woody comes out of the trailer, greeted by Jimmy, who is now camping in the garden, waiting for Olive to be ready to talk to him. Wyatt then performs a grand gesture inspired by [Dazed and Confused], complete with the car and outfit from the film, which Kai then accepts to go to the school dance with Wyatt. Meanwhile, Olive is avoiding Jimmy and instead focusing on the arrival of Woody's DNA results, which could finally reveal whether Woody and Matthew are biological brothers. The evening is approaching, Kai attempts to do a grand gesture back to Wyatt and shows off her dress, failing miserably as she falls down the stairs to injure her ankle. Matthew and Woody accompany Wyatt and Kai to the school dance as chaperones, and both make the teenagers feel extremely awkward, as Matthew pressures Wyatt to make a move and dance boldly to impress Kai; Woody gives Kai a speech that only pushes her away more, as she feels completely uncomfortable already being a homeschooled child compared to the other students and on crutches, she decides to find a quiet room and hide there. Eventually, Matthew finds her and reassures her that she does not need to change herself to be accepted, encouraging her to enjoy the evening, in which Kai goes and finds Wyatt, and the two share a dance, while Matthew and Woody watch proudly and reflect on their relationship as fathers. Meanwhile, Jimmy and Olive finally talk for the first time, and Olive hears Jimmy out, although their relationship is still left unresolved. After the dance, Woody goes to see Olive, announcing to her that the DNA results have arrived, but ultimately he decides that he shouldn't open them as he knows that Matthew is his brother whether or not a DNA test proves that. He throws the results in the bin and asks Olive to let the matter go, leaving the truth about their biological relationship unresolved.
7	"The Interview"	Erin O'Malley	Alex Cuthbertson & Matt Fusfeld	October 28, 2026
Matthew begins to start his campaign for governor of Texas and prepares for an interview with Brian Williams. Woody is extremely excited and wakes Matthew up in the middle of the night to celebrate, which he refuses; therefore, he makes his way back to the trailer and knocks the sewage pipe, causing sewage to flood the barn where the interview is supposedly happening and leaving a foul stench across the property. Kai takes the rubbish out first thing in the morning, discovers the DNA letter and returns it to the kitchen. As the rest of the family discovers the mess in the morning, Little Woody, the dog, begins eating the sewage before licking Matthew's face, resulting in him developing a severe case of pink eye just hours before his interview. Matthew is determined to go ahead with the interview, much to Woody and Valentina's disapproval. Woody comes up with a plan and sends Olive and Jimmy to collect Brian Williams from the airport and drive him around to keep him occupied and away from the interview. During the drive, Brian seems to offer relationship advice as Olive and Jimmy discuss the harsh realities in their relationship. Back at the ranch, Matthew comes up with a solution and reaches out to a friend, Dax Shephard, to interview him. It seems the DNA letter has been misplaced and put in Dax's folder, where Matthew begins the interview, and then Dax unexpectedly questions Matthew about why his biological father is actually Woody's father, meaning they are half-brothers, leaving Matthew completely blindsided. Everyone is shocked by the results, and Matthew gets up to confront and punch Woody before walking away, leaving their friendship and Matthew's campaign in an uncertain position.
8	"On the Road Again...Again"	Trent O'Donnell	Lee Eisenberg	November 4, 2026
After the revelation that Woody and Matthew are biological half-brothers, Matthew disappears, leaving everyone worried about him. The campaign rally is approaching, and everyone is out looking for him. Woody decides he has had enough and packs up the trailer, deciding ot head for the road with his family. As Woody drives, Joy abruptly gets up to confront her family about their running-away issues, such as Olive running from Jimmy and not accepting that she loves him, and Kai shouldn't run away from Wyatt after the DNA revelation, realising that they are not biologically related, as Kai is adopted. Back at the ranch, Ma Mac finds Matthew hiding in the treehouse that he and his father built in his childhood home and explains that Big Mac knew that Matthew wasn't biologically his son but chose to raise him anyway, as he loved him. Matthew, now reassured. returns to the campaign rally, and Woody publicly apologises; however, the rally is interrupted when Carl and TJ arrive demanding money connected to Woody and Matthew's biological father, Clive. It becomes clear that Matthew's campaign has failed, and he comes third after the public calls it a rage campaign. With the election behind them, Woody suggests that he and Matthew travel to Colorado to visit Clive in prison, and the two brothers set off together.

== Release ==
Brothers premiered on Apple TV on September 23, 2026, with the first two episodes available immediately and the rest debuting on a weekly basis until the season finale on November 4.

== Reception ==
Critics gave the series a mixed reception. On the review aggregator website Rotten Tomatoes, the series holds an approval rating of 56%, based on 41 reviews, with an average of rated reviews of 5.5/10. The website's critics consensus reads, "Wacky, tacky, and just a little too self-involved, McConaughey and Harrelson bring the meta laughs but not much else in this convoluted examination of Brothers." Metacritic, which uses a weighted average, assigned a score of 52 out of 100 based on 25 critics, indicating "mixed or average" reviews. Jack Seale on The Guardian reviewed it to be positive, describing it as "inessential" but enjoyable.
