= Live Wire (film) =

1992 film by Christian Duguay

- Theatrical release poster
- Directed by: Christian Duguay
- Written by: Bart Baker
- Produced by: Suzanne Todd; Marjorie Lewis; Cindy Lovelady; Eric McLeod; David Willis; Bart Baker
- Starring: Pierce Brosnan; Ron Silver; Ben Cross; Lisa Eilbacher
- Cinematography: Jeffrey Jur
- Edited by: Christopher Greenbury
- Music by: Craig Safan
- Distributed by: New Line Cinema
- Release date: May 1, 1992
- Running time: 85 minutes
- Country: United States
- Language: English
- Budget: $9 million

Live Wire is a 1992 American action film directed by Christian Duguay, written by Bart Baker, and starring Pierce Brosnan, Ron Silver, Ben Cross, and Lisa Eilbacher.

The plot revolves around a rash of seemingly inexplicable, explosive spontaneous human combustions and Danny O'Neill (Brosnan), a bomb disposal expert that gets involved and will eventually have to solve the case.

== Plot ==
When a Senator is killed in an explosion, the FBI investigates. The agent in charge is bomb expert Danny O'Neill, who is separated from his wife Terry (due to the accidental drowning of their only child in their pool) and behaving very erratically. Initially the investigation does not reveal the kind of explosive used or even what was used to detonate it. Eventually it is learned that terrorists led by Mikhail Rashid have developed an "invisible" liquid explosive which is activated within the human body (by stomach acid). It also does not help that they have to report to Senator Traveres, the man whom Terry is having an affair with and whom Danny also assaulted.

Later, another senator is killed while riding in a limousine; the limo being driven by one of Rashid's henchmen. The henchman is subsequently struck by a moving car, taken into custody and brought into court, and since he is now considered a risk by Rashid, the judge in the case is slipped the liquid and she spontaneously explodes; the witness is subsequently killed, though O'Neill discovers the cause of the explosions - the chemically enhanced water in the judge's pitcher.

It becomes obvious that the next target is Senator Traveres, so O'Neill, concerned that Terry may become collateral damage, trails his every move. At a fundraiser, Traveres is targeted by Rashid's main henchman, Al-red, who is disguised as a clown. Al-red tries to detonate a fountain filled with the explosive liquid, but O'Neill tackles him, leading to Al-red accidentally swallowing some of the liquid himself. O'Neill subdues Al-red and gets him away from party in a wheelchair just before he explodes. In the aftermath, O'Neill and Terry finally reconcile.

Aware that Traveres is still not safe, O'Neill infiltrates the senator's heavily guarded mansion, at a very convenient time as it is being overrun by the terrorists. O'Neill concocts a cornucopia of home-made weapons, even building bombs using fertilizer found in the kitchen cabinet. All the terrorists are killed except for Rashid, who holds Terry hostage in front of him and Traveres.

Rashid swallows some of the liquid, sealing his fate but intending to bring them all down with him. O'Neill manages to free Terry and send her to safe ground. He and Traveres however are cornered and are thus subsequently forced to jump from the third floor due to Rashid's explosion. Traveres lands on a wrought-iron fence which impales and kills him, though O'Neill survives. A year later, he has a second child with Terry.

== Cast ==
- Pierce Brosnan as Danny O'Neill
- Ron Silver as Senator Frank Traveres
- Ben Cross as Mikhail Rashid
- Lisa Eilbacher as Terry O'Neill
- Tony Plana as Al-red
- Al Waxman as James Garvey
- Brent Jennings as Shane Rogers
- Philip Baker Hall as Senator Thyme
- Norman Burton as Senator Victor
- Lauren Holly as Suzie Bryant - Channel 7 newsreporter (uncredited)

== Production ==
When the film was first announced in June 1990, it was originally set to be the directorial debut of television director John Nicolella with filming slated for September of that year.

== Release ==
The film, which was being prepped as a summer blockbuster at a time when distributor New Line was trying to diversify its movies, was instead released on cable television before receiving a home media release, the film debuted on HBO on September 2, 1992. Live Wire was released on home video on January 13, 1993.

== Reception ==
In 2003, the film was cited in DC Goes to the Movies: A Unique Guide to the Reel Washington as the "best bad movie" set in Washington, D.C.
