= Me and Mom =

- Genre: Detective comedy drama
- Created by: Hal Sitowitz
- Starring: Lisa Eilbacher; Holland Taylor; James Earl Jones
- Theme music composer: Miles Goodman
- Composer: John Cacavas
- Country of origin: United States
- Original language: English
- No. of seasons: 1
- No. of episodes: 6

Production
- Executive producers: Dean Hargrove; Hal Sitowitz
- Producer: S. Bryan Hickox
- Production location: San Francisco
- Running time: 60 minutes
- Production companies: Hal Sitowitz Productions; Viacom

Original release
- Network: ABC
- Release: April 15 – May 17, 1985

Me and Mom is an American detective comedy drama series that aired on ABC from April 5, 1985 to May 17, 1985.

== Premise ==
Set in San Francisco, the series centered on private eye Kate Morgan and her mother Zena Hunnicutt, a wealthy socialite and widow who always meddled in Kate's cases.

== Cast ==
- Lisa Eilbacher as Kate Morgan
- Holland Taylor as Zena Hunnicutt
- James Earl Jones as Lou Garfield

== Episodes ==
No.	Title	Directed by	Written by	Original release date
1	"Pilot"	Bernard L. Kowalski	Marsha Miller	April 5, 1985
2	"Wine, Women and Murder"	Unknown	Unknown	April 12, 1985
3	"Davey ..."	William Asher	Hal Sitowitz	April 19, 1985
4	"Final Cut"	Unknown	Unknown	April 26, 1985
5	"The Murder Game"	Unknown	Unknown	May 10, 1985
6	"A Flawed Affair"	Unknown	Unknown	May 17, 1985

== Bibliography ==
- Tim Brooks and Earle Marsh, The Complete Directory to Prime Time Network and Cable TV Shows 1946–Present, Ninth edition (New York: Ballantine Books, 2007) ISBN 978-0-345-49773-4
