= Joshua Caldwell =

American film director, screenwriter, and producer

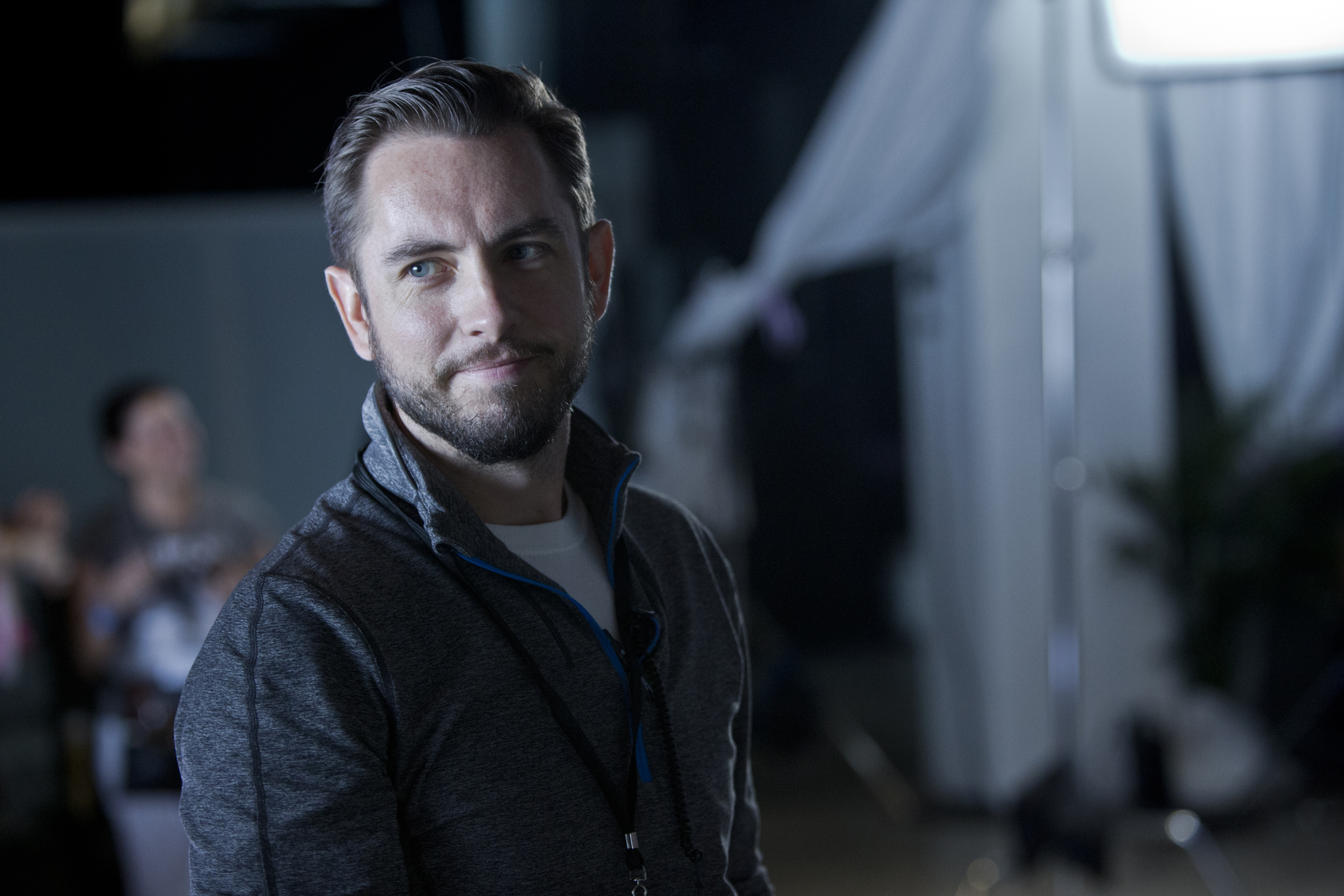
- Born: Joshua Alexander Caldwell; Seattle, Washington, U.S.
- Education: Fordham University
- Years active: 2001–present
- Children: 2

Joshua Alexander Caldwell is an American film director, screenwriter, and producer. In 2006, he won a Golden Popcorn award at the MTV Movie Awards for writing, directing and producing the film The Beautiful Lie.

== Biography ==
Beginning with screenwriting, Caldwell then moved into film production at Bellevue High School, where he created several different film projects. He attended Fordham University in New York City where he went on to write, produce and direct eight films, including The Beautiful Lie, starring Michaela McManus, which has been featured at several film festivals across the country. In June 2006, Caldwell was awarded an MTV Movie Award for the Best Film On Campus category for The Beautiful Lie. In 2007, he produced and directed The Ronnie Day Project for SonyBMG/Epic Records and mtvU.

In 2010, Caldwell co-wrote, directed and produced the short film Dig. Premiering at film festivals in 2011 and 2012, the film is the story of a young Holocaust survivor who, twenty years after his exodus from Europe, comes face to face with the Nazi responsible for his family's death. The film stars Mark Margolis and Aaron Himelstein.

Caldwell co-wrote, directed, produced and edited the cyber-bridges for the third book in Anthony E. Zuiker's digi-novel trilogy Level 26: Dark Revelations. The book was released nationwide on December 29, 2011, with the cyber-bridge (video components) being made available at Level26.com the same day.

In 2012, Caldwell began developing a feature film, on which he serves as a co-writer. He co-produced the online digital feature Cybergeddon from Anthony E. Zuiker and directed, produced, and co-wrote the Cybergeddon Zips, an eight-part series of short films that extend the characters and narrative from the feature experience.

Caldwell was a producer on the BlackBoxTV series Anthony E. Zuiker Presents, overseeing the production of short films for the YouTube Channel. Two of the films, The Reawakening, directed by Rob Legato, and Execution Style, directed by Lexi Alexander, have been released.

In 2013, Caldwell wrote and directed his debut feature film, Layover. Made for $6,000, the film was shot on a Canon EOS 5D and stars Nathalie Fay, Karl E. Landler, Bella Dayne and Hal Ozsan. The film is almost entirely French language although Caldwell does not speak French.

Caldwell directed the entire first season of the new Hulu show South Beach. Starring Jacqueline M Wood, Manny Montana, Jordi Vilasuso and Ana Vilafane the six-episode series, set in the affluent Miami neighborhood, follows the aftermath of a murder that appears to signal the return of a serial killer thought to have been killed two decades earlier. As the investigation proceeds, a complex web of crime, greed and betrayal ties together rival drug lords, bitter conflicts within the music industry, local politics and law enforcement.

In 2016, Caldwell directed his second feature Be Somebody starring Matthew Espinosa and Sarah Jeffrey.

In 2017, Caldwell's third feature film Negative was released. The film stars Katia Winter, Simon Quarterman and Sebastian Roche. Set in the American southwest the film follows Natalie, a former British spy who flees Los Angeles for Phoenix after a deal with a cartel goes wrong. She is joined by Hollis, a street photographer who has put his life at risk by taking Natalie's photo at the wrong time and in the wrong place. The film was released by MarVista Entertainment.

In 2019, Caldwell wrote and directed the heist thriller film Infamous starring Bella Thorne and Jake Manley. The film was released on June 12, 2020.

== Awards and honors ==
In 2001, American Tragedy was an honorable mention in the 2001 Seattle Times Short Film Festival.

Layover was an Official Selection of, and had its World Premiere at the 2014 Seattle International Film Festival. Caldwell and the film were nominated for the festival's New American Cinema Award. It was also an Official Selection of the 2014 Dances With Films Festival where it also screened in competition.

Mending the Line received the Valor Award at the San Diego International Film Festival.

== Filmography ==
Year	Film	Credit
2022	Mending the Line	Director, Producer
2020	Infamous	Director, Writer, Executive Producer
2017	Negative	Director, Producer, Director of Photography
2016	Be Somebody	Director, Executive Producer
2015	South Beach (Series)	Director
2014	Layover	Director, Writer, Producer
2014	Resignation (Short)	Director, Producer, Co-Writer
2011	Level 26: Dark Revelations	Director, Writer, Producer, Editor
2011	Dig (Short)	Director, Writer, Producer
2007	The Ronnie Day Project	Director, Writer, Producer
2006	The Beautiful Lie (Short)	Director, Writer, Producer
