= Welcome to Redville =

- Directed by: Isaac H. Eaton
- Written by: Isaac H. Eaton; Danny DeVoto
- Produced by: Isaac H. Eaton; Frank Zanca
- Starring: Chris Elliott; Jake Manley; Highdee Kuan
- Distributed by: Gravitas Ventures
- Release date: August 29, 2023
- Running time: 88 minutes
- Country: United States
- Language: English

Welcome to Redville is a 2023 American drama film written by Isaac H. Eaton and Daniel Devoto, directed by Eaton and starring Chris Elliott, Jake Manley and Highdee Kuan.

== Cast ==
- Chris Elliott as Sheriff Brooks
- Jake Manley as Leo
- Highdee Kuan as Toni
- Sabrina Haskett as Lila
- Mitch Field as Jason
- Ashley Doris as Vicky
- Warren Sweeney as Valentino
- Phil Hendrie as Swanson
- Dusty Sorg as Riley the Drunkard

== Release ==
In July 2023, it was announced that the global rights to the film were acquired by Gravitas Ventures. The film was released on VOD on August 29, 2023.

== Reception ==
Michael Talbot-Haynes of Film Threat rated the film a 6.5 out of 10.
