= Lisa Eilbacher =

American actress (born 1956)

- Born: Lisa Marie Eilbacher; May 5, 1956 (age 70); Dhahran, Saudi Arabia
- Occupation: Actress
- Years active: 1969–1995
- Known for: An Officer and a Gentleman; Beverly Hills Cop; The Hardy Boys/Nancy Drew Mysteries; Spider-Man; 10 to Midnight; Midnight Caller
- Spouse: Bradford May (1988– )
- Relatives: Cindy Eilbacher; Bobby Eilbacher

Lisa Marie Eilbacher (born May 5, 1956) is an American former actress. She is best known for her role as Jenny Summers in Beverly Hills Cop (1984).

== Early life ==
Lisa Marie Eilbacher was born on May 5, 1956, to American parents, Beverly and Robert Charles Eilbacher, in Dhahran, Saudi Arabia. Robert was an executive at Aramco, headquartered in Dhahran. She is the second of five children, two others of whom also worked as child actors. Eilbacher and her family divided their time between Saudi Arabia, France, Germany, and Switzerland until 1963, when her father relocated the family to Beverly Hills and became a realtor. (Note: Two decades later, in a UPI profile of his by-then well established actress daughter, he was referred to as "a Beverly Hills oil and real estate tycoon".) Eilbacher attended Beverly Hills Catholic School and Beverly Hills High. She never formally studied acting, but was coached in it by her mother. In a 1987 interview, Eilbacher described the coaching she received:

I really believe that no one can teach anyone to 'act.' You can only be taught to open up, and that she did for me.

Eilbacher is the older sister of former actress Cindy Eilbacher, with whom she appeared in the 1974 television movie Bad Ronald, and of former child actor, Bobby Eilbacher.

== Career ==
=== Child actress and tv roles ===
Eilbacher started acting as a child, appearing on such shows as My Three Sons and Gunsmoke. She later made a transition into adult roles on such shows as The Amazing Spider-Man.

Eilbacher starred as Callie Shaw in The Hardy Boys Mysteries in 1977. The same year, she appeared in the episode "The Innocent" of the short-lived Logan's Run TV series. Eilbacher also guest starred on the TV series Man from Atlantis in an episode where she played Shakespeare's Juliet. She appeared alongside her sister Cynthia "Cindy" Eilbacher at least twice, most famously in the 1974 made-for-television horror film Bad Ronald, in which they portray two of the three teenage daughters of the family newly residing in the old Wilby house. Prior to that, they had appeared as sisters Bridget and Beth Jordan, onscreen daughters of guest star Vera Miles in the 1971 Alias Smith and Jones episode, "The Posse That Wouldn't Quit".

=== Subsequent roles and films ===
In 1981, Eilbacher starred in the television film This House Possessed with Parker Stevenson, with whom she worked on The Hardy Boys Mysteries. That same year, she acted in Lee Philips's film On the Right Track starring television star Gary Coleman. Some reviews concluded that it was sappy and capitalizing on Coleman's TV following, many found the film charming, well written, and well acted. Kevin Thomas of the Los Angeles Times, felt she stood out by saying it "is Coleman's picture, but its unexpected pleasure is Eilbacher".

Eilbacher is best known for her roles in two 1980s films: An Officer and a Gentleman and Beverly Hills Cop. In An Officer and a Gentleman, she played Naval Aviation Officer Candidate Casey Seeger, a popular and charming woman who nearly flunked out of the program due to her inability to complete the obstacle course, but she persevered and graduated. An amateur bodybuilder in real life, Eilbacher said that the hardest aspect of this role was "pretending" to be out of shape. In Beverly Hills Cop, she played Jenny Summers, a childhood friend of Eddie Murphy's character who reunited with him to solve the murder of a mutual friend.

Eilbacher was also featured in the 1983 miniseries The Winds of War, playing Madeleine Henry. In 1985, she co-starred with Holland Taylor in the ABC detective series Me and Mom.

== Personal life ==
Eilbacher has been married to director and photographer Bradford May since 1988.

== Filmography ==
=== Film ===
Year	Title	Role	Notes
1972	The War Between Men and Women	Caroline Kozlenko	
1977	Run for the Roses	Carol	
1981	On the Right Track	Jill Klein	
1982	An Officer and a Gentleman	Casey Seeger	
1983	10 to Midnight	Laurie Kessler	
1984	Beverly Hills Cop	Jeannette 'Jenny' Summers	
1988	Deadly Intent	Laura Keaton	Video
1988	Never Say Die	Melissa Jones	
1989	Leviathan	Bridget Bowman	
1990	The Last Samurai	Susan	
1992	Live Wire	Terry O'Neill	

=== Television ===
Year	Title	Role	Notes
1969	My Three Sons	Bunny	Episode: "Teacher's Pet"
1971	Alias Smith and Jones	Bridget Jordan	Episode: "The Posse That Wouldn't Quit"
1972	Bonanza	Eloise	Episode: "First Love"
1973	The Waltons	Lois-May	Episode: "The Fire"
1973	The Brady Bunch	Vicki	Episode: "The Subject Was Noses"
1973	Owen Marshall: Counselor at Law	Jeannie Holden	Episode: "The Pool House"
1973	Gunsmoke	Melody	Episode: "Kimbro"
1974	The Texas Wheelers	Sally	Episode: "Wailin' Wheeler Is Dead"
1974	Apple's Way	Gloria	Episode: "The First Love"
1974	Bad Ronald	Ellen Wood	TV film
1974	Shazam!	Cathy Moore	Episode: "The Doom Buggy"
1975	Movin' On	Cathy	Episode: "Landslide"
1975	Gunsmoke	Lailee	Episode: "The Sharecroppers"
1975	Caribe	Cindee	Episode: "The Patriots"
1976	Panache	Lisa	TV film
1976	The Streets of San Francisco	Gail Dobbs	Episode: "Dead or Alive"
1977	The Hardy Boys/Nancy Drew Mysteries	Callie Shaw	Recurring role (7 episodes)
1977	The Amazing Spider-Man	Judy Tyler	Episode: "Pilot"
1977	Logan's Run	Lisa	Episode: "The Innocent"
1977	Man from Atlantis	Juliet	Episode: "The Naked Montague"
1978	Hawaii Five-O	Elaine Sebastian	Episode: "Tall on the Wave"
1978	Wheels	Jody Horton	TV miniseries
1979	The Ordeal of Patty Hearst	Patty Hearst	TV film
1979	Love for Rent	Lynn Martin	TV film
1980	To Race the Wind	Kit	TV film
1981	This House Possessed	Sheila Moore	TV film
1982	Simon & Simon	Stacey Wheeler / Maggie & Sharon Dameron	Episodes: "Earth to Stacey", "Sometimes Dreams Come True"
1983	The Winds of War	Madeline Henry	TV miniseries
1983	55th Academy Awards	Self - Presenter	
1983	Ryan's Four	Dr. Ingrid Sorenson	Episode; "Ryan's Four"
1983	Battle of the Network Stars XIV	Self - ABC Team	
1985	Me and Mom	Kate Morgan	Main role (6 episodes)
1986	The Twilight Zone	Andie Fields	Episode: "Nightsong"
1986	Monte Carlo	Maggie Egan	TV film
1987	Deadly Deception	Anne	TV film
1989	Manhunt: Search for the Night Stalker	Anne Clark	TV film
1990	Joshua's Heart	Kit	TV film
1990–1991	Midnight Caller	Nicky Molloy	Regular role (19 episodes)
1992	Blind Man's Bluff	Carolyn	TV film
1992	Deadly Matrimony	Nina Sloane	TV film
1995	The Return of Hunter	Sally Vogel	TV film
1995	Dazzle	Fernanda Kulkullen	TV film
1995	919 Fifth Avenue	Janet Van Degen	TV film
