= Holland Taylor =

American actress (born 1943)

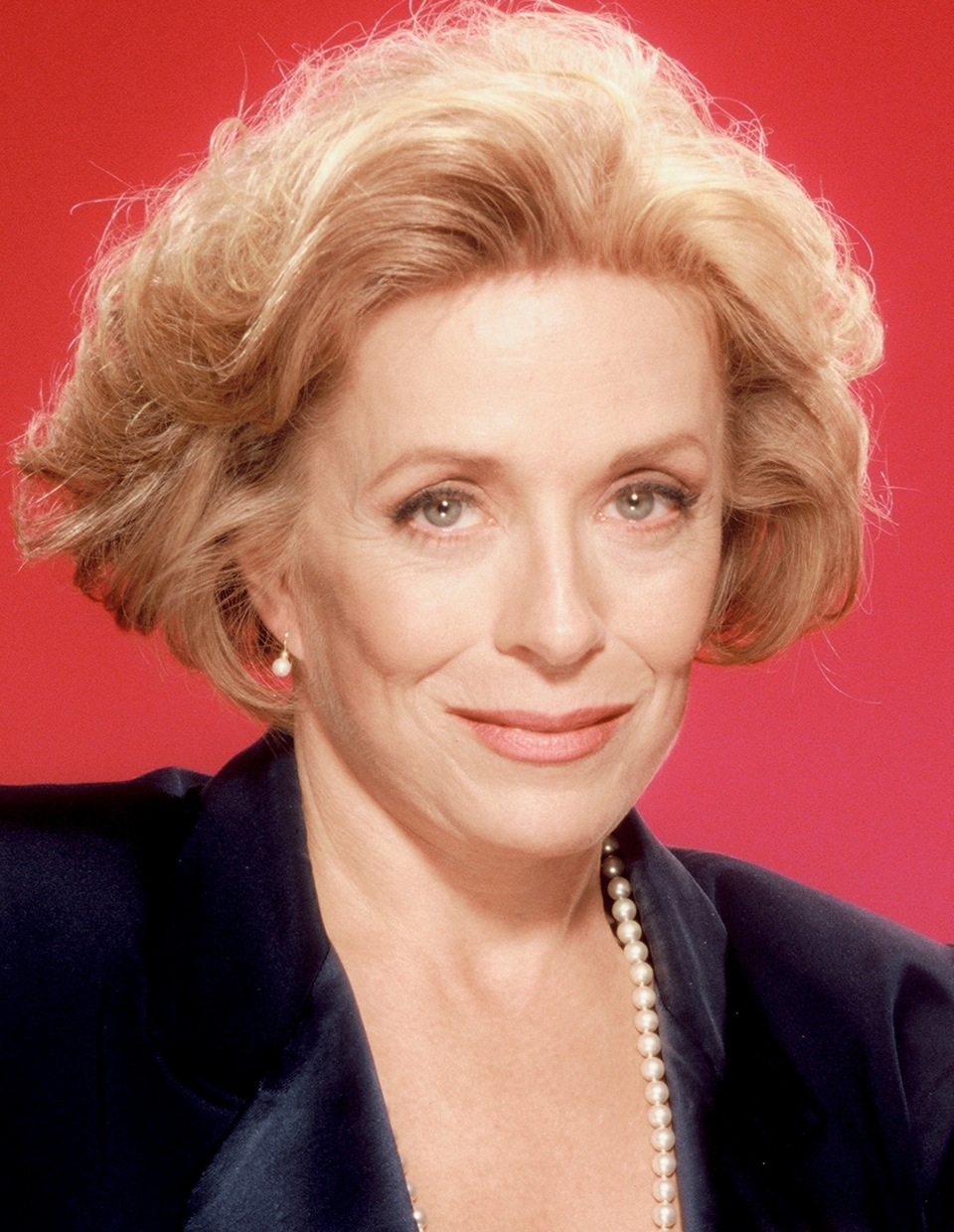
- Taylor in 1994
- Born: January 14, 1943 (age 83); Philadelphia, Pennsylvania, U.S.
- Occupation: Actress
- Years active: 1965–present
- Partner: Sarah Paulson (2015–present)
- Relatives: Brad Anderson (nephew)

Holland Taylor (born January 14, 1943) is an American actress. She won the 1999 Primetime Emmy Award for Outstanding Supporting Actress in a Drama Series for her role as Judge Roberta Kittleson on ABC's The Practice (1998–2003) and she received four Primetime Emmy Award nominations for her role as Evelyn Harper on Two and a Half Men (2003–15).

Taylor's other notable television credits include starring roles on the sitcoms Bosom Buddies (1980–82), The Powers That Be (1992–93) and The Naked Truth (1995–98). She also appeared as Jill Ollinger on the soap opera All My Children (1981–83), as Peggy Peabody on The L Word (2004–08), and as Ida Silver on Mr. Mercedes (2017–19). In 2017 she played Alice Lewis, Letty's jewel thief grandmother, in the TNT series Good Behavior.

In 2020, she received critical praise and her eighth Primetime Emmy Award nomination for portraying Ellen Kincaid in the Netflix miniseries Hollywood.

Taylor's feature film credits include Romancing the Stone (1984) and its sequel The Jewel of the Nile (1985), Alice (1990), To Die For (1995), One Fine Day (1996), George of the Jungle (1997), The Truman Show (1998), Happy Accidents (2000), Keeping the Faith (2000), Legally Blonde (2001), The Wedding Date (2005), Baby Mama (2008), Gloria Bell (2018), Bill & Ted Face the Music (2020), and The Stand In (2020).

Taylor wrote and starred in the one-woman play, Ann (Broadway, 2013), based on the life and work of Ann Richards. For this she received a nomination for the Tony Award for Best Actress. She returned to the role in the 2022 West Coast premiere at the Pasadena Playhouse. Her other notable Broadway credits include Butley (1972), We Interrupt This Program... (1975), Moose Murders (1983), and The Front Page (2016).

== Early life ==
Taylor was born in Philadelphia on January 14, 1943, to Virginia (née Davis), a painter, and C. Tracy Taylor, an attorney. She attended high school at Westtown School, a Quaker boarding school in West Chester, Pennsylvania, graduating in 1960. She majored in Theatre at Bennington College, graduating in 1964, before moving to New York City to become an actress.

== Career ==
Taylor began in the theater. Throughout the 1960s, '70s, and '80s, she appeared in numerous Broadway and off-Broadway productions, including starring roles in Simon Gray's Butley and A. R. Gurney's The Cocktail Hour; for the latter, she was nominated for a Drama Desk award. In 1983, Taylor appeared in Breakfast with Les and Bess, which prompted the New York magazine theatre critic John Simon to sing, "...Miss Taylor is one of the few utterly graceful, attractive, elegant and technically accomplished actresses in our theatre...seeing her may turn you, like me, into a Taylor freak..."

Taylor took the role of Denise Cavanaugh, who killed herself just to frame her husband, on the soap opera The Edge of Night. Then, encouraged by her acting coach, Stella Adler, Taylor took a role that would make her well known: Tom Hanks' sexy, demanding boss in the 1980s sitcom Bosom Buddies.

She proved herself to be equally adept at both comedy and drama. In 1985, she co-starred with Lisa Eilbacher in the ABC detective series Me and Mom. Two years later, she played opposite Alan Arkin in the short-lived ABC sitcom Harry, in which she received "starring" billing. In 1990, Taylor reunited with former Bosom Buddies executive producers Thomas L. Miller and Robert L. Boyett for a role on their ABC sitcom Going Places, playing grand dame television producer Dawn St. Claire for the show's first 13 episodes. From 1992 to 1993, she starred in Norman Lear's The Powers That Be with John Forsythe and David Hyde Pierce, playing the wife of Forsythe's character, a U.S. senator.

In early 1994, she joined the cast of Saved by the Bell: The College Years as Dean Susan McMann, just episodes before its cancellation. Following this was her role as high-powered newspaper editor Camilla Dane on the ABC/NBC sitcom The Naked Truth; Taylor was one of the few cast members to last through the show's entire run through 1998, despite several retoolings.

She played the part of Judge Roberta Kittleson on The Practice. Originally intended to be a one-time appearance, the role lasted from 1998 to 2003. She won the Primetime Emmy Award for Outstanding Supporting Actress in a Drama Series in 1999; in her acceptance speech, she is remembered for claiming the statue and exclaiming, "Overnight!" Taylor thanked David E. Kelley, The Practice's producer/writer and creator, for "giving me a chariot to ride up here on: A woman who puts a flag on the moon for women over 40—who can think, who can work, who are successes, who can cook, and who can COOK!" She was nominated in the same category for the same role the following year.

Taylor was also nominated for the Primetime Emmy Award for Outstanding Guest Actress in a Comedy Series for her recurring role on AMC's The Lot, and has been nominated for Emmys five times since 2003: four for Outstanding Supporting Actress in a Comedy Series for her role on the TV series Two and a Half Men, playing Evelyn Harper, the snobbish, overbearing mother of Charlie Sheen and Jon Cryer's characters, and one for Outstanding Supporting Actress in a Limited Series or Movie for her role as Ellen Kincaid, a studio executive and mentor for aspiring actors, in the miniseries Hollywood. Taylor's television movie and series guest roles have been extensive and include appearances on ER and Veronica's Closet, and recurring roles on Ally McBeal and Monk, and as billionaire Peggy Peabody on The L Word.

Taylor's movie roles have included Reese Witherspoon's character's tough Harvard law professor in the 2001 comedy Legally Blonde, Tina Fey's character's mother in Baby Mama, The Truman Show, Happy Accidents, Next Stop Wonderland, George of the Jungle, The Wedding Date, How to Make an American Quilt, Romancing the Stone, D.E.B.S., Cop and a Half, and One Fine Day.

Taylor's animated roles include that of Prudence, the castle's majordomo and love interest of the Grand Duke, in Disney's Cinderella II and Cinderella III: A Twist in Time. She also played a role in the animated show American Dad! as Francine's biological mother.

Taylor began researching, writing, and producing a one-woman play about the late Texas Governor Ann Richards in 2009. The two-act play, originally titled Money, Marbles, and Chalk, starring Taylor as Richards, was first workshopped in May 2010 at The Grand 1894 Opera House in Galveston, Texas. It was later retitled Ann: An Affectionate Portrait of Ann Richards and opened in Chicago November 16, 2011, where it was billed as a "pre-Broadway" engagement. It played at the Kennedy Center in Washington, D.C., from December 17, 2011, through January 15, 2012. The show next opened on Broadway at the Vivian Beaumont Theatre on March 7, 2013. For this role, Taylor was nominated for the Tony Award for Best Lead Actress in a Play. PBS Great Performances broadcast the premiere of the play, now titled simply Ann, on June 19, 2020. It had been recorded at the Zach Theater in Austin, Texas, following its national tour and Broadway run.

== Personal life ==
On November 30, 2015, while answering a question about marriage, in a radio interview with WNYC, Taylor said that she was in a relationship with a younger woman and that most of her relationships have been with women. Her partner was later reported to be actress Sarah Paulson. In March 2016, Paulson confirmed the relationship when she stated during an interview that they had been dating since early 2015, after the two had met at a dinner party approximately in 2006. In August 2020, Taylor told the LGBTQ&A podcast that she is gay.

Taylor has been a supporter of Aid for AIDS in Los Angeles, serving on their Honorary Board and as an ongoing participant in their largest annual fundraiser, Best in Drag Show, among other fundraising efforts.

== Filmography ==
=== Film ===
Year	Title	Role	Notes
1976	The Next Man	TV Interviewer	
1979	3 by Cheever: O Youth and Beauty!	Beverly	
1980	Fame	Claudia Van Doren	Uncredited
1983	Reuben, Reuben		Uncredited
1984	Concealed Enemies	Mrs. Marbury	
1984	Romancing the Stone	Gloria Horne	
1985	Key Exchange	Mrs. Fanshaw	
1985	The Jewel of the Nile	Gloria Horne	
1987	Tales from the Hollywood Hills: Natica Jackson	Ernestine King	
1988	She's Having a Baby	Sarah Briggs	
1990	Alice	Helen	
1993	Cop and a Half	Captain Rubio	
1994	The Favor	Maggie Sand	
1995	To Die For	Carol Stone	
1995	How to Make an American Quilt	Mrs. Rubens	
1995	Last Summer in the Hamptons	Davis Mora Axelrod	
1995	Steal Big Steal Little	Mona Rowland-Downey	
1996	One Fine Day	Rita	
1997	George of the Jungle	Beatrice Stanhope	
1997	Just Write	Emma Jeffreys	
1997	Betty	Crystal Ball	
1998	The Unknown Cyclist	Celia	Uncredited
1998	The Truman Show	Alanis Montclair/Angela Burbank	
1998	Next Stop Wonderland	Piper Castleton	
1999	The Sex Monster	Muriel	
2000	Happy Accidents	Maggie Ann "Meg" Ford	
2000	Mail to the Chief	Katherine Horner	
2000	Keeping the Faith	Bonnie Rose	
2001	Town & Country	Mistress of Ceremonies	
2001	Legally Blonde	Professor Elspeth Stromwell	
2002	Fits and Starts		
2002	Cinderella II: Dreams Come True	Prudence	Voice role
2002	Home Room	Dr. Hollander	
2002	Spy Kids 2: The Island of Lost Dreams	Grandma Helga Avellan	
2003	Spy Kids 3-D: Game Over	Grandma Helga Avellan	Cameo
2003	Intent	Judge Cavallo	
2004	D.E.B.S.	Mrs. Petrie	
2005	The Wedding Date	Bunny Ellis	
2007	Cinderella III: A Twist in Time	Prudence	Voice role
2008	Baby Mama	Rose Holbrook	
2010	The Chosen One	Ruth	
2017	Kepler's Dream	Violet von Stern	
2018	Gloria Bell	Hillary Bell	
2019	Bombshell	Faye	Uncredited
2020	To All the Boys: P.S. I Still Love You	Edith "Stormy" McClaren-Sheehan	
2020	Bill & Ted Face the Music	The Great Leader	
2020	The Stand In	Barbara Cox	
2023	Quiz Lady	Francine	
2025	Fantasy Life	Dr. Greene	

=== Television ===
Year	Title	Role	Notes
1969	J.T.	Mrs. Arnold	Television film
1971	Love Is a Many Splendored Thing	Trish Wanamaker	
1973	Somerset	Sgt. Ruth Winter	
1975	Beacon Hill	Marilyn Gardiner	
1977	Kojak	Elizabeth	1 episode
1977–1980	The Edge of Night	Denise Norwood Cavanaugh, R.N.	
1980–1981	Bosom Buddies	Ruth Dunbar	21 episodes
1981	ABC Afterschool Special	Francine Martin	Episode: "My Mother Was Never a Kid"
1981–1983	All My Children	Jill Ollinger	
1982	The Royal Romance of Charles and Diana	Frances Shand Kydd	Television film
1982	I Was a Mail Order Bride	Dottie Birmington	Television film
1983	The Love Boat	Kathy Brighton	1 episode
1984	Kate & Allie	Linda Cabot	1 episode
1985	Me and Mom	Zena Hunnicutt	
1985	Perry Mason Returns	Paula Gordon	Television film
1987	Harry	Ina Duckett, R.N.	7 episodes
1987	Perfect Strangers	Olivia Crawford	1 episode
1987–1989	CBS Summer Playhouse	Fran Grogan	2 episodes
1989	Murder, She Wrote	Winifred Thayer	1 episode
1990	Wiseguy	Allison Royce	1 episode
1990	People Like Us	Dolly	Television film
1990	Big Deals	Mrs. Bluett	Television film
1990–1991	Going Places	Dawn St. Clare	3 episodes
1991	The Rape of Doctor Willis	Dr. Greenway	Television film
1992–1993	The Powers That Be	Margaret Powers	20 episodes
1993	With Hostile Intent	Lois Baxter	Television film
1993–1994	Saved by the Bell: The College Years	Dean Susan McMann	7 episodes
1994	Betrayal of Trust	Mary Shelton	Television film
1994	In the Best of Families: Marriage, Pride & Madness	Florence Newsom	Television film
1994	The Counterfeit Contessa	Wallace Everett	Television film
1994–1995	Diagnosis: Murder	Agent Gretchen McCord	2 episodes
1995	A Walton Wedding	Aunt Flo	Television film
1995	Awake to Danger	Dr. Joyce Lindley	Television film
1995–1998	The Naked Truth	Camilla Dane	23 episodes
1996	Something So Right	Abigail	1 episode
1998–2003	The Practice	Judge Roberta Kittleson	29 episodes
1998	Veronica's Closet	Millicent	2 episodes
1998	Buddy Faro	Olivia Vandermeer	1 episode
1999	ER	Phyllis Farr	1 episode
1999	The Lot	Letitia DeVine	
1999	My Last Love	Marnie Morton	Television film
1999–2000	Ally McBeal	2nd Woman in Face Bra Infomercial / Judge Roberta Kittleson	2 episodes
2000	Strong Medicine	Lillian Pynchon	1 episode
2000	DAG	Katherine Twigg	1 episode
2000	The Living Edens	Narrator	1 episode
2000	The Spiral Staircase	Emma Warren	Television film
2000	The Deadly Look of Love	Evelyn McGinnis	Television film
2001	Strange Frequency	Marge Crowley	Television film; segment: "Room Service"
2001	The Fighting Fitzgeralds	Rose	1 episode
2001	The Day Reagan Was Shot	Nancy Reagan	Television film
2002	Fillmore!	Mrs. Cornwall (voice)	1 episode
2003–2015	Two and a Half Men	Evelyn Harper	101 episodes
2004–2008	The L Word	Peggy Peabody	8 episodes
2005–2007	Monk	Peggy Davenport	2 episodes
2007	American Dad!	Cassandra Dawson (voice)	Episode: "Big Trouble in Little Langley"
2012	Electric City	Ruth Orwell (voice)	20 episodes
2012	McDonald's Thanksgiving Parade	Grand Marshal	Television special
2017–2019	Mr. Mercedes	Ida Silver	29 episodes
2017	The Orville	Jeannie Mercer	Episode: "Command Performance"
2017	Speechless	Andrea	Episode: "B-R-I-- BRITISH I-N-V-- INVASION"
2017	Good Behavior	Alice	2 episodes
2019	Spirit Riding Free	Madame Gummery (voice)	Episode: "Lucky and the New Frontier: Part 1"
2019	Dollface	Guest speaker	Episode: "Feminist"
2019	Better Things	Herself	Episode: "The Unknown"
2020	Hollywood	Ellen Kincaid	7 episodes
2021	The Chair	Professor Joan Hambling	6 episodes
2021–present	The Morning Show	Cybil Richards	10 episodes
2022	The Great North	Goldie (voice)	Episode: "As Goldie as It Gets Adventure"
2023	Billions	Dr. Eleanor Mayer	3 episodes
2026	Brothers	Ma Mac	Main role

=== Theater ===
Broadway

Year	Title	Role	Venue
1965–66	The Devils	Ensemble	Broadway Theatre, Broadway
1972–73	Butley	Anne Butley	Morosco Theatre, Broadway
1975	We Interrupt This Program...	Amanda Williams	Ambassador Theatre, Broadway
1975–76	Murder Among Friends	Angela Forrester	Biltmore Theatre, Broadway
1977	Something Old, Something New	Cynthia Morse	Morosco Theatre, Broadway
1983	Moose Murders	Hedda Holloway	Eugene O'Neill Theatre, Broadway
2013	Ann	Ann Richards	Vivian Beaumont Theatre, Broadway
2016	The Front Page	Mrs. Grant	John Golden Theatre, Broadway

Off-Broadway

Year	Title	Role	Venue
1967	The Poker Session	Irene	Martinique Theatre, Off-Broadway
1968	The David Show	Performer	Players Theatre, New York City
1969	Tonight in Living Color	Performer	Actors Playhouse, New York City
1970	Colette	Performer	Ellen Stewart Theatre, New York City
1974	Fashion	Kim Howard	McAlpin Rooftop Theatre, New York City
1976	Children	Barbara	Manhattan Theatre Club, New York City
1979	Drinks Before Dinner	Performer	
1982–83	Breakfast with Les and Bess	Bess	Hudson Guild Theatre, New York City
1986	The Perfect Party	Performer	Playwrights Horizons
1988–89	The Cocktail Hour	Sister	Promenade Theatre, New York City
1989	Love Letters	Melissa Gardner	Promenade Theatre, New York City
1999	The Vagina Monologues	Performer	West Side Theater
2011	Ann: An Affectionate Portrait of Ann Richards	Ann Richards	
2015	Ripcord	Abby	
2024	N/A	N	Mitzi E. Newhouse Theater, New York City

== Awards and nominations ==
Organizations	Year	Category	Nominated work	Result	Ref.
Primetime Emmy Awards	1999	Outstanding Supporting Actress in a Drama Series	The Practice	Won	
Primetime Emmy Awards	2000	Outstanding Supporting Actress in a Drama Series	The Practice	Nominated	
Primetime Emmy Awards	2000	Outstanding Guest Actress in a Comedy Series	The Lot	Nominated	
Primetime Emmy Awards	2005	Outstanding Supporting Actress in a Comedy Series	Two and a Half Men	Nominated	
Primetime Emmy Awards	2007	Outstanding Supporting Actress in a Comedy Series	Two and a Half Men	Nominated	
Primetime Emmy Awards	2008	Outstanding Supporting Actress in a Comedy Series	Two and a Half Men	Nominated	
Primetime Emmy Awards	2010	Outstanding Supporting Actress in a Comedy Series	Two and a Half Men	Nominated	
Primetime Emmy Awards	2020	Outstanding Supporting Actress in a Limited Series or Movie	Hollywood	Nominated	
Primetime Emmy Awards	2024	Outstanding Supporting Actress in a Drama Series	The Morning Show	Nominated	
Tony Awards	2013	Best Actress in a Play	Ann	Nominated	
