= Best in Drag Show =

Best In Drag Show
- Status: Active
- Genre: Fundraising event
- Frequency: Annually
- Venue: Orpheum Theatre
- Location: Los Angeles
- Country: USA
- Years active: 1989-
- Inaugurated: 1989
- Founder: Alexis Pittman
- Major events: Drag show
- People: Kathy Griffin, Melanie Griffith, Vanessa Williams

Best In Drag Show is an annual fundraising event in Los Angeles, California, originally benefiting the California-based non-profit, Aid For AIDS, a program of Alliance for Housing and Healing. Initiated six years after Aid For AIDS was founded in 1983, the bawdy fundraiser now supports Alliance for Housing and Healing, the non-profit that resulted from the merger of Aid For AIDS and The Serra Project in 2009.

== History ==
The AIDS fundraiser, an elaborate drag show "beauty" pageant that features amateur performers as beauty contestants, evolved from a small event in a private apartment in 1989 to successively larger theaters to hold the growing audiences. In the 1990s, the Wilshire Ebell Theatre was used, followed by the historic Orpheum Theatre in downtown Los Angeles, which seats 1,800. A small group of friends in West Hollywood created the original show, Battle for the Tiara, a farcical beauty pageant aimed at raising funds for AIDS assistance through Aid For AIDS that was featured in a documentary in 1998, Battle For the Tiara. The original Aid For AIDS fundraiser ran for 11 years. Following the death of its founder, Alexis Pittman, the original group took two years off. During the interim years, a version of the fundraiser named Quest for the Crown was produced by non-profit Aid For AIDS, the beneficiary. The original group returned to helm the show for executive producer Aid For AIDS in 2003 with the currently-named production, Best In Drag Show. By 2009, more than $1.5 million had been raised with the new version of the show to help support the work of Aid For AIDS in Southern California. Both Best In Drag Show and Quest for the Crown are registered trademarks of Aid For AIDS.

== Supporters ==
Numerous and notable celebrities have supported the show over the years, volunteering as pageant judges and donating money. Many return year after year. Best In Drag Show celebrity supporters (and from the prior two versions of the fundraiser) have included Jason Alexander, Loni Anderson, Garcelle Beauvais, Rachel Bilson, Sarah Chalke, Melinda Clarke, Kim Coles, Jennifer Coolidge, Marcia Cross, Jon Cryer, Eric Dane, Jeffrey Drew, Anna Faris, Peter Gallagher, Rebecca Gayheart, Sara Gilbert, Kathy Griffin, Melanie Griffith, Linda Hamilton, Perez Hilton, Dot-Marie Jones, Chris Kattan, Kathy Kinney, Lori Loughlin, Jane Lynch, Camryn Manheim, Jayma Mays, Maria Menounos, Niecy Nash, Mary-Louise Parker, Chris Pratt, John C. Reilly, Debbie Reynolds, Caroline Rhea, Kelly Rowan, Katey Sagal, Molly Shannon, Charlie Sheen, Martin Sheen, Tori Spelling, Nicole Sullivan, Holland Taylor (Aid For AIDS Honorary Board Member), Jennifer Tilly, Judy Tenuta, James Van Der Beek, Dita Von Teese, Lisa Ann Walter, and Jo Anne Worley. Aid For AIDS major supporters Charlie Sheen and Kathy Griffin (Griffin began opening the fundraiser as hostess in 2003) were honored with AFA Silver Anniversary Angel Awards at the nonprofit's 25th anniversary in 2009. Award-winning casting director Patrick Rush, who served as the fundraiser's Master of Ceremonies for 18 years, is an ongoing producer of Best In Drag Show and was a member of the volunteer team producing Battle For the Tiara since its first year. Aid For AIDS recognized his long-standing support in 2009 by establishing a scholarship, the Patrick R. Service Award, in his honor. Rush, an Aid For AIDS nominee, was honored by The City of West Hollywood with the Paul Andrew Starke Warrior Award in 2005, presented on World AIDS Day to outstanding members of the community working in HIV/AIDS services. Other Best In Drag Show supporters nominated by Aid For AIDS who received this award are Tom Pardoe (in 2007), producer, director and choreographer 2003-2010, and Jeffrey Drew (in 2008), long-time show collaborator and star performer. Drew became director and choreographer in 2011.

== Awards ==
The Best In Drag Show volunteers were honored in 2010 by Christopher Street West (CSW) with the CSW Special Community Award. CSW annually produces the Los Angeles LGBT Pride Festival and Parade (LA Pride).
