= The Brothers Sun =

American dark action-comedy television series

- Promotional poster
- Genre: Action; Comedy drama
- Created by: Byron Wu & Brad Falchuk
- Starring: Michelle Yeoh; Justin Chien; Sam Song Li; Joon Lee; Highdee Kuan
- Music by: Nathan Matthew David; Nick Lee
- Country of origin: United States
- Original languages: English; Mandarin; Korean
- No. of seasons: 1
- No. of episodes: 8

Production
- Executive producers: Brad Falchuk; Byron Wu; Kevin Tancharoen; Mikkel Bondesen
- Producers: John H. Radulovic; Kim M. Cybulski
- Production locations: Los Angeles, California; Taipei City, Taiwan
- Cinematography: C. Kim Miles; Andrew Mitchell
- Editors: Mark Strand; Ryan Chan; Evita Yuepu Zhou
- Running time: 47–69 minutes
- Production company: Brad Falchuk Teley-Vision

Original release
- Network: Netflix
- Release: January 4, 2024

The Brothers Sun is an American action comedy drama television series created by Brad Falchuk and Byron Wu for Netflix. It premiered on January 4, 2024. In March 2024, the series was canceled after one season.

== Premise ==
The life of average Californian Bruce Sun is turned upside down when his older brother, Charles Sun, arrives in Los Angeles, California, from Taipei, Taiwan. After an attempted assassination of his father, Charles flies to LA to keep his family safe. Having little recollection of his childhood in Taipei, Bruce slowly learns about his family's profession as Taipei's most renowned gangsters, with his brother being a hardened criminal raised by his crime boss father. Additionally, Bruce finds out his mother moved with him to California because she possessed information that required her to stay hidden. His mother's effort at keeping Bruce out of the gangster life is strongly tested as Bruce becomes more involved in the events that beset the family in Los Angeles.

== Cast and characters ==
=== Main ===
- Michelle Yeoh as Eileen "Mama" Sun
- Justin Chien as Charles Sun, Eileen's eldest son
- Sam Song Li as Bruce Sun, Eileen's younger son
- Joon Lee as Terrence "TK" Kang, Bruce's Korean-American best friend who is a drug dealer and stoner
- Highdee Kuan as Alexis Kong, a deputy district attorney in Los Angeles and Charles' childhood friend from Taipei

=== Recurring ===
- Alice Hewkin as twin sisters June and May Song
- Jenny Yang as Xing
- Johnny Kou as Big Sun
- Jon Xue Zhang as Blood Boots
- Zhan Wang as Yuan
- Madison Hu as Grace
- Rodney To as Detective Mark Rizal
- Ron Yuan as Frank Ma

== Production ==
=== Development ===
On February 2, 2022, Netflix ordered the production of The Brothers Sun created by Brad Falchuk and Byron Wu, as part of Falchuk's eight-figure deal with Netflix, with both creators serving as executive producers and Falchuk as the showrunner. Alongside Wu and Falchuk, Mikkel Bondesen and Kevin Tancharoen would join as the executive producers. The series would consist of 8 episodes with Wu set to write the story and Tancharoen set to direct the series. On March 1, 2024, Netflix canceled the series after one season.

=== Casting ===
On June 13, 2022, the cast was revealed as Michelle Yeoh and Justin Chien took the leading roles as Eileen Sun and Charles Sun respectively. Joining the main cast would be Sam Song Li as Bruce Sun, Highdee Kuan as Alexis and Joon Lee as TK. Other cast members who took recurring roles are Alice Hewkin, Jon Xue Zhang, Madison Hu, Rodney Tu, Jenny Yang, and Johnny Kou.

=== Filming ===
Filming took place in Los Angeles, California and Taipei City, Taiwan for three months. The house in episode six was filmed at Villa Splendido in Malibu, which was used as a fictional mansion in the show. The team reached out to John Cho's representative for permission to create a polar opposite character under his name. Sam Song Li said, "I think John Cho is a lot more humble than he's portrayed." Cho's band, Viva La Union, had their song "Alive" featured in the same episode.

== Episodes ==
No.	Title	Directed by	Written by	Original release date
1	"Pilot"	Kevin Tancharoen	Byron Wu & Brad Falchuk	January 4, 2024
Jade Dragon assassin Charles Sun is attacked in his Taipei apartment by unknown assailants, who also shoot his father, the Jade Dragon leader known as Big Sun, putting him into a coma. Believing it to be the work of their rival Sleepy Chan, Charles heads to Los Angeles to find and protect his estranged mother Eileen and his younger brother Bruce. Unable to pay his medical school tuition after spending it on improv classes, Bruce is convinced by his friend TK to sell drugs at a nightclub. Charles arrives at his mother's home and kills an assassin, the Giant, before reuniting with his mother. Charles heads to the same nightclub Bruce is at to meet May, a local crime boss and potential ally. He finds Bruce and attempts to leave with him but May confronts the two brothers. After fighting her, Charles and Bruce escape an armed raid by a group of unknown men who kill May.
2	"Favor for a Favor"	Kevin Tancharoen	Byron Wu	January 4, 2024
Eileen cuts up the Giant's body and orders her sons to dispose of it. Afterwards, Charles visits a local triad leader to identify the Giant but they are attacked by the unknown men, who kill the triad leader. After escaping, Charles takes Bruce to school where Charles is reunited with Alexis, an old childhood friend who is now a deputy district attorney investigating the triads. Bruce befriends a fellow student named Grace, but is later kidnapped by May's twin sister June, who believes that he and Charles killed May.
3	"Whatever You Want"	Viet Nguyen	Andrew Law	January 4, 2024
Charles catches up with Alexis before discovering Bruce has gone missing. Bruce finds himself imprisoned with TK, and he ends up bonding with June. With Eileen 's help, Charles tracks down where June is holding Bruce and TK. Bruce persuades Charles and June not to fight each other and convinces June of their innocence. June decides to ally with them to find her sister's killer.
4	"Square"	Kevin Tancharoen	Justin Calen-Chenn & Soojeong Son	January 4, 2024
Bruce invites Grace on a date to watch him audition for The Groundlings, where he is offered a spot with the improv group. Believing that another party may be behind the attacks, Charles sets up a meeting with Sleepy Chan's gang on neutral ground in a Korean mob-controlled spa, with the Koreans taking TK as collateral. After learning of the spa meeting, Alexis is attacked by a mole in the police force but fights off her assailant; she tries to warn Charles but is unable to reach him. At the spa, Bruce is taken and used as an intermediary between Sleepy Chan himself and Charles; however after a brief meeting Sleepy Chan is killed by assassins, who attack the two gangs. Bruce escapes with the help of Jade Dragon members Blood Boots and Xing, while a dazed Charles is rescued by Alexis.
5	"The Rolodex"	Viet Nguyen	Ally Seibert	January 4, 2024
Alexis takes Charles to her apartment and they sleep together; however he realizes that she is only using him to go after the triads. He leaves, unaware that she has placed a tracker on his phone. Bruce remembers that Sleepy Chan had told him that the men attacking them are after "the rolodex", which Eileen reveals to be herself: as a security measure she had memorized all the real identities of Taipei's triad leaders. Seeking to negotiate, Eileen lets herself be taken by the men attacking the triads, a group called the Boxers, who demand the names of the triad leaders. Unwilling to compromise, the Boxers execute a captured Blood Boots before Eileen is rescued by Bruce with the help of her friends. Eileen asks Bruce to commit the list of names to memory.
6	"Country Boy"	Viet Nguyen	Amy Wang	January 4, 2024
Eileen travels to Taipei and reunites with her mother and visits a still-comatose Big Sun, who wakes after she leaves. The brothers and their allies take refuge at actor John Cho's mansion, where Bruce invites Grace over. Grace tells Bruce that her parents were the victims of human trafficking, and after bringing him to a community center later reveals herself to be the leader of the Boxers, hoping to enact justice on the triads. Bruce gives up the list of names to her after she promises not to kill his brother, while Charles rescues TK from the Koreans.
7	"Gymkata"	Kevin Tancharoen	Jason Ning	January 4, 2024
Eileen returns to Los Angeles. Correctly predicting that Bruce would end up divulging the names of the triad leaders, Eileen had successfully warned them of the imminent attacks by the Boxers and informs them that they all must meet in Los Angeles to elect a new leader, the Dragon Head, in order to lead them through this crisis. Big Sun suddenly arrives, revealing that he had faked his coma in order to deceive his enemies and wants Charles to be the Dragon Head as a proxy for him. Bruce tries to persuade Charles and his mother to leave triad life behind but is unsuccessful. Desperate to get rid of the triads, Bruce tells Grace that all the triad leaders are meeting in the city; however she cannot guarantee Charles' safety this time. Alexis leads a taskforce to take the triads down and tracks Charles' phone to the meeting place. As the meeting commences, Bruce, TK and June sneak in hoping to get Charles to leave before the Boxers attack but he refuses. Eileen makes a surprise appearance, discrediting both Charles' and her husband's nominations for Dragon Head and putting her own hand up for the job. Just before the vote, Bruce discovers a bomb, throwing it down a garbage chute where it explodes just as the police and Boxers raid the meeting. During the ensuing melee, the police let the triads and Boxers fight each other while June kills Grace in revenge for her sister. Bruce flees with Eileen, while Charles escapes with his father. Charles reveals to Big Sun that Bruce betrayed them to the Boxers; Big Sun orders him to kill Bruce.
8	"Protect the Family"	Kevin Tancharoen	Brad Falchuk & Byron Wu	January 4, 2024
Charles tracks down Bruce and Eileen to a motel, but finds himself unable to kill Bruce. Bruce suggests Charles kill Big Sun to finally escape his influence, angering Charles, but Eileen reveals that his father manipulated him into becoming an assassin, leading her to escape with Bruce to the United States. However, she admits she harbors ambitions to take over the Jade Dragons herself. Charles returns to his father, who sends Xing to finish the job and Charles is arrested trying to stop her; however Eileen manages to kill Xing. Bruce visits Charles in jail and persuades him to tell him where Big Sun is hiding, asserting that he will kill his father himself. Bruce confronts Big Sun and shoots him in the stomach, only intending to wound him so that he would be arrested in hospital. Alexis starts proceedings against Big Sun and the triads but Eileen visits her husband in hospital and gives him an insulin overdose, ensuring he remains quiet and bedridden. Free of their father's influence, Bruce continues his studies and improv, Charles opens a pastry shop, and Eileen returns to Taipei with Charles in the hope of taking over the Jade Dragons.

== Reception ==
The review aggregator website Rotten Tomatoes reported an 84% approval rating with an average rating of 6.5/10, based on 44 critic reviews. The website's critics consensus reads, "While The Brothers Sun's mix of brutality and sweetness sometimes veers into tonal whiplash, inspired fight choreography and a terrific cast keep it a fun family affair." Metacritic, which uses a weighted average, assigned a score of 61 out of 100 based on 19 critics, indicating "generally favorable reviews".

=== Accolades ===
Year	Award	Category	Nominee(s)	Result	Ref.
2024	Primetime Creative Arts Emmy Awards	Outstanding Stunt Coordination for Comedy Programming	Justin Yu	Nominated	
