= This House Possessed =

- Genre: Horror; Thriller
- Written by: David Levinson
- Directed by: William Wiard
- Starring: Parker Stevenson; Lisa Eilbacher
- Music by: Billy Goldenberg
- Country of origin: United States
- Original language: English

Production
- Executive producer: Leonard Goldberg
- Producer: David Levinson
- Cinematography: Thomas Del Ruth
- Editor: Leon Carrere
- Production companies: Leonard Goldberg Productions; Mandy Productions; MGM

Original release
- Network: ABC
- Release: February 6, 1981

This House Possessed is a 1981 American made-for-television horror film directed by William Wiard and starring Parker Stevenson and Lisa Eilbacher.

== Plot ==
Following a nervous breakdown, a recuperating rock star and his young nurse discover the estate they've rented is harbouring secrets that could be deadly.

== Filming Location ==
Much of This House Possessed was shot in Rancho Santa Fe, California. The home is formally known as Del Dios Ranch. It was built in 1972 and designed by noted Laguna Beach architect Fred Briggs, while interior designer Arthur Elrod—famous for his Palm Springs aesthetic, magnified the mid-century look and feel inside the home's more than 8,000 square feet. It is located at 7010 El Camino Del Norte, Rancho Santa Fe, CA 92067. When the home was listed for sale in 2016, it was the most expensive private real estate listing in San Diego history.

== Cast ==
- Parker Stevenson as Gary Straihorn
- Lisa Eilbacher as Sheila Moore
- Joan Bennett as Rag Lady
- Slim Pickens as Arthur Keene
- Shelley Smith as Tanya
- Bill Morey as Robbins
- Jan Shutan as Helen
- David Paymer as Pasternak
- Jack Garner as Feeney
- K Callan as Lucille
- Barry Corbin as Lieutenant Fletcher
- John Dukakis as Donny
- Amanda Wyss as Holly
- Ivy Bethune as Martha
- Philip Baker Hall as Clerk (as Phillip Baker Hall)
