= Ryan's Four =

American medical drama television series

- Genre: Medical drama
- Created by: David Victor
- Starring: Tom Skerritt
- Country of origin: United States
- Original language: English
- No. of seasons: 1
- No. of episodes: 5

Production
- Running time: 60 minutes
- Production companies: Fair Dinkum Productions; Groverton Productions, Ltd. Paramount Television

Original release
- Network: ABC
- Release: April 5 – April 27, 1983

Ryan's Four is an American medical drama television series that aired from April 5 until April 27, 1983.

== Premise ==
A doctor acts as a guide for four interns at a medical center.

== Cast ==
- Tom Skerritt as Dr. Thomas Ryan
- Lisa Eilbacher as Dr. Ingrid Sorenson
- Tim Daly as Dr. Edward Gillian
- Albert Hall as Dr. Terry Wilson
- Dirk Blocker as Dr. Norman Rostov
- Nicolas Coster as Dr. Morris Whitford

== US television ratings ==
Season	Episodes	Start date	End date	Nielsen rank	Nielsen rating
1982–83	5	April 5, 1983	April 27, 1983	24	18.3 (Note: Tied with "That's Incredible" and "Archie Bunker's Place")

== Episodes ==
No.	Title	Original release date
1	"Pilot"	April 5, 1983
2	"Never Say Die"	April 6, 1983
A convict makes a break for it while undergoing a medical exam. Dr. Ryan treats an aging movie star, who has just been mugged.
3	"The Choice"	April 13, 1983
There's only one donor for two infants who need a life-saving transplant. Sorenson treats a young junkie. Gillian and Wilson try to find a lost dog at the hospital.
4	"Heartaches"	April 20, 1983
Gillian feels intimidated by his father, who is a surgeon. Sorenson becomes friends with a lonely hypochondriac. Wilson tries some homemade remedies for the common cold.
5	"Couples"	April 27, 1983
A young heart attack victim is afraid that he can't go back to a normal life again. Sorenson's boyfriend thinks that she spends too much time with her patients and not enough with him.
