= Show Me the Monkey =

- Veronica Mars episode
- Episode no.: Season 3 Episode 10
- Directed by: Nick Marck
- Story by: John Enbom
- Teleplay by: John Enbom; Robert Hull
- Production code: 3T5810
- Original air date: January 23, 2007

Guest appearances
- Patrick Fabian as Hank Landry; David Tom as Chip Diller; Jaime Ray Newman as Mindy O'Dell; Michael Mitchell as Bronson Pope; Eric Jungmann as Gil Thomas Pardy; Linara Washington as Pauline Elliot; Jackie Tohn as Sarah #3; Brittany Ishibashi as Emmy; Brandon Hillock as Deputy Jerry Sacks

Episode chronology
← Previous "Spit & Eggs"	Next → "Poughkeepsie, Tramps and Thieves"
- Veronica Mars season 3

"Show Me the Monkey" is the tenth episode of the third season of the American mystery television series Veronica Mars, and the fifty-fourth episode overall. Written by John Enbom and Robert Hull and directed by Nick Marck, the episode premiered on The CW on January 23, 2007. The series depicts the adventures of Veronica Mars (Kristen Bell) as she deals with life as a college student while moonlighting as a private detective.

In this episode, Veronica is hired by researchers to solve the disappearance of a Capuchin monkey being used for animal testing on non-human primates. However, she has a change of heart after infiltrating an animal rights group as part of the case. Meanwhile, Piz (Chris Lowell) becomes increasingly friendly and gives her advice, but after a heartfelt talk about love, Veronica decides to start dating Logan again. In addition, Keith (Enrico Colantoni) starts investigating Dean O'Dell's (Ed Begley, Jr.) mysterious death.

"Show Me the Monkey" was initially intended to have a cameo appearance by Ted Nugent, but when the writers could not schedule him, they changed the name of the character to Ed Argent. The eponymous monkey is played by live animal actor Katie, known for her role on Friends. In its original airing, the episode received 3.23 million viewers and positive reviews from television critics. Rowan Kaiser of The A.V. Club called "Show Me the Monkey" one of the best of the season, while Eric Goldman of IGN lauded Mac's new love interest. However, Keith McDuffee of AOL TV did not like the development of the love triangle between Logan, Piz, and Veronica.

== Plot synopsis ==
Keith (Enrico Colantoni) is visited by Mindy O’Dell (Jamie Ray Newman), who wants to hire him to investigate Dean O’Dell's (Ed Begley, Jr.) death. Mac (Tina Majorino) is called in for tech support when an animal research lab is raided and a valuable monkey is stolen, and Mac asks Veronica for help. The researchers believe that a PETA-like organization, named PHAT (People for Humane Animal Treatment), is responsible. At the PHAT meeting, Mac flirts with the group leader, Bronson (Michael Mitchell) but there is no reason to think that they're guilty. Weevil (Francis Capra) invites Keith to investigate Dean O’Dell's office, and he finds a 40-year-old bottle of scotch unopened. At the next PHAT meeting, Veronica is asked to take action for animal rights in any way she sees fit. Keith believes the bottle of scotch is evidence of murder, as someone about to commit suicide would be more likely to crack open the good stuff. Back at the lab, Veronica notices a coworker being mean to the monkey researchers. After a slight hazing ritual, Veronica and Mac are accepted into the group. In order to impress the leader of the group, Veronica, Mac, and Parker (Julie Gonzalo) participate in a party.

Mac leaves the party early, but the leader of the group appears at her room. When he tries to kiss her, she pulls away. Logan (Jason Dohring) and Dick (Ryan Hansen) go surfing. When Mac, Parker, and Veronica go to the leader's house, they find a woman, but he invites them in anyway. Veronica finds cages of rats in Bronson's house, but he says that they showed up on his doorstep one day. Logan has sex with a surfer woman, and when the police show up at Bronson's house to inquire after the stolen rats, they find them gone, as Mac tipped Bronson off. She tells Veronica she found leaves while checking out the lab's hard drive, which Veronica discovers are green tea. She shows them to the coworker, Emi, and discovers that Emi stole one of the monkey's toys.

After doing some more searching, Veronica discovers that one of the lab researchers, Gil, actually stole the monkey after developing a special bond with it. Gil knew he could blame it on PHAT. Veronica decides to tell the other lab members that she was unable to find the monkey, although she is surprised to learn that they will quickly get another monkey. Mac goes to Bronson's house where she asks him on a date and the two share a kiss. Veronica has a heartfelt conversation with Piz, although soon afterward, she goes back to Logan. Keith decides to take the case of Dean O’Dell's death. The next morning, Piz walks up to Veronica excitedly, but Logan appears, making things awkward and causing Piz to leave sadly.

== Production ==
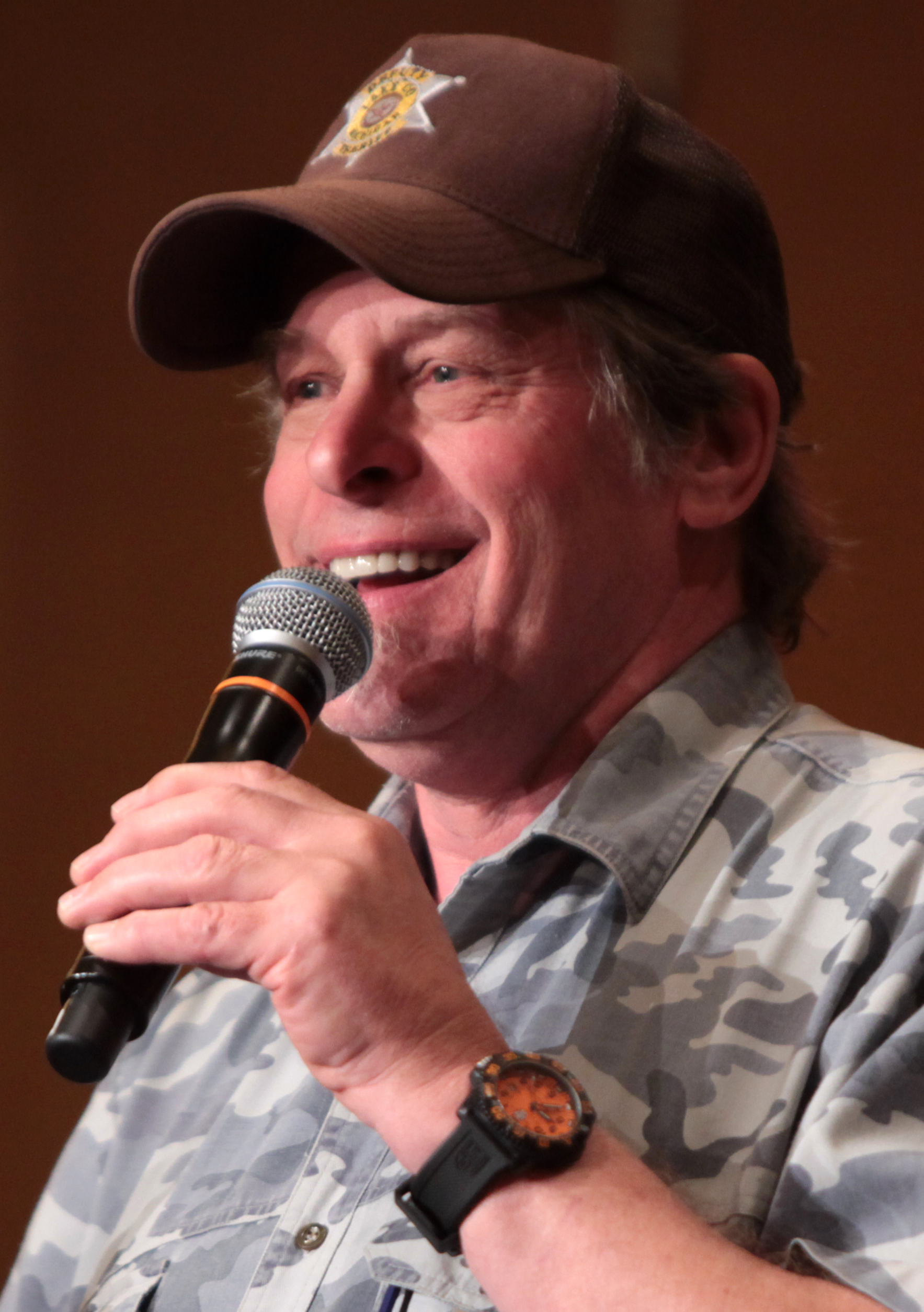
The character of Ed Argent was initially supposed to be a cameo appearance by Ted Nugent (pictured).

"Show Me the Monkey" was co-written by John Enbom and Robert Hull and directed by Nick Marck, marking Enbom's thirteenth writing credit and Hull's first writing credit for the show. As a joke in the episode's script, Enbom and Hull added the name of the lab worker who stole the monkey as "Gil Thomas Pardy", although his name is not mentioned directly in the episode. A condensed version of this name, Gil T. Pardy, is an intentional pun on "guilty party". The character of rock star Ed Argent was initially supposed to be a cameo appearance from musician Ted Nugent, but when he did not appear on the show due to scheduling conflicts, the writers changed the character's name in order to make it a reference to the band Argent, best known for their song "Hold Your Head Up". The episode references Wikipedia when Veronica looks up the origins of the color manila.

The stolen capuchin monkey named Oscar is played by live animal actor Katie, best known for playing Marcel, Ross Geller's pet monkey, on the sitcom Friends. Near the time of the episode's airing, she had also appeared in Bruce Almighty and an episode of 30 Rock. When the episode's editor first received one take of the scene in which Veronica and Mac sarcastically dance in response to accusations of doing a poor job on a school project, the editor called the writing staff into the editing room; they proceeded to view the scene fifteen times because of its humorous nature. They immediately included the take in the final cut of the episode.

== Reception ==
In its original United States broadcast, "Show Me the Monkey" received 3.23 million viewers, marking a decrease in viewers from "Spit & Eggs" and ranking 92nd of 103 in the weekly rankings.

The episode received positive reviews from television critics. Eric Goldman of IGN gave the episode an 8.2 out of 10, indicating that it was "great". Writing that it was entertaining and developed the plot well, he also lauded Mac's reappearance and her new love interest, opining that it created some interesting character moments for Mac. He was also pleased that the episode "ultimately ended on an optimistic note for Mac and her potential new guy." However, he thought that the episode, as well as the show in general, could not handle controversial issues such as animal testing delicately. Keith McDuffee of AOL TV gave mixed opinions on the development of the show's romantic relationships in the episode; he commented, "And as for Piz trying to woo Veronica a bit, I actually found myself saying "thank God" when [Veronica] was at Logan's door later in the episode." He compared Piz negatively to Logan at the beginning of the first season, and stated that "alas, Piz will have his chance again soon." Television Without Pity graded the episode an "A".

Rowan Kaiser, writing for The A.V. Club, praised the episode, arguing that "this is one of the few episodes so far that is both satisfying on its own and uses the higher education setting as a strength, instead of fighting it as a weakness." She praised the episode's treatment of the animal rights group as well as Mac's prominent role. She also lauded Keith's investigation into the dean's death, particularly the scene in which he encounters Veronica's criminology professor in a bar, which Kaiser described as "Keith discovering someone who may well be a match for him intellectually." Reviewer Alan Sepinwall, on his blog What's Alan Watching?, enjoyed the episode, calling the main plot the "Best Mystery of the Week in quite some time." In addition, he enjoyed the contrast between Veronica and Keith's methods of undercover work, writing that Veronica is less subtle in this area. In addition, he praised the more humorous aspects of the episode, particularly the performances in this regard by Bell and Majorino.
