= The HBO Voyeur Project =

The HBO Voyeur Project was a theatrical multimedia experience and marketing campaign launched in the summer of 2007 using voyeurism as a vehicle. Content related to the characters is scattered online in fictional web pages, in photo and video clips on media sharing platforms such as Flickr and YouTube, in blogs and social networks, on the HBO channels, and through mobile content. The focus seems to be on people living in eight fictional apartments on the corner of Broome Street and Ludlow Street. The display was projecting on a massive scale on the side of a building on Broome and Ludlow street on June 28 – July 1, from 9–11pm, and again from July 5–8. The site's slogan was "See what people do when they think no one is Watching." The residences and their respective stories appear in New York City.

== Story ==
There are 5 story locations with their respective addresses:

- West 41st Street, "The Artist"
- East 85th Street, "The Housewife"
- Prince Street, "The Meditator"
- West 72nd Street, "The Mortician"
- Broome & Ludlow with 8 individual stories:
  - Apartment 1A, "The Tempted"
  - Apartment 1B, "The Departure"
  - Apartment 2A, "The Discovery"
  - Apartment 2B, "The Proposal"
  - Apartment 3A, "The Killer Within"
  - Apartment 3B, "The Grown-Up Table"
  - Apartment 4A, "The Delivery"
  - Apartment 4B, "The Temptress"

Broome & Ludlow seems to be the focal point of the series with the idea of one story of the entire apartment complex consisting of 8 other sub-stories that all relate to each other. The stories appear to involve murder, violence, romance, marriage, and cheating.

== HBO Voyeur On Demand ==
HBO Subscribers can also watch additional materials related to the online site via HBO On Demand, including an additional story "The Watcher", trailers for the online site, and paired apartment storylines from "Ludlow & Broome".

== Development ==
The Project was developed for HBO by Omnicom Group's ad agency BBDO. BBDO NY's Content Department hired production company RSA to shoot the content, Asylum for post-production & special effects, Search Party for original music, Big Spaceship for the site and PHD for media buying. The main wall film as well as "The Watcher" were directed by Jake Scott and the 4 exclusive interactive stories were directed by Chris Nelson.

The Project includes the main website, HBO On Demand and HBO Mobile exclusive content, MySpace pages for the characters from the stories, supporting websites, and additional content for those willing to follow the breadcrumbs or "artifacts" hidden in the other media. Clues and discussion about voyeur artifacts were posted on a promotional blog which has since been removed. The project was estimated to have cost between $7 and $10 million, and took about a year to create.

== Viewer response ==
HBO Voyeur received a lot of critical praise, but it was also heavily criticized by its viewers for being too vague in what they were trying to accomplish, as well as hosting some content on mediums that excluded large portions of their audience. Many responses admitted that they didn't get the purpose of the project, and some even went as far as to call the video portions "pointless" in the absence of a clear interactive experience.

Some of the players who had advanced knowledge of the storyline also chastised the project for ending too abruptly, which left large plot holes, such as how characters were connected, and also complained that some of the characters seemed to have very little thought put into them, outside of their setup in the original movie sequences.

== Attribution dispute ==
In June 2008, HBO Voyeur collected several high-profile awards at Cannes, "including two Grand Prix trophies in the outdoor and promotion categories, five Golds, a Silver and a Bronze in media, cyber, design promotion and film.". Despite the collaboration between multiple agencies and partners, sole credit for the campaign was given to BBDO. Speaking to AdWeek, Michael Lebowitz, the CEO of BBDO's digital partner Big Spaceship, suggested that the current awards system is incapable of correctly recognizing the relative contributions of smaller agencies. These comments sparked an ongoing debate over who should receive attribution for multiplatform projects that leverage the expertise of multiple partners and agencies.
