= We Interrupt This Program... (play) =

- Original language: English
- Written by: Norman Krasna
- Genre: mystery

Premiere
- Date: April 1, 1975

We Interrupt This Program... is a 1975 play by Norman Krasna.

In 1975 ABC provided $125,000 for a production by Alexander Cohen. The play premiered in 1975 and received bad reviews.

== Plot ==
This play's audience is held hostage by a group of criminals seeking the release of an imprisoned friend.
