= Infamous (2020 film) =

2020 American crime thriller film

- Theatrical release poster
- Directed by: Joshua Caldwell
- Written by: Joshua Caldwell
- Produced by: Colin Bates; Michael Jefferson; Scott Levenson; Shaun Sanghani
- Starring: Bella Thorne; Jake Manley; Amber Riley; Michael Sirow; Marisa Coughlan
- Cinematography: Eve Cohen
- Edited by: Will Torbett
- Music by: Bill Brown
- Production companies: SSS Entertainment; Highland Film Group; SSS Film Capital; Lucidity Entertainment; Beer Money Worldwide; EL Ride Productions
- Distributed by: Vertical Entertainment
- Release date: June 12, 2020 (United States)
- Running time: 100 minutes
- Country: United States
- Language: English
- Box office: $429,148

Infamous is a 2020 American crime thriller film written and directed by Joshua Caldwell. It stars Bella Thorne, Jake Manley, Amber Riley, Michael Sirow and Marisa Coughlan. It follows the story of two young lovers robbing their way across the southern United States starting in Florida, posting their exploits to social media, and gaining fame and followers as a result.

The film was released on June 12, 2020, by Vertical Entertainment, and received negative reviews from critics, although Thorne's performance was praised.

== Plot ==
Arielle lives in Florida with her mother Janet, who has a deadbeat boyfriend named Bobby. Arielle enjoys social media and has few followers. One night, she goes to a party where she gets into a fight and beats up a girl while everyone at the party films the fight and posts it on social media. Arielle immediately gains 147 new followers.

Dean Taylor is new to town and stays with his father. Arielle meets him while he is working on his car. They spend time together at a party, where Dean reveals he was in prison for armed robbery and assault, and that his parole requires him to be with his father since his mother is dead. His father is an abusive drunk. She tells him how badly she wants to get out of Florida and go to Hollywood to be famous.

One day, Arielle finds all her saved money missing. Right away, she bursts into Janet's room where she and Bobby are in bed. Arielle accuses Bobby of stealing her money and attacks Bobby, but Bobby pushes her and she hits her head against the wall. Arielle leaves after threatening to kill him. She goes to Dean's home and finds his father beating him. Arielle tries to intervene but again gets hit on her head after getting thrown to the ground. Dean fights his father who ends up falling down the stairs and dies after hitting his head. Arielle and Dean begin to leave town right away but realizing that they have no money, they decide to rob a gas station with Dean's gun. Arielle livestreams as Dean commits the robbery. Dean is unaware of being live streamed.

Arielle sees that her social media account has three thousand followers. Dean becomes angry when he learns that Arielle has been live streaming their crimes, but Arielle says she used IP blocker and did not show their faces. She says it will lead to fame and money. Still short on money, Dean suggests they rob a dispensary next. This time, Dean films as Arielle does the robbing.

With more crimes filmed, Arielle's account gains over three million followers. Eventually, the police identify them and Dean and Arielle see their faces on the news. Dean is angry about the social media, but Arielle is elated to be famous. On the road, they get pulled over, and Dean tells Arielle not to start anything. When the officer goes to check their IDs, Arielle exits the car and shoots the officer.

Arielle and Dean go into hiding for a while and this leads to Arielle losing her subscribers and followers. Dean and Arielle get into an argument where Dean tries to make her realize about how serious a crime she committed whereas Arielle says that she did it for him but Dean disagrees as he thinks she did it for fame. Even though they have enough money and do not need anymore, Arielle goes off on her own to commit a robbery at a gas station and accidentally kills a customer who startled her. The clerk manages to grab a gun and shoots Arielle in the shoulder as she flees.

Dean is extremely upset that everyone now knows where they are. The police have found them and thus begins a car chase and a shootout. They realize that they left their money behind. Once they get away from the police, Dean removes the bullet from her shoulder. Arielle takes pictures of her wounds for her followers, making Dean angry again. Dean blames Arielle for the whole situation since her coming over led to his father's death. Arielle slaps him repeatedly and then kisses him. A woman, Elle, driving by sees Arielle and the broken down truck. She pulls over to help and Arielle pulls out her gun and says they need a place to stay for a night. Elle reveals she follows Arielle online and that she knew who they were before she pulled up. At Elle's place, Dean asks her why she follows Arielle. Elle explains that her life has not worked out and that people find them empowering. Dean tells her no one should want to be like them.

The next day, Elle drives them through a police checkpoint. Once they are through, they give Elle a bottle of water and take her car, directing her to walk back to the gas station they passed and to report her car stolen to get the insurance reimbursement. Elle wants to go with them, but Dean refuses. Arielle takes a picture with her and posts it, telling her lots of people are going to want to talk to her after that. Arielle and Dean drive off.

Later, they stop at the home of Kyle, Dean's contact. Kyle's crew plans to rob a bank but needs an extra gunmen. Arielle wants in, but Dean thinks it is a bad idea. He wants to leave and go to Mexico, but Arielle holds firm, wanting the money and the followers. Dean makes Arielle promise that if they do this job she will leave with him after.

During the robbery, even though Kyle insisted on no social media, Arielle streams it to her five million followers. On the other hand, Kyle becomes upset after not being able to find the money they expected and in anger shoots a bank worker. As they are about to leave, they find cops already outside surrounding the bank. Kyle realizes it is because Arielle streamed the bank robbery and (accidentally) the name of the bank. Kyle and his crew get into a shootout with Arielle and Dean where Kyle and Dean end up shooting each other dead. The police arrest Arielle and as they bring her out of the bank, she sees hundreds of fans and followers with signs cheering her, giving her fame that she always wanted.

== Cast ==
- Bella Thorne as Arielle Summers
- Jake Manley as Dean Taylor
- Amber Riley as Elle
- Michael Sirow as Kyle
- Marisa Coughlan as Janet

== Production ==
In February 2019, it was announced Bella Thorne had joined the cast of the film, then titled Southland with Joshua Caldwell directing from a screenplay he wrote before the title was changed to Infamous. In May 2019, Jake Manley joined the cast of the film. In July 2019, Amber Riley and Michael Sirow joined the cast of the film.

Principal photography began in July 2019, taking part in Guthrie, Oklahoma and other smaller towns around the state.

== Release ==
In May 2020, Vertical Entertainment acquired distribution rights to the film. It was released on video-on-demand and in a select number of theaters (mostly drive-ins) on June 12, 2020.

== Reception ==
=== Box office ===
Infamous made $160,371 from 58 theaters in its opening weekend, finishing second among reported films. In its second weekend the film made $94,984 from 37 theaters (dropping 41%) and then $36,592 from nine.

=== Critical response ===
On review aggregator website Rotten Tomatoes, the film holds an approval rating of 21% based on 29 reviews, with an average rating of 4.4/10. The site's critics consensus reads: "Infamous attempts to level an indictment against modern youth, but only manages to offer a forgettable story with little of interest to say." On Metacritic, the film has a weighted average score of 40 out of 100, based on six critics, indicating "mixed or average" reviews.

Molly Freeman from Screen Rant wrote that the film "serves as an exciting crime thriller and a compelling look at what - in a most extreme case - will drive someone to do anything for fame. Caldwell's movie, thanks to his directing eye and the work of cinematographer Eve Cohen, is also beautiful to watch, depicting a stylized and hyperreal version of reality that mixes with the grit and grime of real life." Joe Leyden of Variety called the film "a warmed-over 'Bonnie and Clyde' for the social media era" and wrote: "One can always make the argument that it's not absolutely necessary to have sympathetic protagonists for a drama to enthrall or enlighten. But Infamous pushes way, way too far in the opposite direction: Dean and especially Arielle seem so irredeemably psychotic even before they begin to mount a body count, you actively wish for them to be caught or killed."

Writing for RogerEbert.com, Nick Allen gave the film 2/4 stars and praised Thorne for having "the classically great presence of someone like Sandra Bullock, but with her own scraggly edge ... Thorne dominates numerous scenes that catapult her character from clout-hungry wannabe to gun-selfie superstar." However, he criticized Manley's performance, saying, "Clyde to Thorne's Bonnie is a total dud."

== See also ==
- Bonnie and Clyde
- Natural Born Killers
