= Parental abuse =

Parental abuse or parent abuse can refer to:

- Parental abuse by children, maltreatment of a parent by their child or children
- Parental abuse of children, maltreatment or neglect of a child or children by a parent

== See also ==
- Bullying
