= Be Somebody (2016 film) =

- Film poster
- Directed by: Joshua Caldwell
- Written by: Lamar Damon
- Produced by: Gary Binkow; Amee Dolleman
- Starring: Matthew Espinosa; Sarah Jeffery; Allison Paige; Tava Smiley
- Cinematography: Eve Cohen
- Edited by: Will Torbett
- Music by: Bowie Dinkel; Kelvin Pimont
- Production company: Studio 71
- Distributed by: Paramount Pictures
- Release date: June 10, 2016
- Running time: 88 minutes
- Country: United States
- Language: English
- Box office: $15,395

Be Somebody is a 2016 romantic comedy film, directed by Joshua Caldwell. The film stars Vine blogger Matthew Espinosa as Jordan Jaye, a pop star who disappears from his own tour to escape his demanding mother.

== Plot ==
Jordan Jaye (Matthew Espinosa) is a teenage pop star on tour. While at a pit stop, Jordan gets off the bus, but the bus takes off before he can get back on. As he walks around town, he stops to take a look at a poster until a group of fans sees him and chases him. As he runs away, he bumps into Emily Lowe (Sarah Jeffery), who couldn't care less about Jordan and his status as a star, while she is delivering pizzas.

Jordan convinces Emily to give him a ride away. After Emily drives him away, Jordan convinces her to hide him for the night. Emily reluctantly agrees and the two hide out at a bowling ally until Emily's parents go to bed. Emily then sneaks Jordan into her room for the night.

The following day, Jordan convinces Emily to use her interest in art, and specifically her interest in street art, and share her designs with people by tagging the school. Before they go and do that, they bump into a former friend of Emily's, taking her down a notch. Then, as she has gotten through to her parents (thanks to Jordan), her parents convince them to have a sit-down meal together. Later, as they tag the school, the two bond over their feelings of not knowing what to do with their crafts and their futures.

They inspire one another to take charge of their own lives. Emily becomes inspired to apply to art school, he gives himself breaks off from his concerts, and in the end, he turns up in a tux and with a limo to accompany her to her prom.

== Cast ==
- Matthew Espinosa as Jordan Jaye
- Sarah Jeffery as Emily Lowe
- Allison Paige as Jessica
- Tava Smiley as Mrs. Jaye
- LaMonica Garrett as Richard Lowe
- Caitlin Keats as Karen Lowe
- Mahaley Patel as Kelsey
