= Jake Manley =

Canadian actor (born 1991)

- Born: August 23, 1991 (age 34); Oakville, Ontario, Canada
- Occupation: Actor
- Years active: 2012–present
- Spouse: Jocelyn Hudon (m. 2021)

Jake Manley (born August 23, 1991) is a Canadian actor, best known for his roles as Jack Morton in the Netflix series The Order, Brad in the NBC series Heroes Reborn, Fisher Webb in the CW series iZombie, Shane in A Dog’s Journey (2019), George Waller in Brotherhood (2019), Dean Taylor in Infamous (2020), and York in Holidate (2020).

== Early life ==
Manley was born in Oakville, Ontario. He attended and graduated from Holy Trinity Catholic Secondary School.

== Career ==
In 2012, Manley made his acting debut in the CW drama series, Beauty & the Beast. Following on from his first role, Manley won other roles on a variety of TV shows including Cracked, Heroes Reborn, iZombie, and American Gods.

In 2017, it was reported that Manley would star alongside Gage Munroe and Dylan Everett in the film Brotherhood.

On April 17, 2018, it was announced by Deadline that Manley would star in a main role as Jack Morton in the Netflix horror-drama series, The Order.

In 2019, Manley starred as Willie West in Roland Emmerich's war film Midway.

In May 2019, Manley was cast in the Netflix romantic comedy Holidate. In the same month, it was announced that Manley would star alongside Bella Thorne in the heist thriller film Infamous. The film was released on June 12, 2020.

== Personal life ==
Manley began dating actress Jocelyn Hudon in 2015. The couple got engaged on August 26, 2020. They eloped in Las Vegas on Halloween 2021. Currently, they reside in Los Angeles, California.

== Filmography ==
=== Film ===
Year	Title	Role	Notes
2015	Bad Hair Day	Kyle Timmons	
2017	Nanny Nightmare	Owen	
2018	Seven in Heaven	Derek	
2019	A Dog's Journey	Shane	
2019	Midway	Willie West	
2019	Brotherhood	George Waller	
2020	Infamous	Dean Taylor	
2020	Holidate	York	
2022	Pursuit	Detective Mike Breslin	
2023	Welcome to Redville	Leo	
2024	Outlaw Posse	Southpaw	
2025	Find Your Friends	Jake	
2026	Do Not Enter	Rick	

=== Television ===
Year	Title	Role	Notes
2012	Beauty & the Beast	Derek Moore	Episode: "Out of Control"
2013	Cracked	Kyle Alpern	Episode: "Cherry Blossoms"
2015	Heroes Reborn	Brad	Recurring role
2016	American Gothic	Young Tom Price	Episode: "Freedom from Fear"
2017	American Gods	Bartholomew	Episode: "A Prayer for Mad Sweeney"
2017	Casual	Harvard	Episode: "Troubleshooting"
2018	Trollville	Daniel	Episodes: "Sex Party" and "Broken Chair"
2018	iZombie	Fisher Webb	Recurring role
2019	Project Blue Book	Toby McManus	Episode: "The Fuller Dogfight"
2019–2020	The Order	Jack Morton	Main role
2021	One of a Kind Love	Ryan Sawyer	Hallmark Channel Television Movie
2023	The Consultant	Patrice	Episodes: "Elephant", "Hammer"
2023	Love in the Maldives	Jared Joseph	Hallmark Channel Television Movie
2025	My Life with the Walter Boys	Wylder Holt	Recurring role
