= The Starter Wife =

The Starter Wife may refer to:

- The Starter Wife, a 2006 novel by Gigi Levangie Grazer
- The Starter Wife (miniseries), a 2007 television miniseries based on the novel
- The Starter Wife (TV series), a television series, a sequel to the miniseries of the same name

== See also ==
- Starter marriage
