= Descendants 3 (soundtrack) =

Soundtrack album by Descendants cast
- Released: August 2, 2019
- Recorded: April–May 2018
- Genre: Pop
- Length: 36:03
- Label: Walt Disney
- Producer: Andy Morin Zach Hill

Singles from Descendants 3
- 1. "Good to Be Bad" Released: May 31, 2019; 2. "VK Mashup" Released: July 19, 2019; 3. "Queen of Mean" Released: August 2, 2019

Descendants 3 is a soundtrack album by the cast of the film of the same name, released on August 2, 2019 by Walt Disney Records. The soundtrack was announced on May 31, 2019, with the lead single "Good to be Bad" being released on the same date. Two other songs: "VK Mashup" and "Queen of Mean" were released on July 19 and August 2, respectively; the latter accompanied the soundtrack release.

The album reached number 7 on the Billboard 200 album chart, earning over 36,000 album-equivalent units, out of which 23,000 were pure sales. It further topped the Billboard Kid Albums chart, and further debuted at multiple chart positions in Australia, Canada and France. It also received a nomination for Top Soundtrack at the 2020 Billboard Music Awards which was lost to the soundtrack of Frozen II.

== Background ==
Descendants 3 was released on August 2, 2019, along with the parent film, and featured 13 tracks, with much of the songs are written originally for the film. Also included in the album are: "Dig a Little Deeper" from the 2009 film The Princess and the Frog, two songs from the first film's soundtrack, "Did I Mention" and a remixed version of "Rotten to the Core".

Steven Vincent, Disney Channel's VP of music and soundtracks, said in an interview to Variety, that he went "through the script looking for musical opportunities where could we use big numbers and where could we do character numbers". He added that Sofia Carson's character Evie did not have a song herself in the first two films, hence he "looked for a spot where she could have a number to herself and it would be fresh for this film".

About the opening number, "Good to be Bad", songwriter Antonina Armato, who worked on the first two films, had said that "We wanted to make sure that those lyrics made you feel like, it was a celebration. These are the misfit kids and they have a sense of pride all of a sudden. Maybe we’re the bad kids. Maybe we’re the bad apples, but guess what? We made applesauce and it tastes good and everyone is stoked." On the song "Queen of Mean" sung by Sarah Jeffery as Audrey, Armato added " At first, her character was always doing the right thing and, all of a sudden, everything you thought was gonna happen didn’t and she said, “Well, I could either take this or I can empower myself.” ... I thought a lot of young girls would enjoy that sort of just the way it sounds. It was fun and Sarah embodied that song in such a great way."

== Commercial performance ==
The soundtrack debuted at number seven on the Billboard 200 with 36,000 album-equivalent units, slightly less than the soundtracks of the first two films, earning 42,000 and 46,000 respectively. It subsequently fell to number 14, the following week. It topped the Billboard Kid Albums chart and also debuted at number 10 on the UK Soundtrack Albums Chart, while being further charted at Australia, Canada, and France in numbers 36 and 166, respectively. The accompanying music videos released for the soundtrack, earned around 285 million views on the Disney Music's Vevo channel.

== Singles ==
"Good to Be Bad", performed by Dove Cameron, Sofia Carson, Cameron Boyce, Booboo Stewart, Anna Cathcart and Jadah Marie, was released as a single on May 31, 2019, along with the pre-order of the soundtrack. "VK Mashup" was released as the second single on July 19, which contains samples of "Rotten to the Core", "Ways to Be Wicked", and "Good to be Bad" from the first three films.

The track "Queen of Mean" was released on August 2, along with the soundtrack and debuted at number 67 on the Billboard Hot 100 becoming Jeffery's first entry on the chart, one of the highest-charting songs from the Descendants franchise as well as the highest charting solo song from any of the films; it further spent eight consecutive weeks on the Billboard Hot 100 becoming the longest charting Descendants song. It also featured at number 57 on the Canadian Hot 100, and number 89 on the UK Singles Chart. The CLOUDxCITY remix of "Queen of Mean" was released on October 13, 2019, while also featuring a mashup of "What's My Name" from the second film.

=== Other charted songs ===
After the film's soundtrack release, "Night Falls", performed by Dove Cameron, Sofia Carson, Cameron Boyce, Booboo Stewart, China Anne McClain, Thomas Doherty and Dylan Playfair, debuted at number 84 on the Billboard Hot 100.

== Track listing ==
Descendants 3 (Original TV Movie Soundtrack) – Standard edition
No.	Title	Writer(s)	Performer(s)	Length
1.	"Good to Be Bad"	Tim James; Antonina Armato; Tom Sturges; Adam Schmalholz	Dove Cameron; Sofia Carson; Cameron Boyce; Booboo Stewart; Anna Cathcart; Jadah Marie	3:09
2.	"Queen of Mean"	James; Armato; Sturges; Schmalholz	Sarah Jeffery	3:09
3.	"Do What You Gotta Do"	Matt Wong; Jamie Jones; Jack Kugell	Cameron; Cheyenne Jackson	2:57
4.	"Night Falls"	James; Armato; Sturges; Schmalholz	Cameron; Boyce; Carson; Stewart; Marie; China Anne McClain; Thomas Doherty; Dylan Playfair	3:08
5.	"One Kiss"	Matt Tishler; Paula Wingler	Carson; Cameron; McClain	2:29
6.	"My Once Upon a Time"	John Kavanaugh; David Goldsmith	Cameron	3:48
7.	"Break This Down"	Jodie Shihadeh; James K. Petrie; Doug Davis; Ben Hostetler; Nikki Sorrentino; Susan Paroff; Anthony Mirabella; Pipo Fernandez; Ali Dee Theodore	Cameron; Boyce; Carson; Stewart; McClain; Jeffery; Doherty; Playfair; Cathcart; Marie; Mitchell Hope; Brenna D'Amico; Zachary Gibson	3:29
8.	"Dig a Little Deeper"	Randy Newman	McClain	2:57
9.	"Did I Mention"	Adam Schlesinger	Hope	0:29
10.	"Rotten to the Core" (D3 Remix)	Shelly Peiken; Johan Alknas; Joacim Persson	Cameron; Boyce; Carson; Stewart; McClain; Jeffery; Doherty; Marie	2:47
11.	"Happy Birthday"	Traditional	Jeffery	0:36
12.	"VK Mashup"	James; Armato; Sturges; Schmalholz; Pieken; Alkenas; Persson; Grant P Michaels; Charity Daw	Cameron; Boyce; Carson; Stewart	1:59
13.	"Descendants 3 Score Suite"	David Lawrence	David Lawrence	5:01

== Charts ==
=== Weekly ===
Chart (2019–2024)	Peak position
Australian Albums (ARIA)	36
Belgian Albums (Ultratop Flanders)	109
Canadian Albums (Billboard)	36
Dutch Albums (Album Top 100)	74
French Albums (SNEP)	166
Spanish Albums (PROMUSICAE)	82
UK Compilation Albums (Official Charts)	21
UK Soundtrack Albums (OCC)	10
US Billboard 200	7
US Kid Albums (Billboard)	1
US Soundtrack Albums (Billboard)	1

=== Year-end ===
Chart (2019)	Position
US Soundtrack Albums (Billboard)	15
Chart (2020)	Position
US Soundtrack Albums (Billboard)	21

== Certifications ==
Region	Certification	Certified units/sales
United Kingdom (BPI)	Gold	100,000^{‡}
^{‡} Sales+streaming figures based on certification alone.
