= Starter marriage =

First marriage that lasts five years or less and ends without children

A starter marriage is a first marriage that lasts five years or less and ends without the couple having any children together.

The concept of starter marriages was first discussed in a 1994 New York Times article by Deborah Schupack. Then, in a 2002 book, The Starter Marriage and the Future of Matrimony, Pamela Paul analyzed historical trends in American matrimony, pointing out that, as of 2002, Americans were getting married only slightly older than 100 years before, but that they were living decades longer. (In fact, Americans of Generation X are getting married at a rate closer to that of their grandparents than of their Baby Boomer parents.) She also claimed that some young couples get married for reasons not strong enough to support a long relationship, and that an increasing number of them end their marriages quickly. Paul's book caused controversy for suggesting that these divorces are a good thing, if the couple have not had children.

Numerous celebrities cited as having starter marriages include Drew Barrymore, Uma Thurman, Angelina Jolie, and Jennifer Lopez.

== Etymology of starter marriage ==
The term, a play on the expression "starter home", appears as one of the footnotes in Douglas Coupland's 1991 novel Generation X. Published usage of the term grew significantly after "'Starter Marriages': So Early, So Brief", a New York Times article by Deborah Schupack, as well as the subsequent publication of Pamela Paul's 2002 book The Starter Marriage and the Future of Matrimony.

In 2005, Kate Harrison's The Starter Marriage: A Novel and Gigi Levangie Grazer's The Starter Wife referenced Paul's use of the term. The latter became the basis for a USA Network miniseries of the same name in 2007, and a television series that ran from 2008 to 2009, though it expanded the use of the term since the starter marriage in question had produced a daughter.
