= Levangie =

Levangie or LeVangie is a surname. Notable people with the surname include:

- Dana LeVangie (born 1969), American baseball scout and coach
- Gigi Levangie (born 1963), American novelist, screenwriter, and television producer
