= Queen of Mean (disambiguation) =

Queen of Mean is the nickname of American businesswoman and real estate entrepreneur Leona Helmsley (1920–2007).

Queen of Mean may also refer to:

== People ==
- Lisa Lampanelli (born 1961), American comedian
- Kathy Long (born 1964), American retired five time world kickboxing champion and mixed martial arts fighter
- Anne Robinson (born 1944), British presenter and game show host
- Florence King (1936–2016), American novelist, essayist and columnist

== Other ==
- "Queen of Mean" (song), a song performed by Sarah Jeffery, featured in the 2019 TV film Descendants 3
- Angelica Pickles, a character in the Nickelodeon animated shows Rugrats and All Grown Up!
