= Leigh Ann Orsi =

American former actress

- Occupation: Actress
- Years active: Acting: 1985–1995

Leigh Ann Orsi is a former actress.

She is best known for playing Brad's (Zachery Ty Bryan) second girlfriend, Ashley, on the sitcom Home Improvement. Also featured as Hannah in the 1994 film, The Favor starring Brad Pitt. She also appeared for one season on the drama Life Goes On, as Zoe, Becca (Kellie Martin) and Corky's (Chris Burke) cousin. Her last acting credit was the 1994 film Pet Shop.

== Filmography ==
Year	Title	Role	Notes
1985	The Fall Guy	Riley Gordon	Episode: "The Life of Riley"
1990–1991	Life Goes On	Zoe Giordano	Episodes: "Libby's Sister" & "Head Over Heels"
1993–1994	Home Improvement	Ashley	Episodes: "Feud for Thought", "The Eve of Construction" & "Too Many Cooks"
1994	The Favor	Hannah	Theatrical film; filmed in 1990
1994	Pet Shop	Dena Yeagher	Direct-to-video film
2023	Critters, Carnivores and Creatures	Dena Yeagher	
