= Maneater (miniseries) =

- DVD cover
- Written by: Suzanne Martin; Gigi Levangie
- Directed by: Timothy Busfield
- Starring: Sarah Chalke; Marla Sokoloff; Judy Greer; Philip Winchester; Gregory Harrison; María Conchita Alonso; Paul Leyden; Garcelle Beauvais-Nilon; Noureen DeWulf; Shalim Ortiz
- Theme music composer: Daniel Licht
- Country of origin: United States
- Original language: English

Production
- Cinematography: Kenneth Zunder
- Editor: Susanne Milles
- Running time: 176 minutes
- Production companies: 3 Arts Entertainment; Sony Pictures Television

Original release
- Network: Lifetime
- Release: May 30 – May 31, 2009

Maneater is a 2009 television miniseries starring Sarah Chalke. It was directed by Timothy Busfield and written by Suzanne Martin and Gigi Levangie. This miniseries aired on Lifetime on May 30, 2009 and May 31, 2009.

== Cast ==
- Sarah Chalke as Clarissa Alpert
- Marla Sokoloff as Jennifer
- Judy Greer as Gravy
- Philip Winchester as Aaron Mason
- Gregory Harrison as Teddy Alpert
- María Conchita Alonso as Alejandra Alpert
- Paul Leyden as Simon
- Garcelle Beauvais-Nilon as Suzee
- Noureen DeWulf as Polo
- Shalim Ortiz as Pablo Hernandez
- Ramsey Bergeron as Bouncer
- T.D. Ahlers as Wedding Guest
