= The Favor (1994 film) =

- Theatrical release poster
- Directed by: Donald Petrie
- Written by: Sara Parriott; Josann McGibbon
- Produced by: Lauren Shuler Donner
- Starring: Elizabeth McGovern; Harley Jane Kozak; Bill Pullman; Brad Pitt; Ken Wahl
- Cinematography: Tim Suhrstedt
- Edited by: Harry Keramidas
- Music by: Thomas Newman
- Production company: Nelson Entertainment
- Distributed by: Orion Pictures
- Release date: April 29, 1994
- Running time: 97 minutes
- Country: United States
- Language: English
- Budget: $12 million
- Box office: $3.1 million

The Favor is a 1994 American romantic comedy film directed by Donald Petrie, and written by Sara Parriott and Josann McGibbon. It stars Harley Jane Kozak, Elizabeth McGovern, Bill Pullman, Brad Pitt and Ken Wahl. The original music score was created by Thomas Newman.

== Plot ==
As their 15-year reunion approaches, a woman named Kathy Whiting cannot help but wonder what would happen if she were to reunite with her high school sweetheart, Tom Andrews, with whom she had never had sex. Kathy's best friend, Emily Embry, 30, has been seeing Elliot Fowler, an artist, 26, who insists on coming to a birthday party for Emily's goddaughter, Kathy's daughter. Bored with the kiddie party, Elliot soon wishes to leave. Realizing that Elliot is at a different stage of life, Emily reminds him that they agreed to stop dating “when it stopped being fun.”

Being married prevents Kathy from finding out what happened to Tom, so she asks the promiscuous Emily to do it for her. Kathy asks Emily to look up Tom when she goes to Denver, have sex with him, then tell Kathy what it was like.

Emily does this, but when she tells Kathy that Tom is gorgeous and a fabulous lover, Kathy becomes obsessed with her best friend's sex with “her” missed opportunity and acts like Emily has violated their friendship by doing the “favor” Kathy asked her to do. Realizing the perverseness, Kathy tries to reignite passion with her husband Peter; however, Peter lets everyday distractions keep him from being the exciting lover Kathy longs for.

At Elliot's art exhibition, Emily breaks up with him because he is too young for her and she is ready to find someone who will commit. Kathy and Emily again argue about Kathy's irrational feelings of betrayal over Tom. Furious, Emily lets Kathy believe she has broken up with Elliot because she is going to continue to see Tom and storms off. Peter sees Emily's anger toward Kathy, followed by Kathy comforting Elliot, and becomes suspicious.

Things become even more complicated when Emily learns she is pregnant; she tells Kathy that Elliot is the father but does not want Elliot to know because he would not know how to handle it. Kathy decides that Elliot should know of his impending fatherhood. Simultaneously Joe Dubin, a colleague of Peter's, convinces him that Kathy may be cheating. Secretly following Kathy, Peter and Joe see her visiting Elliot's art studio to tell him of Emily's pregnancy and are convinced Kathy is having an affair with Elliot. Kathy warns Elliot not to tell Emily that he knows she is pregnant. Going to see Kathy, Elliot convinces her that she was hasty in breaking up with him and never gave him a chance to “audition” for a deeper relationship. Later discussing Elliot's visit, Kathy lets slip to Emily that she told him about the pregnancy. Angry with Kathy's meddling—and wishing to punish her—Kathy tells Emily that Tom is actually the father. Feeling jealous, Kathy decides to tell Tom about his "impending fatherhood", but tells Peter that she will be visiting her mother.

Elliot has a show in Denver, and Kathy ends up on the same flight, telling him Emily's baby is actually Tom's. Kathy dresses up in a provocative red dress to seduce Tom. Tom finds his old flame, Kathy, attractive and they go to his cabin. In the meantime, Peter shows up at Elliot's hotel, hitting Elliot before he can explain himself. Meanwhile, Emily arrives at Tom's cabin to warn Kathy that Peter is coming to find her with Tom. Seeing how Kathy is dressed, Peter will never believe her alibi that she is there to tell Tom of Emily's pregnancy. Emily, who is wearing business clothes, changes clothes with Kathy, donning Kathy's provocative dress. Thinking he is the father of Emily's baby, Tom is insensitive and unwilling to “step up.” Elliot arrives and steps up when Emily straightens out the paternity issue. Peter asks Kathy what is really going on, and she confesses her curiosity about her old high school boyfriend. When Peter points out that they are no longer 16, Kathy confesses that she felt no longer attractive and desired, but that she loves him. Understanding Kathy's actions, Peter reassures her that he finds her attractive and they head off to the hotel together. Kathy later helps Emily plan her wedding with Elliot, while Peter is reassured things are back to normal.

== Cast ==
- Harley Jane Kozak as Kathy Whiting
- Elizabeth McGovern as Emily Embry
- Bill Pullman as Peter Whiting
- Brad Pitt as Elliot Fowler
- Ken Wahl as Tom Andrews
- Ginger Orsi as Gina
- Leigh Ann Orsi as Hannah
- Larry Miller as Joe Dubin
- Gary Powell as Fisherman
- Holland Taylor as Maggie Sand
- Kim Walker as Jill Topial
- Claire Stansfield as Miranda
- O-Lan Jones as Mrs. Moyer
- Mindy Sterling as Debbie Rollins

== Release ==
The Favor was filmed in 1990, but went into wide release in the United States and Canada on April 29, 1994, owing to Orion's bankruptcy in 1991.

=== Home media ===
The film was released on VHS on November 16, 1994 and on DVD on December 26, 2001.

== Reception ==
The film received mixed to negative reviews from critics. On the film-critics aggregate site Rotten Tomatoes, it received a 27% approval rating based on 11 reviews, with an average rating of 4.9/10. On Metacritic, the film has a 51 out of 100 based on 11 reviews, indicating “mixed or average reviews.” Audiences polled by CinemaScore gave the film an average grade of "B-" on an A+ to F scale.

== Year-end lists ==
- Honorable mention – Michael MacCambridge, Austin American-Statesman
