= Descendants 3 =

2019 Disney Channel Original Movie directed by Kenny Ortega

- Promotional poster
- Genre: Musical; Fantasy; Teen
- Written by: Josann McGibbon; Sara Parriott
- Directed by: Kenny Ortega
- Starring: Dove Cameron; Cameron Boyce; Sofia Carson; Booboo Stewart; Cheyenne Jackson; China Anne McClain; Sarah Jeffery
- Composer: David Lawrence
- Country of origin: United States
- Original language: English

Production
- Executive producers: Kenny Ortega; Josann McGibbon; Sara Parriott; Wendy Japhet
- Producer: Wendy Japhet
- Cinematography: Adam Santelli
- Editor: Don Brochu
- Running time: 108 minutes
- Production companies: Bad Angels Productions; 5678 Productions; Disney Channel Original Productions
- Budget: $15 million

Original release
- Network: Disney Channel
- Release: August 2, 2019

Related
- Descendants 2; Descendants: The Royal Wedding; Descendants: The Rise of Red

Descendants 3 is a 2019 American musical fantasy television film directed by Kenny Ortega, and written by Sara Parriott and Josann McGibbon. It is a sequel to Descendants 2 (2017), and the third installment in the Descendants franchise, while being the last film focused on Mal (Dove Cameron) and her friends. It also stars Cameron Boyce, Sofia Carson, Booboo Stewart, Cheyenne Jackson, China Anne McClain, and Sarah Jeffery.

The film premiered on Disney Channel on August 2, 2019, and in other territories worldwide starting on October 12, 2019. It was followed by an animated television special, Descendants: The Royal Wedding, released in 2021, while a fourth film focusing on new characters, Descendants: The Rise of Red, premiered in 2024.

== Plot ==
Mal, Evie, Jay, and Carlos visit the Isle of the Lost to choose four new villain kids (VKs) to take to Auradon. They pick Dizzy, granddaughter of Lady Tremaine; Celia, daughter of Dr. Facilier; and Squeaky and Squirmy, the twin sons of Mr. Smee.

The day the kids are to be picked up, Mal's boyfriend Ben, the king of Auradon, proposes to her, and she accepts. Ben's ex-girlfriend Audrey seethes with jealousy, and her grandmother Queen Leah admonishes her for failing to secure the family legacy by marrying Ben. As the older VKs return to Auradon after picking up the kids, Hades attempts to break through the Isle's barrier, but Mal stops him. Meanwhile, unable to let go of her resentment of Mal, Audrey steals the Queen's crown and Maleficent's scepter from the museum, gaining magical powers and becoming a villain. Following the theft and Hades' escape attempt, Mal suggests the best way to protect Auradon is to close the Isle's barrier permanently.

Audrey curses Mal with Maleficent's scepter and turns her into an old woman, so Mal and the other VKs go to the Isle to get Hades' Ember, the only artifact powerful enough to break the scepter's curse. Upon entering the Isle, Mal is freed of the curse (because no dark magic is allowed there) and Celia gets her into Hades' lair, but Hades thwarts their effort to steal the Ember. He is revealed to be Mal's absentee father and reluctantly gives her the Ember, warning her to avoid getting it wet, and that since she is only “half Hades”, it may not do everything for her that it does for him. While leaving the Isle, Mal and the others are intercepted by Uma, Gil, and Harry, who agree to help after Mal falsely agrees to release all the children from the Isle.

Meanwhile, in Auradon, Audrey crashes Jane's birthday party with a sleeping curse; Chad aligns himself with her, while Jane escapes into the enchanted lake. As the entire kingdom falls under Audrey's spell, she offers to reverse it if Ben will marry her. His refusal prompts Audrey to turn him into a beast, and she begins turning people to stone. Mal and Uma, vying for the leadership of the VKs, return to Auradon with their friends. Despite their conflict, they eventually work together to pursue Audrey. After finding Ben in beast form, Carlos calms him after removing a splinter from his hand, while Jane restores him to human form with the enchanted lake water.

At Evie's house, Mal and Uma make amends while Evie wakes Doug with true love's kiss. Audrey traps them in the house, but they are able to reverse Audrey's spell by combining their magic, and they and their other friends reunite. The group track Audrey to the Fairy Cottage, but find only a shell-shocked Chad. When Mal admits her plan to seal off the Isle permanently, the group breaks apart, and Celia, learning she can never see her father again, drops the Ember in water. After Evie confronts Mal for lying to her and their friends, Ben, Carlos, Evie and Jay are all suddenly turned to stone.

Audrey takes Celia hostage and attacks Mal, who turns into her dragon form. Realizing she is Mal's only hope, Uma comes back and combines their magic to reignite the Ember. Mal defeats Audrey, who falls into a deep coma, and the curses are lifted. Mal and her friends reconcile, and she convinces Hades to use the Ember to revive Audrey. Hades does so, but decries the double standard by which Audrey is immediately forgiven for her crimes as she is not considered a villain. Audrey awakens, and she, Mal and Ben make amends.

Changing her mind, Mal tells Ben that she cannot become queen of Auradon unless she can help the Isle as well. With Ben and Fairy Godmother's approval, Mal replaces the Isle's barrier with a bridge, and the people of the newly merged society celebrate. In a mid-credits scene, Mal, Evie, Jay, and Carlos travel back to the Isle to reunite with their parents.

== Cast ==
- Dove Cameron as Mal, daughter of Maleficent and Hades
- Cameron Boyce as Carlos, son of Cruella de Vil
- Sofia Carson as Evie, daughter of The Evil Queen
- Booboo Stewart as Jay, son of Jafar
- Mitchell Hope as Ben, son of Belle and Beast
- Sarah Jeffery as Princess Audrey, daughter of Aurora and Prince Phillip
- Brenna D'Amico as Jane, daughter of the Fairy Godmother
- Melanie Paxson as the Fairy Godmother, the headmistress of Auradon Prep and Jane's mother
- Thomas Doherty as Harry Hook, son of Captain Hook and ally of Uma
- Dylan Playfair as Gil, son of Gaston and ally of Uma
- Zachary Gibson as Doug, son of Dopey the Dwarf
- Jedidiah Goodacre as Chad Charming, son of Cinderella and Prince Charming
- Anna Cathcart as Dizzy Tremaine, daughter of Drizella Tremaine and granddaughter of Lady Tremaine
- Jadah Marie as Celia, the daughter of Dr. Facilier
- Dan Payne as King Beast, Queen Belle's husband and Ben's father
- Keegan Connor Tracy as Queen Belle, Beast's wife and Ben's mother
- Bobby Moynihan as the voice of Dude, Carlos' dog who gained the power of speech in Descendants 2
- Cheyenne Jackson as Hades, ruler of the underworld and Mal's father
- China Anne McClain as Uma, daughter of Ursula

Additionally, Judith Maxie reprises her role as Queen Leah, Princess Audrey's grandmother, from the first Descendants film. Christian Convery and Luke Roessler play Squeaky and Squirmy, respectively, the twin sons of Mr. Smee. Also appearing are Jamal Sims as Celia's father Dr. Facilier, Linda Ko as Dizzy's grandmother Lady Tremaine, and Faustino Di Bauda as Squeaky's and Squirmy's father Mr. Smee.

== Production ==
On February 16, 2018, Disney Channel announced the production of Descendants 3, which Disney scheduled to air in mid-2019. Descendants 3 is written and produced by Sara Parriott and Josann McGibbon, and is directed and executive produced by Kenny Ortega. Wendy Japhet is a producer on the film, with Ortega, Sara Parriott, Josann McGibbon, and Japhet also serving as executive producers. Mark Hofeling and Kara Saun return as production designer and costume designer on the sequel, respectively. In addition to playing Dr. Facilier, Jamal Sims also serves as the film's choreographer, along with Ortega who has served as choreographer for all three Descendants films.

Rehearsals and pre-recording on the film began on April 23, 2018, in Vancouver, British Columbia, Canada. Production began on May 25, 2018. On July 18, 2018, it was reported on social media that production on the film had "officially wrapped". Teen Vogue reported that Descendants 3 will be the last film in the series.

== Release ==
Promotional footage for the film was released on the film series' official YouTube channel in February 2018. In late May 2019, it was announced that the film would premiere on August 2, 2019.

A related short film, Under the Sea: A Descendants Short Story, which features Mal and Uma facing off in "an epic underwater showdown", was released on September 28, 2018.

On July 11, 2019, Disney announced it was canceling a red carpet premiere originally planned for July 22, 2019, in the wake of Cameron Boyce's death. The film's television premiere went on as scheduled, dedicated to Boyce's memory.

== Reception ==
Descendants 3 was watched by 4.59 million viewers on its August 2, 2019 premiere, with viewership increasing to 8.43 million viewers after three days of delayed viewing. On Rotten Tomatoes the film has an approval rating of 78% based on nine reviews.

=== Accolades ===
Year	Award	Category	Recipients	Results	Ref.
2020	Kids' Choice Awards	Favorite Movie Actress	Dove Cameron	Won	
2020	Billboard Music Awards	Top Soundtrack	Descendants 3	Nominated	

== Soundtrack ==
Descendants 3 (Original TV Movie Soundtrack) is the soundtrack accompanying the film of the same name. The soundtrack and lead single, "Good to Be Bad", was released on May 31, 2019, along with the pre-order of the soundtrack. The soundtrack was released on August 2, 2019. It reached number 7 on the Billboard 200 album chart, and number 1 on the Billboard Kid Albums chart. The single "Queen of Mean", reached number 49 on the Billboard Hot 100, number 57 on the Canadian Hot 100, and number 89 on the UK Singles Chart. It was the longest charting Descendants song, spending over eight consecutive weeks in the Billboard Hot 100 charts.

== Home media ==
Descendants 3 was released on DVD on August 6, 2019.

== Future ==
Sara Parriott pitched Descendants 4 to Disney Channel executives, but it never came to fruition. Descendants: The Rise of Red was instead released as the fourth installment in the Descendants franchise, focusing on a new cast of characters.
