= Alfred Dennis (actor) =

American fim and television actor

- Alfred Dennis in The Shootist 1976
- Born: Alfred Medinets; December 26, 1922; United States
- Died: August 1, 2016 (aged 93); Los Angeles, California, U.S.
- Occupation: Actor
- Years active: 1967–2013

Alfred Dennis (born Alfred Medinets; December 26, 1922 – August 1, 2016) was an American film and television actor. He was known for playing Irving in the 1979 film The Jerk and the Barber in the 1976 film The Shootist.

Born in the United States, Dennis guest-starred in numerous television programs including Knots Landing, The Monkees, Who's the Boss?, The A-Team, Monk, Perfect Strangers, Fantasy Island and The Golden Girls. He died in August 2016 in Los Angeles, California, at the age of 93.

== Filmography ==
=== Film ===
Year	Title	Role	Notes
1969	Sweet Charity	Waiter at 'Chile Hacienda'	uncredited
1969	Three's a Crowd	Rico	TV movie
1971	Gideon	Helek	TV movie
1974	Fangs	Storekeeper	
1976	The Shootist	Barber	
1977	Demon Seed	Mokri	
1979	11th Victim	Ed Little	TV movie
1979	The Jerk	Irving	
1982	Rose: The Rosemary Clooney Story	Henri	TV movie
1987	Infidelity	Uncle Vito	TV movie
1988	Lady Mobster	Barzotti	TV movie
1994	Pet Shop	Barney	
1994	Big Shot: Gun Safety and Kids	Mr. Baldoni	Short Film
1995	Pie in the Sky	Ruby's Dad	
1995	Get Shorty	Ed the Barber	
1998	The Odd Couple II	Morton	
1999	Soccer Dog: The Movie	Mr. Cobb	
2002	The Trip	George Baxter	
2002	Mr. Deeds	Old Timer	
2002	Catch Me If You Can	Ira Penner	
2003	Bruce Almighty	Old Man	

=== Television ===
Year	Title	Role	Notes
1967	Run for Your Life	Police Inspector	1 episode
1967	The Monkees	Arthur	S1:E27, "Monkee Mother"
1967	The Monkees	Dr. Corell	S1:E30, "Monkees in Manhattan"
1967	Batman	Omar Orloff	1 episode
1968	I Dream of Jeannie	Bronze Vendor	1 episode
1968	Get Smart	Montaigne	1 episode
1969	It Takes a Thief	Herman Grosse	1 episode
1970	The Bill Cosby Show	Manager	1 episode
1970	The Flying Nun	Chef/Cesar	2 episodes
1971	Nanny and the Professor	Rosario	1 episode
1972	Owen Marshall, Counselor at Law	Mario Gallino	1 episode
1972	Bridget Loves Bernie	Francois	1 episode
1973	The Magician	Joe	1 episode
1973	Kojak	Carmone	1 episode
1975	Matt Helm	Concierge	1 episode
1976	Mary Hartman, Mary Hartman	Morton Klotterman	1 episode
1977–1979	The Rockford Files	Mr. Koska/Paul Juliano Sr.	2 episodes
1977	C.P.O. Sharkey	Gino	1 episode
1978	CHiPs	Companion No. 1	1 episode
1982	Darkroom	Baker	1 episode
1982	Fantasy Island	M'sieur Andre	1 episode
1982	Tucker's Witch	Keysmith	1 episode
1982	Cagney & Lacey		3 episodes
1983	Simon & Simon	Owner	2 episodes
1983	AfterMASH	Mr. Klinger	1 episode
1983	Knots Landing	Mr. Herschelman	1 episode
1984–1988	Hunter	Uncle Dom/Print Shop Owner	2 episodes
1985	Hardcastle and McCormick		1 episode
1987	L.A. Law	Israel Hersch	1 episode
1987	The A-Team	Sal Cucino	1 episode
1989	The Golden Girls	Charley	1 episode
1989	Doctor Doctor	Salvatore Parisi	1 episode
1990–1992	Life Goes On	Miller	5 episodes
1990	Who's the Boss?	Attendant	1 episode
1991	Perfect Strangers	Gunther	1 episode
1991	Baby Talk		1 episode
1993	Room for Two	Ernesto	1 episode
1995	Murphy Brown	Mr. Schwartz	1 episode
1995	The Wayans Bros.	Sam Roth	1 episode
1996	Tracey Takes On...	Studio Gate Guard	1 episode
1998	You're the One	Poppy	1 episode
1998	Suddenly Susan	Rabbi Stern	1 episode
1998	Caroline in the City	Sid	1 episode
1999	Party of Five	Mr. Kranther	1 episode
1999	Veronica's Closet	Doorman	1 episode
1999	Action	Schlomo	1 episode
1999	Ladies Man	Hasidic Jew	1 episode
2001	Touched by an Angel	Saul	1 episode
2001	The Parkers	Aldo	1 episode
2002	The Court	Justice Bernstein	4 episodes
2003	Monk	Old Man	1 episode
2004	Grounded for Life	Manny	1 episode
2004	Judging Amy	Milo Corwin	1 episode
2005	Girlfriends	Driver	2 episodes
2005	Entourage	Old Man	1 episode
2005	Gilmore Girls	Town Elder/Mr. Fink	2 episodes
2005	Reba	Old Jake	1 episode
2010	Party Down	Sid Sidleman	1 episode
2010	Community	Richard	1 episode
2011	Retired at 35	Mr. Lutz	1 episode
2012	Raising Hope	Old Person #2/Ned	2 episodes
2013	Save Me	Old Man	1 episode
