= The Starter Wife (miniseries) =

- Created by: Gigi Levangie
- Based on: The Starter Wife by Gigi Levangie
- Written by: Josann McGibbon; Sara Parriott
- Directed by: Jon Avnet
- Starring: Debra Messing; Judy Davis; Miranda Otto; Chris Diamantopoulos; Peter Jacobson; Stephen Moyer; Joe Mantegna; Anika Noni Rose
- Composer: Edward Shearmur
- Country of origin: United States
- Original language: English
- No. of seasons: 1
- No. of episodes: 6

Production
- Executive producers: Jon Avnet; Stephanie Davis; Howard Klein; Gigi Levangie; Josann McGibbon; Sara Parriott
- Producer: Marsha Oglesby
- Running time: 43 minutes
- Production companies: Haypop Productions; 3 Arts Entertainment; McGibbon-Parriott Productions; NBC Universal Television Studio

Original release
- Network: USA Network
- Release: May 31 – June 28, 2007

The Starter Wife is a 2007 USA Network television miniseries, based on the 2006 novel of the same name by Gigi Levangie. Its title is derived from the concept of a starter marriage. Filmed over four months in Queensland, Australia, the plot focuses on Molly Kagan (Debra Messing) who, after years of marriage to a Hollywood film mogul, is forced to redefine herself and her role in society when her husband leaves her for a younger woman.

The mini-series premiered with a two-hour presentation on May 31, 2007, at 9:00 pm ET. The premiere attracted 5.4 million viewers, with 2.8 million of them being adults aged 25–54 (the network's target demographic). Ratings steadily decreased as the series progressed. The series is available for purchase on iTunes (to American customers only) and was available for DVD purchase starting September 11, 2007.

The miniseries was nominated for ten Emmy Awards, including Outstanding Miniseries, Lead Actress in a Miniseries or a Movie (Debra Messing), Supporting Actor in a Miniseries or a Movie (Joe Mantegna), Supporting Actress in a Miniseries or a Movie (Judy Davis), and Writing for a Miniseries, Movie, or Dramatic Special (Josann McGibbon & Sara Parriott). Davis was the sole winner, while Messing was also nominated for a Golden Globe Award and Screen Actors Guild Award for Outstanding Actress in a Miniseries or TV Movie.

Although initially intended as a one-shot miniseries, USA subsequently ordered The Starter Wife as a new series for the 2008 spring season. Production on the series first ten-episode season was delayed due to the 2007–2008 Writers Guild of America strike, and began airing October 10, 2008.

== Characters ==
=== Main ===
- Molly Kagan (Debra Messing) is a 41-year-old wife and mother of five-year-old daughter Jaden (Miniseries: Bethany Whitmore; Series: Brielle Barbusca). Soon after the characters are introduced, she is abandoned by her husband and is forced to rebuild her life and assert herself within the film community, most of which ignores her after the split.
- Joan McAllister (Judy Davis) is Molly's oldest friend and an alcoholic socialite who lends Molly her beachfront Malibu home when she pretends to jet off to Paris but actually enters a rehab center in Ojai. She later calls upon Molly to impersonate her non-existent sister "Bambi", upon whom she has placed all blame for her failings, when her therapist insists the two confront each other and work out their hostilities.
- Cricket Stewart (Miranda Otto) is one of Molly's friends whose allegiance to her is tested when her film director husband, a business associate of Kenny's, demands she break all ties with her. When she discovers him in a compromising situation with their children's nanny, she orders him to leave the house and reconnects with Molly. She later takes him back but has difficulty forgetting the image of her husband with the nanny. After she discovers she is pregnant she tells Molly that she has finally found the image to replace the one of her husband cheating.
- Rodney Evans (Chris Diamantopoulos), one of Molly's best friends, is a gay interior decorator suffering a financial setback.
- Kenny Kagan (Peter Jacobson) is Molly's soon-to-be ex-husband and President of Production at Durango Pictures. He leaves Molly for a woman half his age and aims to replace the current CEO of the company.
- Sam Knight (Stephen Moyer) is a homeless beach bum who saves Molly from drowning. He openly scorns her as superficial but the two eventually become involved in a romantic relationship. It is later revealed he spent five years in prison for involuntary manslaughter after his best friend was killed in a car crash caused by Sam's DUI.
- Lou Manahan (Joe Mantegna) is the head of Durango Pictures. He fakes his suicide by drowning to start anew, yet cannot help but attend his memorial service (disguised as a woman) to see how his friends and colleagues react to his death.
- Lavender (Anika Noni Rose) is the security guard at the entrance to the gated community where Joan lives. Molly takes her and her grandmother under her wing when they are evicted from their apartment for having a dog.

=== Recurring ===
- Shoshanna (Trilby Glover) is a young pop music singer who becomes involved with Kenny. It is revealed she was only using him to advance her career and she dumps him when he is fired from his job.
- Detective Parkes – John Atkinson

== Nielsen Ratings by episode ==
Episode #	Title	Air Date	Rating	25–54	Viewers	Cable Rank
1 & 2	"Premiere"	May 31, 2007	3.7	2.8	5.39	#5
3	"Hour 3"	June 7, 2007	2.7	?	3.92	#7
4	"Hour 4"	June 14, 2007	2.5	?	3.55	#9
5	"Hour 5"	June 21, 2007	2.2	?	3.15	#22
6	"Finale"	June 28, 2007	1.7	?	2.82	#29

== International broadcasting ==
Country	TV Network(s)	Series Premiere	Weekly Schedule
United States	USA Network	May 31, 2007	
Canada	A-Channel	September 10, 2007	Mondays at 9:00 pm
Australia	Network Ten	December 5, 2007	Wednesdays at 8:30 pm
Thailand	Hallmark Channel	October 21, 2007	Sundays at 8:00 pm
Malaysia	Hallmark Channel	October 21, 2007	Sundays at 9.00 pm
Singapore	Hallmark Channel	October 21, 2007	Sundays at 9.00 pm
Hong Kong	Hallmark Channel	October 21, 2007	Sundays at 9.00 pm
Philippines	Hallmark Channel	October 21, 2007	Sundays at 9.00 pm
Portugal	MOV	December 2007	
Portugal	TVI	November 2009	Thursdays at approximately 00:15 am
Brazil	Rede Telecine / People+Arts	October 2007	
United Kingdom	Sky Movies Drama	December 10, 2007	Mondays at 9:40 pm
Turkey	CNBC-e	September 18, 2008	Thursdays at 9:00 pm
Sweden	Kanal 5	March 11, 2008	Tuesday at 9:00 pm
Germany	Premiere	February 19, 2008	Tuesdays at 8:15 pm
Croatia	Nova TV	announced	TBA
France	Canal+	August 7, 2008	Thursdays at 8:50 pm (2 episodes)
Spain	Cosmopolitan TV (cable)	February 2, 2009	
Spain	TVE 2	July 2009	
Italy	Mya	September 4, 2008	Thursdays at 9:00 pm
Switzerland	SF zwei	November 17, 2008	Monday at 8.00 pm
Hungary	TV2	May 26, 2009	Friday at 10.15 pm
Japan	Star Channel(CS)	October 2008	
The Middle East	Showseries Showtime Arabia		
Netherlands	RTL 8	January 3, 2010	Sundays at 8.00 pm
(Republic of Ireland) Ireland	TG4		
Belgium	La Une	June 2010	Thursdays at 10:00 pm (2 episodes)
Serbia	Fox Life		

== Awards and nominations ==
Year	Award	Category	Nominee(s)	Result	Ref.
2007	Artios Awards	Outstanding Achievement in Casting – Television Mini Series	Mary Jo Slater, Steve Brooksbank, and Tom McSweeney	Won	
2007	Online Film & Television Association Awards	Best Miniseries		Nominated	
2007	Online Film & Television Association Awards	Best Actress in a Motion Picture or Miniseries	Debra Messing	Nominated	
2007	Online Film & Television Association Awards	Best Supporting Actor in a Motion Picture or Miniseries	Joe Mantegna	Nominated	
2007	Online Film & Television Association Awards	Best Costume Design in a Motion Picture or Miniseries		Nominated	
2007	Primetime Emmy Awards	Outstanding Miniseries	Josann McGibbon, Sara Parriott, Jon Avnet, Stephanie Davis, Howard Klein, Gigi Levangie Grazer, Jeff Hayes, and Marsha Oglesby	Nominated	
2007	Primetime Emmy Awards	Outstanding Lead Actress in a Miniseries or a Movie	Debra Messing	Nominated	
2007	Primetime Emmy Awards	Outstanding Supporting Actor in a Miniseries or a Movie	Joe Mantegna	Nominated	
2007	Primetime Emmy Awards	Outstanding Supporting Actress in a Miniseries or a Movie	Judy Davis	Won	
2007	Primetime Emmy Awards	Outstanding Writing for a Miniseries, Movie or a Dramatic Special	Josann McGibbon and Sara Parriott	Nominated	
2007	Primetime Creative Arts Emmy Awards	Outstanding Art Direction for a Miniseries or Movie	Tracey Gallacher, Brian Edmonds, and Rolland Pike	Nominated	
2007	Primetime Creative Arts Emmy Awards	Outstanding Casting for a Miniseries, Movie or a Special	Mary Jo Slater, Steven Brooksbank, and Tom McSweeney	Nominated	
2007	Primetime Creative Arts Emmy Awards	Outstanding Costumes for a Miniseries, Movie or a Special	Marion Boyce, Debra McGuire, and Vanessa Loh (for "Part 1")	Nominated	
2007	Primetime Creative Arts Emmy Awards	Outstanding Makeup for a Miniseries, Movie or a Special (Non-Prosthetic)	Viv Mepham and Deborah Lanser	Nominated	
2007	Primetime Creative Arts Emmy Awards	Outstanding Single-Camera Picture Editing for a Miniseries or a Movie	Robert Florio (for "Part 3")	Nominated	
2007	Satellite Awards	Best Miniseries		Nominated	
2007	Satellite Awards	Best Actress in a Miniseries or Motion Picture Made for Television	Debra Messing	Nominated	
2007	Satellite Awards	Best Actress in a Supporting Role in a Series, Miniseries or Motion Picture Made for Television	Judy Davis	Nominated	
2008	Art Directors Guild Awards	Excellence in Production Design Award – Television Movie or Mini-series	Tracey Gallacher, Brian Edmonds, and Michelle McGahey	Nominated	
2008	Australian Film Institute Awards	Best Actress	Judy Davis	Nominated	
2008	Costume Designers Guild Awards	Outstanding Made for Television Movie or Miniseries	Debra McGuire and Marion Boyce	Nominated	
2008	Directors Guild of America Awards	Outstanding Directorial Achievement in Movies for Television or Miniseries	Jon Avnet	Nominated	
2008	Golden Globe Awards	Best Actress – Miniseries or Television Film	Debra Messing	Nominated	
2008	Gracie Awards	Outstanding Female Lead – Mini-Series	Debra Messing	Won	
2008	Gracie Awards	Outstanding Supporting Actress – Mini-Series	Judy Davis	Won	
2008	NAACP Image Awards	Outstanding Actress in a Television Movie, Mini-Series or Dramatic Special	Anika Noni Rose	Nominated	
2008	Producers Guild of America Awards	David L. Wolper Award for Outstanding Producer of Long-Form Television	Jon Avnet, Josann McGibbon, Marsha Oglesby, and Sara Parriott	Nominated	
2008	Screen Actors Guild Awards	Outstanding Performance by a Female Actor in a Miniseries or Television Movie	Debra Messing	Nominated	
2008	Writers Guild of America Awards	Long Form – Adaptation	Sara Parriott and Josann McGibbon; Based on the book by Gigi Levangie Grazer	Nominated	
