= Josann McGibbon =

American screenwriter

Josann McGibbon is an American screenwriter who previously teamed with Sara Parriott in one of the longest writing partnerships in Hollywood; they were a team for 33 years from 1986 to 2019.

== Biography ==
The team's first major success as screenwriters was the early Brad Pitt film, The Favor. Their biggest hits since then include Three Men and a Little Lady and Runaway Bride. In 2007, McGibbon and Parriott co-wrote and produced the hit Debra Messing miniseries, The Starter Wife. The Starter Wife received 10 Emmy nominations in 2007, including one for best screenwriting, and they won an Emmy Award. It was also nominated for Golden Globe and Writers Guild awards, and was then produced as a series, also on USA Network. McGibbon and Parriott wrote and co-produced the Disney Channel movie, Descendants which was directed by Kenny Ortega and premiered in July, 2015. In February, 2016, it won the Writers Guild of America Award in television for Outstanding Children's Long Form. They then wrote and executive-produced Descendants 2, also directed by Kenny Ortega, which was simulcast in July, 2017, on the Disney Channel, ABC, and the other cable channels owned by Disney-ABC, with viewership reaching 21 million viewers. They wrote and executive-produced Descendants 3, which premiered on August 2, 2019. After Parriott retired in 2019, McGibbon has continued to write, and her movie Choose Love is the first interactive romantic comedy being produced by Netflix.

McGibbon won several days on $25,000 Pyramid in July–August 1985, winning over $10K and a trip to the Caribbean. She played one of her episodes against pre-fame Kathy Najimy, who lost on her appearance and later played the Evil Queen in Descendants.

McGibbon & Parriott have been featured in interviews in IndieWire and FSM Media, among others.
