= Pet Shop (film) =

- Home video release poster
- Directed by: Hope Perello
- Written by: Brent V. Friedman; Mark Goldstein; Greg Suddeth
- Produced by: Albert Band; Charles Band; Debra Dion; Pete von Sholly
- Starring: Terry Kiser; Marcella Avila; Joanne Baron; Cody Burger; Alfred Dennis; Leigh Ann Orsi
- Cinematography: Karen Grossman
- Edited by: Lauren A. Schaffer
- Music by: Reg Powell
- Distributed by: Moonbeam Entertainment
- Release date: December 23, 1994
- Running time: 88 min.
- Country: United States
- Language: English

Pet Shop is a 1994 science fantasy children's film by Moonbeam Entertainment. The film's plot involves an alien couple that comes to Earth in disguise.

== Plot ==
Evening falls over the city of Cactus Flats, Arizona, and in it a young boy named Mike Powers rides his bike along the town's strip mall. What looks to be shooting star streams across the sky, and Mike stops to chat with Barney the pet shop owner who asks him what he wished for, to which Mike responds with a pet turtle. As Mike rides off, Barney quips that he wishes only to retire. As he is locking up for the evening, the shop’s dogs begin to bark and act up. In the sky, a pink blob of light descends over the pet shop and as it does, the backroom begins to glow. Barney opens the door to find a man and woman both dressed in cowboyish attire and very large gallon hats, making odd, raspy noises to each other in some unknown speech. The couple offers Barney a suitcase filled with stacks of hundred-dollar bills in exchange for his store. He wordlessly and happily agrees.

A family of four known as the Yeagher’s (Joe and Marilyn, and their children Charlie and Dena) are moving to town as a consequence of being in the witness protection program, being relocated from Brooklyn, New York and assuming new identities as the Vincenza’s. Their caseworker, Marshall Dave, posing as an uncle informs them that they must refrain from outside contact and ensure to use their new names to avoid issues with Tony Marino, an imprisoned criminal who Joe “ratted” out. At the prison, Marino consorts with his “boys” (Babe and Curly) discussing "rats" that must be exterminated before his release, or else be exterminated themselves. Back at the Yeagher’s home, “Vickie” expresses how she misses their family dog Rocko.

Meanwhile, back at the pet shop, it is revealed that the new owners of the establishment, (Mr. and Mrs. Zimm) have transformed the backroom of the shop into a spaceship-esque room filled with advanced alien devices and an array of alien creatures, who possess a higher intelligence above earth animals as they respond to the Zimm’s commands and form an orderly line. The Zimm's threaten the creatures and tell them they must transform into more earthly forms to avoid unwanted detection by the townsfolk, and then administer their special vitamins to them.

At the grand re-opening of the new pet shop, Mike and his friend Nicky are perusing the store, wondering where Barney may have gone. He spots a turtle that he wants but is upset that he has no money to purchase it, while a security camera from above focuses on the boys. Mr. Zimm informs Nicky the escaped alien is not for sale but then changes his mind as Nicky pressures him and tells him to come afterhours for free pets.

The children all inevitably return to the store and sign papers to assume responsibility for the free pets. It is revealed that the Zimm's are using cameras and equipment throughout the store to ascertain the value of human children on the alien pet market. Meanwhile, Marino's thugs make their way by car towards Cactus Flats to eradicate the Yeagher’s.

As Dena is playing fetch with Gizel, he changes into his alien form, and similar scenarios take place across the different children's households. Mike visits Dena and tells her that these animals don’t exist in the encyclopedia and suggests the children all gather to try and find out why the Zimm's gave away all the pets for free.

The Zimm's activate a transport device as they brag amongst themselves about how they have duped the children since they did not give them any vitamins for the pets and how they will all have to return, and then be sold to pay their bills. The kids gather at Mike's house, Dena included by convincing Charlie that Mike’s older sister Gwen was available and attractive. To his dismay, she is heavier than her old photo implied. As he is preoccupied with Gwen, the kids notice that all of the pets seem to be sick and tired. The kids, supposing that the creatures may just be hungry, make a mess and disaster of Mike's kitchen constructing various meals for them. The creatures seem revitalized for a while but soon return to their prior state. Dena examines the contract closer and sees that there is a clause stating they can bring the pets back to be "fixed up" if they get sick.

Their car having run out of gas, Babe and Curly push it through the heat into town. At the coffee shop, Joe receives a call from his wife that all the kids are missing, having gone into the pet shop.

The kids return to the Zimm's with the pets and administer them vitamins but also explain that "According to the interstellar rules of commerce, we can only take as many pets as we leave behind. Four critters for four humans." The kids frantically try to escape and the creatures now revitalized assist by comically tripping up the Zimm's time and again. In the process, Mr. Zimm's hat is knocked off his head, revealing a bulbous forehead with a third eye, and gives them "the business," zapping each of the children with colored beams of light which paralyzes them. The Zimm’s then proceed to cage them all up and gleefully celebrate exclaiming that the alien pets will all be dead without their vitamins, so they are no concern.

As they proceed to transport the children, Joe interrupts and the Zimm's ignorantly leave the backroom open, allowing the creatures to escape. Babe and Curly spot him entering the shop and decide to enter from the back to avoid detection. The Zimm's insist the children aren't there, but Joe catches sight of Dena's baseball and demands to know what they've done. Mr. Zimm tries to stun him with his eyebeam, but Joe ducks and instead freezes Mrs. Zimm in place.

In the backroom, Alexus tells Pwing to get the keys but is unable to reach through the bars to turn the key, however Trimble stretches the metal bars apart to allow her to reach through. Gizel runs back to the house and causes Mrs. Yeagher to faint by transforming in front of her. Once freed, Alexis frees the other children, and they use the alien machinery to block both doors and keep both the Zimm's and Marino's boys at bay. Joe, still feeling the effects of the "Zimmer" beam, smashes his head through the glass of the store to give Dave and the others access since the door is locked. Mr. Zimm manages to push through the door as the Marino brothers do simultaneously and come to a standoff. Mr. Zimm pleads that they take anyone but Dena as she is the most valuable, but his hat is stuck, and the Marino's take Dena into their custody at knifepoint. The kids in consort with the pets free Dena and somehow manage to activate the teleporter, transporting the brothers away.

The adults manage to open the door and bump into Mrs. Zimm, seemingly starting her awake as the two aliens confide to one another that the adults are worth less, but at least their bills are paid. Then, the duo step onto the transporter platform and dance as the room begins to glow, causing the room in which the entire party is standing to fold in on itself out of existence, and retransforms into the prior backroom. The Zimm’s transform as well back into the pink blob and shoot out of the room. Mike and Alexis remain behind as the others leave and find both Pwing and Trimble still left behind. Outside, the town is gathered as they watch the pink blob ascend. Charlie pulls up in the family car, with a lipstick mark on his cheek, pursued by Gwen on a motorcycle demanding he come back.

Reunited with their pets, everyone departs and returns to their homes. Dena praises her father as a hero, and Marshall Dave assures the Yeagher's should now be safe from Marino. Gizel rolls in the mud to Dena's dismay and then begins eating it. Gizel speaks garbled to her and she deduces that he must be saying that the mud tastes like their vitamins, implying the alien pets will be fine after all.

== Cast ==
- Terry Kiser as Joe Yeagher
- Leigh Ann Orsi as Dena Yeagher
- Spencer Vrooman as Mike
- Joanne Baron as Marilyn Yeagher
- David Wagner as Charlie Yeagher
- Jane Morris as Mrs. Zimm
- Jeff Michalski as Mr. Zimm
- Shashawnee Hall as Marshall Dave
- Sabrina Wiener as Alexis
- Cody Burger as Nicky
- Leonardo Vincent Surdo as "Curly"
- Nino Surdo as "Babe"
- John LaMotta as Tony Marino
- Alfred Dennis as Barney
- Marcella Avila as Gwen
- Mark Goldstein as A Proprietor
- Taylor Donlan as Nicky’s Mother
- Traci Link as A Teenage Girl
- Marykate Cunningham as A Customer

== Release ==
Originally intended for a release in the summer of 1994, the film ended up being released on videocassette on March 28, 1995, though it did get released on video in Australia in December 1994. Full Moon released a new remastered Blu-Ray on December 11, 2018.
