= Sarah Jeffery =

Canadian actress (born 1996)

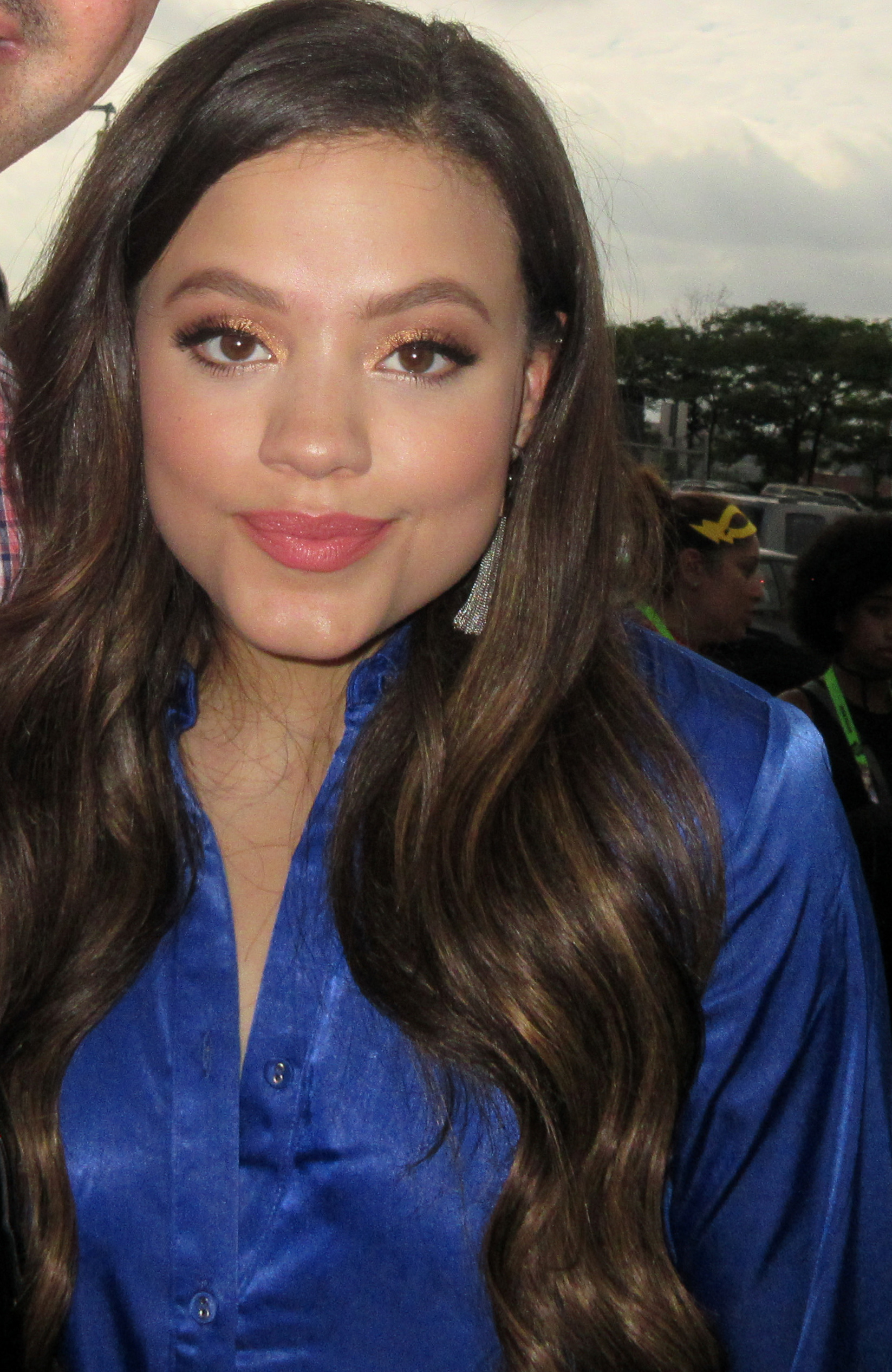
- Jeffery in 2018
- Born: Sarah Marie Jeffery; April 3, 1996 (age 30); Vancouver, Canada
- Occupations: Actress; singer
- Years active: 2013–present
- Notable credit(s): Evie Travis in Rogue; Cristina Santos in Shades of Blue; Maggie Vera in Charmed; Princess Audrey in Descendants

Sarah Marie Jeffery (born April 3, 1996) is a Canadian actress and singer. She is known for portraying Maggie Vera, one of the lead characters on The CW's reboot series Charmed (2018–2022), or her previous work as Audrey, daughter of Sleeping Beauty, in the Disney Channel's Descendants franchise.

== Early life ==
Sarah Jeffery was born in Vancouver, British Columbia.

== Career ==
Jeffery's first major acting role was in the Cartoon Network television film Aliens in the House. Shortly after, she landed a lead role in the DirecTV original series Rogue, working opposite Thandiwe Newton, playing the role of her daughter, Evie Travis. She subsequently joined the cast of Fox's sci-fi drama series Wayward Pines playing the recurring role of Amy, opposite Matt Dillon and Carla Gugino.

In 2015, Jeffery played the role of Princess Audrey, daughter of Princess Aurora, in the Disney Channel Original Movie, Descendants. She followed this up by playing the role of Audrey in the animated spinoff to the film Descendants: Wicked World. In 2019, she reprised her role as Audrey in the third installment of the franchise, Descendants 3.

In January 2016, she began a lead role in Adi Hasak's American police procedural crime series Shades of Blue, playing Cristina Santos, the daughter of Jennifer Lopez's character; the series was renewed for a second season. The same year Jeffery starred in the comedy film Be Somebody with Matthew Espinosa.

In February 2018, Jeffery was cast in the lead role of Maggie Vera in The CW's fantasy drama series Charmed, a reboot of the 1998 series of the same name. The reboot "centers on three sisters in a college town who discover they are witches."

In 2020, she and other television stars contributed their voices to the brief public service announcement about ending live-shackle slaughter of chickens for Mercy for Animals. She would again provide voiceover for Mercy for Animals for 2024's Voices of Hope ~ Words of Wisdom by Dr. Jane Goodall.

== Personal life ==
In December 2019, Jeffery revealed through Instagram that she struggles with obsessive–compulsive disorder.

== Filmography ==
=== Film ===
Year	Title	Role	Notes
2015	Across the Line	Jayme Crawley	
2016	Be Somebody	Emily Lowe	
2018	Daphne & Velma	Daphne Blake	Direct-to-video film
2019	Audrey's Royal Return: A Descendants Short Story	Audrey	Short film
2022	Dead End	Bella	Short film
2023	Year of the Fox	Ivy Reid	
2024	The Six Triple Eight	Dolores Washington	
2025	F*ckUps Anonymous	Lauren	Short film
TBA	Tecie †	Devon	Post-production
TBA	Nutmeg & Mistletoe †	Nutmeg	Post-production

=== Television ===
Year	Title	Role	Notes
2013	Aliens in the House	Katie	Episode: "Pilot"
2013–2016	Rogue	Evie Travis	Main cast (season 1–3)
2015	Wayward Pines	Amy Breslow	Recurring role (season 1)
2015	Descendants: School of Secrets	Audrey	Main role
2015	Descendants	Audrey	Television film
2015–2017	Descendants: Wicked World	Audrey (voice)	Main role
2016–2018	Shades of Blue	Cristina Santos	Main role (season 1–3)
2018	The X-Files	Brianna Stapleton	2 episodes
2018–2022	Charmed	Maggie Vera	Main role
2019	Descendants 3	Audrey	Television film
2019–2021	Robot Chicken	Prinzessin / Kiki / Old Woman (voices)	Episode: "Boogie Bardstown in: No Need, I Have Coupons"
2021	Descendants: The Royal Wedding	Audrey (voice)	Television special
2023	Chibiverse	Audrey (voice)	Episode: "Chibi Villains Unite"
2023–2026	Lego Dreamzzz	Zoey (voice)	Main role

== Discography ==
=== Soundtrack albums ===
Title	Album details	Peak chart positions									Certifications
Title	Album details	US	US OST	AUS	BEL	FRA	GER	ITA	NL	SPA	Certifications
Descendants	Released: July 31, 2015; Formats: CD, digital download; Label: Walt Disney	1	1	57	178	102	50	19	50	36	RIAA: Gold
Descendants 3	Released: August 2, 2019; Formats: Digital download; Label: Walt Disney	7	1	36	110	—	—	—	—	—	
"—" denotes releases that did not chart or were not released in that territory.

=== Singles ===
Title	Year	Peak chart positions				Certifications	Album
Title	Year	CAN	IRE	UK	US	Certifications	Album
"Queen of Mean"	2019	57	83	89	49	RIAA: Platinum; BPI: Silver	Descendants 3
"Even the Stars"	2020	—	—	—	—		Non-album single
"Suffer"	2021	—	—	—	—		Non-album single

=== Other charted songs ===
Title	Year	Peak chart positions	Album
Title	Year	US	Album
"Set It Off" (with Dove Cameron, Sofia Carson, Cameron Boyce, Booboo Stewart, Mitchell Hope, and Jeff Lewis)	2015	— (Note: "Set It Off" did not enter the Billboard Hot 100, but peaked at number 6 on the Bubbling Under Hot 100 Singles chart.)	Descendants
"—" denotes releases that did not chart or were not released in that territory.

== Accolades ==
Year	Association	Category	Work	Result	Ref.
2015	Leo Awards	Best Supporting Performance by a Female in a Dramatic Series	Rogue – "Coup de Grace"	Nominated	
