= Life Goes On (TV series) =

American drama television series

- The cast of Life Goes On. Clockwise from left: Kellie Martin, Patti LuPone, Bill Smitrovich, Chris Burke, and Arnold the Semi-Wonder Dog.
- Created by: Michael Braverman
- Starring: Bill Smitrovich; Patti LuPone; Monique Lanier; Chris Burke; Kellie Martin; Tracey Needham
- Theme music composer: Lennon–McCartney
- Opening theme: "Ob-La-Di, Ob-La-Da"; Performed by Patti LuPone and the cast of Life Goes On
- Country of origin: United States
- Original language: English
- No. of seasons: 4
- No. of episodes: 83

Production
- Running time: approximately 40 minutes
- Production companies: Toots Productions; Warner Bros. Television

Original release
- Network: ABC
- Release: September 12, 1989 – May 23, 1993

Life Goes On is an American comedy drama television series broadcast on ABC from September 12, 1989, to May 23, 1993. The show centers on the Thatcher family living in suburban Chicago: Drew, his wife Libby, and their children Paige, Rebecca and Charles, who is known as Corky. Life Goes On was the first television series to feature a major character with Down syndrome.

== Cast and characters ==
=== Main ===
- Bill Smitrovich as Andrew "Drew" Thatcher:

Drew is the husband of Libby Thatcher and the father of Paige, Corky, and Becca Thatcher. He is a Special Olympics coach who formerly worked for a construction company before going into the restaurant business.

- Patti LuPone as Elizabeth "Libby" Thatcher:

Drew's wife, Paige's stepmother, and Corky and Becca's mother, who has been a singer and actress. She is very supportive of Corky and proud that Corky and Becca take part in their church's drama group and that Becca is in her school's drama club. At the end of Season 2, she gives birth to her and Drew's fourth child, a son named Nicholas.

- Monique Lanier (season 1); Tracey Needham (seasons 2-4), as Paige Thatcher:

Drew's daughter, Libby's stepdaughter, and Corky and Becca's older half-sister. Paige frequently dates men of whom her father does not approve. She is very caring of Corky but has a love-hate relationship with Becca.

- Chris Burke as Charles "Corky" Thatcher:

Corky is the middle child: younger brother of Paige and older brother of Becca. Despite having Down syndrome, he takes mostly regular classes in high school. He occasionally struggles, and indicated that mathematics was his hardest subject, but he improves through tutoring sessions.

- Kellie Martin as Rebecca "Becca" Thatcher:

Becca is the younger sister of Corky and Paige. She is nerdy but attractive; at school, she is socially awkward, especially around her crushes, such as Tyler and Jesse.

- Tommy Puett (recurring, season 1; main, seasons 2-3) as Tyler Benchfield: Corky's best friend and Becca's first boyfriend. He dies from drinking and driving in his last appearance.
- Chad Lowe (recurring, season 3; main, season 4) as Jesse McKenna: Becca's second boyfriend.

=== Recurring ===
- Ray Buktenica (guest, season 1; recurring, seasons 2-3) as Jerry Berkson, Libby's boss at Berkson & Berkson, an advertising agency. Jerry is eccentric and somewhat egomaniacal; he never fails to show his temper, but Libby always stands up to him. Jerry later becomes a partner in Drew's restaurant, The Glen Brook Grill.
- Tanya Fenmore (seasons 1-3) as Maxie, Becca's best friend. Maxie leaves early in season 3 for a study-abroad in Paris and is never seen again.
- Michele Matheson (seasons 1-2) as Rona Lieberman, a popular girl at school who is Becca's rival and a love interest for Tyler.
- David Byrd (guest, season 1; recurring, seasons 2-4) as Hans, a chef who works at the Glen Brook Grill. He is a German immigrant.
- Mary Page Keller (season 2) as Gina Giordano, Libby's sister, who comes to live in the Thatcher household for a time.
- Leigh Ann Orsi (season 2) as Zoe, Gina's daughter, who comes to live in the Thatcher household for a time.
- Troy Evans (seasons 3-4) as Artie McDonald, a welding foreman and Paige's boss at Stollmark Industries. In season 4, Artie and Paige are laid off from the Stollmark factory and they launch a contracting business together, "Darlin' Construction" that he bought and named for his nickname he had given her.
- Lance Guest (seasons 3-4) as Michael Romanov, a welder and artist. He is Paige's co-worker at Stollmark Industries and becomes her love interest.
- Andrea Friedman (seasons 3-4) as Amanda Swanson, Corky's girlfriend, a college student. Like Corky, Amanda also has Down Syndrome. Early in season 4, Corky and Amanda elope, which comes as a shock to their families.
- Kiersten Warren (season 4) as Kathy Goodman, Becca's friend and co-worker at a bookstore. She is usually referred to by her last name only. A recent high school dropout, Goodman is convinced by Becca to enroll at Marshall High, which she does during their senior year, after having quit a previous school.

=== Guest stars ===
- Al Ruscio as Sal Giordano, Libby's father
- Penny Santon as Teresa Giordano, Libby's mother
- Gloria Gifford as Mrs. Kneffer, principal of Marshall High
- Gina Hecht as Angela, Libby's cousin, an attorney
- Rick Rosenthal as Richard Thatcher, Drew's brother
- Peter Van Norden (seasons 1-3) as Coach Paintz Kutner, a former classmate of Drew's
- Alan Blumenfeld (seasons 1-3) as John Khatchadourian, a former classmate of Drew's
- Whip Hubley as Dr. Oliver Matthews (season 1), the veterinarian that Paige works for, and as Coach Eric Bradford (season 2), a gymnastics coach at Marshall High.
- Michael Rankin as Donnie Benchfield, Tyler's younger brother who has Down Syndrome.
- Michael Alldredge as Mr. Seedling
- Alfred Dennis as Miller
- Shannen Doherty (season 1) as Ginny Green, a new student in school whom Corky has a crush on
- Adam Carl (season 1-2) as Matt Hardy, a friend of Becca's whom she briefly dates
- Viveca Lindfors (season 1) as Mrs. Doubcha, Becca's dance instructor
- Elyssa Davalos (season 2) as Doreen Gillespie, a waitress at the Glen Brook Grill
- Barney Martin (seasons 3-4) as Stan Baker, owner of the movie theater where Corky works
- Mitzi McCall (season 3) as Midge, a waitress at the Glen Brook Grill
- Dorothy Lyman (seasons 3-4) as Mary McKenna, Jesse's mother
- Steven Eckholdt (season 3) as Kenny Stollmark Jr., son of the Stollmark Industries president. He becomes romantically involved with Paige and they nearly get married.
- Drew Snyder (seasons 3-4) as Bill Swanson, Amanda's father
- Charlotte Stewart (seasons 3-4) as Collette Swanson, Amanda's mother
- Ned Vaughn (season 4) as Eric, manager of the bookstore where Becca works. He has romantic feelings for Becca.
- Martin Milner (season 4) as Harris Cassidy, owner of the bookstore where Becca works
- Michael Goorjian (season 4) as Ray Nelson, a classmate of Becca's
- Christopher and Kevin Graves (season 4) as Nicholas Thatcher
- Richard Frank (season 4) as Chester, a patient that Jesse meets while being hospitalized for the effects of AIDS

== Overview ==
The drama featured the Thatcher family, whose son, Charles "Corky" Thatcher (played by Chris Burke), has Down syndrome, while their daughter Becca (played by Kellie Martin) did well at school but was socially awkward. Patti LuPone, then best known for theatrical roles, played the mother Elizabeth ("Libby") and Bill Smitrovich played the father Drew. Eldest sister Paige Thatcher was played by Monique Lanier during the 1989–1990 season and by Tracey Needham during the 1990–1993 seasons as Lanier left the series to have a child. Becca's boyfriend and Corky's buddy, Tyler Benchfield, was played by Tommy Puett. Jerry Berkson (Ray Buktenica) was Libby's quirky boss. In the last two seasons, Becca's boyfriend Jesse McKenna was played by Chad Lowe.

The show is set in the Chicago suburb Glenbrook, Illinois, which is named after the high school which one of creator Michael Braverman's children attended at the time. The name itself is a blend of the real suburbs served by the school, Glenview and Northbrook.

Each episode's opening credits end with a shot of Arnold, the family dog (billed as "Arnold the Semi-Wonder Dog"). Apparently forgotten by the family in their rush to get ready for the day, he sits in the kitchen with his empty food bowl in his mouth and lets it drop to the floor. The show's producers received a constant trickle of letters each week from viewers who thought this was cruel, so in the final episode's opening credits, a bag of dog food spills out of a nearby cabinet.

=== Early seasons ===
During the show's first year, the main focus was on Corky. Much of the show examined the challenges of a family whose son had Down Syndrome. The Thatchers sought to have Corky interact with regular society after spending years socializing him amongst other kids with Down syndrome in "special" classes. The need to integrate Corky into normal society was Season 1's main storyline, as the Thatchers opted to enroll Corky in a regular high school despite the principal's demand that he be placed in an alternative program for those with Down syndrome.

In addition, during the first three seasons, episodes included Tyler Benchfield (Tommy Puett), Becca's high school crush, who also had a brother with Down syndrome.

Corky eventually got a job as an usher at a local movie theater. He later found a girlfriend, Amanda Swanson (Andrea Friedman), who also had Down Syndrome. They married by the series' end.

=== Later seasons ===
By the second season, the writers began to expand the show's scope beyond Corky, and the third and fourth seasons centered on Becca and a new character, Jesse (Chad Lowe), a junior who met Becca through the school's theatre department. As they become friends, Jesse told Becca he was HIV positive. Tyler became less prominent in Becca's life and was jealous of Becca's closeness with Jesse. His character was written out and he was given the memorable sendoff of dying in a car accident with Corky as passenger.

Much to the surprise of those around them, Becca and Jesse began a relationship despite his HIV. The writers explored life with HIV through Jesse's character, and the difficulties the disease causes with romantic relationships. The relationship between Corky and Becca, previously portrayed as close, was also explored, as Corky briefly turned his back on his sister for dumping a mutual friend to date Jesse.

The fourth season's first episode, in which a 40-something Becca (Pamela Bellwood) tours the house she grew up in while remembering the events of 25 years earlier, establishes that Jesse would ultimately die from AIDS and that Becca would move on and marry a man named David. The series itself ended ambiguously but on an upbeat note, showing Becca five years later, married with a son named Jesse. In the final episode Corky was set to graduate from high school, but he did not because the school board did not waive the math requirement.

== Episodes ==
=== Series overview ===
Season	Episodes	Originally released	
Season	Episodes	First released	Last released
1	22	September 12, 1989	May 13, 1990
2	22	September 16, 1990	May 5, 1991
3	22	September 22, 1991	May 10, 1992
4	17	September 20, 1992	May 23, 1993

=== Season 1 (1989–90) ===
No. overall	No. in season	Title	Directed by	Written by	Original release date	Viewers (millions)
1	1	"Pilot"	Rick Rosenthal	Michael Braverman	September 12, 1989	23.6
2	2	"Corky for President"	Kim Friedman	Paul Wolff	September 24, 1989	16.7
3	3	"The Baby-Sitter"	Rick Rosenthal	Jule Selbo	October 1, 1989	14.5
4	4	"Break a Leg, Mom"	Rick Rosenthal	Michael Braverman	October 8, 1989	16.8
5	5	"Becca's First Love"	Rick Rosenthal	Jule Selbo	October 15, 1989	15.7
6	6	"Paige's Date"	Jerry Jameson	Joe Shulkin	October 22, 1989	14.2
7	7	"Paige's Mom"	Gene Reynolds	Ronald Rubin	November 5, 1989	15.6
8	8	"Call of the Wild"	Georg Fenady	Linda Cowgill	November 12, 1989	12.9
9	9	"Corky Witnesses a Crime"	Kim Friedman	Tom O'Brien	November 26, 1989	16.9
10	10	"Ordinary Heroes"	Gene Reynolds	Paul Wolff	December 3, 1989	15.3
11	11	"Pets, Guys and Videotape"	Mel Damski	Star Frohman	December 10, 1989	14.7
12	12	"Corky's Crush"	Gene Reynolds	Jule Selbo	January 14, 1990	15.6
13	13	"Thatcher and Henderson"	Rick Rosenthal	Michael Nankin	January 21, 1990	16.1
14	14	"The Return of Uncle Richard"	Kim Friedman	Michael Braverman	February 4, 1990	14.6
15	15	"Brothers"	Jerry Jameson	Ronald Rubin	February 11, 1990	17.7
16	16	"Corky Rebels"	Gene Reynolds	Paul Wolff	February 18, 1990	16.3
17	17	"It Ain't All It's Cracked Up to Be"	Kim Friedman	Star Frohman	March 4, 1990	15.4
18	18	"Pig O' My Heart"	Michael Braverman	Michael Nankin	March 25, 1990	15.3
19	19	"Becca and the Underground Newspaper"	Rick Rosenthal	Jule Selbo	April 1, 1990	10.6
20	20	"Save the Last Dance for Me"	Larry Shaw	Judith Fein	April 15, 1990	9.8
21	21	"With a Mighty Heart"	Paul Wolff	Paul Wolff	April 29, 1990	12.2
22	22	"The Spring Fling"	Larry Shaw	Ronald Rubin	May 13, 1990	9.7

=== Season 2 (1990–91) ===
No. overall	No. in season	Title	Directed by	Written by	Original release date	Viewers (millions)
23	1	"Honeymoon from Hell"	Rick Rosenthal	Michael Braverman	September 16, 1990	13.3
24	2	"Corky and the Dolphins"	Rick Rosenthal	Jule Selbo	September 23, 1990	13.7
25	3	"The Visitor"	Michael Nankin	Michael Nankin	September 30, 1990	13.5
26	4	"Becca and the Band"	Kim Friedman	Susan Wald	October 7, 1990	15.1
27	5	"The Banquet Room Renovation"	E.W. Swackhamer	Wesley Bishop	October 14, 1990	13.1
28	6	"Halloween"	Kim Friedman	Liz Coe	October 28, 1990	19.4
29	7	"Chicken Pox"	Charles Braverman	David M. Wolf	November 4, 1990	16.2
30	8	"La Dolce Becca"	Miles Watkins	Star Frohman	November 11, 1990	16.6
31	9	"A Thatcher Thanksgiving"	Charles Braverman	Michael Nankin & Michael Braverman	November 18, 1990	15.2
32	10	"Libby's Sister"	Rick Rosenthal	Liz Coe	November 25, 1990	15.9
33	11	"The Buddy"	Roy Campanella II	Brad Markowitz	December 9, 1990	11.6
34	12	"The Bicycle Thief"	Mel Damski	David M. Wolf	December 16, 1990	11.9
35	13	"Isn't It Romantic?"	Michael Lange	Michael Nankin	January 6, 1991	15.8
36	14	"The Bigger Picture"	Jerry Jameson	Star Frohman	January 13, 1991	15.5
37	15	"Last Stand in Glen Brook"	Larry Shaw	Marti Noxon	February 3, 1991	13.6
38	16	"Head Over Heels"	Dick Rogers	Liz Coe	February 10, 1991	16.4
39	17	"Corky's Travels"	Rick Rosenthal	David M. Wolf	March 10, 1991	13.8
40	18	"Thanks a Bunch, Dr. Lamaze"	Michael Lange	Brad Markowitz	March 17, 1991	14.8
41	19	"Ghost of Grandpa Past"	Kim Friedman	Michael Braverman	March 31, 1991	11.0
42	20	"Arthur"	Michael Nankin	Michael Nankin	April 7, 1991	9.1
43	21	"Lighter Than Air"	Michael Braverman	Dick Lochte	April 28, 1991	11.7
44	22	"Proms and Prams"	Kim Friedman	Liz Coe	May 5, 1991	13.5

=== Season 3 (1991–92) ===
No. overall	No. in season	Title	Directed by	Written by	Original release date	Viewers (millions)
45	1	"Toast"	Michael Lange	Michael Nankin	September 22, 1991	13.9
46	2	"Hello, Goodbye"	Jerry Jameson	Bryce Zabel	September 29, 1991	14.5
47	3	"Out of the Mainstream"	Kim Friedman	Brad Markowitz	October 6, 1991	14.0
48	4	"Armageddon"	Michael Lange	Charles Pratt Jr.	October 13, 1991	14.4
49	5	"Sweet 16"	Michael Lange	Toni Graphia	October 20, 1991	14.5
50	6	"Life After Death"	Larry Shaw	Thania St. John	November 3, 1991	19.6
51	7	"Dueling Divas"	Kim Friedman	Charles Pratt Jr.	November 10, 1991	16.8
52	8	"Invasion of the Thatcher Snatchers"	Michael Nankin	Michael Nankin	November 17, 1991	14.3
53	9	"Loaded Question"	David Carson	Brad Markowitz	November 24, 1991	15.6
54	10	"Triangles"	Kim Friedman	Toni Graphia	December 1, 1991	16.8
55	11	"The Smell of Fear"	Michael Lange	Thania St. John	December 15, 1991	17.6
56	12	"Struck by Lighting"	Larry Shaw	Charles Pratt Jr.	January 5, 1992	16.4
57	13	"Jerry's Deli"	Larry Shaw	E.F. Wallengren	January 19, 1992	13.8
58	14	"The Room"	Michael Lange	Story by : Michael Nankin & Toni Graphia; Teleplay by : Michael Nankin, Toni Graphia, Thania St. John & Charles Pratt Jr.	February 9, 1992	12.6
59	15	"The Wall"	Michael Lange	Brad Markowitz	February 16, 1992	14.1
60	16	"The Blues"	Michael Nankin	Toni Graphia	February 23, 1992	14.1
61	17	"The Fairy Tale"	Michael Lange	Thania St. John	March 1, 1992	12.7
62	18	"Hearts and Flowers"	Larry Shaw	Charles Pratt Jr.	March 15, 1992	13.3
63	19	"Corky's Romance"	Kim Friedman	E.F. Wallengren	March 29, 1992	13.1
64	20	"More Than Friends"	Bill Smitrovich	Brad Markowitz	April 26, 1992	14.2
65	21	"Confessions"	Michael Lange	Toni Graphia	May 3, 1992	14.4
66	22	"Consenting Adults"	Michael Nankin	Charles Pratt Jr.	May 10, 1992	10.7

=== Season 4 (1992–93) ===
No. overall	No. in season	Title	Directed by	Written by	Original release date	Viewers (millions)
67	1	"Bec to the Future"	Michael Nankin	Thania St. John & Toni Graphia	September 20, 1992	13.4
68	2	"Exposed"	Michael Lange	E F. Wallengren	September 27, 1992	13.6
69	3	"Premarital Syndrome"	Michael Braverman	Toni Graphia & Thania St. John	October 4, 1992	12.6
70	4	"The Whole Truth"	Michael Lange	Scott Frost	October 18, 1992	14.1
71	5	"Love Letters"	Georg Fenady	Marshall Goldberg	November 8, 1992	11.7
72	6	"Windows"	Michael Nankin	Toni Graphia	November 22, 1992	14.5
73	7	"Babes in the Woods"	Sandy Smolan	Thania St. John	November 29, 1992	11.9
74	8	"Udder Madness"	Kim Friedman	E.F. Wallengren	December 13, 1992	11.2
75	9	"Happy Holidays"	Randall William Cook	Marshall Goldberg	December 20, 1992	12.3
76	10	"Choices"	Michael Lange	Toni Graphia	January 3, 1993	14.8
77	11	"Incident on Main"	R.W. Goodwin	Scott Frost	January 10, 1993	16.0
78	12	"Lost Weekend"	Lorenzo Destefano	Thania St. John	January 24, 1993	14.6
79	13	"Visions"	Michael Lange	E.F. Wallengren	February 14, 1993	14.3
80	14	"Five to Midnight"	Michael Nankin	Scott Frost	February 21, 1993	15.8
81	15	"Bedfellows"	Michael Lange	Marshall Goldberg	February 28, 1993	14.4
82	16	"Last Wish"	Joe Pennella	Toni Graphia	March 7, 1993	15.3
83	17	"Life Goes On (and On and On)"	Michael Lange	E.F. Wallengren	May 23, 1993	13.2

== Broadcast history and U.S. television ratings ==
Season	Timeslot (ET)	Season Premiere	Season Finale	TV Season	Nielsen Ranking
1	Sunday 7:00 pm	September 21, 1989	May 13, 1990	1989–1990	#75 (8.7 rating)
2	Sunday 7:00 pm	September 16, 1990	May 5, 1991	1990–1991	#68 (8.92 rating)
3	Sunday 7:00 pm	September 22, 1991	May 10, 1992	1991–1992	#68 (9.21 rating)
4	Sunday 7:00 pm	September 20, 1992	May 23, 1993	1992–1993	#66 (9.11 rating)

In Canada, the show aired on Crossroads Television System. In New Zealand, the show aired Saturday afternoons on TVNZ's Channel 2.

In the United States, reruns have previously aired on The Family Channel, FX and PAX TV.

The series aired in Argentina on the Telefe network in 1993. Corky, the name of the main character, quickly became a local insult for people with mental problems, which caused a situation involving Carlos Mac Allister (of Boca Junior) being repeatedly called "Corky" for his physiology, as well as an apology from a local commentator in order to stop calling him by that nickname.

== Awards and nominations ==
Year	Award	Category	Recipient	Result
1993	American Television Awards	Best Supporting Actress, Dramatic Series	Kellie Martin	Won
1990	Golden Globe Award	Best Supporting Actor – Series, Miniseries or Television Film	Chris Burke	Nominated
1993	Humanitas Prize	60 Minute Category	Marshall Goldberg (For episode "Bedfellows")	Nominated
1990	Primetime Emmy Award	Outstanding Guest Actress in a Drama Series	Viveca Lindfors (For episode "Save the Last Dance for Me")	Won
1991	Primetime Emmy Award	Outstanding Original Music and Lyrics	Mark Mueller and Craig Safan (For song "Bittersweet Waltz") (For episode "Corky's Travels")	Nominated
1993	Primetime Emmy Award	Outstanding Supporting Actor in a Drama Series	Chad Lowe	Won
1993	Primetime Emmy Award	Outstanding Supporting Actress in a Drama Series	Kellie Martin	Nominated
1990	Viewers for Quality Television Award	Best Actress in a Quality Drama Series	Patti LuPone	Nominated
1991	Viewers for Quality Television Award	Best Actress in a Quality Drama Series	Patti LuPone	Nominated
1992	Viewers for Quality Television Award	Best Supporting Actress in a Quality Drama Series	Kellie Martin	Won
1992	Viewers for Quality Television Award	Founder's Award		Won
1993	Viewers for Quality Television Award	Best Quality Drama Series		Nominated
1993	Viewers for Quality Television Award	Best Supporting Actor in a Quality Drama Series	Chad Lowe	Won
1993	Viewers for Quality Television Award	Best Supporting Actress in a Quality Drama Series	Kellie Martin	Nominated
1994	Writers Guild of America Award	Episodic Drama	Toni Graphia (For episode "Last Wish")	Nominated
1990	Young Artist Award	Best Young Actor Supporting Role in a Television Series	Tommy Puett	Nominated
1990	Young Artist Award	Best Young Actor Supporting Role in a Television Series	Kevin Telles	Nominated
1990	Young Artist Award	Best Young Actress Supporting Role in a Television Series	Kellie Martin	Nominated
1990	Young Artist Award	Best Young Actor Guest Starring in a Television Series	Michael Bays	Nominated
1990	Young Artist Award	Best Young Actor Guest Starring in a Television Series	Ryan Bollman	Nominated
1990	Young Artist Award	Best New Television Series		Nominated
1990	Young Artist Award	Inspiration to Youth	Chris Burke	Won
1991	Young Artist Award	Best Young Actor Starring in a Television Series	Chris Burke	Nominated
1991	Young Artist Award	Best Young Actress Starring in a Television Series	Kellie Martin	Won
1991	Young Artist Award	Best Young Actress Supporting or Recurring Role For a TV Series	Tanya Fenmore	Nominated
1991	Young Artist Award	Best Young Actress Supporting or Recurring Role For a TV Series	Leigh Ann Orsi	Nominated
1992	Young Artist Award	Best Young Actress Starring in a Television Series	Kellie Martin	Won
1993	Young Artist Award	Best Young Actress Starring in a Television Series	Kellie Martin	Nominated
1993	Young Artist Award	Best Young Actress Recurring in a Television Series	Kiersten Warren	Nominated

== Home media ==
On May 9, 2006, Warner Home Video released Season 1 of Life Goes On on DVD in Region 1. It is unknown if the remaining three seasons will be released. The DVD release has a replacement theme song at the beginning of each episode, with the exception of the show's pilot. The replacement was due to high licensing costs for the Beatles' song "Ob-La-Di, Ob-La-Da." The new song, aptly titled "Life Goes On," was written by composer Marc Jackson of MoonLab Music and sung by singer-songwriter Tara Johnston. The song was written specifically for the DVD release.

== Possible continuation ==
In September 2021, it was reported that a possible follow-up series with original cast member Kellie Martin, and with Martin, Chad Lowe and Nkechi Okoro Carroll producing, is in the works. In January 2022, it was announced that NBC had given a pilot commitment for a new series with Martin set to return as star. Carroll will write and executive produce under her production company Rocky My Soul Productions banner; Lindsay Dunn will also executive produce, while Martin and Lowe will produce.
