= Queen of Mean (song) =

2019 song by Sarah Jeffery

- Remix cover

Single by Sarah Jeffery

from the album Descendants 3
- Released: August 2, 2019
- Genre: Trap-pop
- Length: 3:09
- Label: Walt Disney
- Songwriters: Adam Schmalhoz, Thomas Sturges, Tim James & Antonina Armato

Sarah Jeffery singles chronology
"Queen of Mean" (2019)	"Even the Stars" (2020)

Descendants singles chronology
"VK Mashup" (2019)	"Queen of Mean" (2019)	"What's My Name (Red Version)" (2024)

"Queen of Mean" is a song by Sarah Jeffery in her role of Princess Audrey from the Descendants 3 film and its soundtrack. The song was released on August 2, 2019, along with the album. The song has reached No. 49 on the Billboard Hot 100 chart. The song has also peaked at No. 57 on the Canadian Hot 100, and No. 89 on the UK Singles Chart. The official Death Grips remix was released on October 13, 2019, exclusively to SoundCloud.

== Commercial performance ==
The song debuted at number 67 on the Billboard Hot 100 chart becoming Jeffery's first entry on the chart and one of the highest-charting songs from the Descendants franchise as well as the highest charting solo song from any of the films. In its second week, the song jumped to number forty nine on the chart becoming the second highest-charting song from any Descendants film behind “Rotten To The Core”. The song spent eight consecutive weeks on the Billboard Hot 100 becoming the longest charting Descendants song.

== Music video ==
The music video was released on Disney Music's Vevo channel on August 2, 2019 following the premiere of the film. Overnight, the music video achieved two million views, and later reached number one on YouTube's Trending videos list.

On September 27, 2019, Disney released a Memoji music video for the song.

== Charts ==
Chart (2019)	Peak position
Canada Hot 100 (Billboard)	57
Ireland (IRMA)	83
Scottish Singles Sales (Official Charts)	65
UK Singles (Official Charts)	89
US Billboard Hot 100	49
US Kid Digital Songs (Billboard)	1
US Pop Digital Songs (Billboard)	11

== Certifications ==
Region	Certification	Certified units/sales
Brazil (Pro-Música Brasil)	Platinum	40,000^{‡}
United Kingdom (BPI)	Silver	200,000^{‡}
United States (RIAA)	2× Platinum	2,000,000^{‡}
^{‡} Sales+streaming figures based on certification alone.

== Track listing ==
- Digital download
1. "Queen of Mean" - 3:09
- Remixes EP
1. "Queen of Mean (CLOUDxCITY Remix) - 3:30
2. "Queen of Mean/What's My Name CLOUDxCITY Mashup - 2:28
