= The Starter Wife (TV series) =

- Created by: Josann McGibbon and Sara Parriott
- Based on: The Starter Wife by Gigi Levangie
- Starring: Debra Messing; Judy Davis; Chris Diamantopoulos; David Alan Basche; Danielle Nicolet; Brielle Barbusca; Hart Bochner
- Composer: Edward Shearmur
- Country of origin: United States
- Original language: English
- No. of seasons: 1
- No. of episodes: 10

Production
- Producers: Gigi Levangie Grazer; Debra Messing; Josann McGibbon; Sara Parriott
- Running time: 60 minutes
- Production companies: 3 Arts Entertainment; McGibbon-Parriott Productions; Universal Cable Productions

Original release
- Network: USA Network
- Release: October 10 – December 12, 2008

The Starter Wife is a USA Network romantic comedy television series based on the miniseries of the same name, and the novel of the same name by Gigi Levangie. It premiered on October 10, 2008 and ended on December 12, 2008, lasting one season. The series starred Debra Messing as Molly Kagan, the ex-wife of a former studio executive named Kenny Kagan (David Alan Basche).

Picking up where the mini-series left off, Molly finds herself trying to carve out a new life as a single mother raising her daughter Jaden in the middle of the dysfunctional world surrounding the film industry. Molly has vowed to swear off men after the failure of her "happy ending" relationship with a homeless man, and soon finds herself developing as a writer even as her relationship develops with her writing group leader.

The series ran one season and was cancelled by USA in February 2009. In regard to the show's cancellation, Debra Messing, during a conference in 2012, told reporters: "We were finishing the first season right when the economy collapsed." She added, "We were the most expensive show the network had ever had...I heard rumors about we doing half the original budget ($1 million per episode), but that couldn't work because it was about the brand, and that luxurious world. And when you take that away from it, it stops being the show what it is. The dark humor, and comedy won't land."

== Cast ==
=== Main characters ===
- Molly Kagan (Debra Messing) Now divorced, without the cushy settlement she'd anticipated, and with her children's book selling poorly, Molly struggles to find her voice as a writer–and a source of income. When she enrolls in a writing class, she meets a new man, and discovers she has a knack for observational writing. But before she can cash in, the source of her writing, her journal, is stolen, and its contents splashed across the Web. At the same time, Molly finds herself both drawn to and frustrated by her ex-husband as he struggles to re-establish his career after being fired as a studio executive.
- Joan McAllister (Judy Davis) Molly's closest friend. A recovering alcoholic, Joan finds herself working as a patient driver at a tiny rehab clinic at Pappy's suggestion when she begins to struggle to remain sober. She is treated with mistrust by one of the staff, but soon finds her own approach to dealing with her problematic passengers.
- Rodney Evans (Chris Diamantopoulos) Molly and Joan's gay friend. A designer, Rodney is constantly looking for love, but enjoys the chase more than a relationship until he meets closeted action hero Felix Jones. When the two fall in love, the road to romance is anything but smooth when Felix's career depends on his staying in the closet.
- Kenny Kagan (David Alan Basche) Molly's ex-husband, once a major player in Hollywood, but now desperately trying to market a movie bound to be a flop. Kenny tries to be a good father to Jaden, but equates the role with the money he spends on toys for his daughter, not the time he spends with her. (Played by Peter Jacobson in the original miniseries)
- Liz Marsh (Danielle Nicolet) The wife of a major league baseball player, she becomes Molly's friend. Liz has troubles of her own when her jealousy threatens her marriage to a major-league baseball star.
- Jaden Kagan (Brielle Barbusca). Molly and Kenny's seven-year-old daughter who wants what every kid wants: the toy of the moment and her parents back together.
- Zach McNeal (Hart Bochner) An attractive, divorced single father who teaches Molly's writing class. Zach's ex-wife is a casting director, so he knows the score where the Hollywood lifestyle is concerned.

=== Recurring characters ===
- Lou Manahan (Joe Mantegna) Molly's friend and Kenny's former boss. He once tried to kindle a romance with Molly, and now finds himself engaged to a woman who may not be all she seems to be.
- Felix Jones (James Black) The African-American action hero who hires Rodney to decorate his house and becomes his secret lover.
- Devon Marsh (Reggie Austin) Liz' husband, a major league baseball player. Although loving and supportive of Liz, he has a secret that fuels her jealousy, nearly ending their marriage.
- David Shea (Daniel Gerroll) A past-his-prime alcoholic British Shakespearean actor Joan must shepherd through detox, who eventually becomes Joan's lover.
- Pappy McAllister (Ronny Cox) Joan's patient, loving husband, who suggests Joan work at the clinic, and later, gives Joan permission to have an affair, with a less than enthusiastic reception. When the two embark on a six-month cruise, Joan disappears from the boat and Pappy dies under mysterious circumstances.
- Bo (Vincent Ward) An employee of Felix Jones who knows Felix's secret, but keeps quiet about it.

== Hollywood metaphors ==
The series uses extensive Hollywood metaphors as part of its narrative structure. Each episode includes two or more fantasy sequences, featuring Molly as the lead character in a well-known, generally big box-office film. Every episode opens with the first of these, which takes place in the form of Molly's dreams about recent events in her life. Typical of this is the fantasy from the opening episode, a play on the end of the film Elizabeth. In the fantasy Molly swears off men in the manner of Elizabeth I declaring herself married to England at the film's end. Other fantasy sequences punctuate important story points. Similarly, episode titles are corruptions of film titles (as with "The French Disconnection" and "Look Who's Stalking") or suggestive of Hollywood phenomena (such as "Mollywood", a play on "Hollywood".)

== Episodes ==
No.	Title	Fantasy sequence(s)	Original release date
1	"The Forty Year Old Virgin Queen"	Elizabeth (opening)	October 10, 2008
2	"The Diary of a Mad Ex-Housewife"	Mission Impossible (opening)	October 10, 2008
3	"The Remains of the Snow Day"	Blair Witch Project (opening)	October 17, 2008
4	"Mollywood"	Castaway (opening); The Deer Hunter	October 24, 2008
5	"Das Booty Call"	Body Heat (opening)	October 31, 2008
6	"The Ex-Files"	Hello, Dolly! (opening)	November 7, 2008
7	"The French Disconnection"	Scream (opening)	November 14, 2008
8	"Look Who's Stalking"	The Godfather (opening), Dirty Harry	November 21, 2008
9	"Her Old Man & the Sea"	Lara Croft: Tomb Raider (opening), A Few Good Men	December 5, 2008
10	"A Woman Over the Influence"	The Green Mile (opening), Basic Instinct	December 12, 2008

== Home media ==
On March 10, 2009, Universal Studios Home Entertainment released the full series on DVD in Region 1. The DVD includes audio commentary on two episodes and a segment on the creation of the fantasy sequences.

== International broadcast ==
The Starter Wife was shown on Irish TV Channel 3e It was shown for a time on TV3 in New Zealand on Saturdays at 3:00pm.
