= Sara Parriott =

American screenwriter

- Occupation: Screenwriter

Sara Parriott is an American screenwriter working in partnership with Josann McGibbon. The team's first major success was a screenwriter credit for the early Brad Pitt film, The Favor. Their major works since then include Three Men and a Little Lady, Runaway Bride and the Descendants franchise. Parriott was nominated for two primetime Emmys in 2007, and won a Writers Guild of America Award in 2016 for Disney's 2015 television film Descendants.

McGibbon & Parriott have been featured in interviews in IndieWire and FSM Media, among others.
