= Gigi Levangie =

American novelist

- Born: Georgianne Levangie; January 2, 1963 (age 63); Los Angeles, California, U.S.
- Education: University of California, Los Angeles
- Occupations: Novelist; screenwriter; TV producer
- Spouses: Brian Grazer (m. 1997; div. 2007): Chris Elise
- Children: 2

Georgianne "Gigi" Levangie; January 2, 1963) is an American novelist, screenwriter, and television producer. She has written numerous screenplays but is most widely known for the film Stepmom, starring Julia Roberts and Susan Sarandon. Levangie Grazer is also the author of a number of New York Times best-selling novels including The Starter Wife, Maneater, Queen Takes King, and The After Wife.

== Biography ==
Levangie was born and raised in Los Angeles, California, where she lived most of her life on the Eastside of Hollywood. She played violin in a junior orchestra and was also voted Class Clown at LeConte Junior High. She was a student at Hollywood High when she gave up violin to become a cheerleader. She attended UCLA, where she majored in political science. Gigi reportedly never joined a sorority at UCLA because she couldn't afford it as well as not being able to stand authority, especially from "smug rich kids." Her Hollywood career began as an intern on a late-night talk show, for which she wrote sketches; she later became an assistant to producer Fred Silverman, who dissuaded her from attending law school by offering her a substantial raise and writing assignments for the television series In the Heat of the Night.

== Career ==
=== Author ===
Levangie is the New York Times best selling author of seven novels: Rescue Me (2000), Maneater (2003), which was turned into a Lifetime miniseries, and The Starter Wife (2006), which was adapted for a 2007 miniseries on the USA Network. Its success led to a regular series. Her fourth novel, Queen Takes King, was released in 2009, and was developed by Lifetime for a television movie. Her fifth novel, The After Wife, was released in July 2012, by Random House. Seven Deadlies was released in 2013. 2020 saw the release of her seventh novel, Been There, Married That. She has written numerous magazine articles, featured in Vogue, Harper's Bazaar and Glamour.

=== Screenwriter ===
Her screenwriting debut film Stepmom was a hit at the box office grossing over $91,137,662 in the United States. Stepmom grossed $159,710,793 worldwide from a budget of $50 million. Stepmom opened #2 in weekend gross on Dec 25–27 in 1998 at $19,142,440.

Levangie’s screenplay for the Susan Sarandon-Julia Roberts film was claimed to be based on her experience dealing with husband Brian Grazer's children, Riley and Sage from his first marriage. However, the story of the film is virtually identical to the earlier 1995 TV movie The Other Woman written by Nancey Silvers, who later sued the studio which made Stepmom for copyright infringement. Silvers's lawsuit was dismissed because Silvers does not own the copyright for her script.

=== Television ===
Levangie was a host and judge for the Logo original series The Arrangement, a floral arranging competition reality television series.

She has also appeared as a guest judge in Seasons 2 and 3 of RuPaul's Drag Race on Logo.

==== The Starter Wife (miniseries) ====
The Starter Wife is a 2007 USA Network television miniseries based on the 2006 novel by Levangie. The plot focuses on Molly Kagan (Debra Messing) who after years of marriage to a Hollywood film mogul is forced to redefine herself and her role in society when her husband leaves her for a younger woman. The miniseries premiered with a two-hour presentation on May 31, 2007. The premiere of The Starter Wife miniseries delivered strong ratings attracting 5.4 million viewers and marked USA’s biggest original premiere among adults 18-49. It was nominated for 10 Emmy Awards, including Outstanding Miniseries, Lead Actress in a Miniseries or a Movie Debra Messing, Supporting Actor in a Miniseries or a Movie Judy Davis, and Writing for a Miniseries or Movie. Judy Davis won an Emmy for her portrayal as Joan McAllister.

==== Maneater (miniseries) ====
Part two of Lifetime (TV Network) movie Maneater was the network’s highest-rated television program of the year among adult women. Maneater, starring Sarah Chalke and based on Levangie’s New York Times bestseller, was seen by 2.9 million viewers and averaged a 2.1 among women 18 to 49. Maneater's finale would go on to double its ratings from the previous night.

== Personal life ==
In her 20s, she was married to an "alluring Indian, Italian, African-American blues musician". They separated after three years and later divorced.

Soon after she would meet her future husband, Brian Grazer by accident at Orlando-Orsini on Pico Blvd at a lunch with a Playboy executive. They married on September 20, 1997. They have two sons together, Thomas (b. November 15, 1999) and Patrick (b. September 27, 2003). Two weeks after her novel The Starter Wife was published on April 4, 2006, Brian filed for legal separation. The two later reconciled; however they have since divorced but remain good friends and are happily raising their children together.

Levangie then married photographer Chris Elise, who she met on Tinder. On May 14, 2023, Chris Elise died.

== Writing credits ==
Film

- Stepmom (1998) (Also executive producer)
- Trust (2025)

Television

Year	Title	Notes	Ref.
1993	Love in the Night of Heat	Part 1 & 2	
2007	The Starter Wife	"Show Me on Montana": #2.10	
2009	Maneater	Miniseries	
